= Pomona College =

Liberal arts college in Claremont, California, US

- Type: Private liberal arts college
- Established: October 14, 1887
- Academic affiliations: Claremont Colleges
- Endowment: $2.99 billion (2024)
- President: G. Gabrielle Starr
- Total staff: 912
- Undergraduates: 1,685
- Postgraduates: 2,038 (Claremont Graduate University)
- Location: Claremont, California, United States; 34°05′53″N 117°42′50″W
- Campus: 140 acres (57 ha); Suburban
- Colors: Blue and white (Note: The college also frequently uses gold as an accent color, and its athletics teams use blue and orange to represent both Pomona and Pitzer, its athletics partner.)
- Nickname: Sagehens
- Sporting affiliations: NCAA Division III – SCIAC
- Mascot: Cecil the Sagehen
- Website: www.pomona.edu

Pomona College (/pəˈmoʊnə/ pə-MOH-nə) is a private college in Claremont, California, United States. It was established in 1887 by a group of Congregationalists who wanted to recreate a "college of the New England type" in Southern California. In 1925, it became the founding member of the Claremont Colleges consortium of adjacent, affiliated institutions.

Pomona is a four-year undergraduate institution that enrolls approximately 1,700 students. It offers 48 majors in liberal arts disciplines and roughly 650 courses, as well as access to more than 2,000 additional courses at the other Claremont Colleges. Its 140-acre (57 ha) campus is in a residential community 35 miles (56 km) east of downtown Los Angeles, near the foothills of the San Gabriel Mountains.

Pomona has a $3.25 billion endowment, as of June 2025 making it one of the ten wealthiest schools in the U.S. on a per-student basis. Nearly all students live on campus, and the student body is noted for its racial, geographic, and socioeconomic diversity. The college's athletics teams, the Sagehens, compete jointly with Pitzer College in the SCIAC, a Division III conference. The college is considered one of the top liberal arts colleges in the country.

Prominent alumni of Pomona include Oscar, Emmy, Grammy, and Tony award winners; U.S. senators, ambassadors, and other federal officials; Pulitzer Prize recipients; billionaire executives; a Nobel Prize laureate; National Academies members; and Olympic athletes. The college is a top producer of Fulbright Scholars and recipients of other fellowships.

In October 2026, Pomona announced a strategic partnership with the Claremont Graduate University where it would become its parent institution and sole corporate member, after its alleged acquisition of CGU.

== History ==
=== Founding era ===
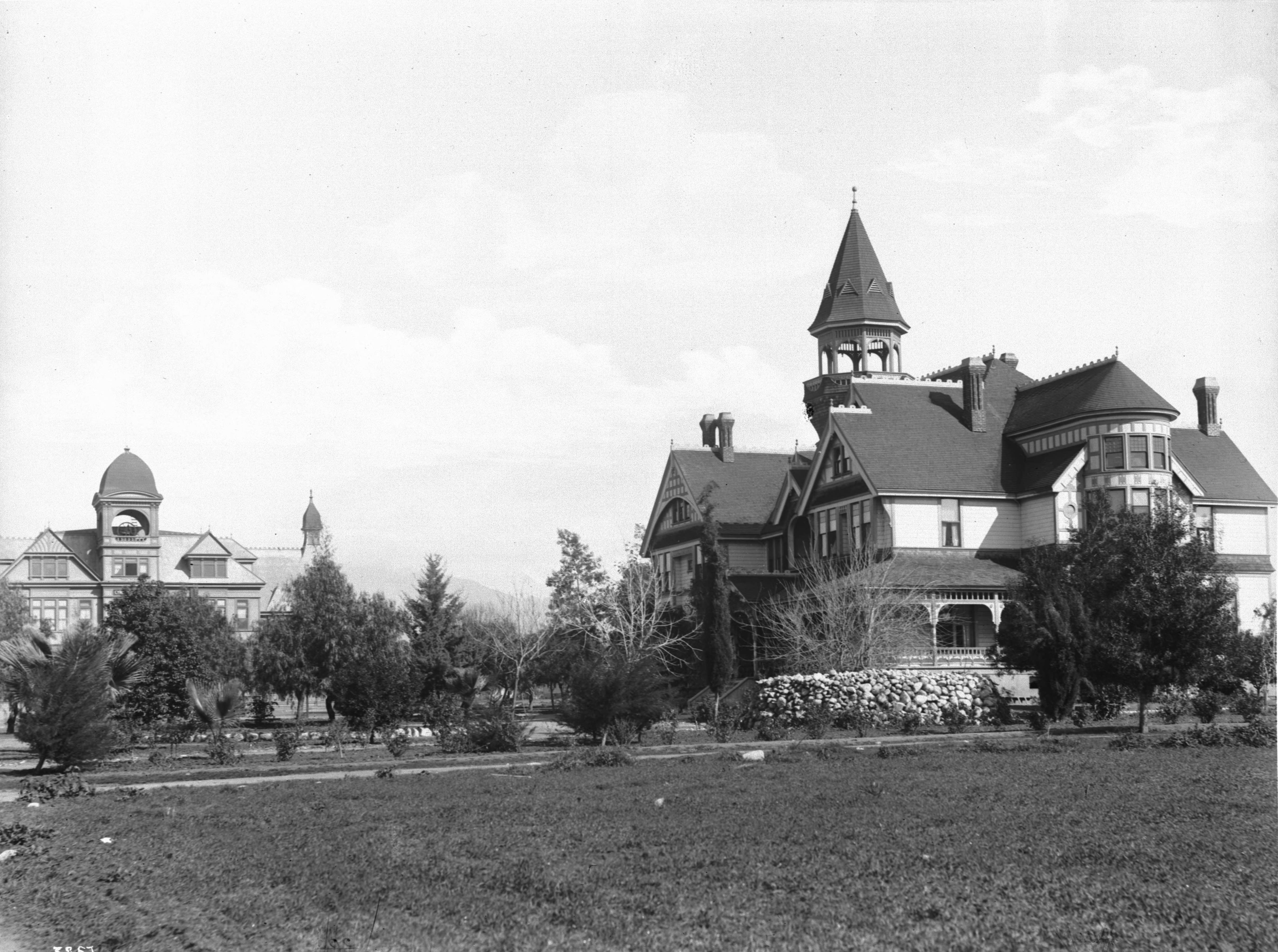
An exterior view of the college in 1907, featuring its two earliest buildings: Sumner Hall (right) and Holmes Hall (left)

Pomona College was established as a coeducational and nonsectarian Christian institution on October 14, 1887, amidst a real estate boom and anticipated population influx precipitated by the arrival of a transcontinental railroad to Southern California. Its founders, a regional group of Congregationalists, sought to create a "college of the New England type", emulating the institutions where many of them had been educated. Classes first began at Ayer Cottage, a rental house in Pomona, California, on September 12, 1888, with a permanent campus planned at Piedmont Mesa four miles north of the city. That year, as the real estate bubble burst, making the Piedmont campus financially untenable, the college was offered the site of an unfinished hotel (later renamed Sumner Hall) in the nearby, recently founded town of Claremont. It moved there but kept its name. (Note: The city of Pomona, in turn, was named after the goddess of fruitful abundance in Roman mythology, alluding to the region's citrus industry.) Trustee Charles B. Sumner led the college during its first years, helping hire its first official president, Cyrus G. Baldwin, in 1890. The first graduating class, in 1894, had 11 members.

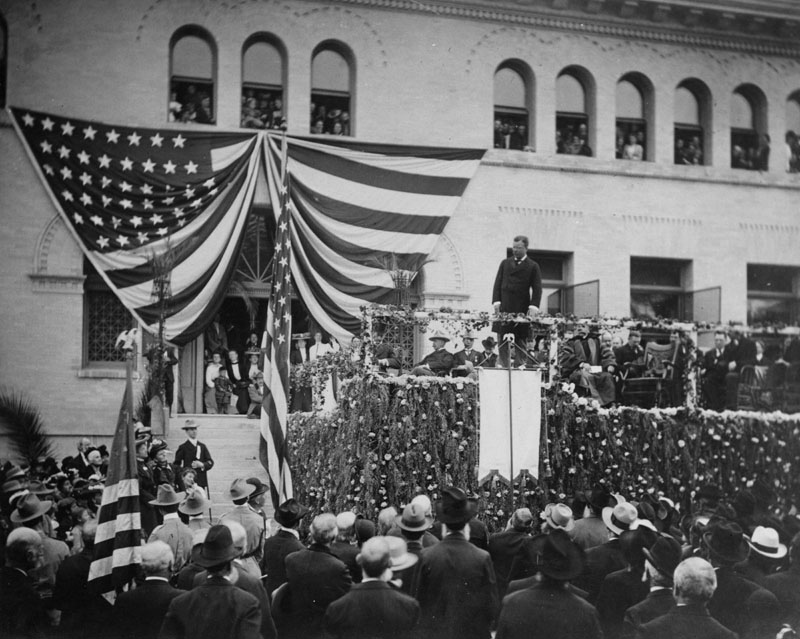
U.S. president Theodore Roosevelt speaking at Pomona in 1903

Pomona suffered through a severe financial crisis during its early years, but raised enough money to add several buildings to its campus. Although the first Asian and black students enrolled in 1897 and 1900, respectively, the student body (like most others of the era) remained almost all white throughout this period. In 1905, during President George A. Gates' tenure, the college acquired a 64-acre (26 ha) parcel of land to its east known as the Wash. In 1911, as high schools became more common in the region, the college eliminated its preparatory department, which had taught pre-college level courses. The following year, it committed to a liberal arts model, soon after turning its previously separate schools of art and music into departments within the college. In 1914, the Phi Beta Kappa honor society established a chapter at the college. Daily attendance at chapel was mandated until 1921, and student culture emphasized athletics and academic class rivalries. During World War I, male students were divided into three military companies and a Red Cross unit to assist in the war effort.

=== Mid-20th century ===
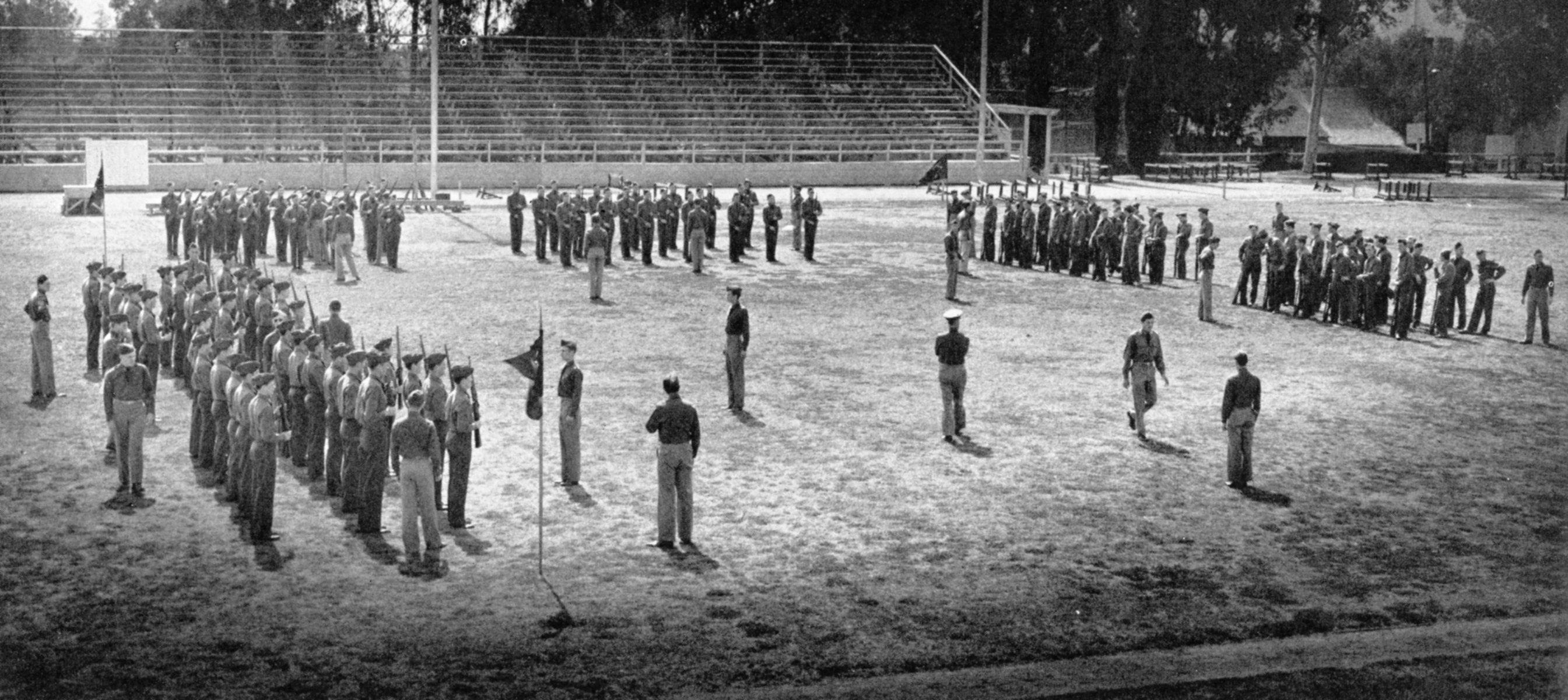
Reserve Officers' Training Corps soldiers at Pomona in 1942

Confronted with growing demand in the 1920s, Pomona's fourth president, James A. Blaisdell, considered whether to grow the college into a large university that could acquire additional resources or remain a small institution capable of providing a more intimate educational experience. Seeking both, he pursued an alternative path inspired by the collegiate university model he observed at Oxford, envisioning a group of independent colleges sharing centralized resources such as a library. On October 14, 1925, Pomona's 38th anniversary, the college founded the Claremont Colleges consortium. Construction of the Clark dormitories on North Campus (then the men's campus) began in 1929, a reflection of president Charles Edmunds' prioritization of the college's residential life. Edmunds, who had previously served as president of Lingnan University in Guangzhou, China, inspired a growing interest in Asian culture at the college and established its Asian studies program.

Pomona's enrollment declined during the Great Depression as students became unable to afford tuition, and its budget was slashed by a quarter. The college reoriented itself toward wartime activities again during World War II, hosting an Air Force military meteorology program and Army Specialized Training Program courses in engineering and foreign languages.

=== Postwar transformations ===
Pomona's longest-serving president, E. Wilson Lyon, guided the college through a transformational and turbulent period from 1941 to 1969. The college's enrollment rose above 1,000 following the war, leading to the construction of several residence halls and science facilities. Its endowment grew steadily, due in part to the introduction in 1942 of a deferred giving fundraising scheme pioneered by Allen Hawley called the Pomona Plan, where participants receive a lifetime annuity in exchange for donating to the college upon their death. The plan's model has since been adopted by many other colleges.

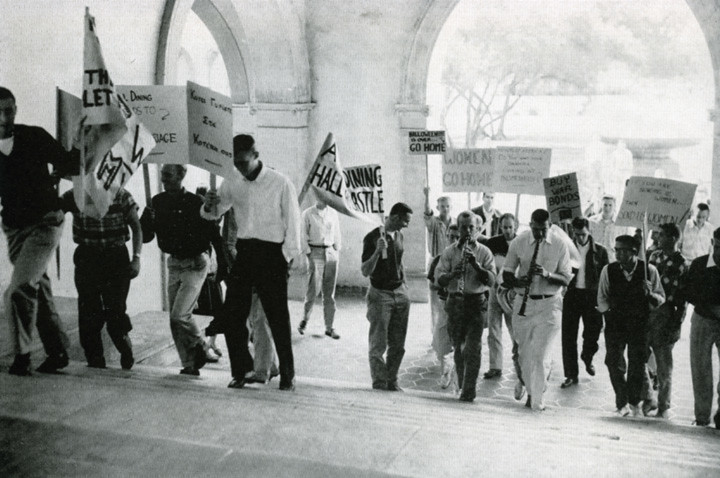
Men protesting the opening of Frary Dining Hall to women in 1957

Lyon made several progressive decisions relating to civil rights, including supporting Japanese-American students during internment and establishing an exchange program in 1952 with Fisk University, a historically black university in Tennessee. He and dean of women Jean Walton ended the gender segregation of Pomona's residential life, first with the opening of Frary Dining Hall (then part of the men's campus) to women beginning in 1957, and later with the elimination of parietal rules in the late 1960s and the introduction of co-educational housing in 1968. The student body, influenced by the countercultural revolution, became less socially conservative and more politically engaged in this era. Protesters opposed to the Vietnam War occupied Sumner Hall to obstruct Air Force recruiters in 1968 and forced the cancellation of classes at the end of the spring 1970 semester. The college's ethnic diversity also began to increase, and activists successfully pushed the consortium to establish black and Latino studies programs in 1969. A bomb exploded at the Carnegie Building that February, permanently injuring a secretary; no culprit was ever identified.

During the tenure of president David Alexander from 1969 to 1991, Pomona gained increased prominence on the national stage. The endowment increased ten-fold, enabling the construction and renovation of a number of buildings. Several identity-based groups, such as the Pomona College Women's Union (founded in 1984), were established. In the mid-1980s, out-of-state students began to outnumber in-state students.

In 1991, the college converted the dormitory basements used by fraternities into lounges, arguing that this created a more equitable distribution of campus space. The move lowered the profile of Greek life on campus.

=== 21st century ===
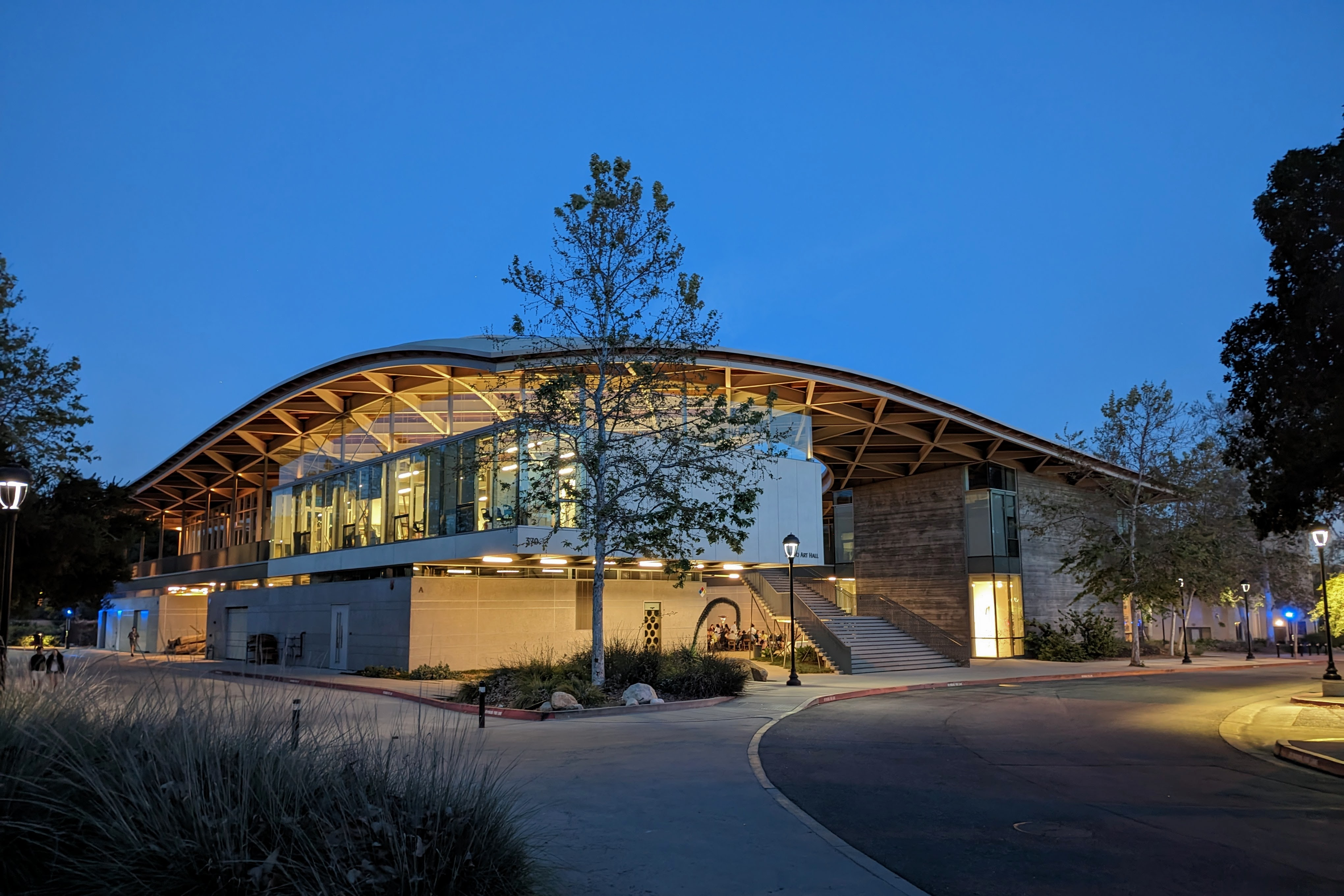
Pomona's Studio Art Hall, completed in 2014, garnered national recognition for its steel-frame design.

In the 2000s, under president David W. Oxtoby, Pomona began placing more emphasis on reducing its environmental impact, committing in 2003 to obtaining LEED certifications for new buildings and launching various sustainability initiatives. The college also entered partnerships with several college access groups (including the Posse Foundation in 2004 and QuestBridge in 2005) and committed to meeting the full demonstrated financial need of students through grants rather than loans in 2008. These efforts, combined with Pomona's previously instituted need-blind admission policy, resulted in increased enrollment of low-income and racial minority students.

In 2008, it was discovered that Pomona's alma mater may have been originally written to be sung as the ensemble finale to a student-produced blackface minstrel show performed on campus in 1910. The college stopped singing it at convocation and commencement, alienating some alumni.

Pomona requested proof of legal residency from employees amid a unionization drive by dining hall workers in 2011. Seventeen workers who were unable to provide documentation were fired, drawing national media attention and sparking criticism from activists; the dining hall staff voted to unionize in 2013. A rebranding initiative that year sought to emphasize students' passion and drive, angering students who thought it would lead to a more stressful culture. Several protests in the 2010s criticized the college's handling of sexual assault, leading to various reforms.

In 2017, G. Gabrielle Starr became Pomona's tenth president; she is the first woman and first African American to hold the office. From March 2020 through the spring 2021 semester, the college switched to online instruction in response to the COVID-19 pandemic. In April 2024, the college had 19 demonstrators occupying Starr's office to urge the college to divest from Israel arrested. This prompted condemnations and protests, including an encampment on Marston Quad that forced the college to move its commencement off-campus.

== Campus ==
Map of Pomona College's campus Academic instruction Administration and services Arts venues Housing and dining Open spaces Sports and recreation Pomona College boundary Claremont Colleges boundary Other Claremont Colleges

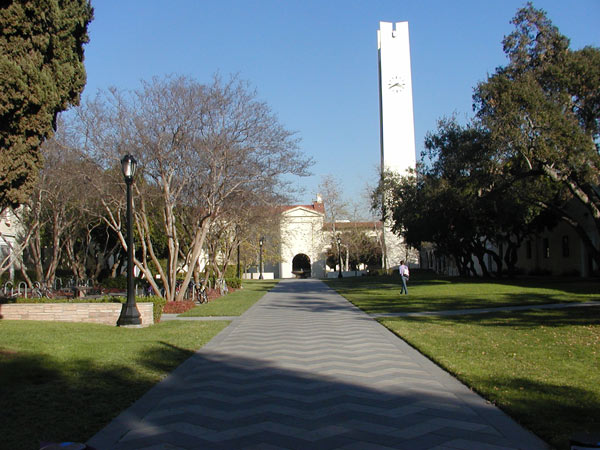
Pomona's buildings are connected via a network of visual axes, such as this one on North Campus.

Pomona's 140-acre (57 ha) campus is in Claremont, California, an affluent suburban residential community 35 miles (56 km) east of downtown Los Angeles. It is directly northwest of the Claremont Village (the city's downtown commercial district) and directly south of the other contiguous Claremont Colleges. The area has a Mediterranean climate and consists of a gentle slope from the alluvial fan of San Antonio Creek in the San Gabriel Mountains to the north.

In its early years, Pomona quickly expanded from its initial home in Sumner Hall, constructing several buildings to accommodate its growing enrollment and ambitions. Starting in 1908, development of the campus was guided by master plans from architect Myron Hunt, who envisioned a central quadrangle flanked by buildings connected via visual axes. In 1923, landscape architect Ralph Cornell expanded on Hunt's plans, envisioning a "college in a garden" defined by native Southern California vegetation but incorporating global influences in the tradition of the acclimatization movement. President James Blaisdell's decision to purchase undeveloped land around Pomona while it was still available later gave the college room to grow and found the consortium. Many of the earlier buildings were constructed in the Mission Revival and Spanish Colonial Revival styles, with stucco walls and red terracotta tile roofs. Other and later construction incorporated elements of neoclassical, Victorian, Italian Romanesque, modern, and postmodern styles. As a result, the present campus features a blend of architectural styles. Most buildings are three or fewer stories in height, and are designed to facilitate both indoor and outdoor use.

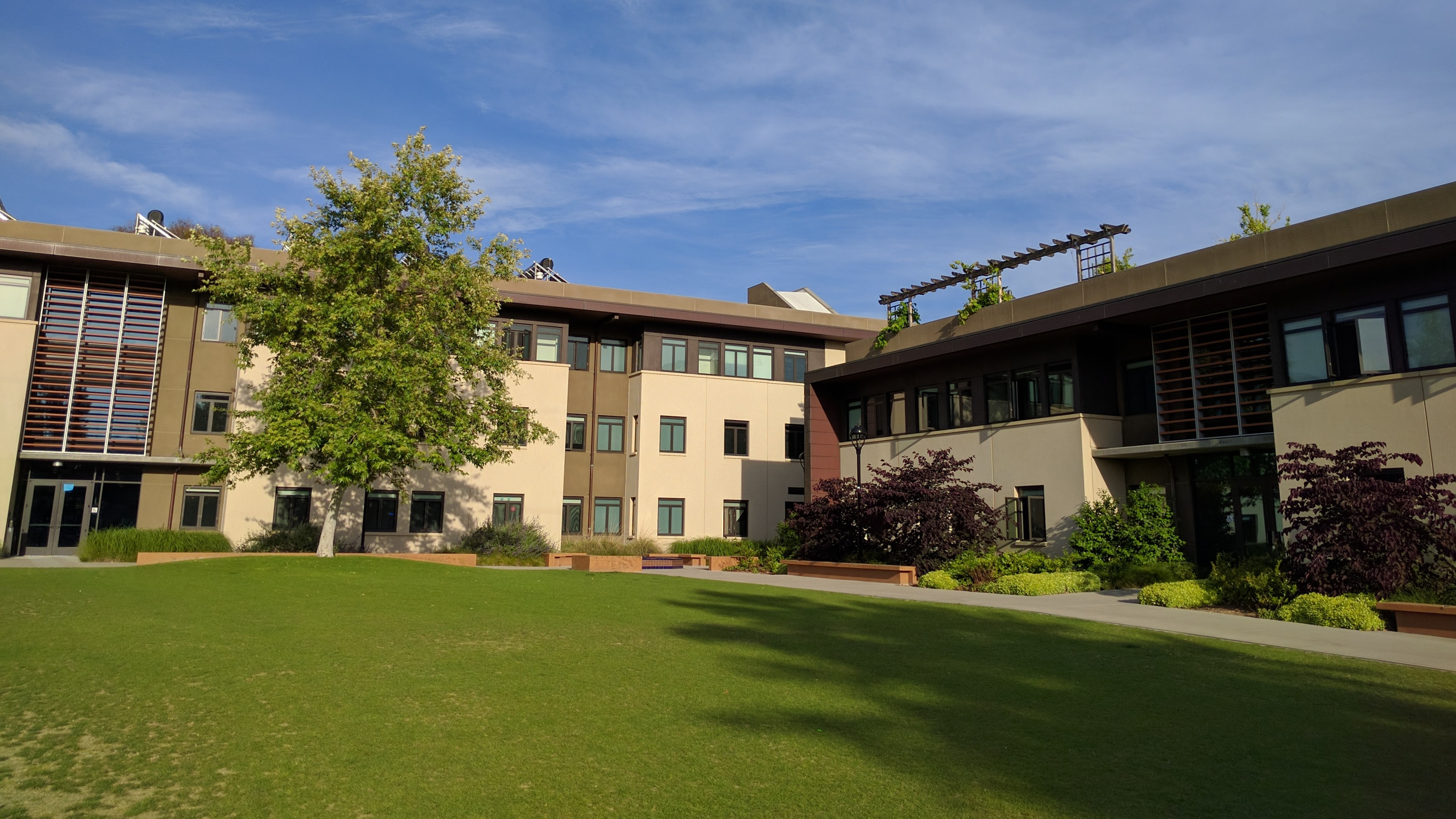
Dialynas and Sontag residence halls, built 2011, are LEED Platinum certified. (view as a 360° interactive panorama)

The campus consists of 88 facilities as of 2023, including 70 addressed buildings. It is bounded by First Street on the south, Mills and Amherst Avenues on the east, Eighth Street on the north, and Harvard Avenue on the west. It is informally divided into North Campus and South Campus by Sixth Street, with most academic buildings in the western half and a naturalistic area known as the Wash in the east. It has been featured in numerous films and television shows, often standing in for other schools.

Pomona has undertaken initiatives to make its campus more sustainable, including requiring that all new construction be built to LEED Gold standards, replacing turf with drought-tolerant landscaping, and committing to achieving carbon neutrality without the aid of purchased carbon credits by 2030. The Association for the Advancement of Sustainability in Higher Education gave the college a gold rating in its 2018 Sustainable Campus Index.

=== South Campus ===
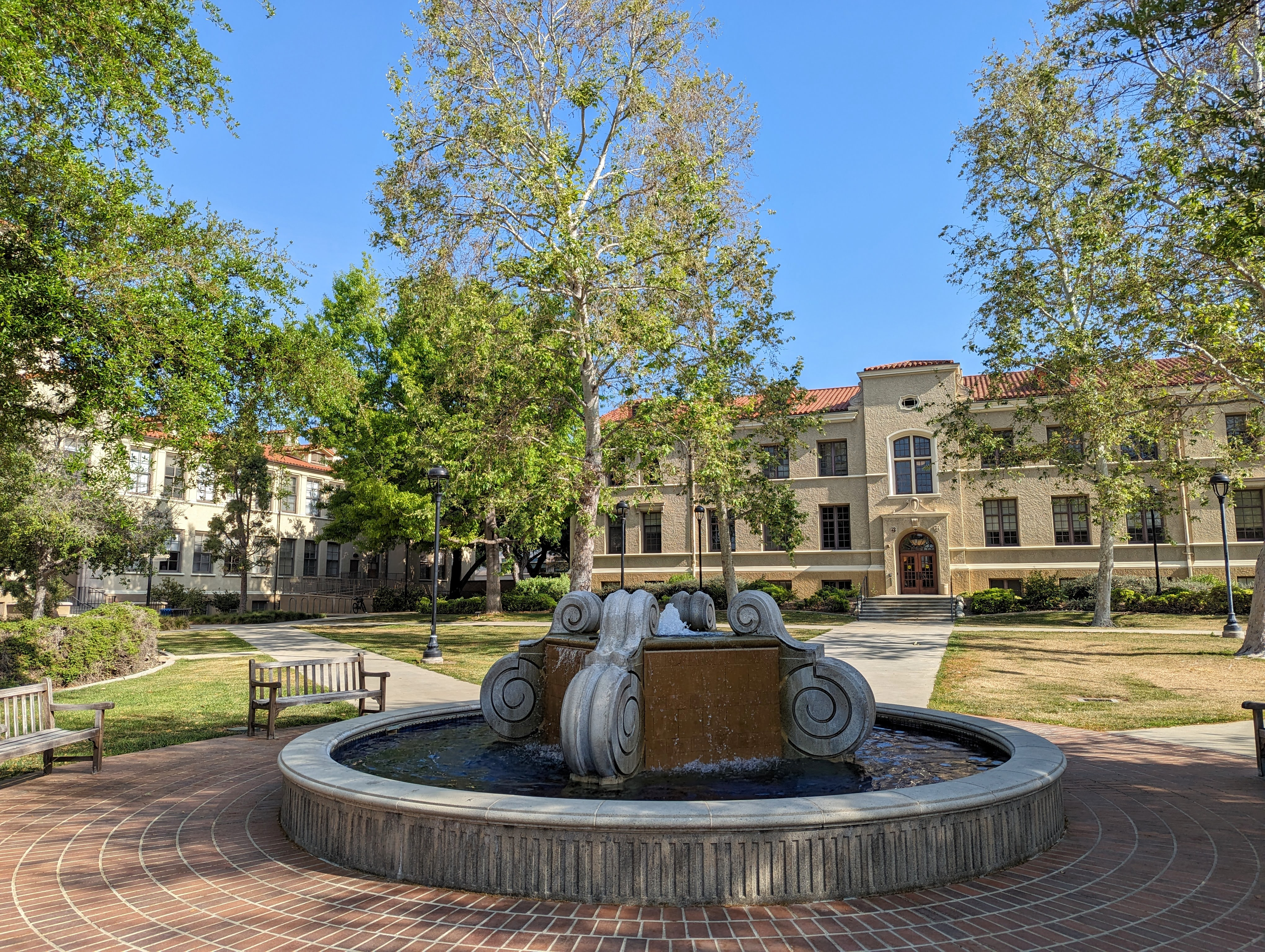
The Stanley Academic Quadrangle is home to many of Pomona's humanities departments. (view as a 360° interactive panorama)

South Campus consists of mostly first-year and second-year housing and academic buildings for the social sciences, arts, and humanities.

A row of four residence halls is south of Bonita Avenue, with Frank Dining Hall at the eastern end. Sumner Hall, the home of admissions and several other administrative departments, is to the north of the dormitories. Oldenborg Center, a foreign-language housing option that includes a foreign-language dining hall, is across from Sumner.

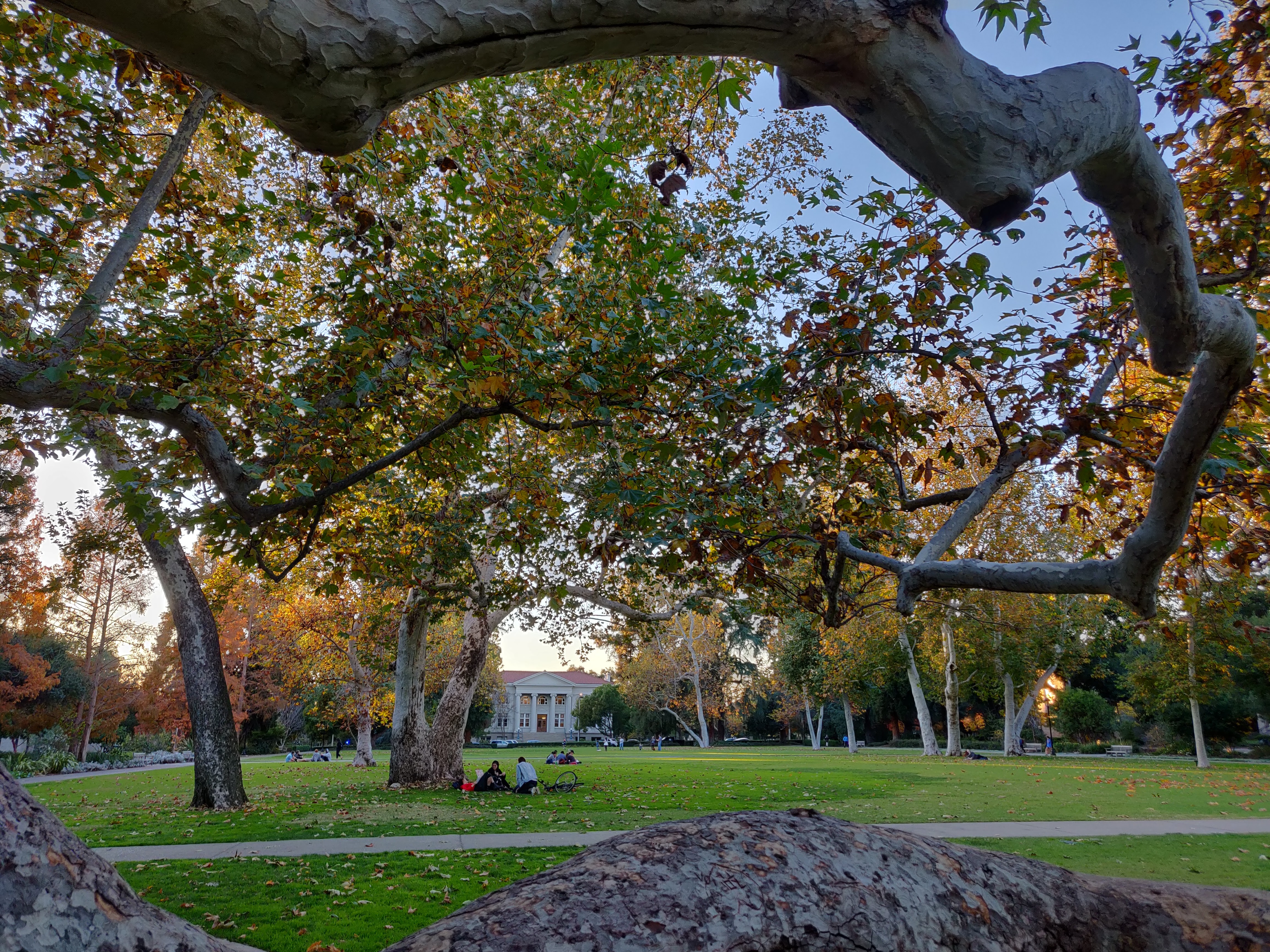
Marston Quadrangle forms the center of Pomona's campus. (view as a 360° interactive panorama)

South Campus has several arts buildings and performance venues. Bridges Auditorium ("Big Bridges") is used for concerts and speakers and has a capacity of 2,500. Bridges Hall of Music ("Little Bridges") is a concert hall with seating for 550. On the western edge of campus is the Benton Museum of Art, which has a collection of approximately 21,000 items, including Italian Renaissance panel paintings, indigenous American art and artifacts, and American and European prints, drawings, and photographs. The Seaver Theatre Complex has a 335-seat thrust stage theater and 125-seat black box theater, among other facilities. The Studio Art Hall garnered national recognition for its steel-frame design when it was completed in 2014.

Pomona's main social science and humanities buildings are located west of College Avenue. They include the Carnegie Building, a neoclassical structure built in 1908 as a Carnegie library. Several historic Victorian houses line the southern portion of the avenue, including the Helen Goodwin Renwick House, which was listed on the National Register of Historic Places in 2016.

Marston Quadrangle, a 5-acre (2 ha) lawn framed by California sycamore and coastal redwood trees, serves as a central artery for the campus, anchored by Carnegie on the west and Bridges Auditorium on the east. To its north is Alexander Hall, the college's central administration building, and the Smith Campus Center (SCC), home to many student services and communal spaces. East of the SCC is the Center for Athletics, Recreation and Wellness (Pomona's primary indoor athletics and recreation facility) and Smiley Hall dormitory, built in 1908.

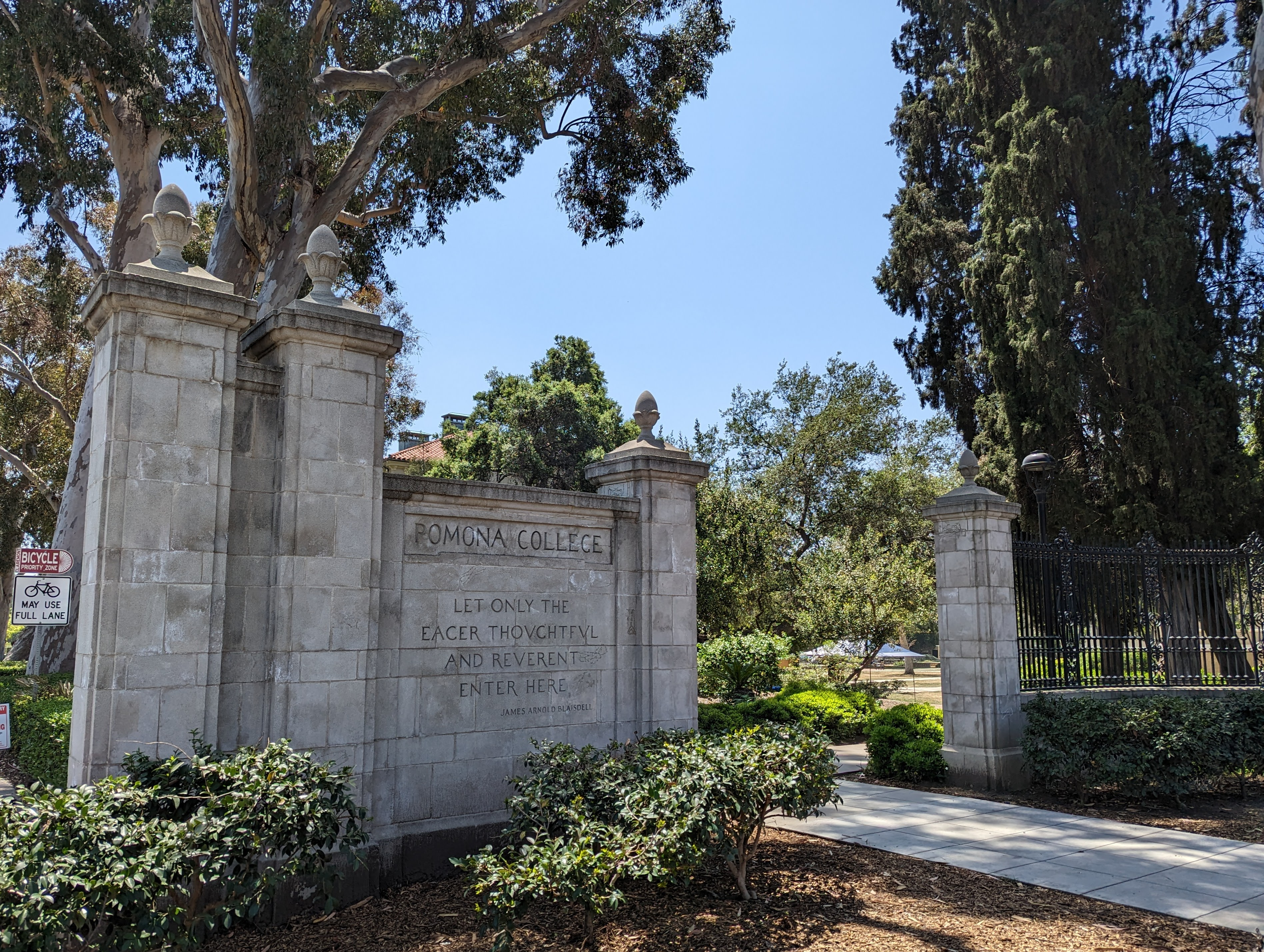
The college gates historically marked the northern edge of Pomona's campus.

At the intersection of Sixth Street and College Avenue are the college gates, built in 1914, which mark the historical northern edge of the campus. They bear two quotes from President Blaisdell. On the north is "let only the eager, thoughtful and reverent enter here", and on the south is "They only are loyal to this college who departing bear their added riches in trust for mankind". Per campus tradition, enrolling students walk south through the gates during orientation and seniors walk north through them shortly before graduation.

The less-developed 40-acre (16 ha) eastern portion of the campus is known as the Wash (formally Blanchard Park), and contains a large grove of coast live oak trees, as well as many of the college's athletics facilities, an outdoor amphitheater, an astronomical observatory, and the Pomona College Organic Farm, an experiment in sustainable agriculture.

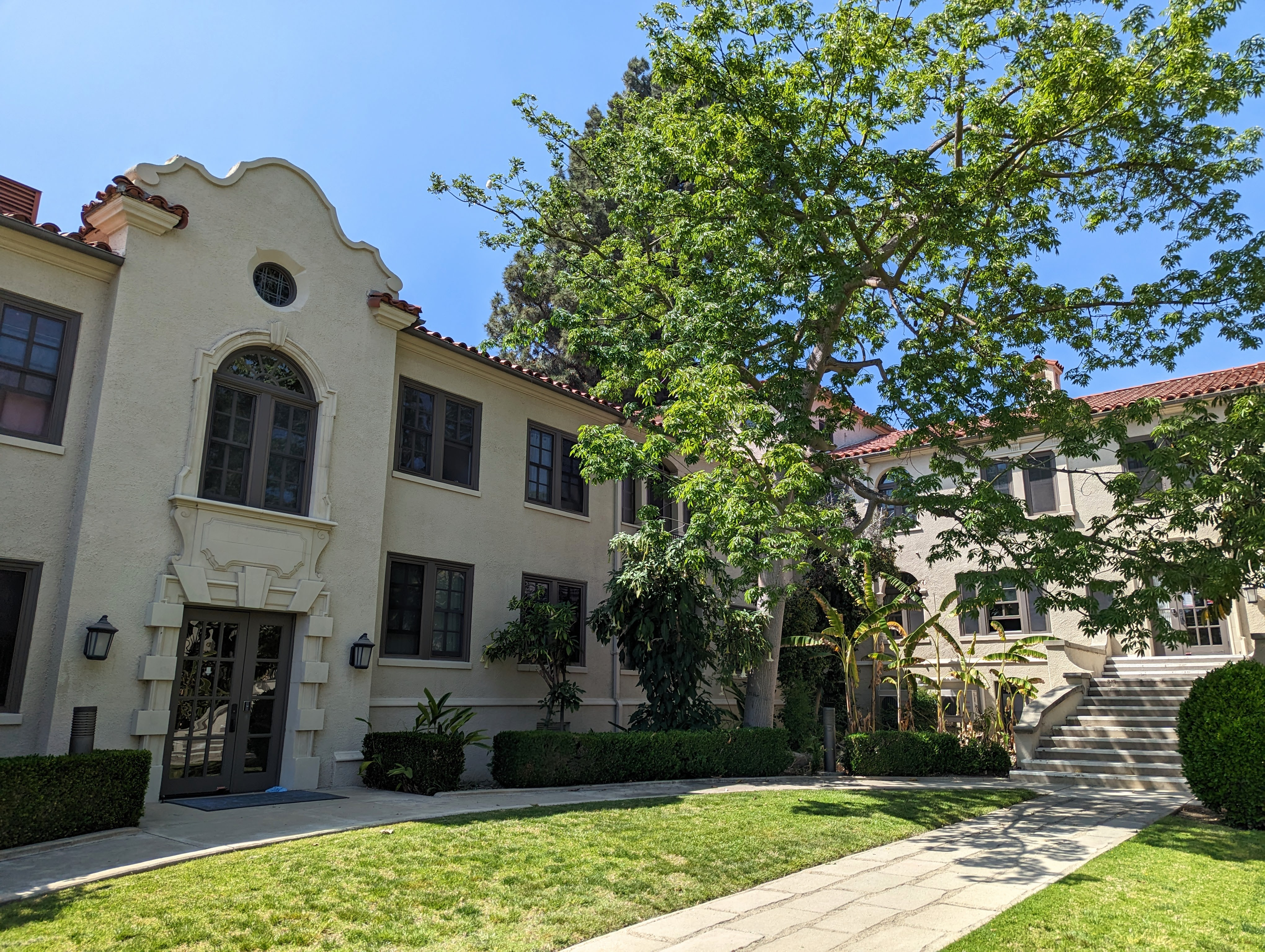
Harwood Court
(view as a 360° interactive panorama)

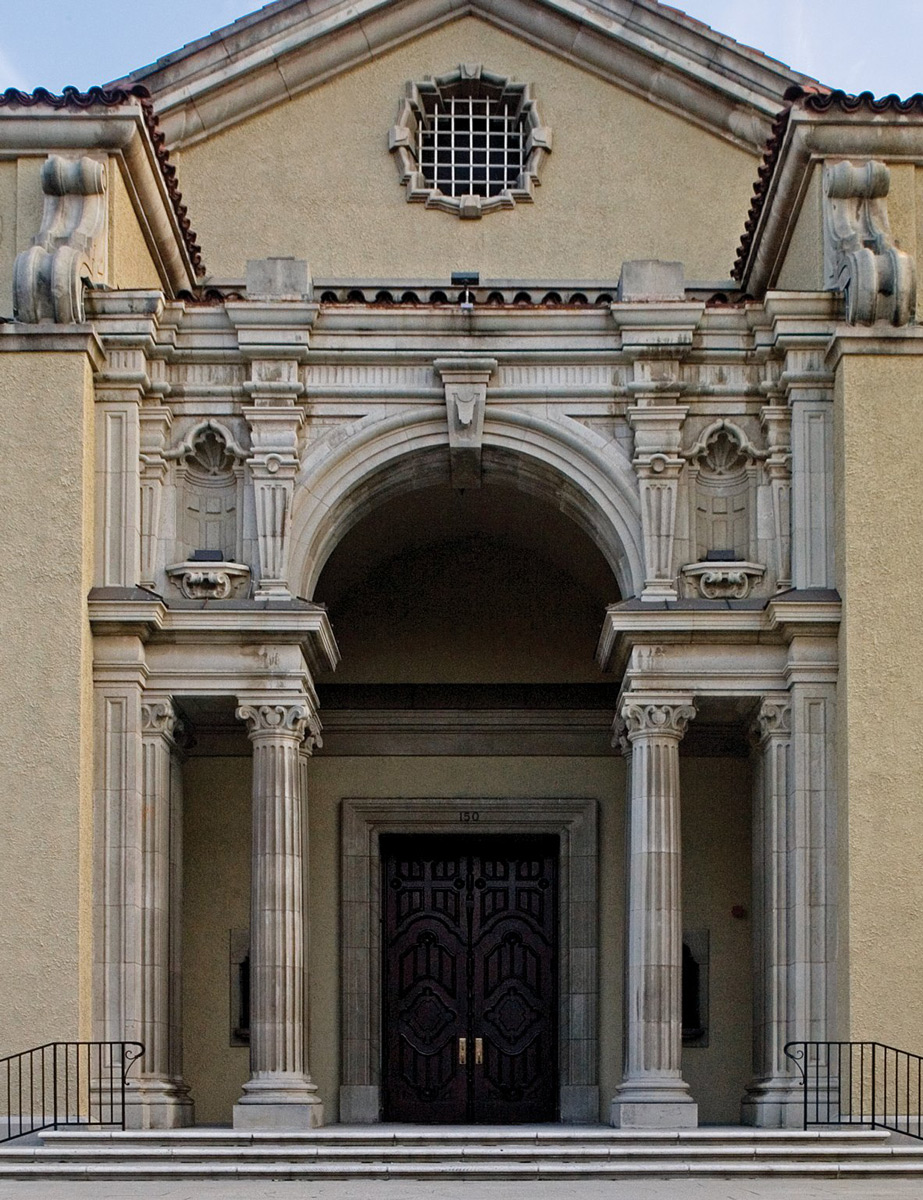
Bridges Hall of Music

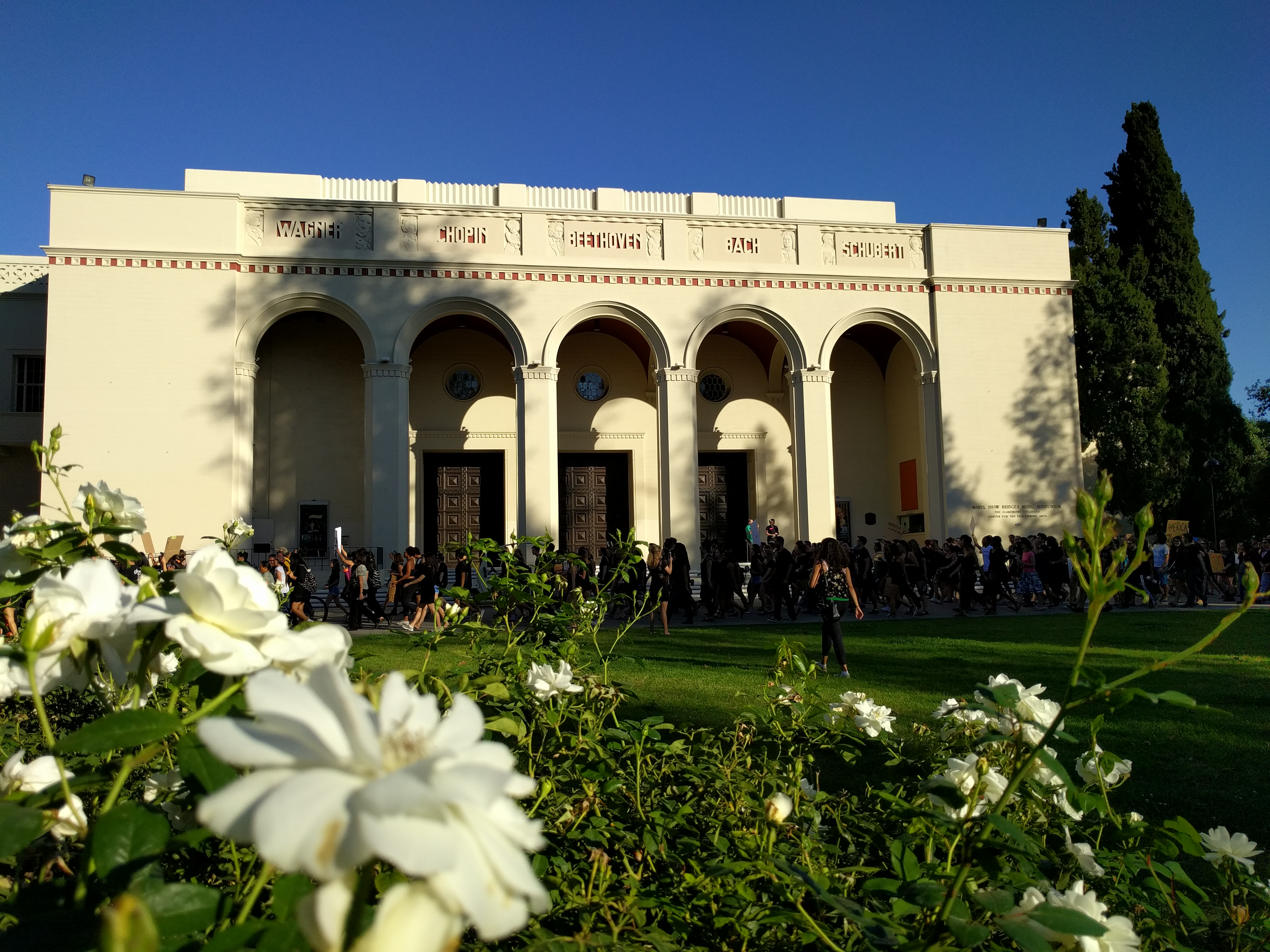
Bridges Auditorium

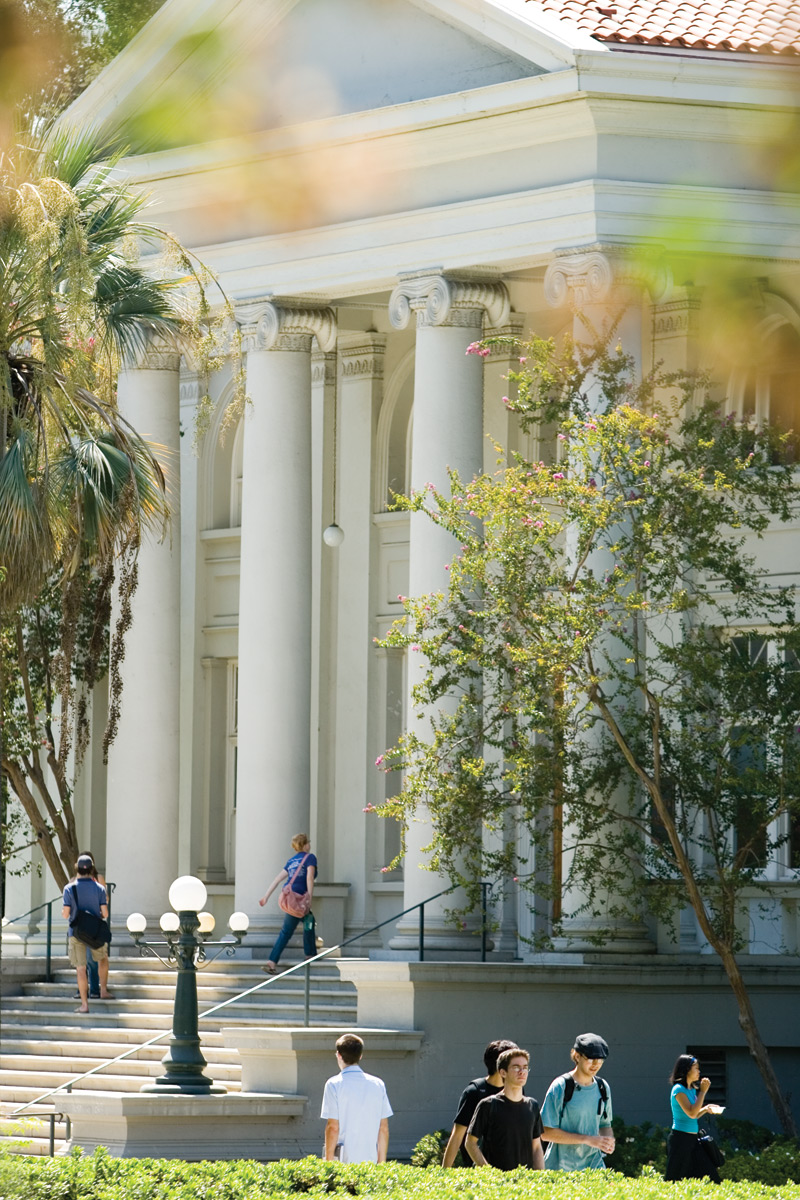
The Carnegie Building

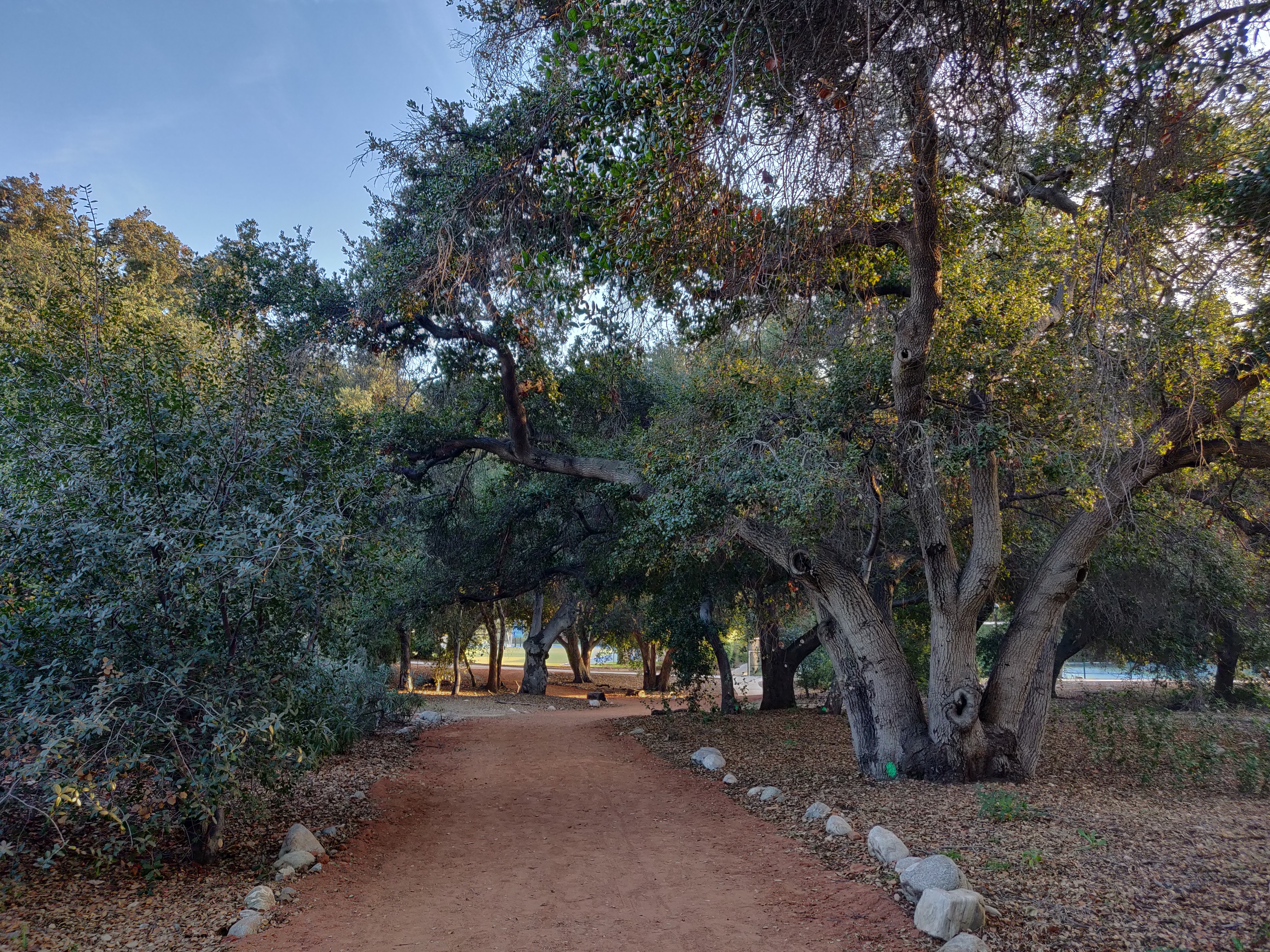
The Wash

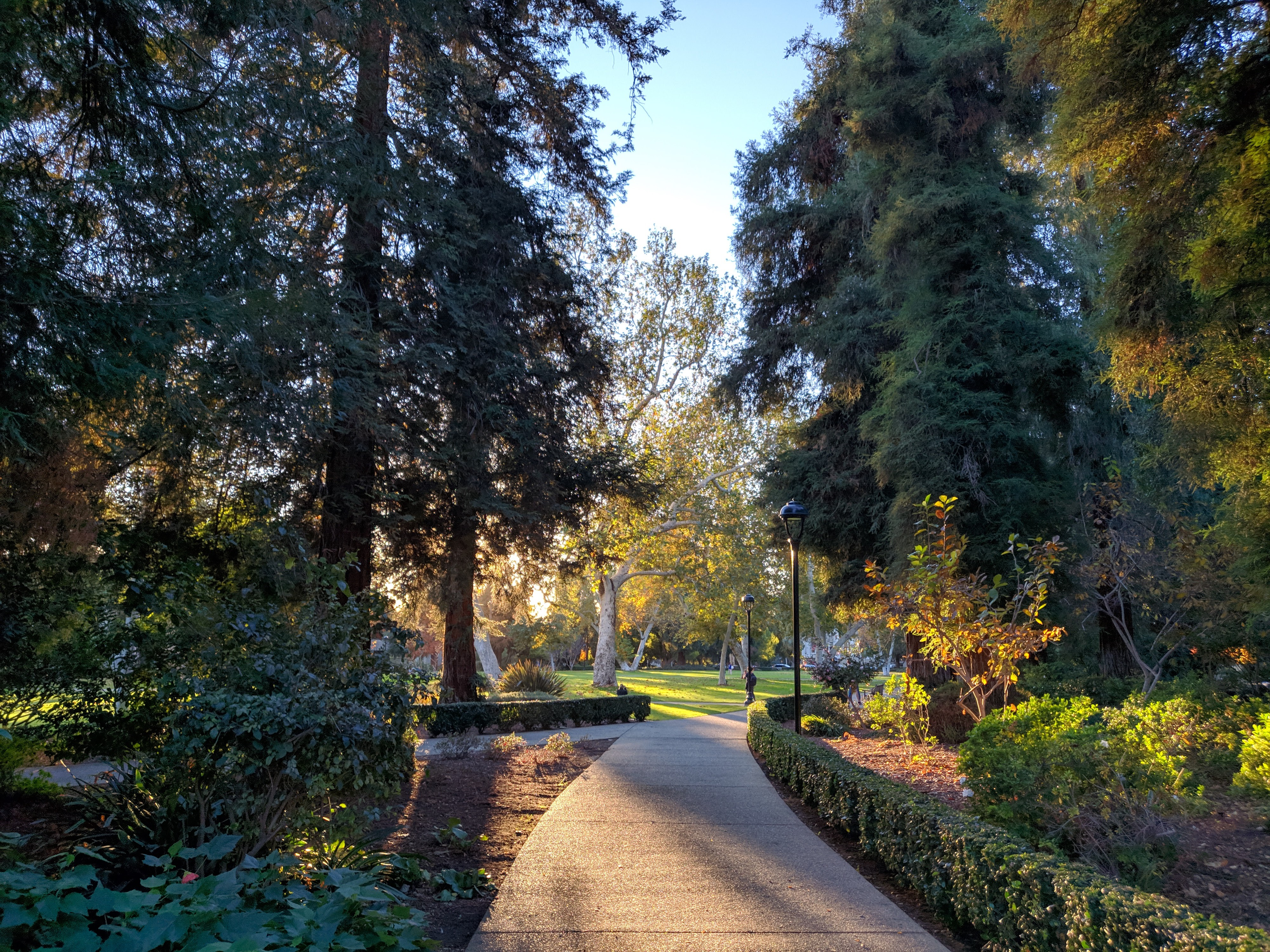
Path to Marston Quad

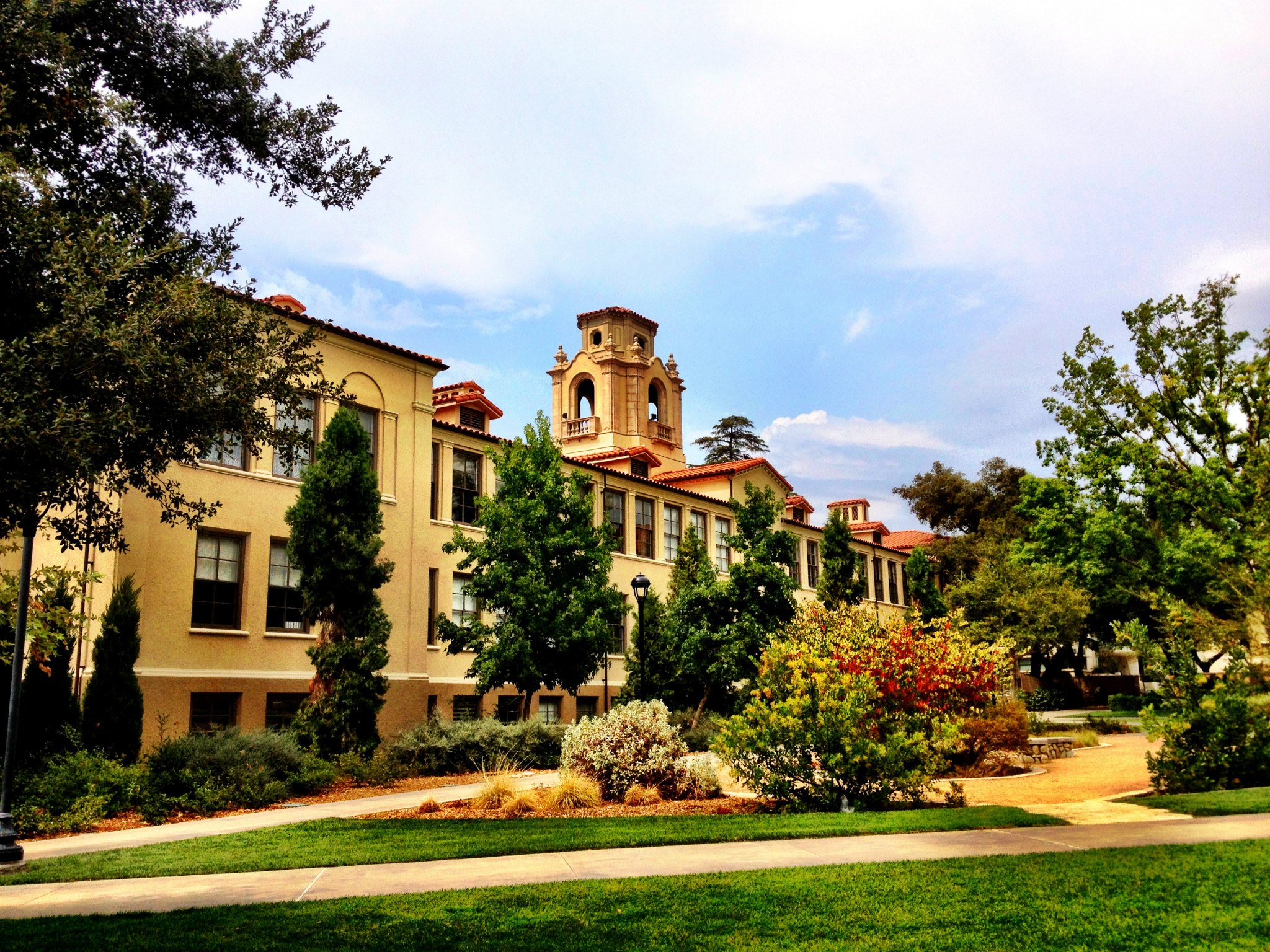
Mason Hall

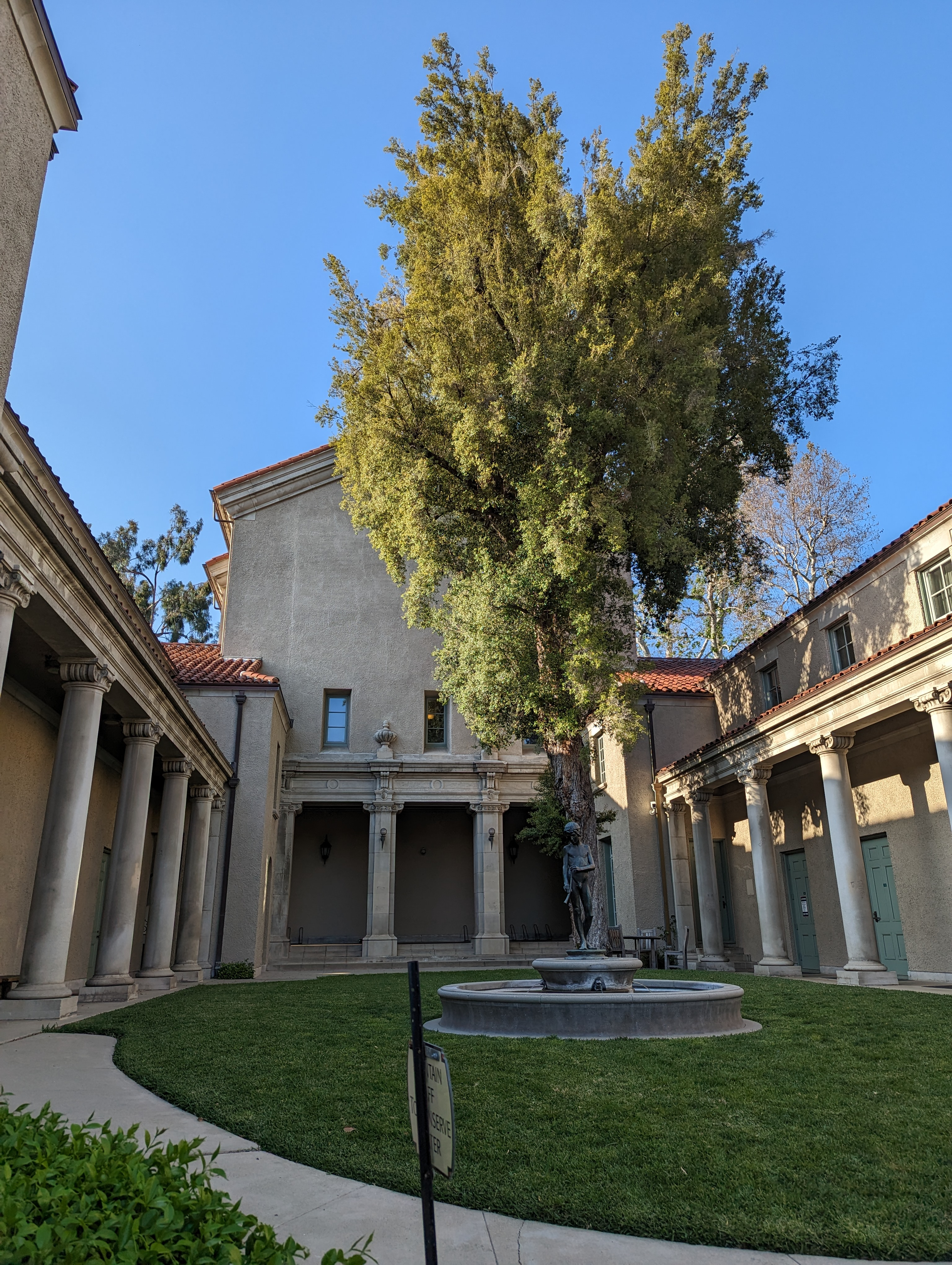
Lebus Court

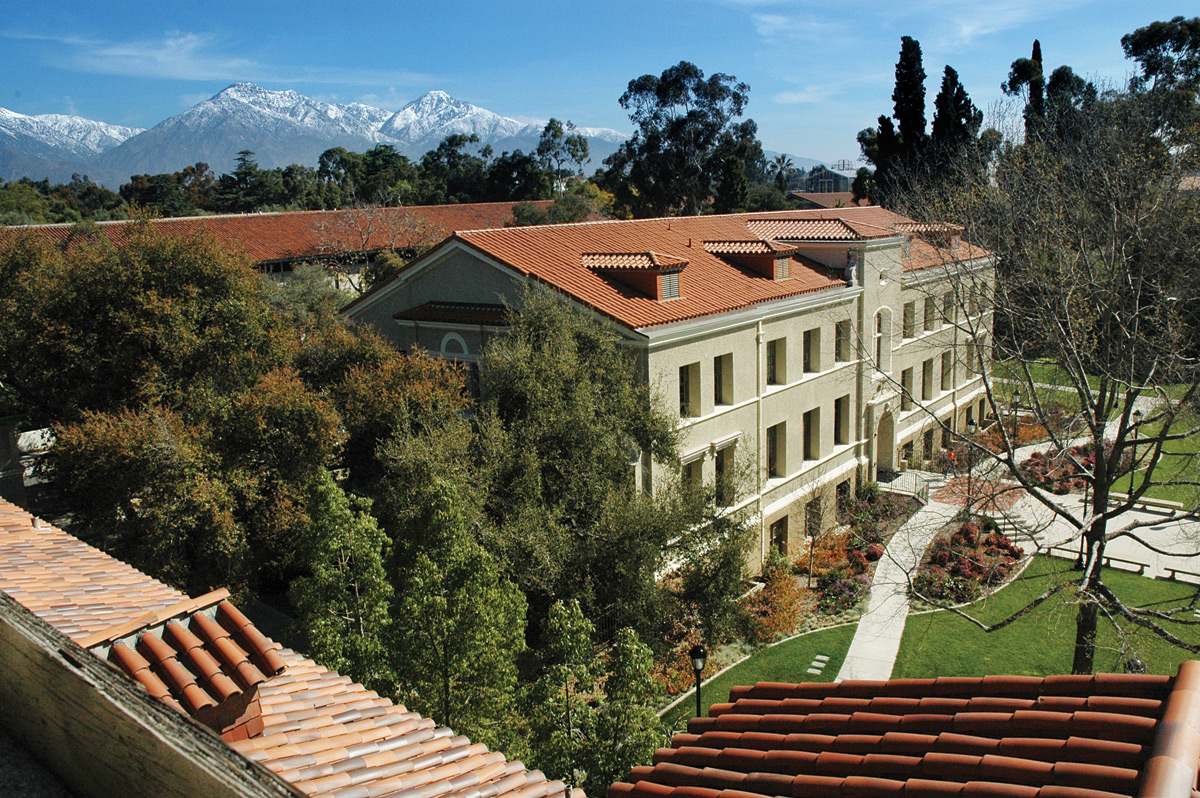
Crookshank Hall

=== North Campus ===
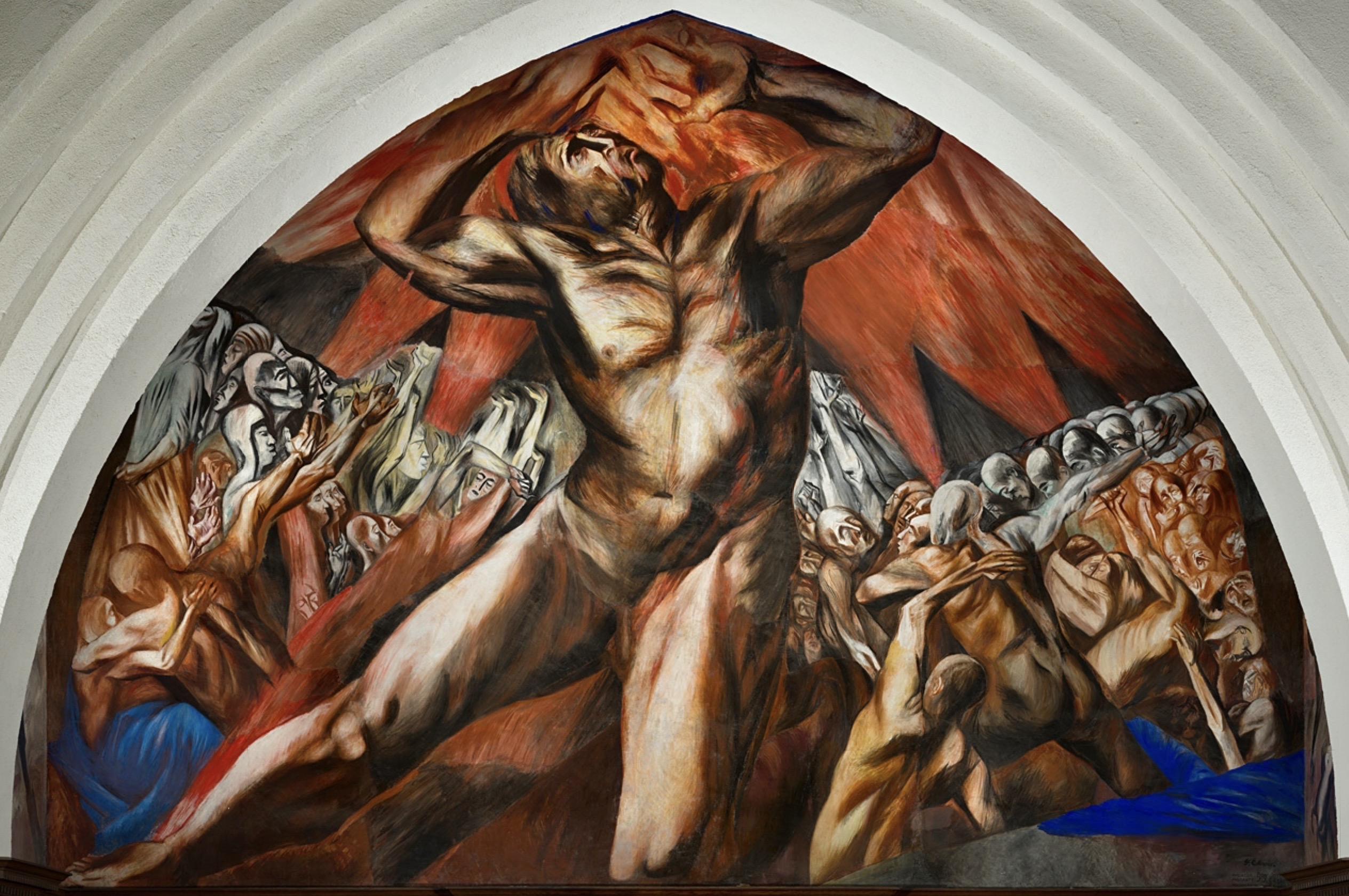
Prometheus mural in Frary Dining Hall

North Campus was designed by architect Sumner Spaulding, and its initial phase was completed in 1930. It consists primarily of residential buildings for third- and fourth-year students and academic buildings for the natural sciences.

The academic buildings are located to the west of North College Way. This area includes Dividing the Light (2007), a skyspace by Light and Space artist and alumnus James Turrell.

The residence halls include the Clark halls (I, III, and V (Note: The Clark numberings are derived from Spaulding's original plan for North Campus. Clark II became Frary Dining Hall, Clark VI became Walker Hall, and Clark VII became Walker Lounge; Clark IV and Clark VIII were never built.)) and several more recent constructions. The North Campus dining hall, Frary Dining Hall, features a vaulted ceiling and is the location of the murals Prometheus (1930) by José Clemente Orozco, the first Mexican fresco in the U.S., and Genesis (1960) by Rico Lebrun.

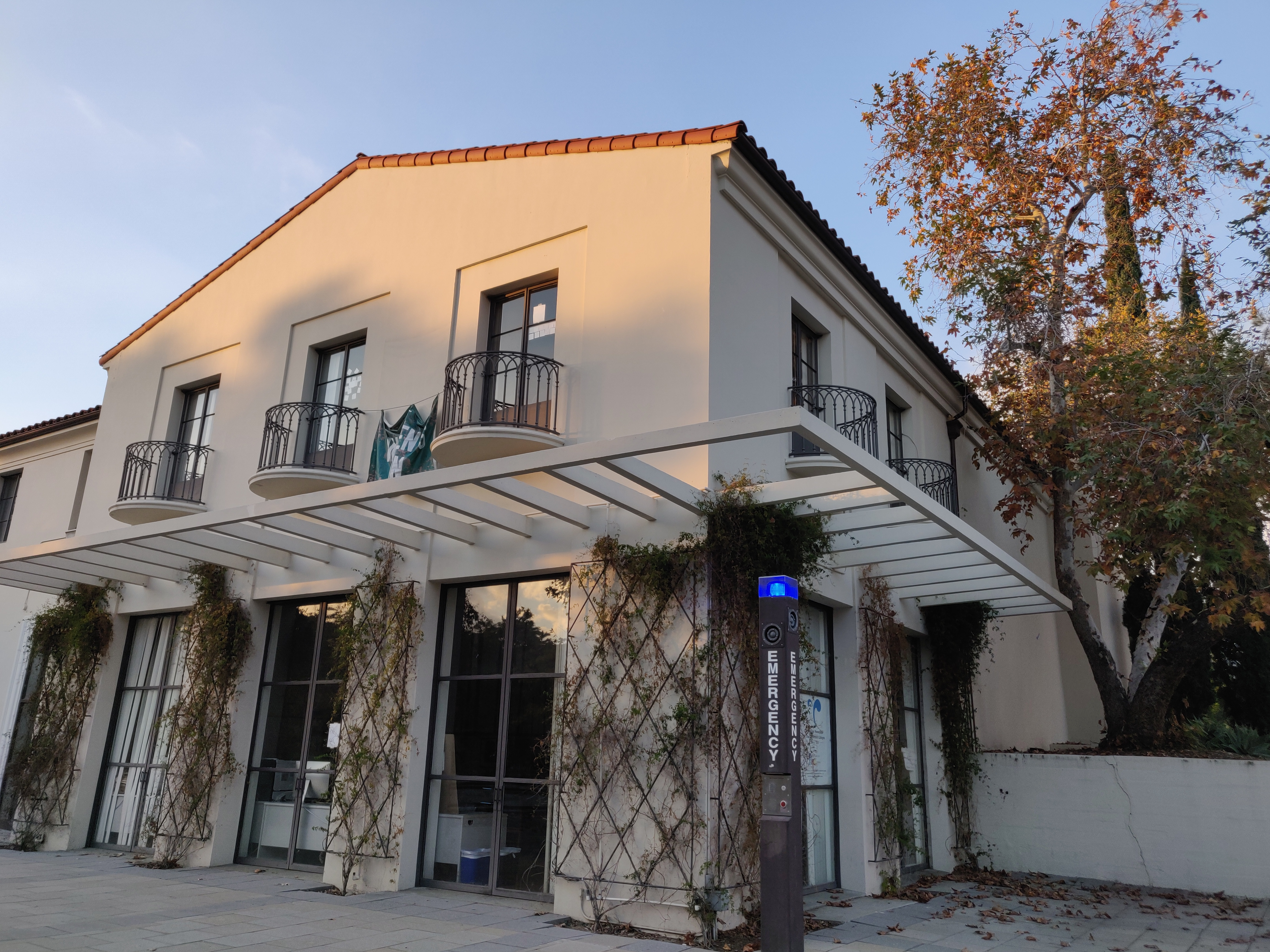
Walker Hall

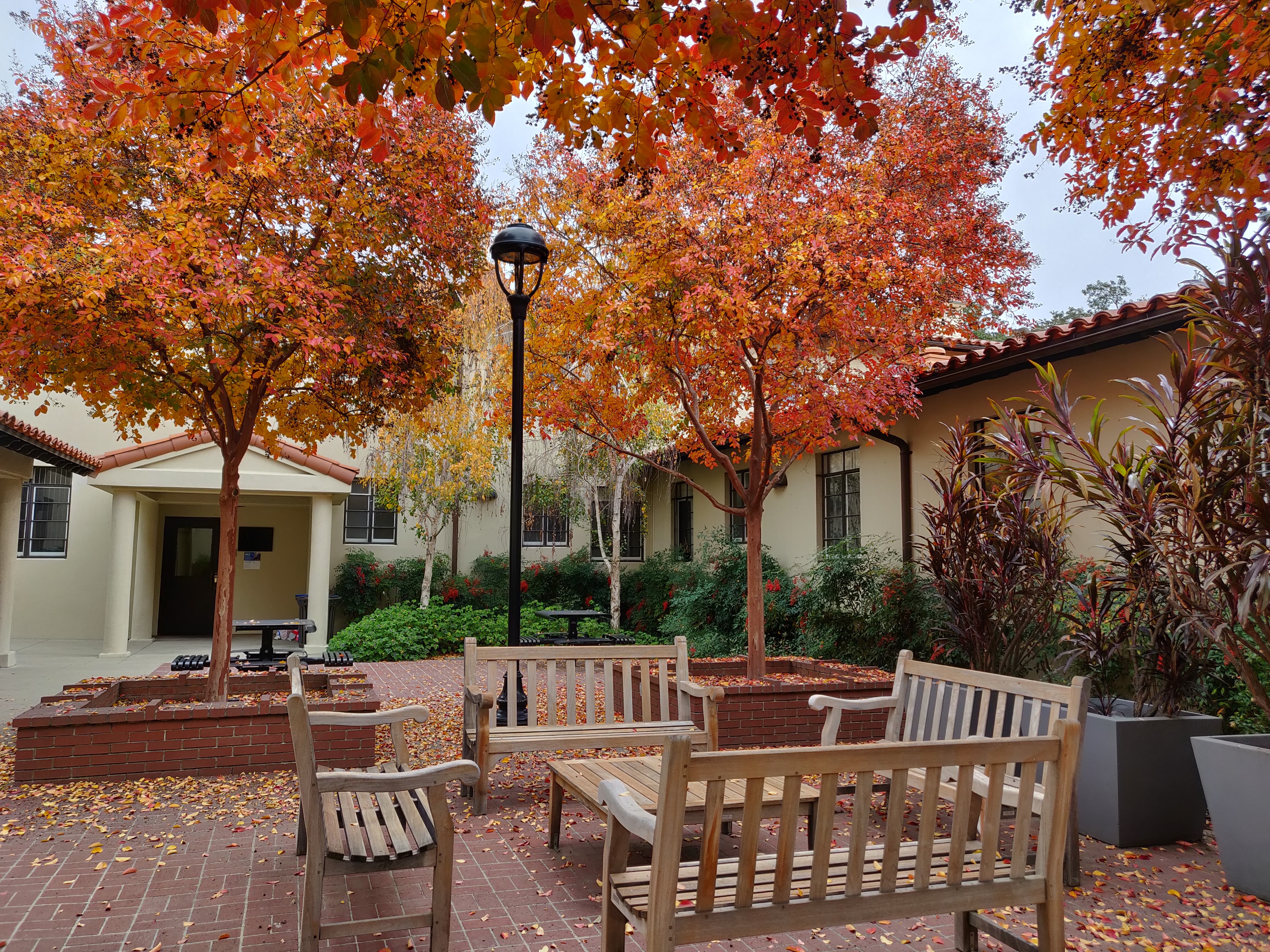
Norton-Clark III courtyard

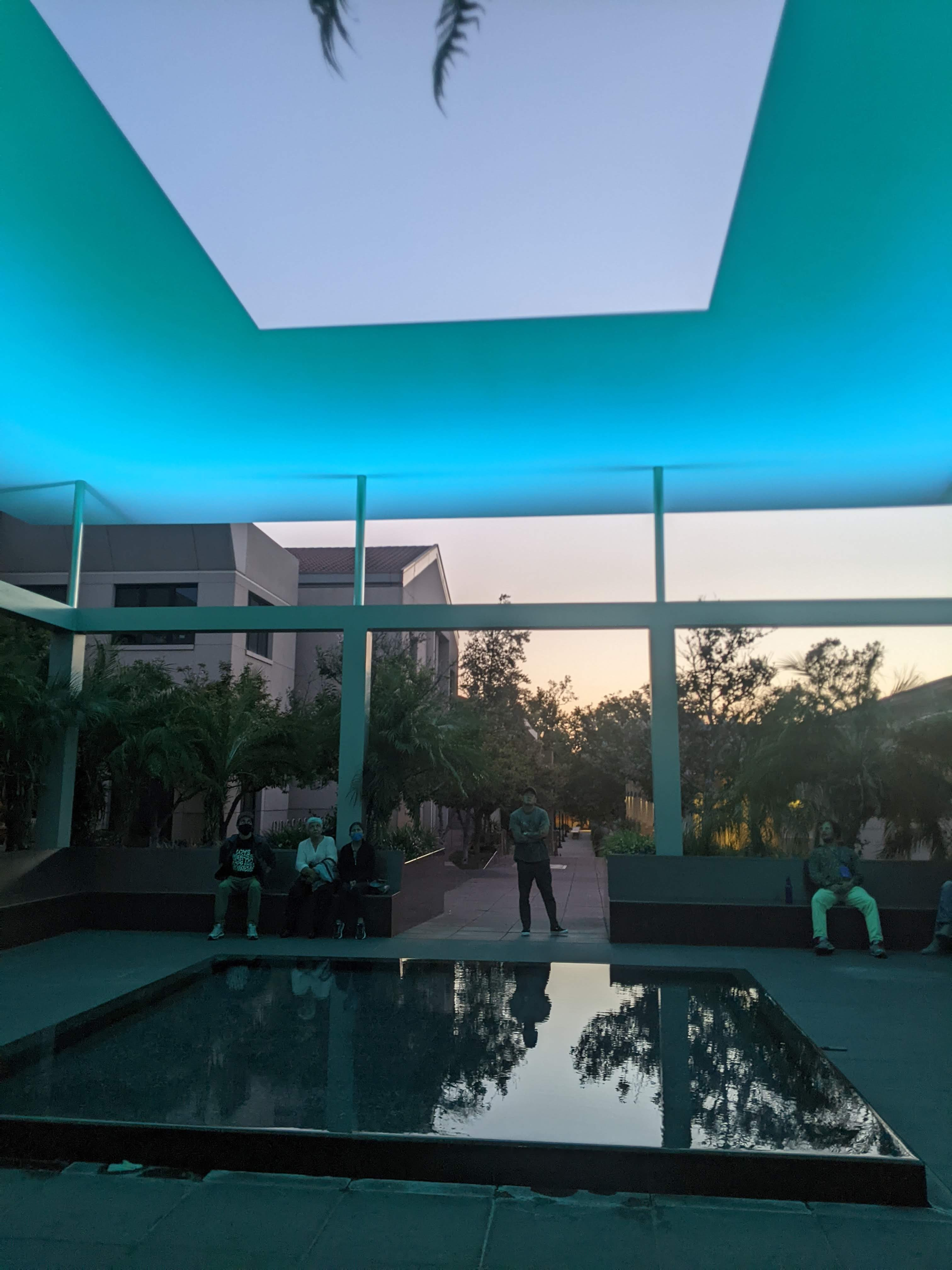
Dividing the Light skyspace

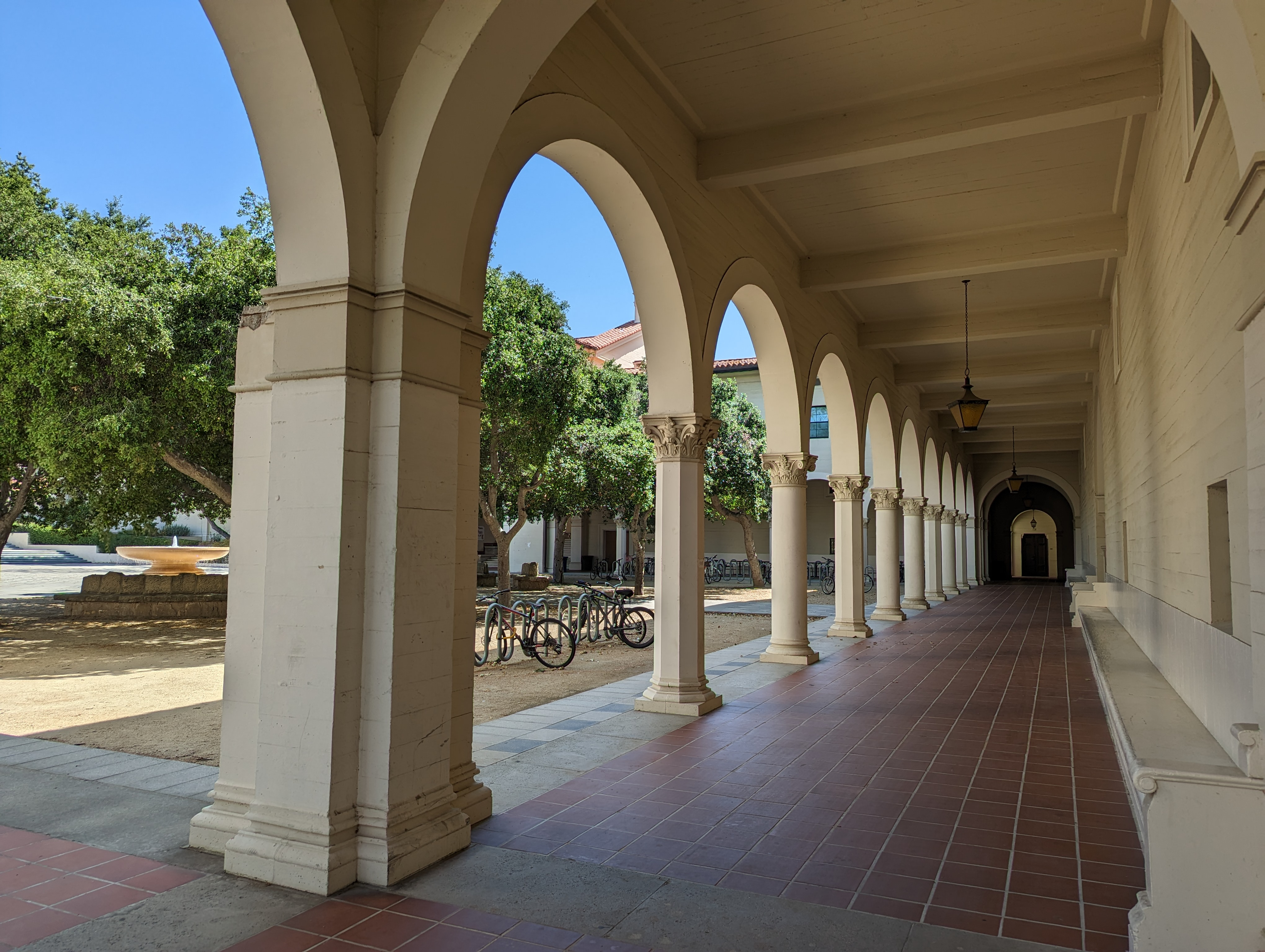
Arcade along Bixby Plaza
(view as a 360° interactive panorama)

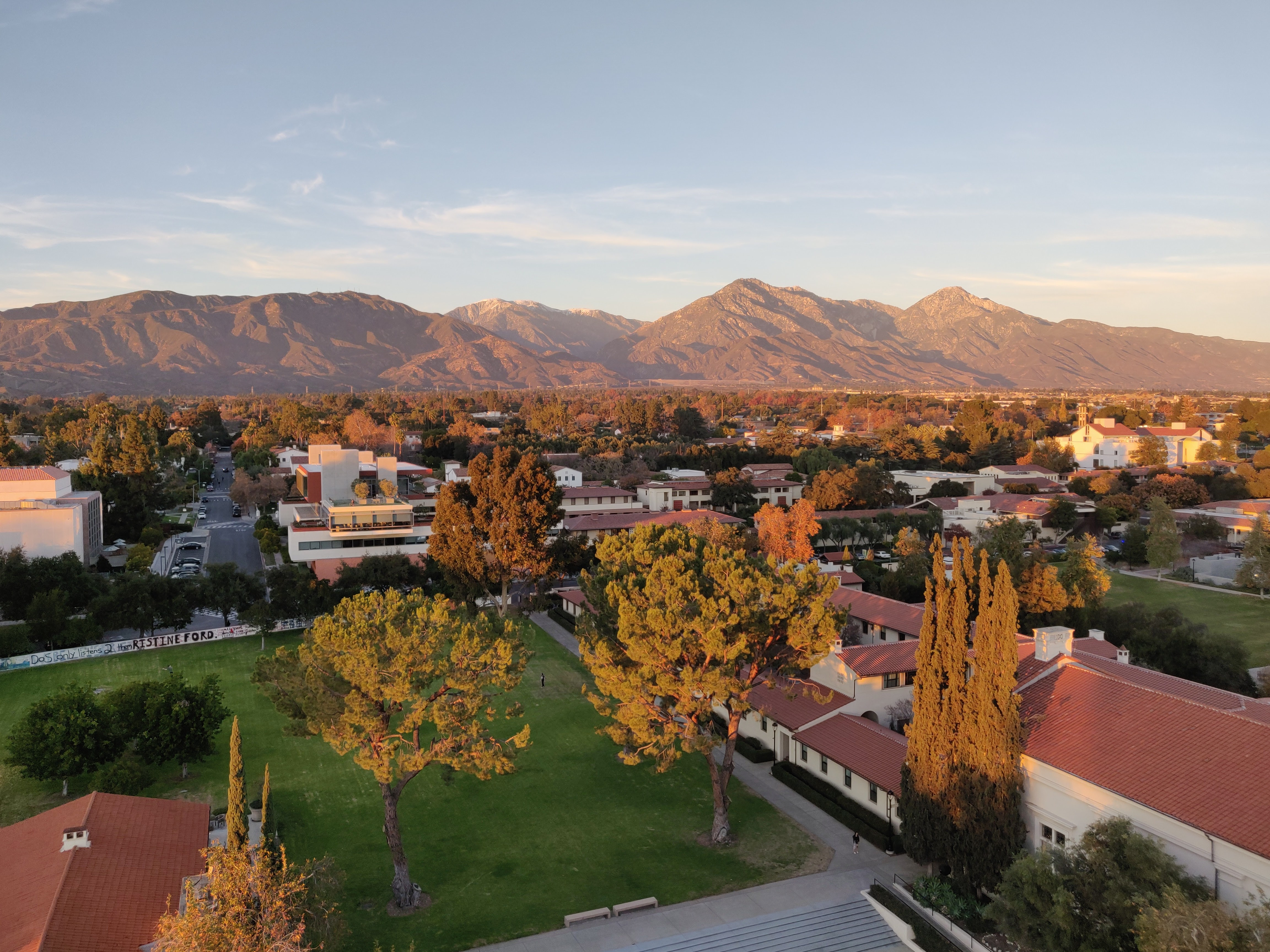
Walker Beach, looking north

=== Other facilities ===
The college owns the 53-acre (21 ha) Trails Ends Ranch (a wilderness area in the Webb Canyon north of campus), the 320-acre (130 ha) Mildred Pitt Ranch in southeastern Monterey County, and the Halona Lodge retreat center in Idyllwild, California. The astronomy department built and operates a telescope at the Table Mountain Observatory in Big Pines, California.

Along the north side of campus are several joint buildings maintained by The Claremont Colleges Services. The Claremont Colleges Library (also known as Honnold/Mudd Library) holds more than 3.4 million items as of 2023, of which 1 million are physical and 2.3 million are digital. The consortium also owns the Robert J. Bernard Field Station north of Foothill Boulevard.

== Organization and administration ==
=== Governance ===
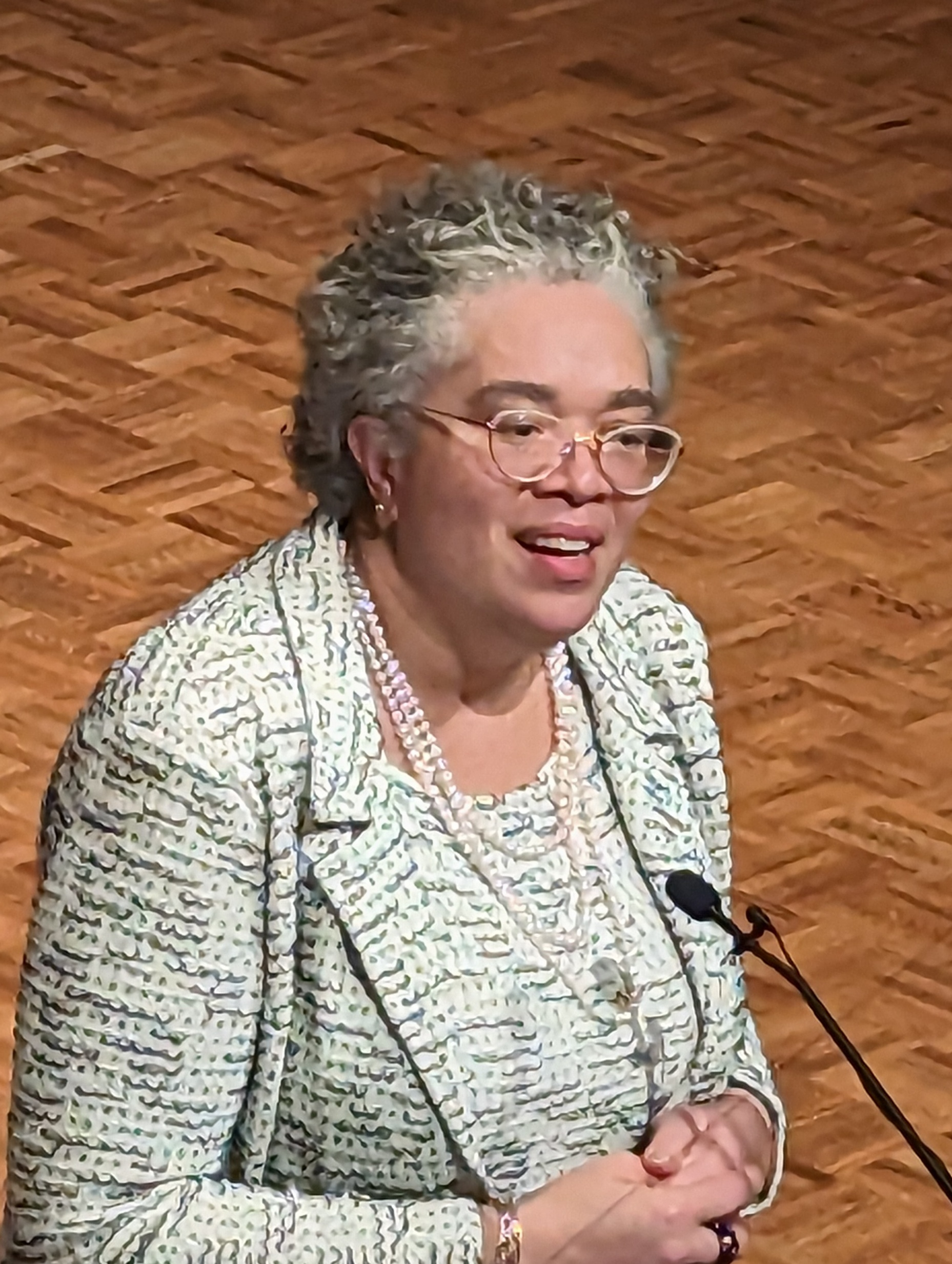
President G. Gabrielle Starr in 2023

Pomona is governed as a private, nonprofit organization by a board of trustees responsible for overseeing the long-term interests of the college. The board consists of up to 42 members, most of whom are elected by existing members to four-year terms with a term limit of 12 years. (Note: The unelected trustees consist of the college's president and two non-voting ex-officio members, the chair of the alumni association and chair of national giving. At least 10 trustees must be alumni, including one who has graduated within the last 11 years.) It is responsible for hiring the college's president (G. Gabrielle Starr since 2017), approving budgets, setting overarching policies, and various other tasks. The president, in turn, oversees the college's general operation, assisted by administrative staff and a faculty cabinet. The college has 912 total employees as of the fall 2024 semester.

=== Academic affiliations ===
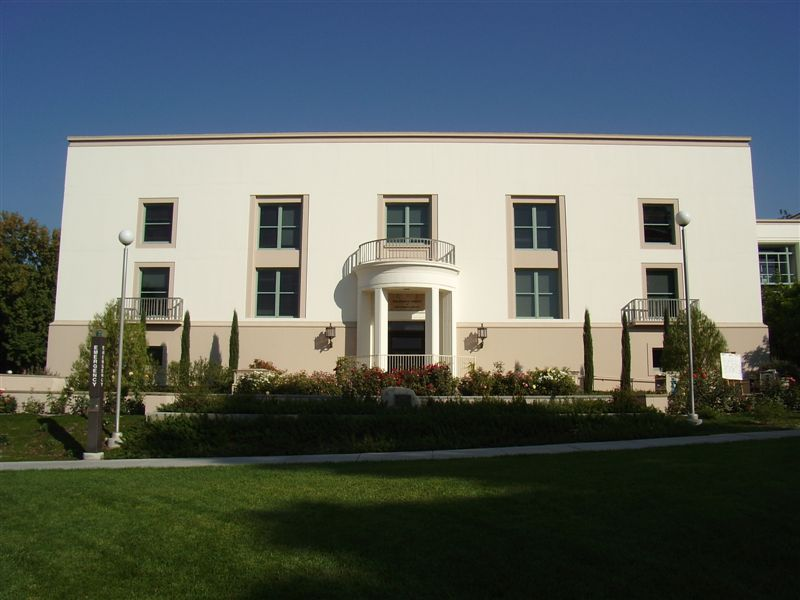
Honnold Library, a shared Claremont Colleges resource

Pomona is the founding member of the Claremont Colleges (colloquially "7Cs", for "seven colleges"), a consortium of five undergraduate liberal arts colleges ("5Cs")—Pomona, Scripps, Claremont McKenna, Harvey Mudd, and Pitzer—and two graduate schools—Claremont Graduate University and Keck Graduate Institute. All are located in Claremont. Although each member has individual autonomy and a distinct identity, there is substantial collaboration through The Claremont Colleges Services (TCCS), a coordinating entity that manages the central library, campus safety services, health services, and other resources. Overall, the 7Cs have been praised by higher education experts for their close cooperation, although there have been occasional tensions. Pomona is the largest undergraduate and wealthiest member.

Pomona is a member of several other consortia of selective colleges, including the Consortium of Liberal Arts Colleges, the Oberlin Group, and the Annapolis Group. The college is accredited by the WASC Senior College and University Commission, which reaffirmed its status in 2021 with particular praise for its diversity initiatives.

=== Finances, costs, and financial aid ===
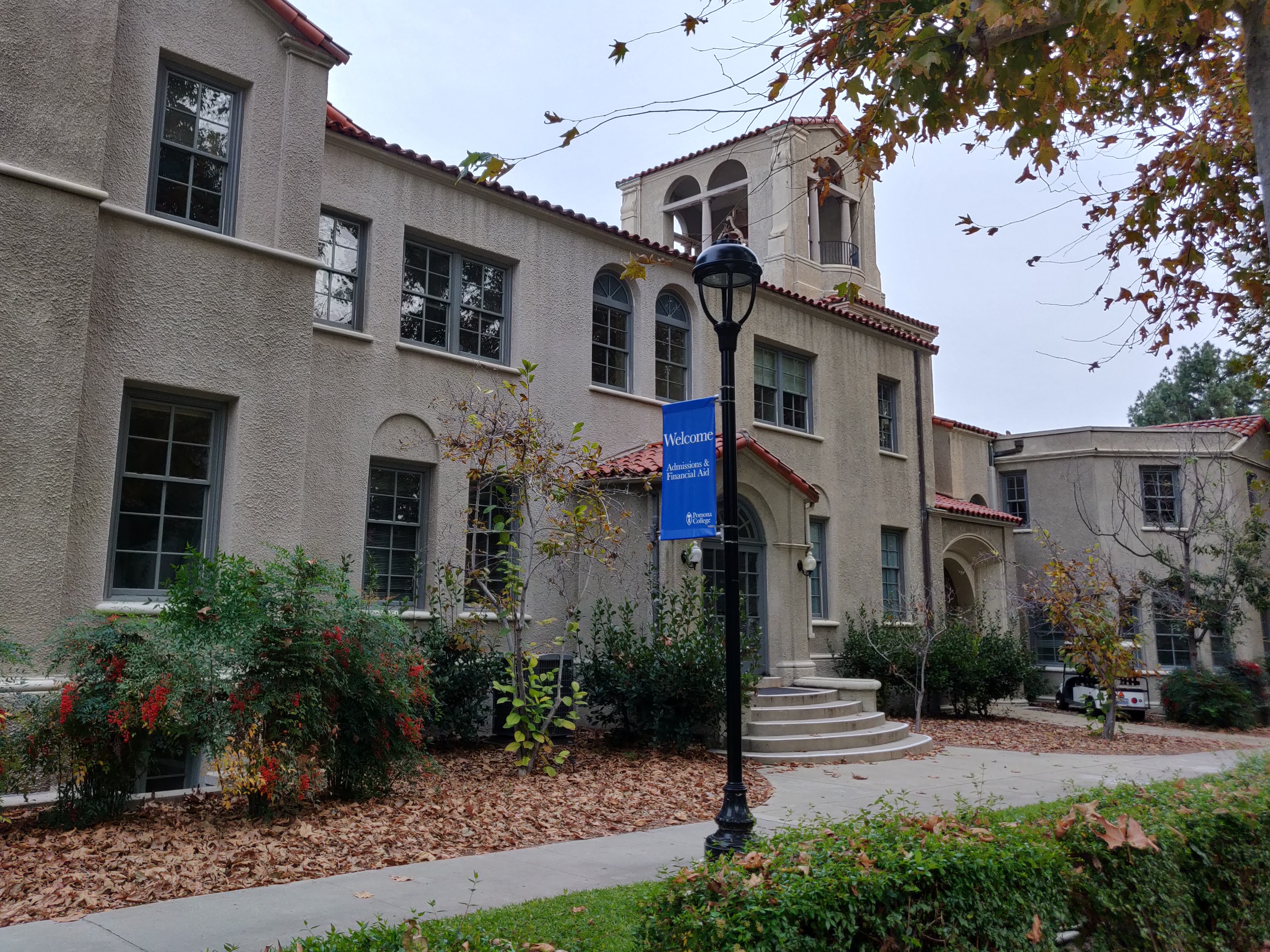
Pomona's office of financial aid is in Sumner Hall.

Pomona has an endowment of $3.25 billion as of June 2025, giving it one of the 10 highest endowments per student of any college or university in the U.S. The college's total assets (including its campus) are valued at $4.2 billion. Its operating budget for the 2025‍–‍2026 academic year was $285 million, of which roughly half was funded by endowment earnings. In the 2023 fiscal year, 43% of the budget was allocated to instruction, 2% to research, 1% to public service, 13% to academic support, 17% to student services, and 24% to institutional support. In 2024, Fitch Ratings gave the college a AAA bond credit rating, its highest rating, reflecting an "extremely strong financial profile".

For the 2026‍–‍2027 academic year, Pomona charged a tuition fee of $71,660, with a total estimated on-campus cost of attendance of $95,670. In 2024‍–‍2025, 55% of students received a financial aid package, with an average award of $67,027, including 42% of international students, who received an average award of $79,064. The college meets the full demonstrated need of all admitted students, including international students, through grants rather than loans. It does not offer merit awards or athletic scholarships.

== Academics ==
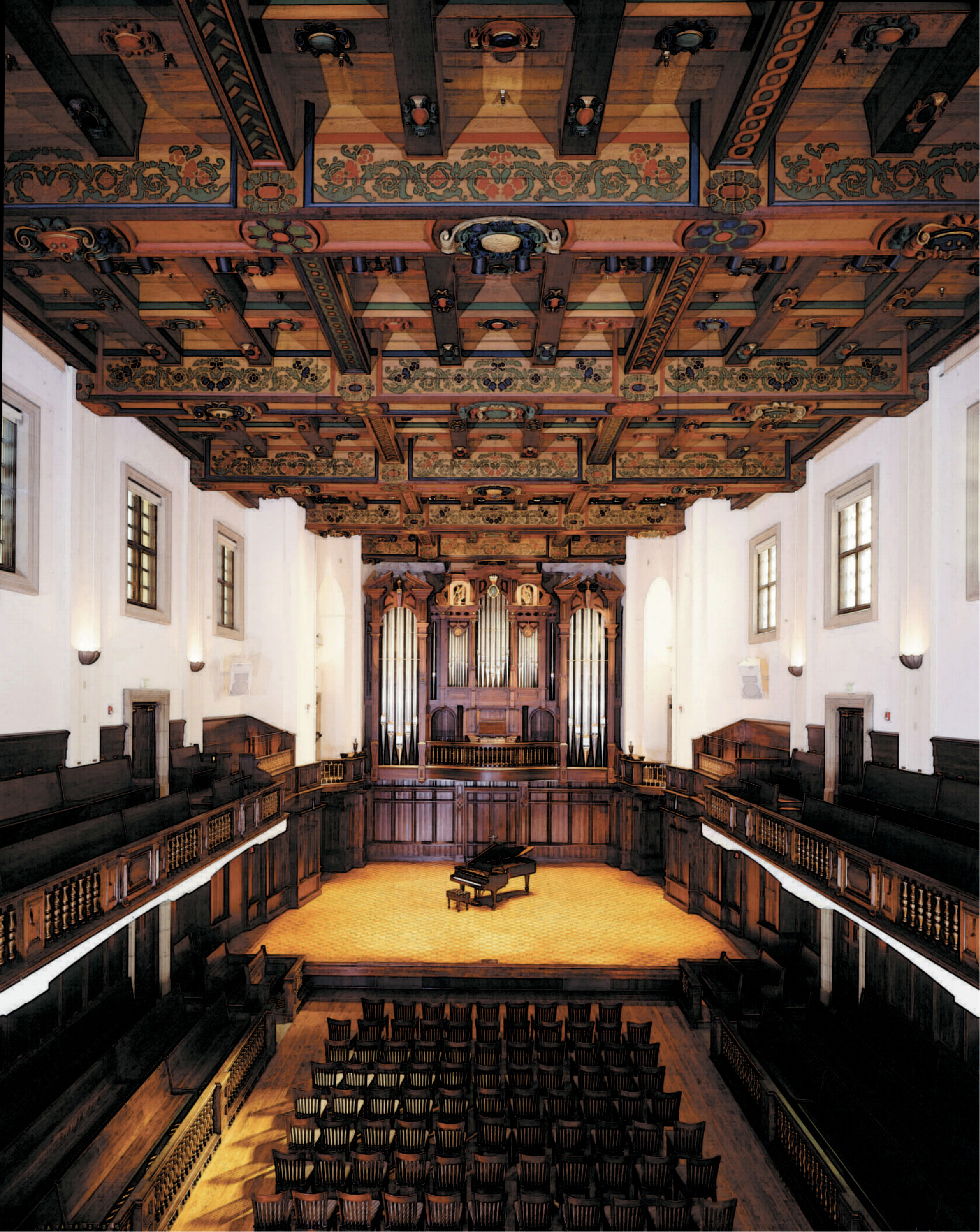
Bridges Hall of Music hosts a variety of performances by the college's musical ensembles.

Pomona offers instruction in the liberal arts disciplines and awards the Bachelor of Arts degree.

Pomona offers 48 majors, most of which also have a corresponding minor. (Note: Students may also petition to create their own custom major.) For the 2023 graduation cohort, 21% of students majored in the arts and humanities, 39% in the natural sciences, 24% in the social sciences, and 16% in interdisciplinary fields. 19% of students completed a double major, 29% completed a minor, and 2% completed multiple minors. The college does not permit majoring in pre-professional disciplines such as medicine or law but offers academic advising for those areas and 3‑2 engineering programs with California Institute of Technology, Dartmouth College, and Washington University in St. Louis.

=== Courses ===
Individually, Pomona offers approximately 650 courses per semester. Additionally, students may take a significant portion (Note: Without special advisor approval, first-year students may cross-enroll for one course per semester, and others may cross-enroll for up to 40% of their total credits.) of their courses at the other Claremont Colleges, enabling access to approximately 2,700 courses total. The academic calendars and registration procedures across the colleges are synchronized and consolidated, and there are no additional fees for cross-enrollment. Students may also create independent study courses evaluated by faculty mentors.

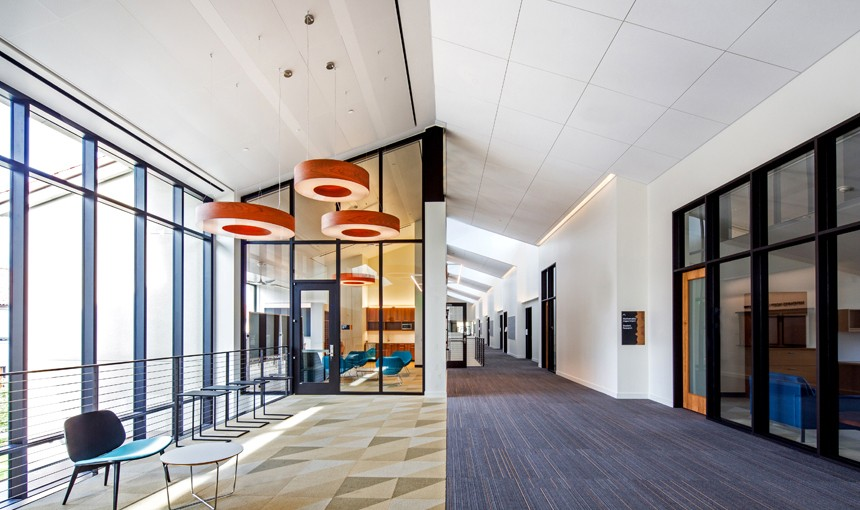
Estella Laboratory, opened in 2015, houses Pomona's physics, astronomy, and math programs.

All classes at Pomona are taught by professors (as opposed to teaching assistants). The average class size is 15; for the fall 2024 semester, 91% of traditional courses (Note: The definition of "traditional course" excludes thesis classes, lab sections, and independent study courses.) had under 30 students, and only four courses had 50 or more students. The college employed 264 faculty members as of the fall 2025 semester, approximately four-fifths of whom were full-time, resulting in a 7∶1 ratio of students to full-time equivalent professors. Among full-time faculty, 38% were members of racial minority groups, 51% were women, and 96% had a doctorate or other terminal degree in their field. Students and professors often form close relationships, and the college provides faculty with free meals to encourage them to eat with students.

=== Research, study abroad, and professional development ===
More than half of Pomona students conduct research with faculty. The college sponsors an annual Summer Undergraduate Research Program (SURP), in which more than 200 students are paid a stipend of up to $5,600 to conduct research with professors or pursue independent research projects with professorial mentorship. The Pomona College Humanities Studio, established in 2018, supports research in the humanities. Pomona is home to the Pacific Basin Institute, a research institute that studies issues pertaining to the Pacific Rim. The Sontag Center for Collaborative Creativity, colloquially termed "the Hive", was established in 2015 to support creative learning.

Approximately half of Pomona students study abroad. As of 2024, the college offered 70 pre-approved programs in 38+ countries. Study-away programs are available for Washington, D.C., Silicon Valley, and the Marine Biological Laboratory in Massachusetts, and semester exchanges are offered at Colby College, Spelman College, and Swarthmore College.

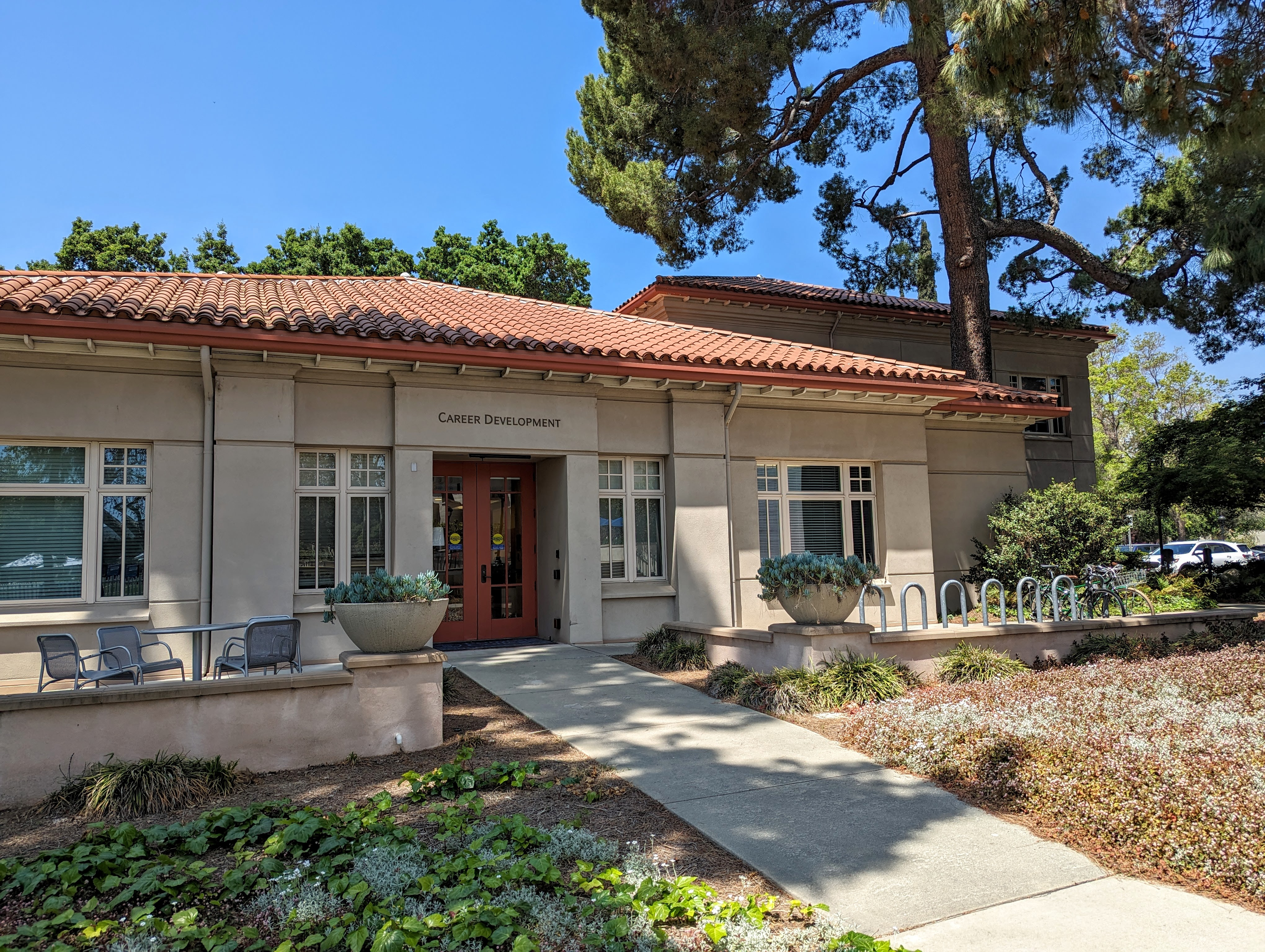
Pomona's Career Development Office is in Alexander Hall.

The Pomona College Career Development Office (CDO) provides students and alumni with career advising, networking, and other pre-professional opportunities. It runs the Pomona College Internship Program (PCIP), which provides stipends for completing unpaid or underpaid internships during the semester or summer; more than 250 students participate annually. The office connects students with alumni for networking and mentoring via the Sagehen Connect platform. During the 2015‍–‍2016 academic year, 175 employers hosted on-site informational events at the Claremont Colleges and 265 unique organizations were represented in 9 career fairs.

=== Outcomes ===
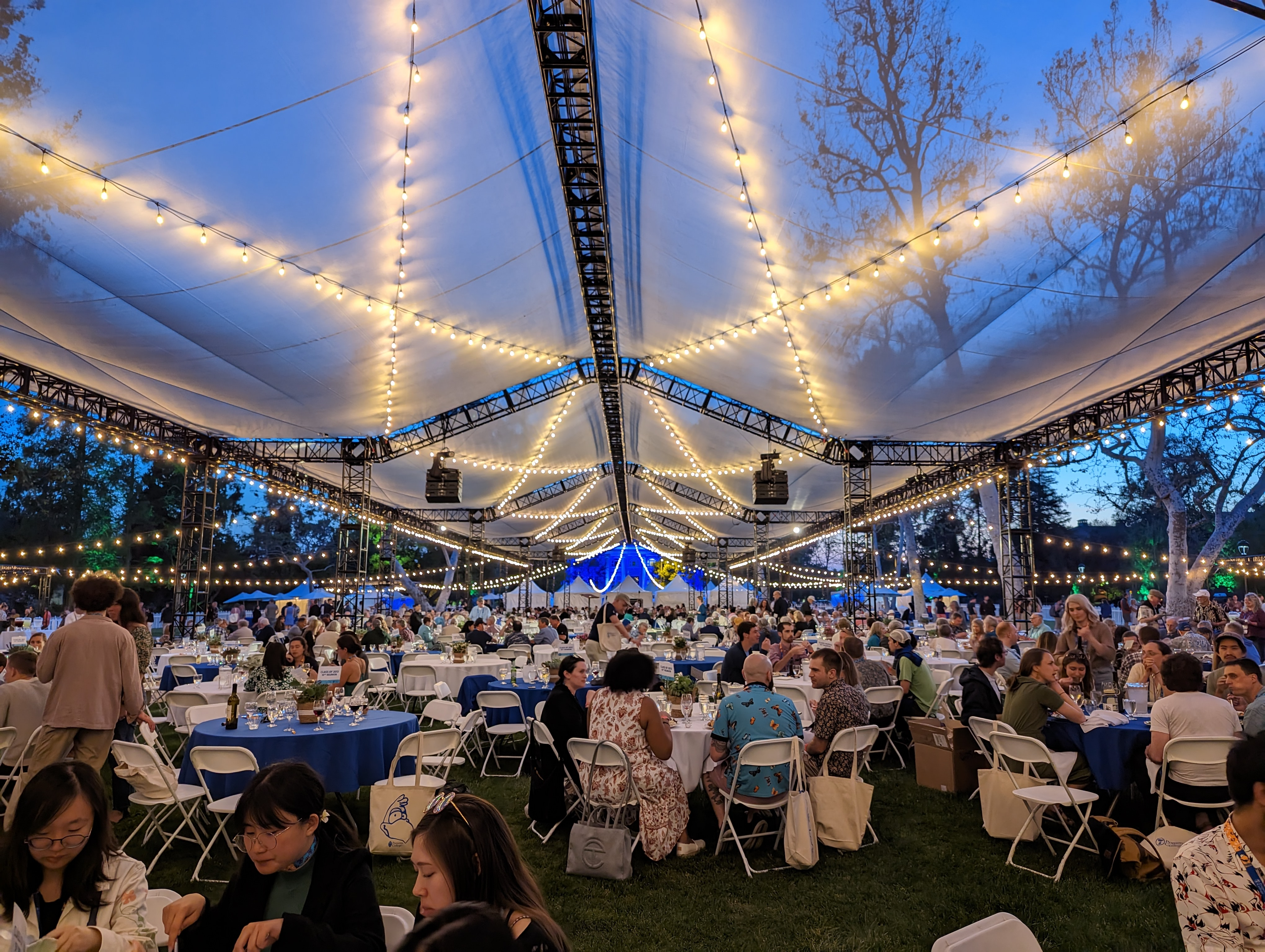
Dinner at a Pomona alumni weekend

For the 2024 entering class, 95% of students returned for their second year, giving Pomona one of the highest retention rates of any college or university in the U.S. For the 2019 entering class, 72% of students graduated within four years (among the highest rate of any U.S. college or university) and 92% graduated within six years.

Within 10 years, 81% of Pomona graduates attend graduate or professional school, according to a 2017 alumni survey. The college ranked 11th among all U.S. colleges and universities for doctorates awarded to alumni per capita, according to data collected by the National Science Foundation for 2013 to 2022. The top destinations between 2009 and 2018 (in order) were the University of California, Los Angeles; the University of California, Berkeley; Harvard University; the University of Southern California; and Stanford University. A 2025 analysis of the schools that send the most students per capita to the highest-ranked U.S. medical, business, and law schools placed Pomona 17th for medical schools, 22nd for business schools, and 14th for law schools.

The top industries for graduates are technology; education; consulting and professional services; finance; government, law, and politics; arts, entertainment, and media; healthcare and social services; nonprofits; and research. Pomona alumni earn a median early career salary of $73,700 and a median mid-career salary of $146,400, according to 2023 survey data from compensation analytics company PayScale.

Pomona ranks among the top producers of recipients of various competitive postgraduate fellowships, including the Churchill Scholarship, Fulbright Program, Goldwater Scholarship, Marshall Scholarship, National Science Foundation graduate research fellowship, and Rhodes Scholarship.

=== Reputation and rankings ===
Academic rankings

Liberal arts
- U.S. News & World Report: 5
- Washington Monthly: 10

National
- Forbes: 37
- WSJ/College Pulse: 25

Pomona is considered one of the top liberal arts colleges in the country. However, among the broader public, it has less name recognition than many larger schools.

The 2025 U.S. News & World Report Best Colleges Ranking places Pomona tied for fifth in the national liberal arts colleges category out of 211 colleges.

Pomona has rated similarly in other college rankings. In 2015, the Forbes ranking placed it first among all colleges and universities in the U.S., drawing media attention.

== People ==
=== Admissions ===
Admissions statistics
- 2024 entering class
- Admit rate: 7.0% ( −0.4)
- Yield rate: 50% (▼ −4)

Test scores middle 50%^{[i]}
- SAT EBRW: 740–770 (▲ +40 median)
- SAT Math: 750–790 (▲ +30 median)
- ACT Composite: 33–35 (▲ +1 median)

High school GPA^{[ii]}
- Top 10%: 90% (▼ −3)
- Top 25%: 99% (▼ −1)
- Top 50%: 100% ( no change)

Pomona offers three routes for students to apply: the Common Application, the QuestBridge application, and the Coalition Application. Applicants who want an earlier, binding decision can apply via early decision I or II; others apply through regular decision. Additionally, the college enrolls two 10-student Posse Foundation cohorts, from Chicago and Miami, in each class.

Pomona considers various factors in its admissions process, placing greatest importance on course rigor, class rank, GPA, application essays, recommendations, extracurricular activities, talent, and character. Test scores, first generation status, geographic residence, volunteer work, and work experience are considered. Alumni relationships, religious affiliation, and level of interest are not considered. Admission is need-blind for students who are U.S. citizens, permanent residents, DACA recipients, undocumented, or graduates of a U.S. high school, and need-aware for international students. The college is part of many coalitions and initiatives targeted at recruiting underrepresented demographics.

The college admitted 7.1% of applicants for the 2025 entering class, 47.3% of whom chose to enroll. The number of transfer applicants admitted has varied by year; in 2024, Pomona admitted 44 of 509 applicants (8.6%).

Historical enrollment

Year	Enr.	±%
1890	17	—
1900	100	+488.2%
1910	337	+237.0%
1920	708	+110.1%
1930	830	+17.2%
1940	841	+1.3%
1950	1,070	+27.2%

Year	Enr.	±%
1960	1,089	+1.8%
1970	1,295	+18.9%
1980	1,411	+9.0%
1990	1,487	+5.4%
2000	1,547	+4.0%
2010	1,538	−0.6%
2020	1,477	−4.0%

=== Student body ===
Race and ethnicity of students (spring 2026 semester)^{†}
1. White (27.5%)
2. Asian (18.7%)
3. Hispanic (19.1%)
4. Black (9.10%)
5. Pacific Islander (0.30%)
6. Native American (0.10%)
7. Multiracial (8.90%)
8. International (12.5%)
9. Unknown (3.70%)
^{†} "Hispanic" includes Hispanics of any race. All other categories refer to non-Hispanics.

As of the fall 2026 semester, Pomona's student body consists of 1,685 degree-seeking undergraduate students and a token number of non–degree seeking students. Compared to its closest liberal arts peers, Pomona has been characterized as laid back, academically oriented, mildly quirky, and politically liberal.

The student body is roughly evenly split between men and women, and 91% of students are under 22 years old. Pomona is one of the most racially and ethnically diverse colleges in the U.S. The geographic origins of the student body are also diverse, with all 50 U.S. states, the major U.S. territories, and more than 60 foreign countries represented. Students from California make up 31%, with sizable concentrations from the other western states. The median family income of students was $166,500 as of 2013, with 52% of students coming from the top 10% highest-earning families and 22% from the bottom 60%. The college has been increasing its enrollment of low-income students since the early 2000s, and was ranked second among all private institutions and eighth among all institutions in The New York Times' 2017 College Access Index, a measure of economic diversity. Various religious and spiritual beliefs are represented among students, with many leaning secular.

Among students in the 2024 entering class who submitted test scores, the middle 50% scored 740‍–‍770 on the SAT evidence-based reading and writing section, 750‍–‍790 on the SAT math section, and 33‍–‍35 on the ACT. Among students with an official high school class rank, 90% ranked in the top tenth and 99% ranked in the top quarter.

=== Noted alumni and faculty ===
Alumni
Name	Class	Notability	Ref.
David P. Barrows	1894	Anthropologist, educator	
Chen Hansheng	1920	Chinese social scientist	
Joel McCrea	1928	Westerns film actor	
John Cage	1932^{‡}	Avant-garde composer	
Robert Taylor	1933	Film actor	
Alan Cranston	1936^{‡}	U.S. senator (D‑CA)	
James H. Howard	1937	World War II ace pilot	
Robert Shaw	1938	Choir conductor	
Art Clokey	1943^{‡}	Stop motion animator	
Roy E. Disney	1951	Disney executive	
Richard Chamberlain	1956	Film actor, singer	
Robert Towne	1956	New Hollywood screenwriter	
Kris Kristofferson	1958	Outlaw country singer	
James Turrell	1965	Light and Space artist	
Myrlie Evers‑Williams	1968	Civil rights activist	
Bill Keller	1970	The New York Times editor	
Marianne Williamson	1974^{‡}	Self-help author, activist	
Jennifer Doudna	1985	Biochemist, Nobel laureate	
Brian Schatz	1994	U.S. senator (D‑HI)	
^{‡} Did not graduate from Pomona

Faculty
Name	Active tenure	Notability	Ref.
Leonard Pronko	1957–2014	Kabuki scholar	
Michael Armacost	1960s	U.S. ambassador	
Stanley Crouch	c. 1969 – c. 1975	Cultural critic	
Bobby Bradford	1974–2021	Jazz musician	
Frank Gibney	c. 1979 – c. 2006	Journalist	
Gregg Popovich	1979–1988	Basketball coach	
Samuel H. Yamashita	1983–present	Historian	
David Foster Wallace	2002–2008	Essayist, novelist	
Claudia Rankine	2006–2015	Poet	
Jonathan Lethem	2011–present	Novelist	
Cameron Munter	2013–2015	U.S. ambassador	

== Student life ==
=== Residential life ===
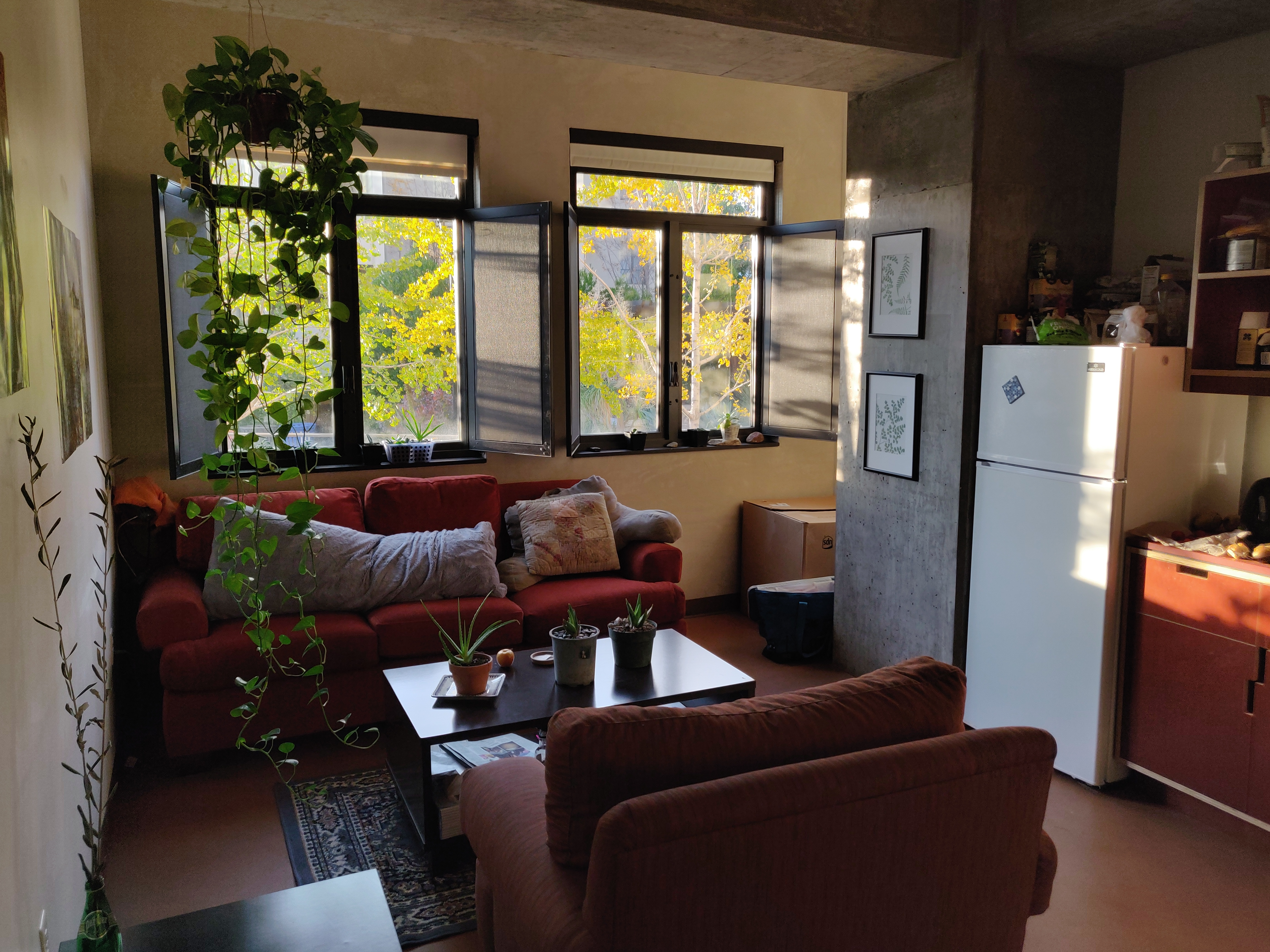
Common room in a Dialynas Hall suite (view as a 360° interactive panorama)

Pomona is a residential campus, and nearly all students live on campus for all four years in one of the college's sixteen residence halls. All first-year students live on South Campus, and most third- and fourth-year students live on North Campus. Housing is offered in various configurations, including singles, one-room or two-room doubles, and "friendship suites" consisting of a cluster of rooms, often around a central common area. All incoming students are placed into a sponsor group, with ten to twenty peers and two or three upper-class "sponsors" tasked with easing the transition to college life but not enforcing rules (a duty given to resident advisors). Sponsor groups often share activities such as "fountaining", a tradition in which students are thrown into a campus fountain on their birthday. The program dates back to 1927 for women and was expanded in 1950 to include men.

Pomona's social scene is intertwined with that of the other 5Cs, with many activities and events shared between the colleges. The college's alcohol policies are aimed at encouraging responsible consumption and include a strict ban of hard liquor on South Campus. Dedicated substance-free housing is also offered. Overall, drinking culture is present but does not dominate over other elements of campus life, nor does athletics culture. Violations of the student code are typically handled by the student-run Judicial Council, known as "J-Board".

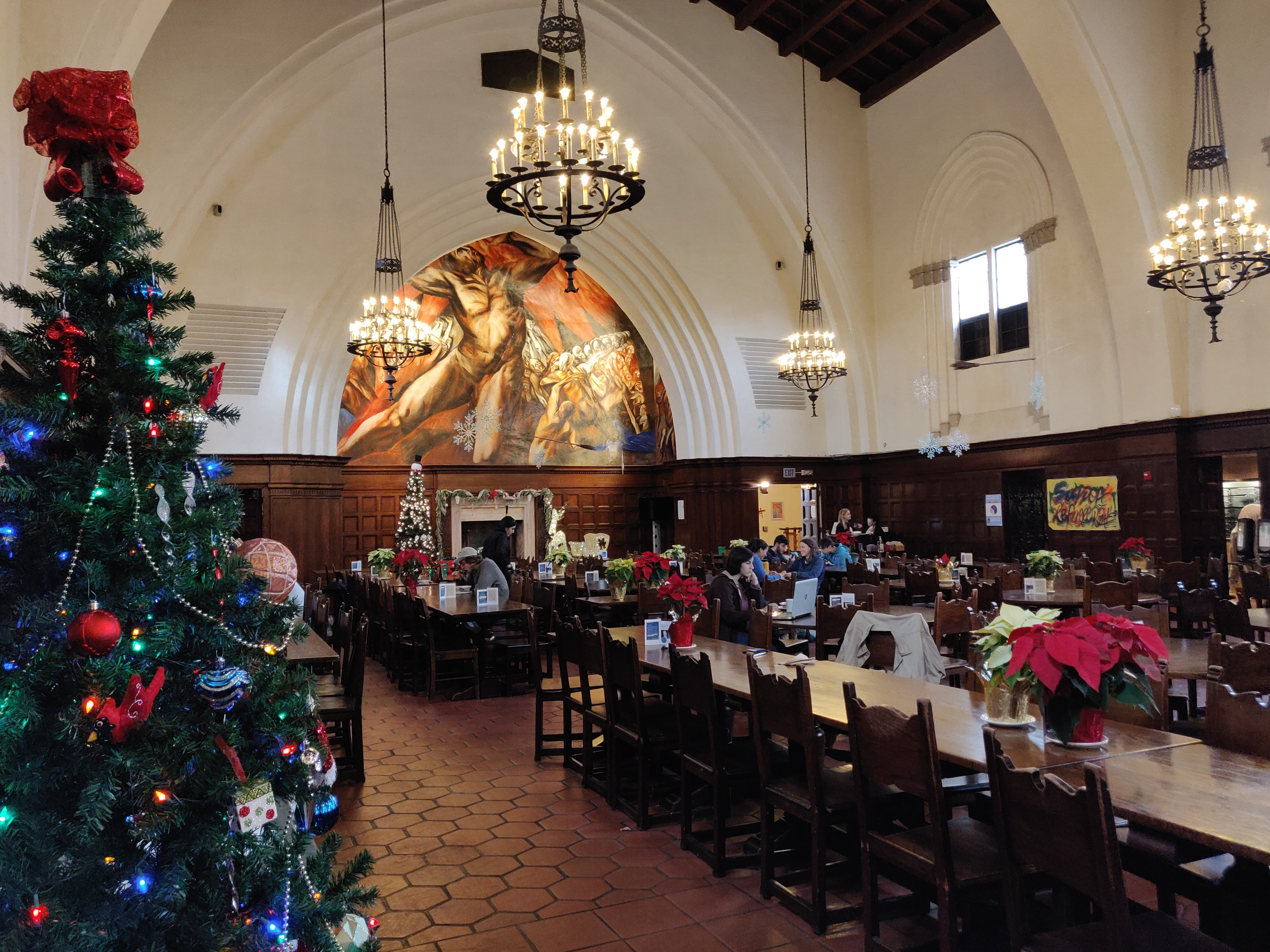
Frary Dining Hall on North Campus is the largest of Pomona's three dining halls. (view as a 360° interactive panorama)

Pomona's dining services are run in house. All on-campus students are required to have a meal plan, which can be used at any of the Claremont Colleges' seven buffet-style dining halls. (Note: Meal plan credits can also be used for takeout meals or at Claremont McKenna's Athenaeum.) The menus emphasize sustainable and healthy options, and the food quality is generally praised. Every night Sunday through Wednesday, Frary Dining Hall opens for a late-night snack. Meal plans also include "Flex Dollars" usable at the various campus eateries, including the Coop Fountain, Coop Store, and sit-down Café 47 in the SCC.

=== Campus organizations ===
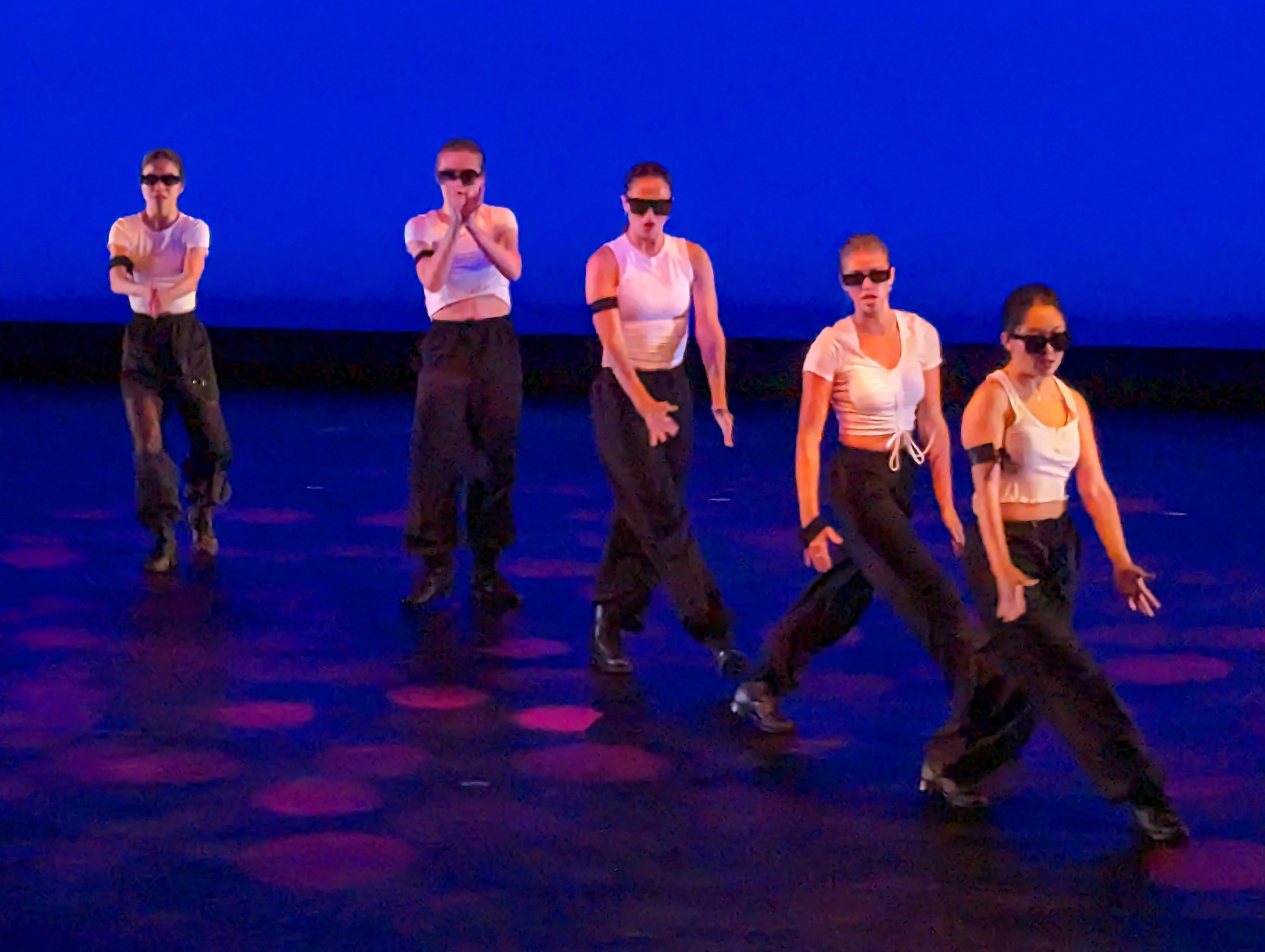
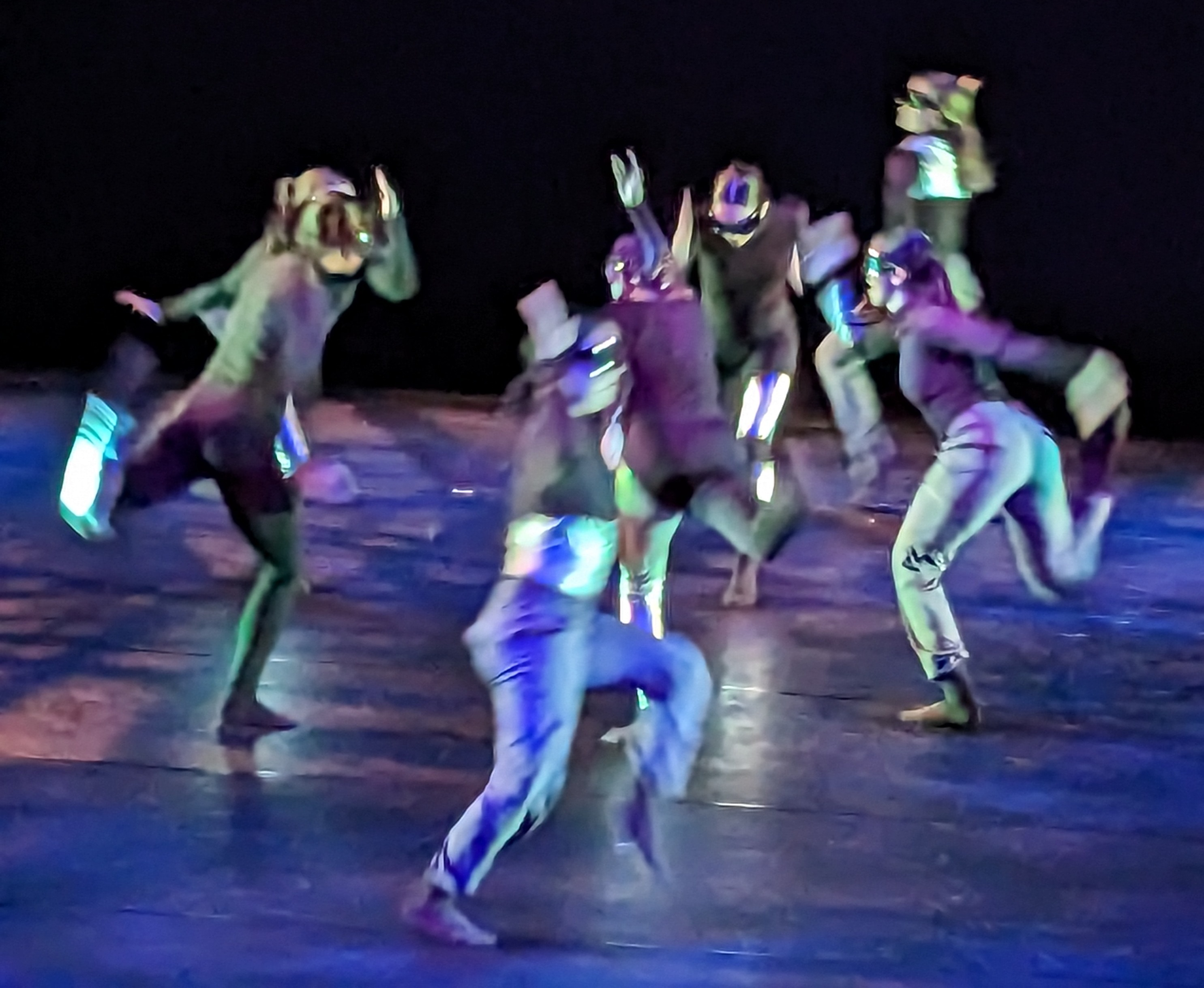
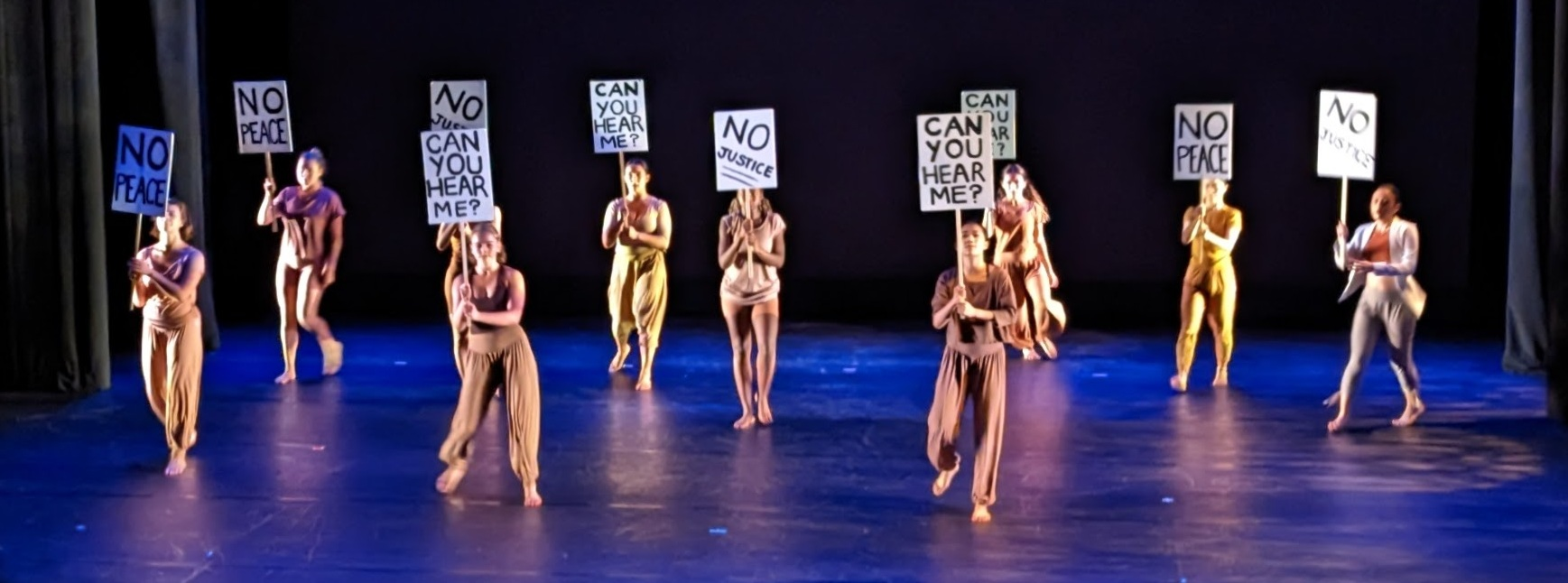
Scenes from a Pomona spring dance concert

Some extracurricular organizations at Pomona are specific to the college, whereas others are open to students at all of the Claremont Colleges. In total, there are nearly 300 clubs and organizations across the 5Cs.

The Associated Students of Pomona College (ASPC) is Pomona's official student government. Composed of elected representatives and appointed committee members, ASPC distributes funding for clubs and organizations, represents the student body in discussions with the administration, runs student programming (such as the Yule Ball dance and Ski-Beach Day) through the Pomona Events Committee (PEC), and provides various student services such as an airport rideshare program.

There are several media organizations at the Claremont Colleges, the largest of which is The Student Life, the oldest college newspaper in Southern California. It publishes a weekly print edition as well as online content. Pomona also has a student-run radio station, KSPC. The Claremont Independent, a conservative magazine, has produced articles about the 5Cs' political culture that have been picked up by national conservative media outlets and drawn criticism from many students. The Golden Antlers publishes satirical content. Pomona's yearbook, Metate, was founded in 1894 and discontinued in 2012. The college's official magazine, Pomona College Magazine, is published three times per year by the communications office.

Pomona has numerous clubs or support offices which provide resources and mentoring programs for students with particular identities, including female, non-white, Asian, South Asian, Latino, black, indigenous, multi-ethnic or multi-racial, international, queer, religious, and undocumented or DACA recipient students. (Note: Acronyms and titles for these organizations include the WU, SOCA, AAMP and AARC, SAMP, CLSA, OBSA, IPMP, MERGE, ISMP, QRC, chaplains' office, and IDEAS.) The college's first-generation and low-income community, FLI Scholars, has more than 200 members. The Campus Advocates and EmPOWER Center support survivors of sexual violence and work to promote consent culture.

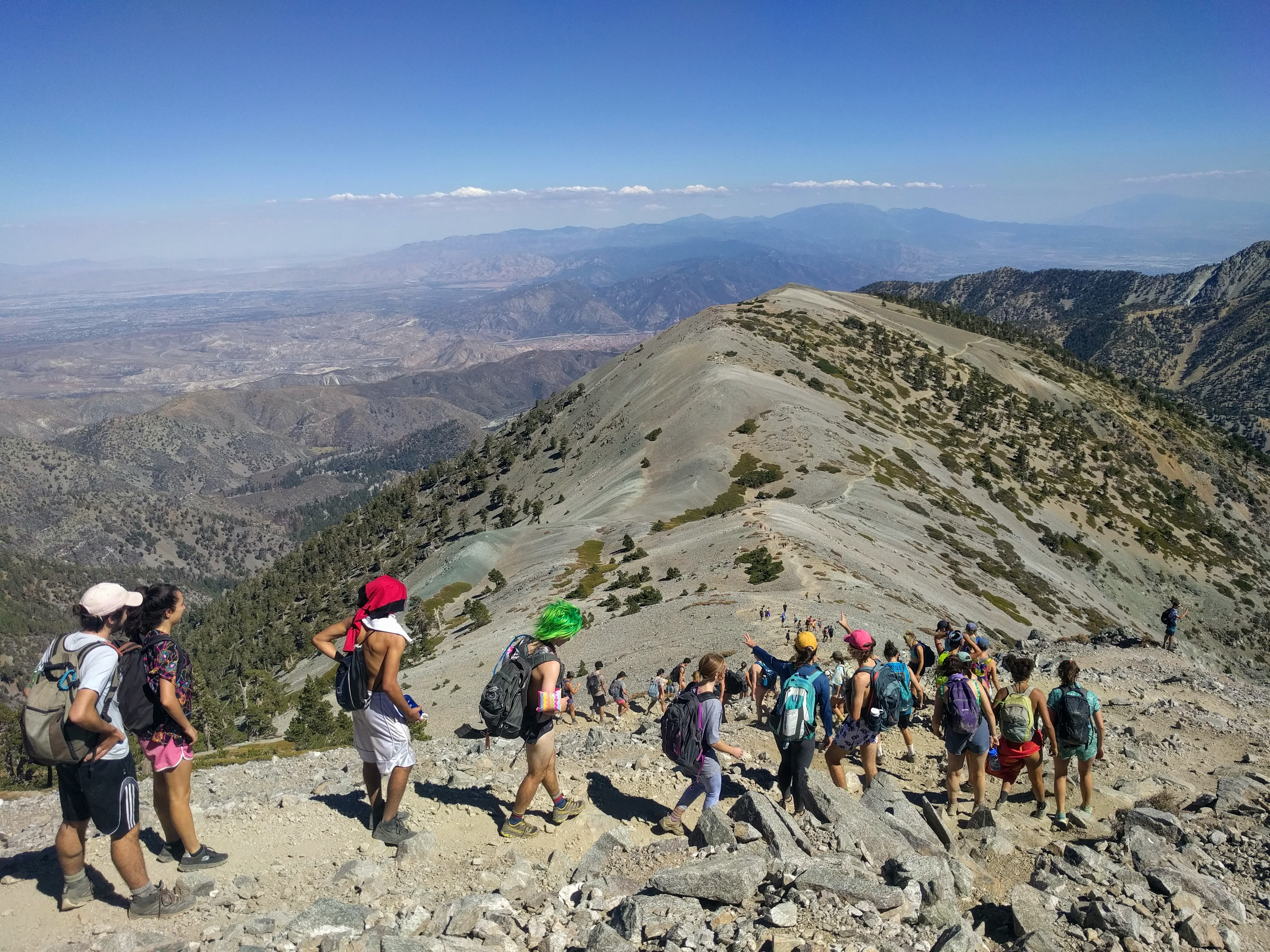
An On the Loose hike descends from the summit of Mount Baldy toward the Devil's Backbone ridge in the San Gabriel Mountains north of campus.

On the Loose (OTL), the outing club of the 5Cs, sponsors trips to outdoors destinations. Its flagship event, an annual hike up Mount Baldy in swimwear or goofy costumes, can draw more than 100 participants. It is affiliated with the Outdoor Education Center of Pomona College (OEC), which lends equipment to students for free and provides outdoor leadership training.

The Pomona Student Union (PSU) facilitates the discussion of political and social issues on campus by hosting discussions, panels, and debates with prominent speakers holding diverse viewpoints. Other speech and debate organizations include a mock trial team, model UN team, and debate union. Pomona's secret society, Mufti, is known for gluing small sheets of paper around campus with cryptic puns offering social commentary on campus happenings.

There are several dance groups on campus, including the Claremont Colleges Ballroom Dance Company (CCBDC), which has more than 130 dancers, making it the third-largest collegiate program in the U.S. It has won multiple national championships. The Pomona College Theater Department produces four mainstage productions and a dance concert each year, and there are several smaller student-run productions as well. The 5Cs have two improv groups, Without a Box and Underground Theatrical Institution (UTI).

Pomona's music department manages several ensembles, including an orchestra, band, choir, glee club, jazz ensemble, and Balinese gamelan ensemble. All students can receive free private music lessons. There are eight a cappella groups on campus. One, the Claremont Shades, hosts the annual SCAMFest concert, which draws singers from other Southern California colleges. Another, Midnight Echo, hosts the less extensive annual Human Symphony. The other six groups are the Ninth Street Hooligans, Blue & White, After School Specials, Earth Tones, Mood Swing, and One Night Stanza.

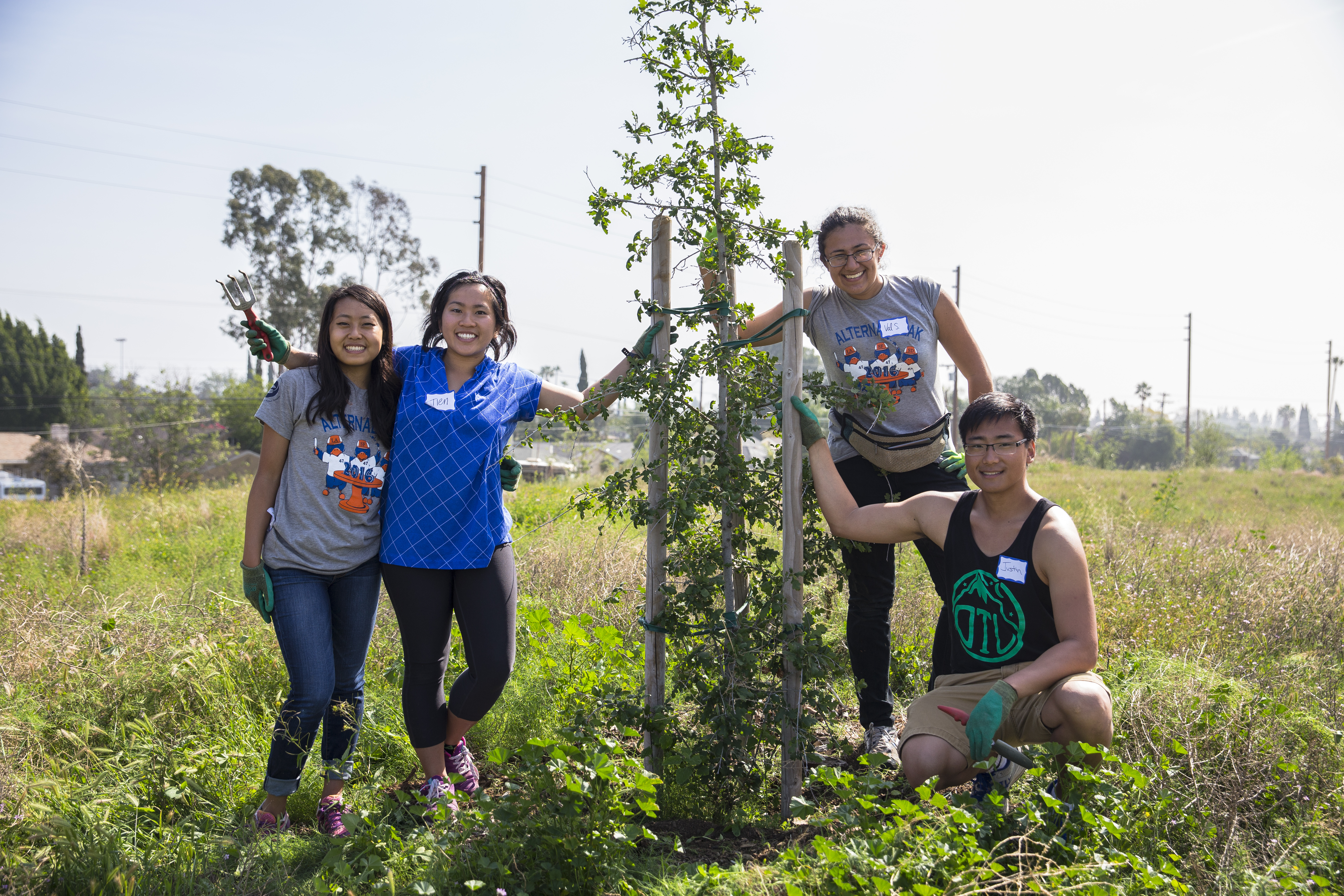
Students on Alternabreak, a week-long community engagement trip held over spring break, care for trees in a Los Angeles park.

The Draper Center for Community Partnerships, established in 2009, coordinates Pomona's various community engagement programs. These include mentoring for local youth communities, English tutoring for Pomona staff, and volunteering trips over spring break. It also operates the Pomona Academy for Youth Success (PAYS), a three-year pre-college summer program for local low-income and first-generation students of color.

Pomona has two remaining local Greek letter organizations, Sigma Tau and Kappa Delta, both of which are co-educational. Neither have special housing, and Greek life is not considered a major part of the social scene on campus the way it is at many other U.S. colleges.

=== Traditions ===
==== Forty-seven reverence ====
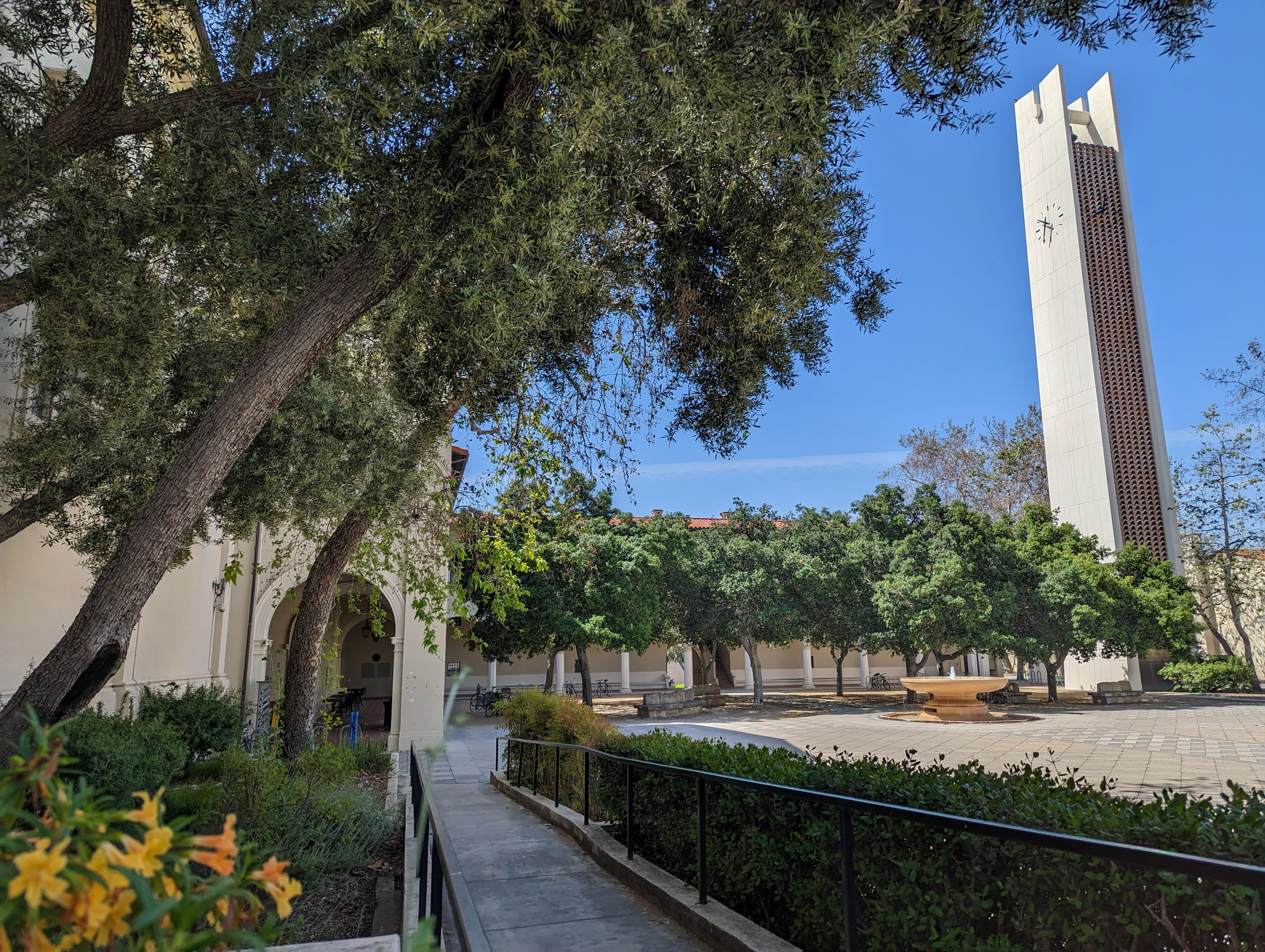
The Smith Clock Tower (right) has been set up to chime on the 47th minute of the hour.

The number 47 has historical implications to the college and has been incorporated into various aspects of campus life. The tradition began in the summer of 1964, when two students, Laurie Mets and Bruce Elgin, conducted a research project seeking to find out whether the number occurs more often in nature than would be expected by chance. They documented various 47 sightings, and professor Donald Bentley produced a false mathematical proof that 47 was equal to all other integers. The number became a meme among the class, which spread once the academic year began and snowballed over time.

Notable 47 sightings include the fact that Pomona is located off of exit 47 of Interstate 10, and the fact that the largest residential building on campus, Mudd-Blaisdell (formally Florence Carrier Blaisdell and Della Mullock Mudd Hall, a title with 47 characters), was completed in 1947 and contains a staircase with 47 balusters.

Many Pomona alumni have deliberately inserted references to 47 into their work. Joe Menosky (class of 1979), a writer for Star Trek: The Next Generation, inserted mentions of 47 into nearly every episode he wrote, a practice that has been picked up by other Star Trek writers. Pomona hosts a community service–oriented celebration every April 7 (abbreviated 4/7 in the U.S.). In the early 2010s, the college's clock tower was set up to chime on the 47th minute of the hour.

==== Other traditions ====
As part of Pomona's 10-day orientation, incoming students spend four days off campus completing an "Orientation Adventure" or "OA" trip. The OA program began in 1995, and is one of the oldest outdoor orientation programs in the U.S.

Every spring, the college hosts "Ski-Beach Day", in which students visit a ski resort in the morning and then head to the beach after lunch. The tradition dates back to an annual mountain picnic established in 1891.

Since the 1970s, Pomona has used a cinder block flood barrier along the northern edge of its campus, Walker Wall, as a free speech wall. First-year students also decorate the wall during orientation with other students in their sponsor group. Over the years, provocative postings on the wall have spawned numerous controversies.

=== Transportation ===
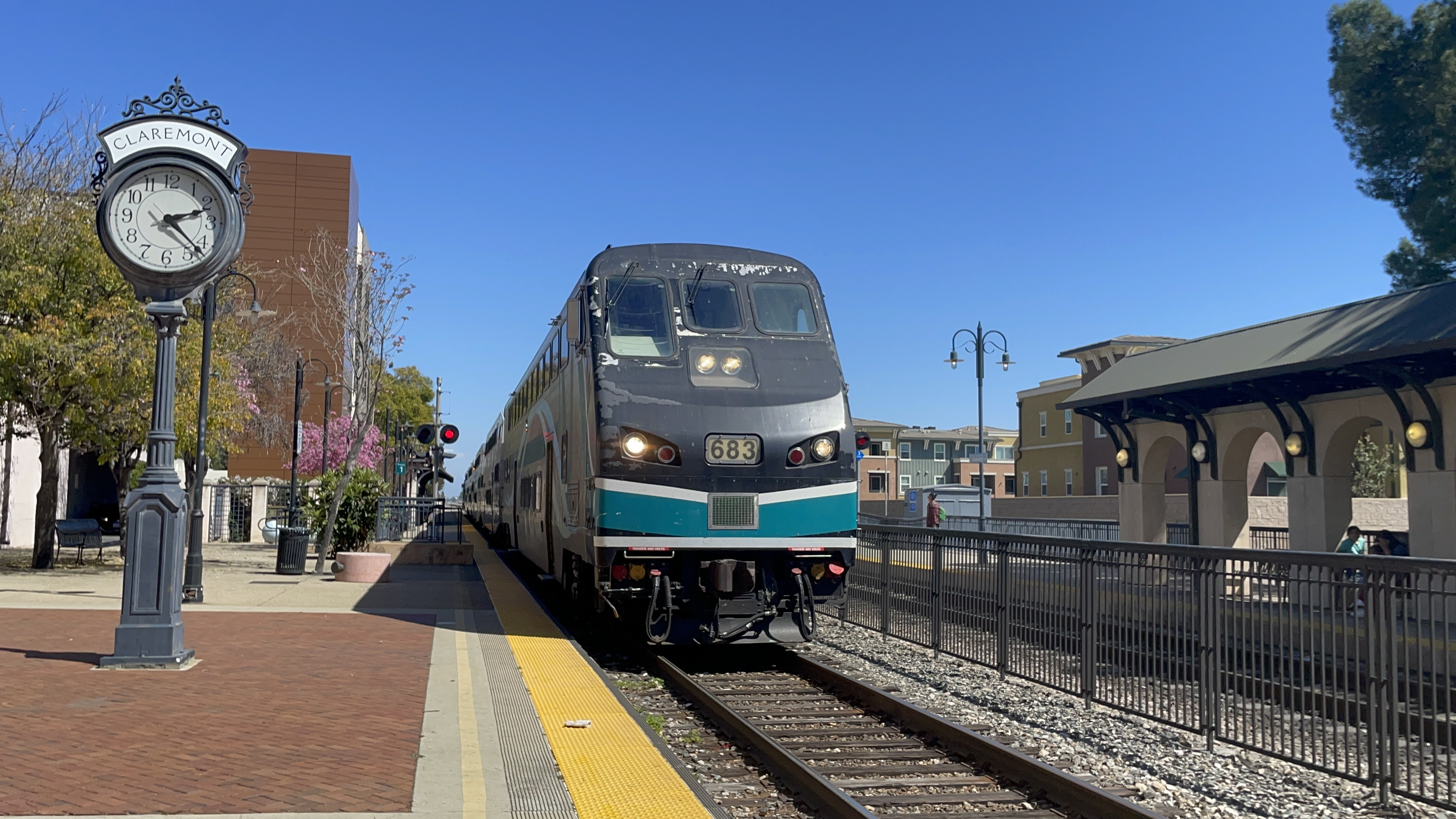
Claremont's train station is directly south of campus.

Pomona's campus is located immediately north of Claremont station, where the San Bernardino Line train (Metrolink) provides regular service to Los Angeles Union Station, the city's main transit hub. The Foothill Transit bus system connects to cities in the San Gabriel Valley and Pomona Valley.

Pomona's "Green Bikes" program maintains a fleet of more than 300 bicycles that are rented free to students each semester. Non-first-year students are allowed to park on campus after registering their vehicle. The college has several Zipcar vehicles on campus that may be rented and owns vehicles that can be checked out for club and extracurricular purposes. PEC and SCC off-campus events are usually served with the college's "Sagecoach" passenger bus.

=== Athletics ===
Varsity teams
Women's	Men's
Basketball	Baseball
Cross country	Basketball
Golf	Cross country
Lacrosse	Football
Soccer	Golf
Softball	Soccer
Swimming and diving	Swimming and diving
Tennis	Tennis
Track and field	Track and field
Volleyball	Water polo
Water polo	

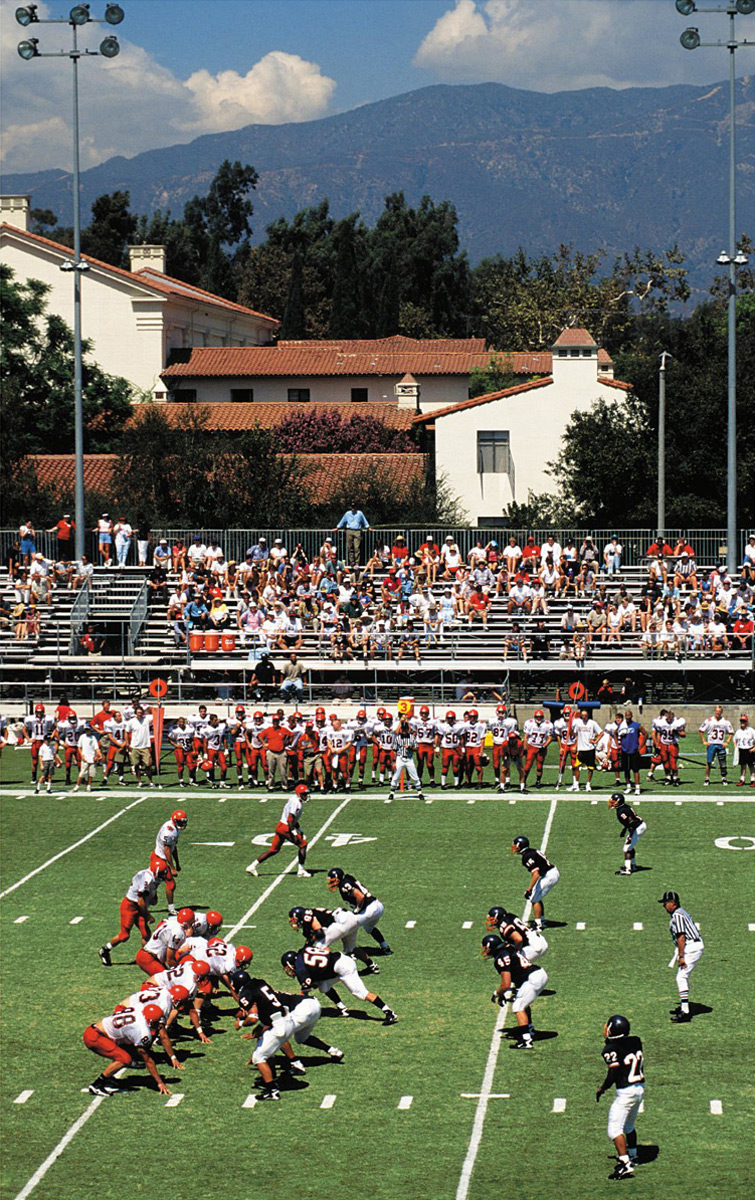
A Pomona-Pitzer football game

Pomona's varsity athletics teams compete jointly with Pitzer College as the Pomona-Pitzer Sagehens. The 11 women's and 10 men's teams participate in NCAA Division III in the Southern California Intercollegiate Athletic Conference (SCIAC). Pomona-Pitzer's mascot is Cecil the Sagehen, a greater sage-grouse, and its colors are blue and orange. Its main rival is the Claremont-Mudd-Scripps Stags and Athenas (CMS), the other sports combination of the Claremont Colleges. The Sagehens ranked 15th out of 323 competing Division III schools and 2nd among SCIAC schools in the 2024‍–‍2025 Division III NACDA Directors' Cup, which ranks athletics programs and awards points relative to their finish in NCAA championships.

Club and intramural sports are also offered in various areas, such as dodgeball, flag football, and surfing. The physical education department offers a variety of activity classes each semester, such as karate, playground games, geocaching, and social dance.

==== Athletics history ====
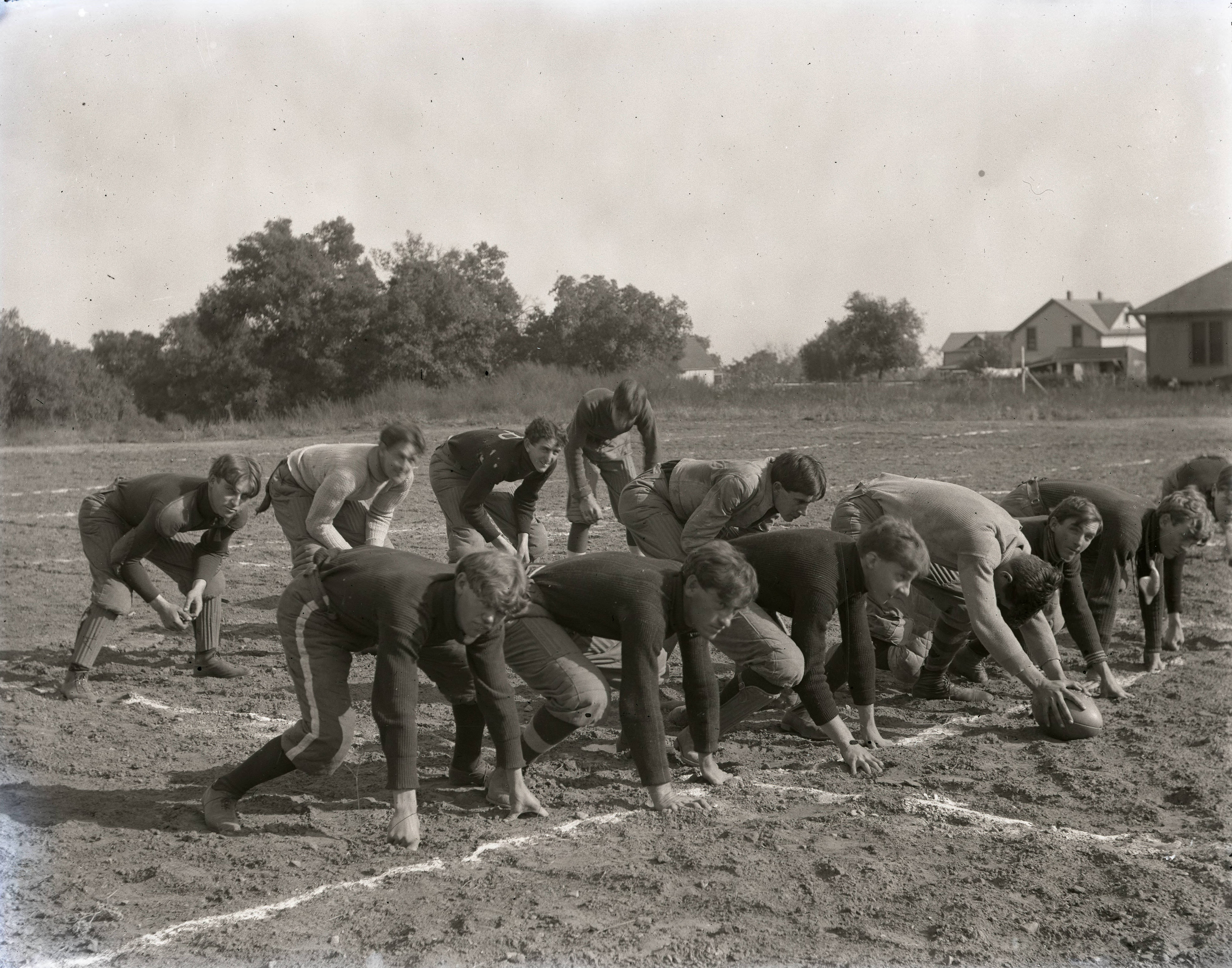
Members of the Pomona football team from the class of 1907

Pomona's first intercollegiate sports teams were formed in 1895. They competed under several names in the school's early years; the name "Sagehen" first appeared in 1913 and became the sole moniker in 1917. Pomona was one of the three founding members of the SCIAC in 1914. In 1946, it joined with Claremont Men's College (which would later be renamed Claremont McKenna College) to compete as Pomona-Claremont. The teams separated in 1956, and Pomona's athletics program operated independently until it joined with Pitzer College in 1970.

== Bibliography ==
- Bernard, Robert J. (1982). An Unfinished Dream: A Chronicle of the Group Plan of The Claremont Colleges. Claremont, California: Claremont University Center. OCLC 9199564.
- Brackett, Frank P. (1944). Granite and Sagebrush: Reminiscences of the First Fifty Years of Pomona College. Los Angeles: Ward Ritchie Press. hdl:2027/uc1.b3116079. OCLC 4334585.
- Edwards, G. Thomas (2008). Student Activism at Pomona, Willamette, and Whitman, 1965–1971 (PDF). Walla Walla, Washington: Whitman College and Northwest Archives. OCLC 228308410. Archived (PDF) from the original on October 19, 2021.
- Fiske, Edward B. (July 6, 2021). Fiske Guide to Colleges 2022 (38th ed.). Naperville, Illinois: Sourcebooks. pp. 146–147, 154–156. ISBN 978-1-4926-6498-7.
- Greene, Howard; Greene, Matthew (August 16, 2016). The Hidden Ivies (3rd ed.). New York: Collins Reference. pp. 549–564. ISBN 978-0-06-242090-9.
- Harth, Marjorie L. (2007). Pomona College: Reflections on a Campus. Claremont, California: Pomona College. ISBN 978-0-9786996-5-9.
- Lyon, E. Wilson (1977). The History of Pomona College, 1887–1969. Anaheim, California: The Castle Press. OCLC 4114776.
- McGrew, Rebecca; Phillips, Glenn, eds. (August 31, 2011). It Happened at Pomona: Art at the Edge of Los Angeles 1969–1973. Claremont, California: Pomona College Museum of Art. ISBN 978-0-9818955-8-1.
- Sumner, Charles Burt (1914). The Story of Pomona College. Boston: Pilgrim Press. OCLC 6071185.
- Yee, Vivian (July 1, 2014). "Pomona College". The Insider's Guide to the Colleges. By Yale Daily News staff (41st ed.). New York: St. Martin's Press. pp. 341–351. ISBN 978-1-4668-4835-1.
