= List of Pomona College people =

Notable alumni and staff of Pomona College

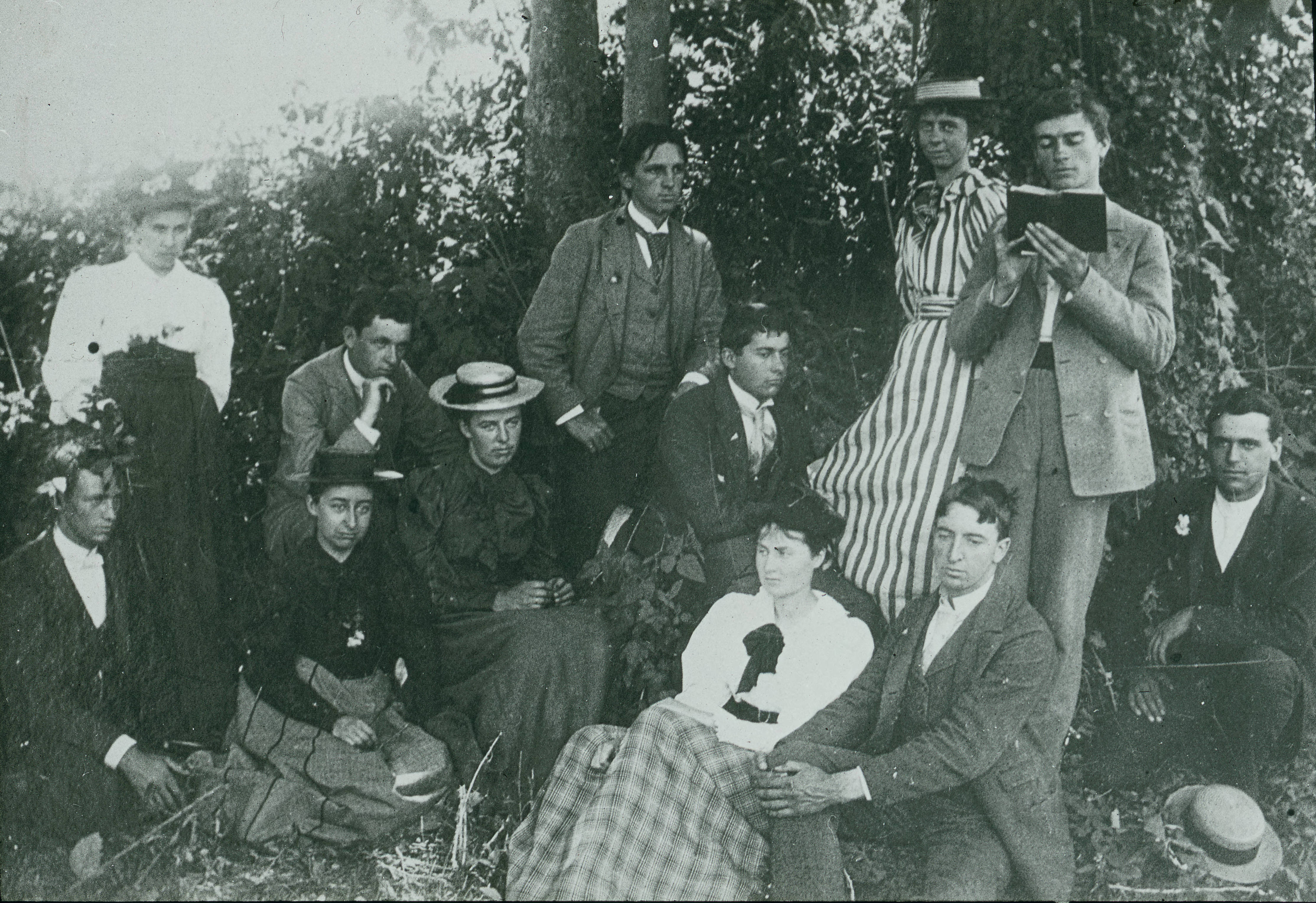
The class of 1894, Pomona's first graduating class, had 11 members.

Pomona College (/pəˈmoʊnə/ pə-MOH-nə) is a private liberal arts college in Claremont, California, and the founding member of the Claremont Colleges consortium. Many notable individuals have been affiliated with the college as graduates, non-graduating attendees, faculty, staff, or administrators.

Since its founding in 1887, Pomona has graduated 133 classes of students. The college enrolls approximately 1,690 students as of the fall 2025 semester and has roughly 25,000 living alumni. The top industries for graduates include technology; education; consulting and professional services; finance; government, law, and politics; arts, entertainment, and media; healthcare and social services; nonprofits; and research.

Pomona employs 276 faculty members as of the fall 2024 semester. The college has had 10 presidents, the first four of whom were Congregational ministers. The current president, G. Gabrielle Starr, took office in July 2017.

== Notable alumni ==
=== Arts and letters ===
==== Visual art ====
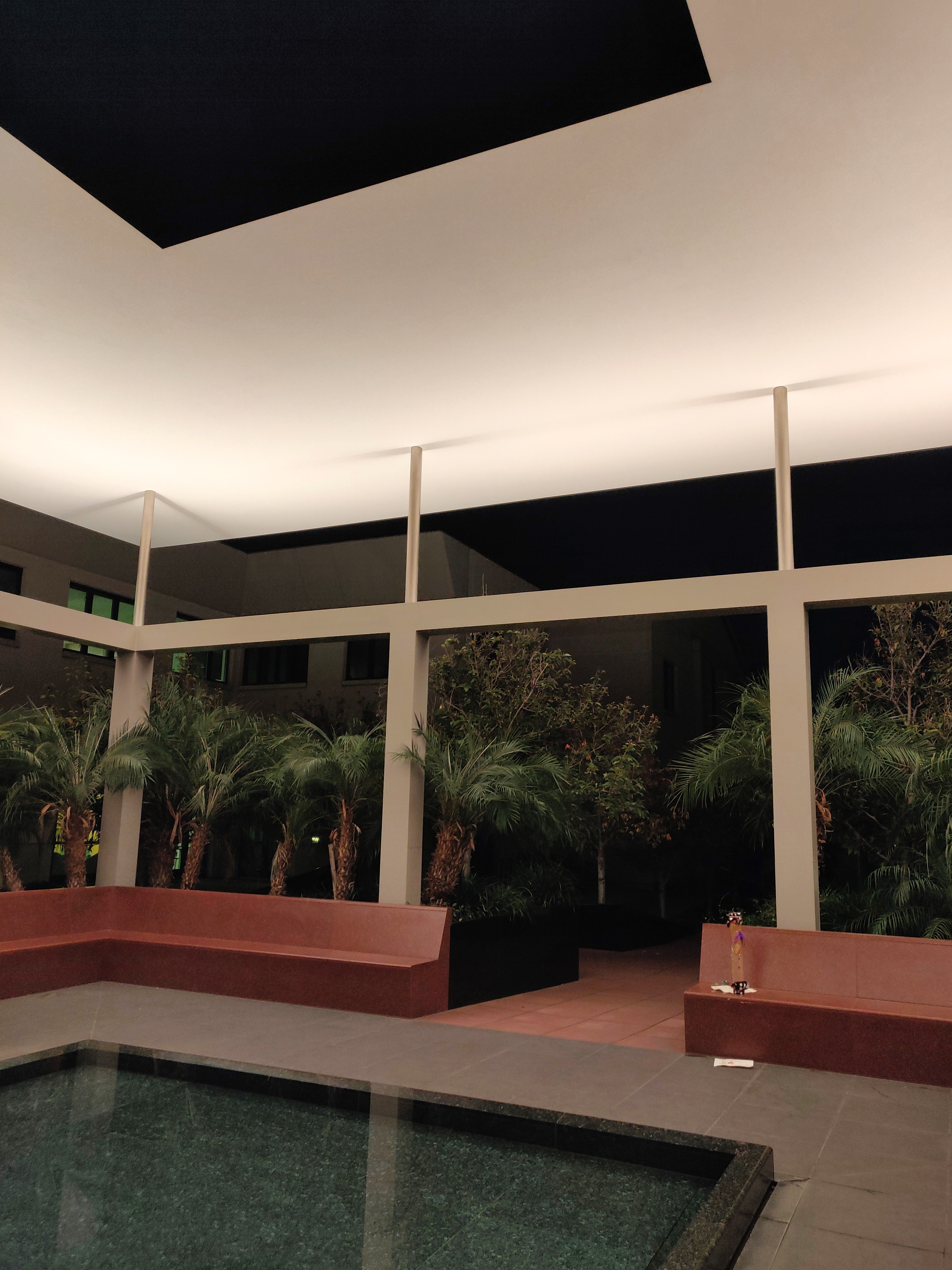
Dividing the Light, a 2007 skyspace on Pomona's campus by James Turrell, class of 1965

Name	Class year	Notability	Ref.
Milford Zornes	1934	California Scene Painting watercolor artist	
John Coleman Burroughs	1934	Illustrator	
Roger Edward Kuntz	1948	Landscape painter	
Marcia Hafif	1951	Artist, known for minimalist and process art works	
Barbara T. Smith	1953	Performance artist	
Gretta Bader	1956	Sculptor	
Helen Pashgian	1956	Light and Space artist	
Joan Brigham	1956	Artist, art historian, fellow of the Center for Advanced Visual Studies, known for steam sculpture	
James Strombotne	1956	Painter	
Mowry Baden	1958	Sculptor, known for kinaesthetic sculptures, Governor General's Award in Visual Art recipient, Guggenheim Fellowship recipient	
Michael Spafford	1959	Artist, professor emeritus at the School of Art, Art History, and Design University of Washington	
Mary GrandPré	1960s (Note: The specific year is not known.)	Illustrator, best known for her work on the U.S. editions of the Harry Potter books	
James Turrell	1965	Light and Space artist, known for skyspaces and Roden Crater land art project	
Judy Fiskin	1966	Photographer and video artist	
Chris Burden	1969	Performance, sculpture, and installation artist	
Bret Price	1972	Sculptor, educator	
Peter Shelton	1973	Sculptor	
Barry X Ball	1977	Sculptor	
Weston Teruya	1999	Asian-American visual artist and arts administrator, artist-in-residence at Recology, Asian Cultural Council Individual Fellowship, artist-in-residence at de Young Museum, Artadia Awards recipient	
Miko Lim	2002	Director and photographer	
Kameelah Janan Rasheed	2006	Writer, educator, and artist, Guggenheim Fellowship recipient, Creative Capital recipient	
Kim Ye	2007	Chinese-American multidisciplinary artist	
Gray Wielebinski	2014	Multidisciplinary artist	

==== Film and television ====
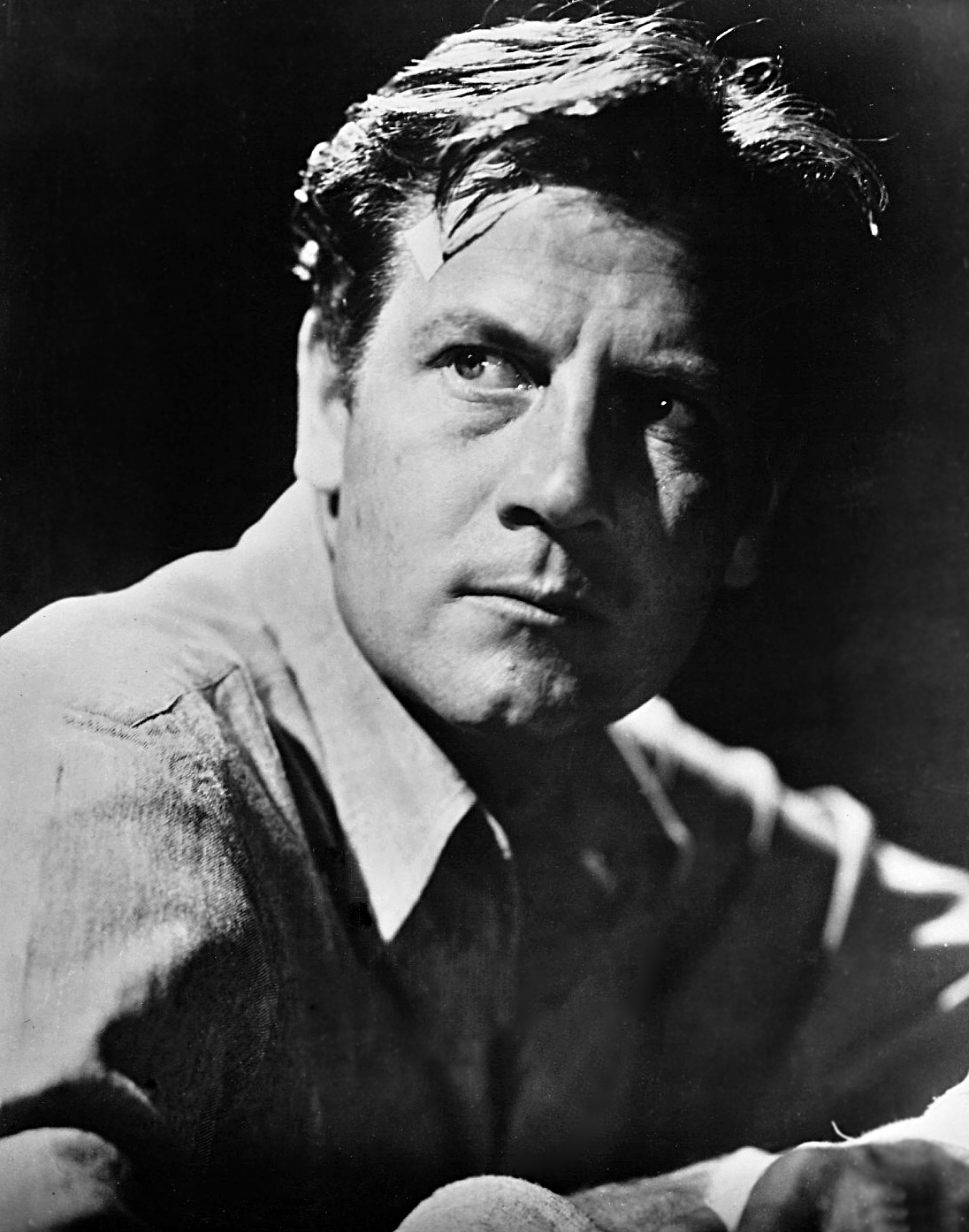
Joel McCrea, class of 1928, appeared in more than 100 films, including many Westerns.

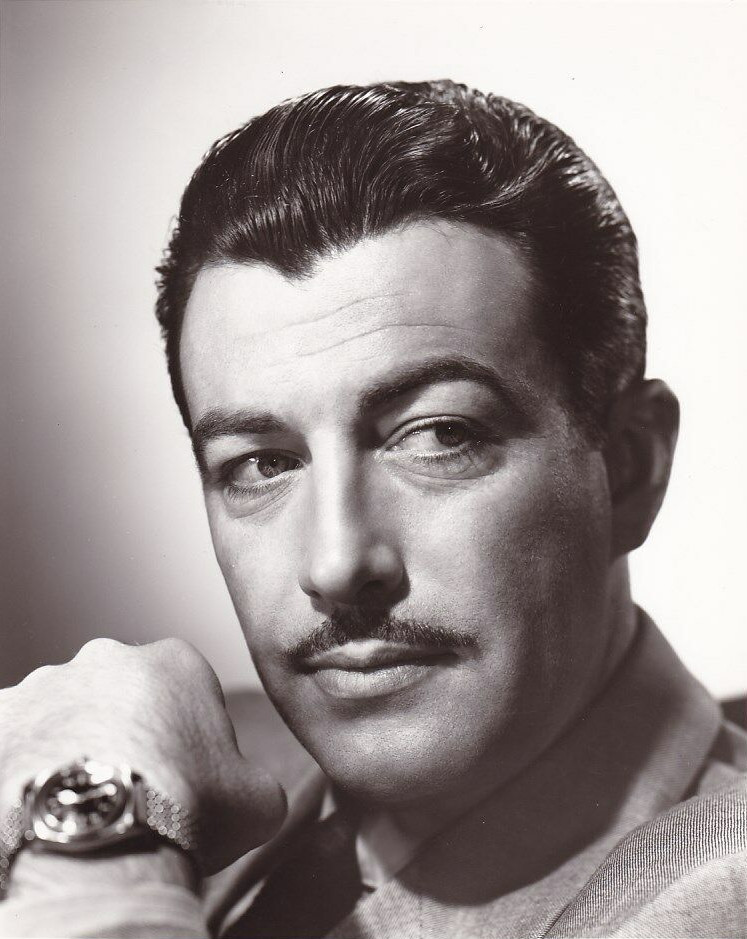
Robert Taylor, class of 1933, was one of the leading men of the Hollywood Golden Age.

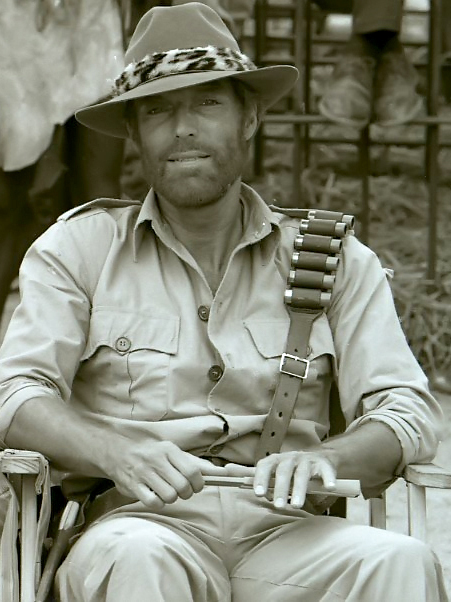
Richard Chamberlain, class of 1956, became a teen idol for his starring role in Dr. Kildare.

Name	Class year	Notability	Ref.
Joel McCrea	1928	Film actor (Sullivan's Travels, Foreign Correspondent)	
John Whitney	1930s	Early computer animation filmmaker	
Robert Taylor	1933	Film actor (Quo Vadis, Ivanhoe)	
Art Clokey	Attended 1939–1943	Stop-motion clay animator and creator of Gumby	
Amanda Blake	Attended c. 1950	Actress (Gunsmoke)	
Richard Chamberlain	1956	Film and theatre actor (Dr. Kildare, Shōgun, The Thorn Birds), three-time Golden Globe winner	
Robert Towne	1956	Academy Award–winning screenwriter (Chinatown; nominated for The Last Detail and Shampoo)	
Anthony Zerbe	1958	Emmy-winning character actor (Will Penny, The Omega Man, Licence to Kill)	
David S. Ward	1967	Film director (Major League) and Academy Award–winning screenwriter (The Sting)	
Robert Blalack	1970	Visual effects artist (won Academy Award for Star Wars and an Emmy for The Day After)	
Scott Paulin	1971	Actor (The Right Stuff), husband of actress Wendy Phillips	
Lynda Obst	1972	Film and television producer	
George C. Wolfe	1976	Two-time Tony Award–winning play director, playwright and film director (Nights in Rodanthe)	
Allison Jones	1977	Emmy Award–winning casting director	
Rosalind Chao	1978	Actress (The Joy Luck Club, Star Trek: The Next Generation)	
Ted Field	1979	Media mogul and film producer	
Joe Menosky	1979	Television writer (Star Trek franchise)	
Melissa Jo Peltier	1983	Television writer and producer (Dog Whisperer with Cesar Millan)	
Jim Taylor	1984	Academy Award–winning screenwriter (Sideways); frequent writing partner of Alexander Payne	
Viveca Paulin	1991	Actor, wife of comedian Will Ferrell	
Kelly Perine	1991	Television actor	
John Stephens	1996	Television producer, director, screenwriter, author of Emerald Atlas and The Books of Beginning children's novel series	
Jennifer Phang	1996	Filmmaker	
Sylvain White	1998	Film director (Stomp the Yard)	
Nava Mau	2014	Emmy-nominated actress (Baby Reindeer)	

==== Music ====
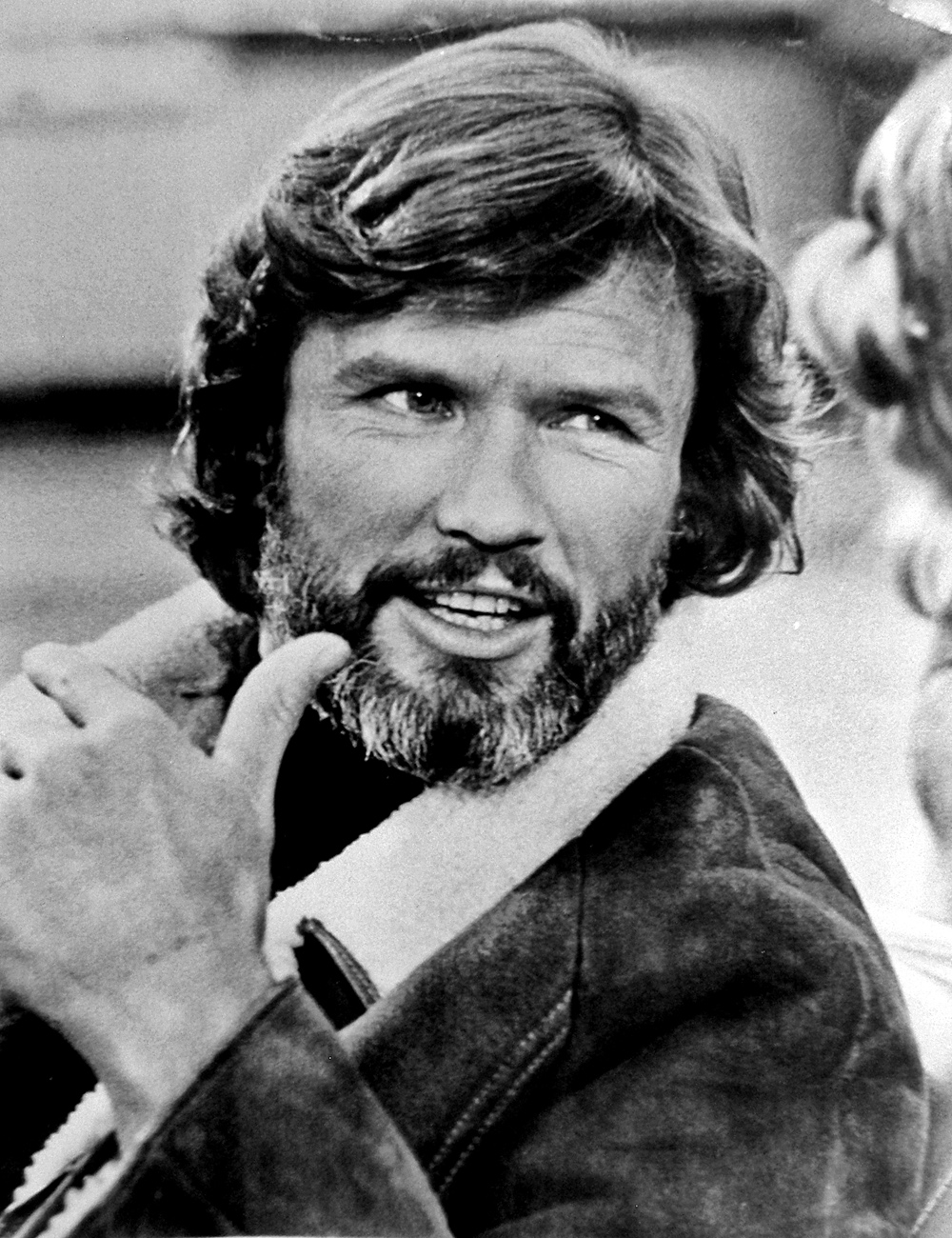
Actor and musician Kris Kristofferson, class of 1958

Name	Class year	Notability	Ref.
John Cage	Attended 1928–1930	Avant-garde composer, musician, and poet	
Vladimir Ussachevsky	1935	Composer of electronic music	
Robert Shaw	1938	Fourteen-time Grammy-winning conductor	
Chris Strachwitz	Transferred 1952	Grammy-winning record label executive and producer	
Tinius Nagell-Erichsen	1955	Norwegian publisher and chairman of Schibsted	
Kris Kristofferson	1958	Writer, singer-songwriter, actor, and musician	
Douglas Leedy	1959	Composer and music scholar	
Frank Zappa	Auditor, c. 1959	Prolific musician, member of the Rock and Roll Hall of Fame	
Lucy Shelton	1965	Soprano	
David Noon	1968	Composer	
David Murray	1977	Jazz musician	
Frank Albinder	1980	Conductor, former director of Chanticleer	
Eric Friedl	1988	Musician, The Oblivians; owner of Goner Records	
Christine Fan	Attended 1990s	American-born Taiwanese singer and actress	
Chris Cain	1999	Musician, We Are Scientists	
Keith Murray	2000	Musician, We Are Scientists	
Tunji Balogun	2004	Record label executive, CEO of Def Jam Recordings and co-founder of Keep Cool Records	

==== Journalism and non-fiction writing ====
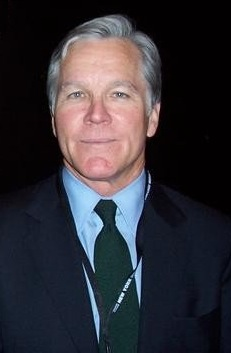
Bill Keller, class of 1970, won a Pulitzer for his reporting from the Soviet Union in the final years of the Cold War and served as executive editor of The New York Times from 2003 to 2011.

Name	Class year	Notability	Ref.
Relman Morin	1929	Two-time Pulitzer Prize–winning journalist for the Associated Press	
Mark Gayn	1933	Foreign affairs correspondent for the Toronto Star	
Paul Fussell	1947	Cultural and literary historian, known for criticism of the romanticization of war	
H. Arnold Barton	1953	Historian of Scandinavian history	
Terry Drinkwater	1958	CBS News correspondent	
Doug McConnell	1967	Television journalist	
Bill Keller	1970	Executive editor of The New York Times and winner of the 1989 Pulitzer Prize for International Reporting	
Verlyn Klinkenborg	1974	Author, editor, and academic, known for his writings on rural America	
Joe Palca	1974	NPR science correspondent	
Mary Schmich	1975	Columnist for the Chicago Tribune and winner of the 2012 Pulitzer Prize for Commentary	
Lynn Walford	1979	Automotive technology writer	
Richard Pérez‑Peña	1984	Reporter for The New York Times	
Zafar Sobhan	1992	Bangladeshi journalist and editor of the Dhaka Tribune	
Judd Legum	2000	Journalist, lawyer, and political staffer; founder of ThinkProgress	
Ashlee Vance	2000	Technology and business journalist, author	
Conor Friedersdorf	2002	Staff writer for The Atlantic, known for civil libertarian perspectives	
Joel Fagliano	2014	Mini crossword creator and editor for The New York Times	

==== Writing ====
Name	Class year	Notability	Ref.
Richard Armour	1927	Author, humorist, professor	
Mary Custis Vezey	1927	Poet and translator	
Betty Fussell	1949	Writer, critic, educator	
Ifeanyi Menkiti	1964	Nigerian poet, professor of philosophy at Wellesley College, owner of the Grolier Poetry Book Shop	
Robert Daseler	1967	Playwright and poet, recipient of the Richard Wilbur Award	
Ved Mehta	1956	Indian writer	
William Irwin Thompson	1962	Poet, cultural historian, cultural critic	
Blanche McCrary Boyd	1967	Author, professor of English and writer-in-residence at Connecticut College, recipient of the Guggenheim Fellowship and Lambda Literary Award	
Ray Young Bear	Attended 1969–1972	Poet and novelist, known for work on contemporary Native American identity	
Carol Fisher Sorgenfrei	1970	Playwright and professor emerita at University of California, Los Angeles	
Garrett Hongo	1973	Japanese-American poet	
Louis Menand	1973	Writer, The Metaphysical Club (which won the 2002 Pulitzer Prize for History)	
Brenda Hillman	1973	Poet, National Endowment for the Arts fellow, Guggenheim Fellow, Pushcart Prize winner, and Los Angeles Times Book Prize winner	
Bruce Bond	1975	Poet, Regents Professor Emeritus at the University of North Texas	
Richard Preston	1976	Writer for The New Yorker and bestselling author of The Hot Zone	
Douglas Preston	1978	Writer for The New Yorker and Smithsonian, bestselling thriller author	
Vikram Chandra	1984	Indian-American writer	
Aaron Becker	1996	Children's book writer and illustrator, Caldecott Honor recipient	
Ann Fisher-Wirth	1968	Poet, president of the Association for the Study of Literature and Environment, professor of English at the University of Mississippi	
Soma Mei Sheng Frazier	1995	American Writer, Associate Professor at State University of New York at Oswego	
Rebecca Curtis	1996	Writer, lecturer in creative writing at Columbia University, Rona Jaffe Foundation Writers' Award recipient	
Michelle Moran	2002	Historical fiction novelist	
Mac Barnett	2004	National Ambassador for Young People's Literature, Caldecott Honor recipient	
Jonathan Singer	2006	Progressive blogger	
Bennett Sims	2008	Fiction writer, Truman Capote Literary Trust fellow, associate professor at the University of Iowa	
Liz Fosslien	2009	Author, illustrator, and expert in workplace culture and emotions	
Julius Taranto	2012	Writer and lawyer	
Tom Lin	2018	Carnegie Medal–winning author	

==== Other ====
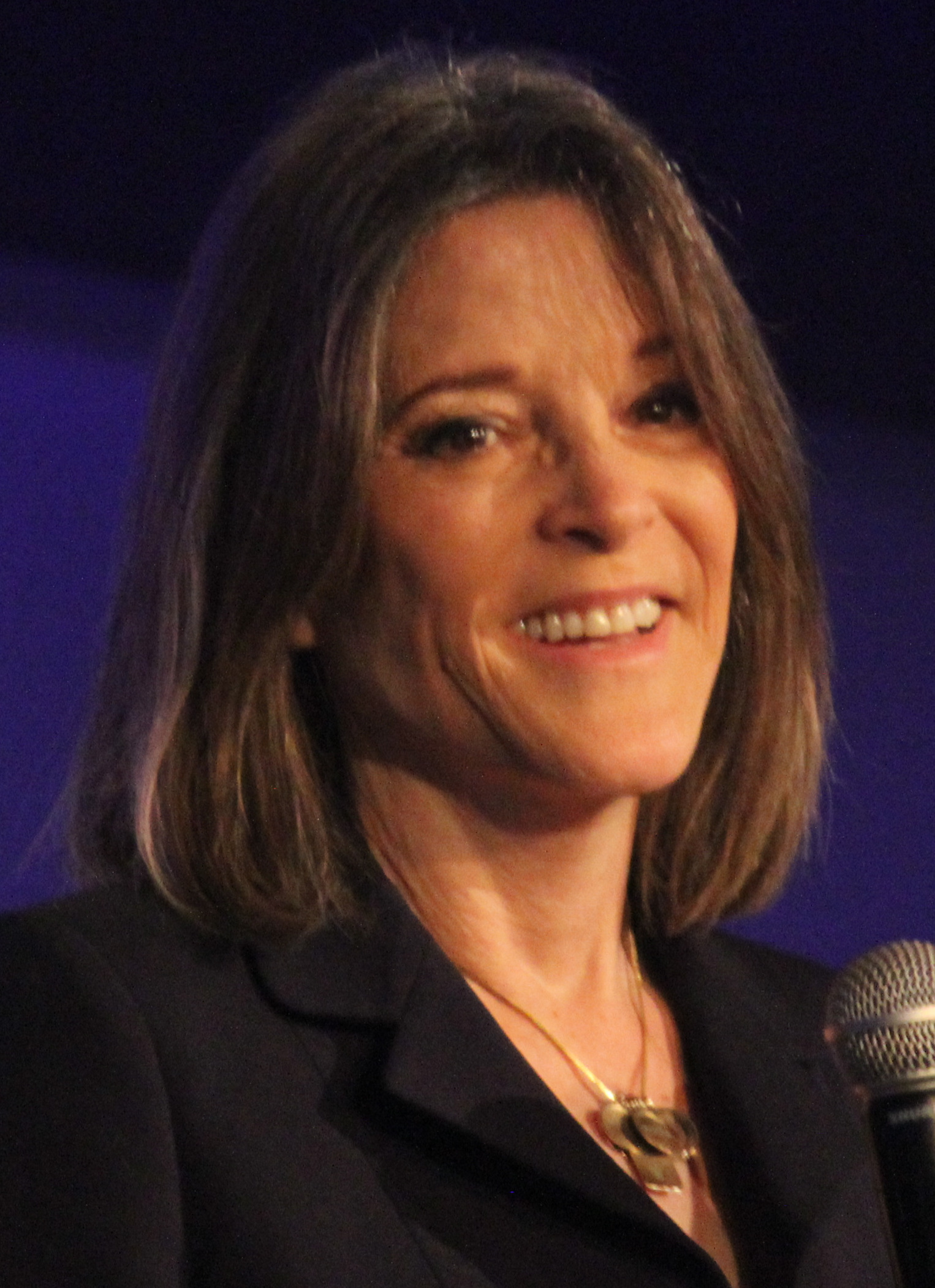
Self-help author Marianne Williamson, attended 1970 to 1972

Name	Class year	Notability	Ref.
Fong Foo Sec	Preparatory school, (Note: Pomona operated a preparatory department, which taught pre-college level courses, from its founding until 1911.) transferred 1901	Chinese educator and publicist, Pomona's first Asian student, English department editor of The Commercial Press	
Essae Martha Culver	1905	First state librarian of Louisiana and president of the American Library Association	
Clara Breed	1927	Librarian who opposed Japanese internment during World War II and supported children sent to camps	
Edwin B. Crittenden	1938	Alaskan architect	
David Ossman	Transferred in 1956	Writer and comedian best known as a member of the Firesign Theatre	
Twyla Tharp	Transferred in 1960	Emmy and Tony award-winning dancer and choreographer	
Marianne Williamson	Attended 1970–1972	Author, spiritual leader, activist, and 2020 presidential candidate	
Don Daglow	1974	Video game designer and producer	
Eddie Dombrower	1980	Video game designer and producer	
Alex Linder	1988	Owner and operator of the Vanguard News Network, an antisemitic, white supremacist website	

=== Government and law ===
==== U.S. senators and congresspeople ====
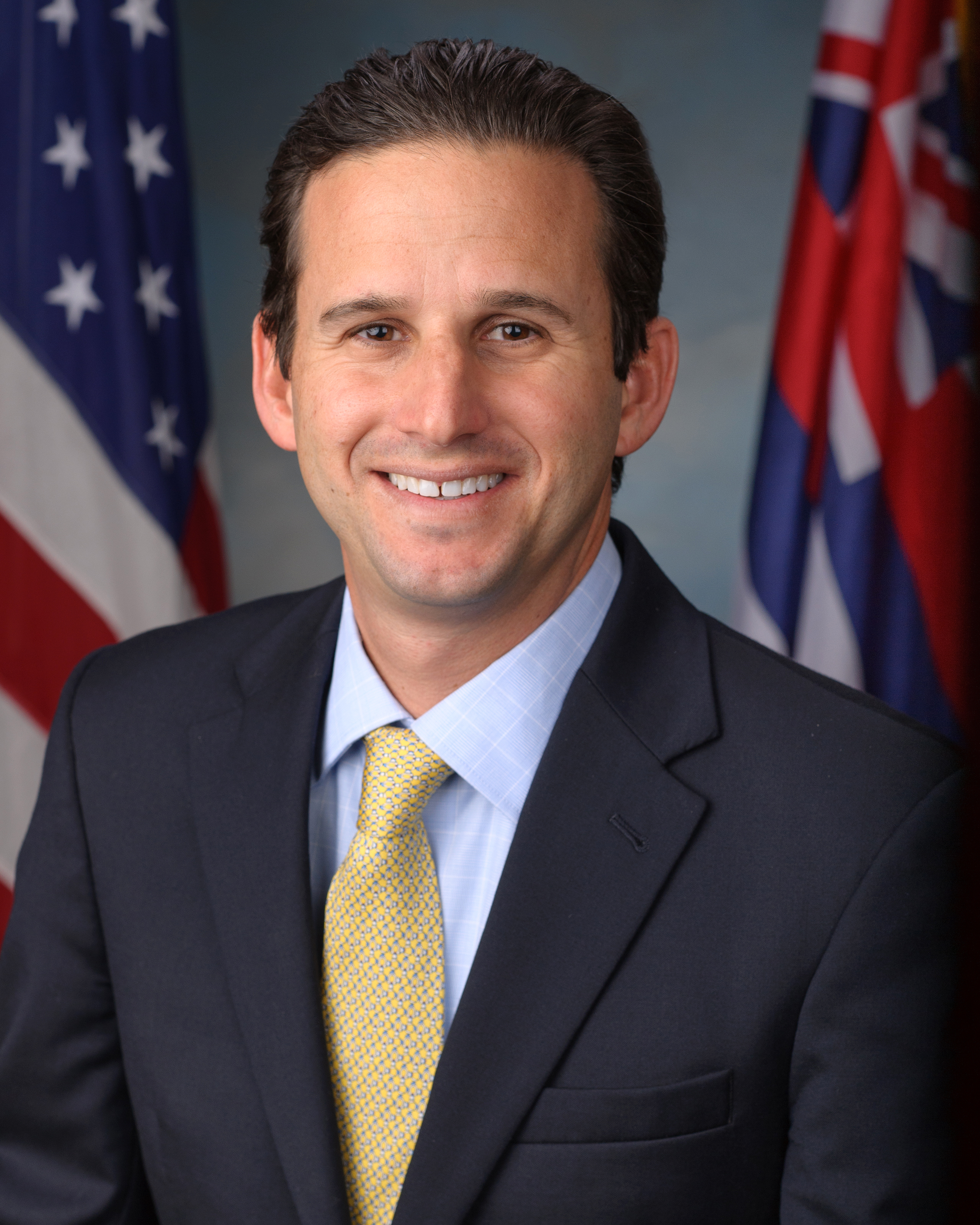
U.S. Senator Brian Schatz (D‑HI), class of 1994

Name	Class year	Notability	Ref.
Alan Cranston	Transferred 1933	Democratic U.S. senator for California (1969–1993)	
Frank Evans	Attended 1941–1943	Democratic U.S. representative for Colorado's 3rd district (1965–1979)	
Chip Pashayan	1963	Republican U.S. representative for California's 17th district (1979–1991)	
Brian Schatz	1994	Democratic U.S. senator for Hawaii (2012–present)	

==== Federal officials ====
Name	Class year	Notability	Ref.
Leslie A. Wheeler	1921	U.S. government official and diplomat who helped liberalize international agricultural trade	
William B. Bader	1953	U.S. assistant secretary of state for educational and cultural affairs	
Phyllis Fong	1975	Inspector general of the United States Department of Agriculture	
Colleen Hartman	1986	Director of the Space Studies Board, director of the Science and Exploration Directorate at NASA Goddard	
Esther Brimmer	1983	U.S. foreign policy expert and assistant secretary of state for international organization affairs	
Michael J. Adler	1986	U.S. ambassador to South Sudan, former director of the Office of Afghanistan Affairs	
Eric Kneedler	1995	Diplomat, U.S. ambassador to Rwanda, deputy chief of mission to Kenya	
David Holmes	1997	Diplomat and counselor for political affairs at the U.S. Embassy in Ukraine	

==== State and city officials ====
Name	Class year	Notability	Ref.
Silsby Spalding	Preparatory school, c. 1904	First mayor of Beverly Hills, California	
Mark Wyland	1968	Republican California senator	
Ellen Bard	1971	Republican member of the Pennsylvania House of Representatives	
Tick Segerblom	1971	Democratic Nevada senator	
Lorig Charkoudian	1995	Member of the Maryland House of Delegates representing District 20, executive director of Community Mediation Maryland	
Cristina Garcia	1999	Democratic California Assemblyperson	

==== Judges ====
Name	Class year	Notability	Ref.
James Marshall Carter	1924	Judge, United States Court of Appeals for the Ninth Circuit	
Harry L. Hupp	Attended 1947–1950	Judge, United States District Court for the Central District of California, known for reforming treatment of alcoholism	
Stephen Reinhardt	1951	Judge, United States Court of Appeals for the Ninth Circuit	
Cruz Reynoso	1953	First Latino on the California Supreme Court, advocate for civil rights of farm workers; awarded the Presidential Medal of Freedom in 2000	
George H. Wu	1969	Judge, United States District Court for the Central District of California	
Christina A. Snyder	1972	Judge, United States District Court for the Central District of California	
Richard G. Taranto	1977	Judge, United States Court of Appeals for the Federal Circuit	
Kimberly J. Mueller	1981	Judge, United States District Court for the Eastern District of California	
Michelle Williams Court	1988	Judge, United States District Court for the Central District of California	
Halim Dhanidina	1994	Judge, California Court of Appeal for the Second District; first Muslim judge in the state of California	
Eumi K. Lee	1994	Judge, United States District Court for the Northern District of California; first Korean-American judge appointed to Alameda County Superior Court	

==== Diplomats ====
Name	Class year	Notability	Ref.
Hugh S. Gibson	Attended c. 1900	U.S. interwar diplomat, ambassador, proponent of the professionalization of the Foreign Service	
Julian Nava	1951	First Mexican-American to become U.S. ambassador to Mexico	
Kenneth L. Brown	1959	U.S. ambassador to Ghana, Côte d'Ivoire, and Congo-Brazzaville	
Esther Brimmer	1983	U.S. assistant secretary of state, foreign policy expert	

==== Activists ====
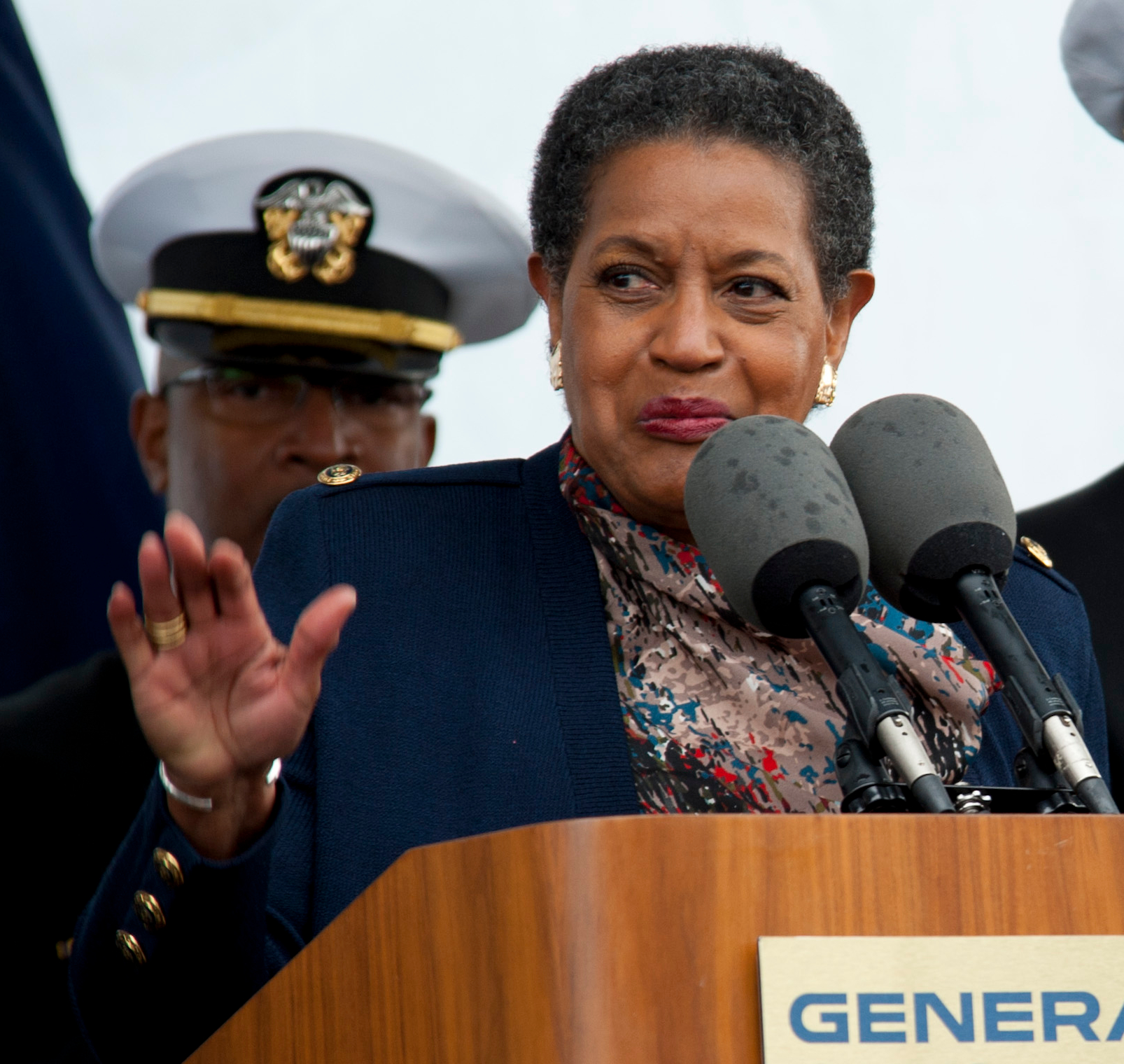
Civil rights activist Myrlie Evers-Williams, class of 1968

Name	Class year	Notability	Ref.
Virginia Prince	1935	Transgender rights activist and founder of Transvestia magazine	
Henry Pope Anderson	1949	Farm labor union organizer, director of research at Agricultural Workers Organizing Committee	
Joan Dye Gussow	1950	Food policy activist and environmentalist, Mary Swartz Rose Professor emerita at the Teachers College, Columbia University	
Candie Carawan	1965	Civil rights activist, popularized "We Shall Overcome"	
Sharon Camp	1965	Activist, policy expert and founder of the Guttmacher Institute, brought Plan B to market	
Myrlie Evers‑Williams	1968	Activist, first full-time chairperson of the NAACP	
John Payton	1973	Civil rights attorney and president of NAACP Legal Defense Fund (co-founded Black Student Union at Pomona)	
Susan Morton Blaustein	1975	Founder and director of WomenStrong International, lecturer at Columbia University, Guggenheim Fellowship recipient	
Denise Moreno Ducheny	1976	Lawyer, former California state senator serving District 40, senior policy advisor at the Center for U.S.-Mexican Studies	
Jamie Court	1999	Author, political activist, consumer advocate, president of Consumer Watchdog	
Martina Vandenberg	1990	Activist, Rhodes Scholar, Truman Scholar, founder and president of the Human Trafficking Legal Center	
Kafi D. Blumenfield	1993	Nonprofit executive, activist, and civic leader	
Debra Cleaver	1999	Activist, nonprofit executive, and founder of Vote.org	

==== Military ====
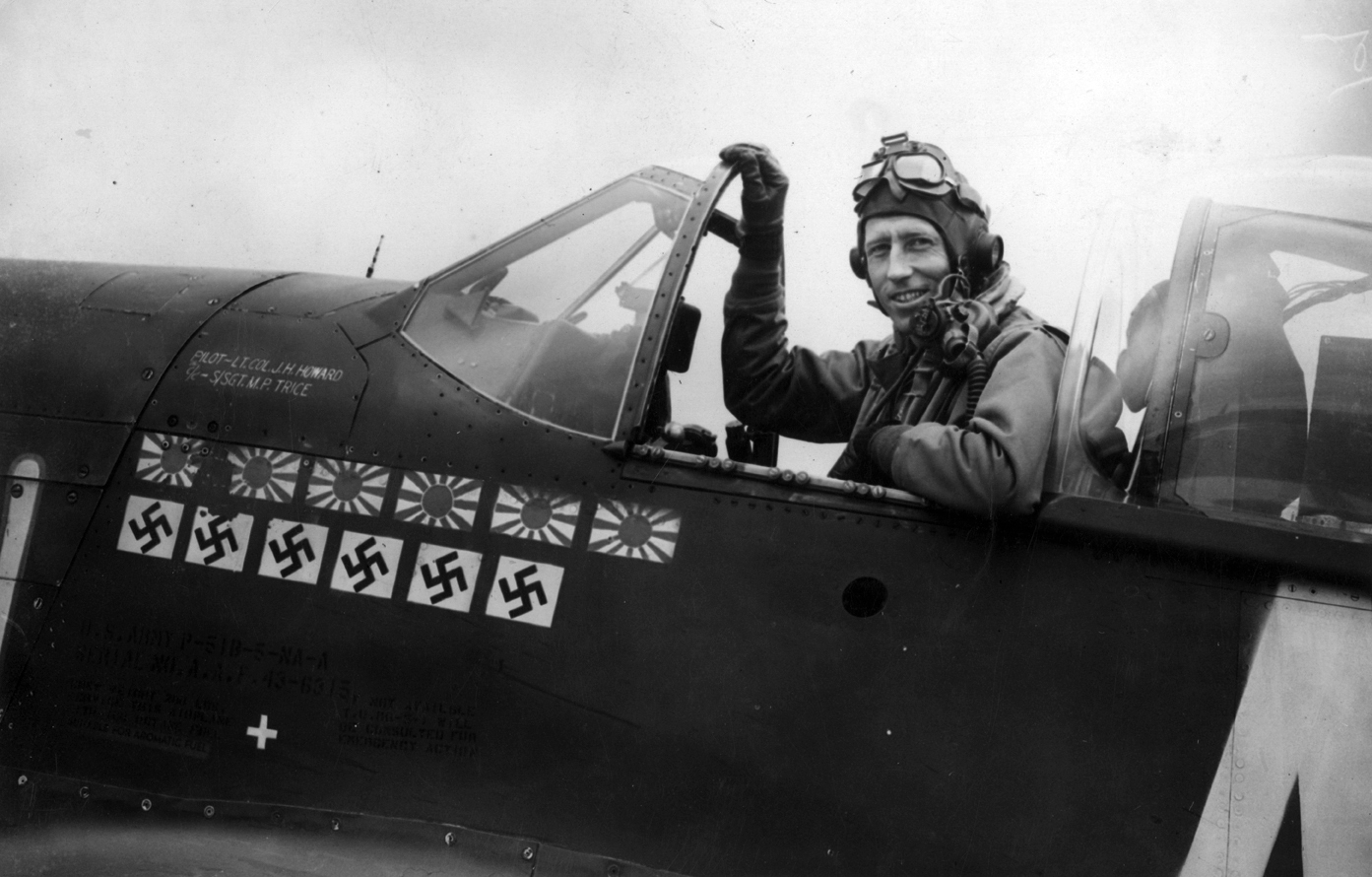
James Howard, class of 1937, was the only fighter pilot in the European Theater to receive the Medal of Honor in World War II.

Name	Class year	Notability	Ref.
James H. Howard	1937	Brigadier general, member of the Flying Tigers during World War II and Medal of Honor recipient	
Verne Orr	1937	U.S. secretary of the Air Force, 1981–1985	

=== Business ===
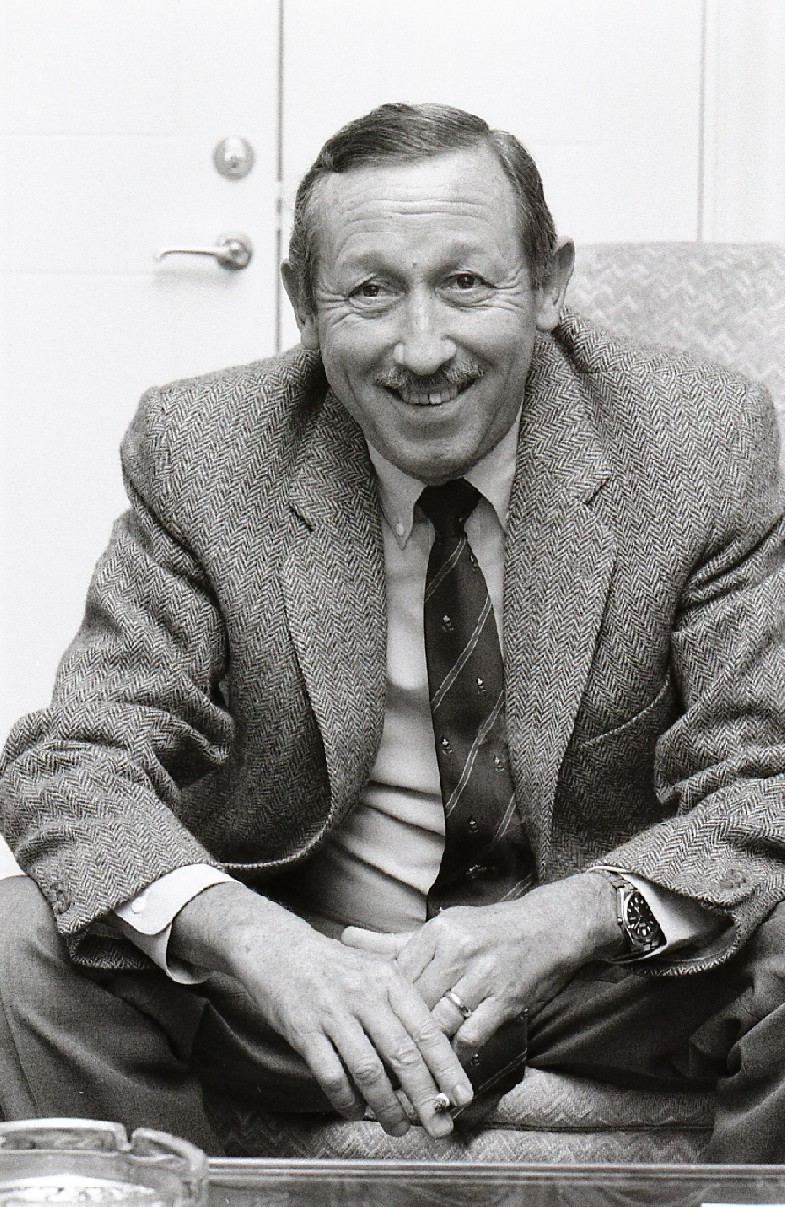
Senior Disney executive Roy E. Disney, class of 1951

Name	Class year	Notability	Ref.
Russell K. Pitzer	1900	Citrus farmer, founder of Pitzer College	
Frank R. Seaver	1905	Lawyer, naval officer, oil drilling executive, and philanthropist; first president of the Associated Students of Pomona College	
Donald McKenna	1929	Businessperson and philanthropist, known for donations to Claremont McKenna College	
R. Stanton Avery	1932	Inventor of modern stickers, founder of Avery Adhesives	
Elmer P. Wheaton	1933	Aerospace and marine engineer and executive at the Douglas Aircraft Company and the Lockheed Missiles and Space Company	
Charles Scripps	1943	Chair of the board of the E. W. Scripps Company	
Richard C. Seaver	1946	Oil drilling executive and philanthropist	
Roy E. Disney	1951	Executive at The Walt Disney Company; nephew of Walt Disney	
Frank Wells	1952	President of The Walt Disney Company and mountaineer	
Burton Smith	Transferred 1959	Computer architect, co-founder of Cray, and Microsoft Fellow	
Linda G. Alvarado	1973	CEO of Alvarado Construction; co-owner of the Colorado Rockies	
Cathy Corison	1975	Winemaker	
Hashim Djojohadikusumo	1976	Indonesian entrepreneur and brother of former Indonesian presidential candidate Prabowo Subianto	
Lynn Forester de Rothschild	1976	CEO of E.L. Rothschild	
Alison Rempel Brown	1980	President of the Science Museum of Minnesota	
Kiki Ramos Gindler	1983	Philanthropist, president and on board of directors of the Center Theatre Group	
Adam Bronfman	1985	Philanthropist, president of the Samuel Bronfman Foundation	
Bernard C. Chan	1988	Convenor of the Hong Kong Executive Council and president of Asia Financial Holdings	
Adam Zbar	1991	Venture capitalist, CEO and founder of Hamsa	
Osman Kibar	1992	Billionaire founder of biotech firm Samumed	
Laszlo Bock	1993	Former senior vice president, People Operations, Google, and co-founder and CEO of Humu	
Adam Bowen	1998	Billionaire co-founder and chief technology officer of Juul	
Jane Chen	2000	Taiwanese American co-founder and CEO of Embrace Global	
Nick Friedman	2005	President and co-founder of College Hunks Hauling Junk	
Maya Horgan Famodu	2012	Founder of Ingressive, named on Forbes Africa's "30 Under 30" list in 2018	

=== Science ===
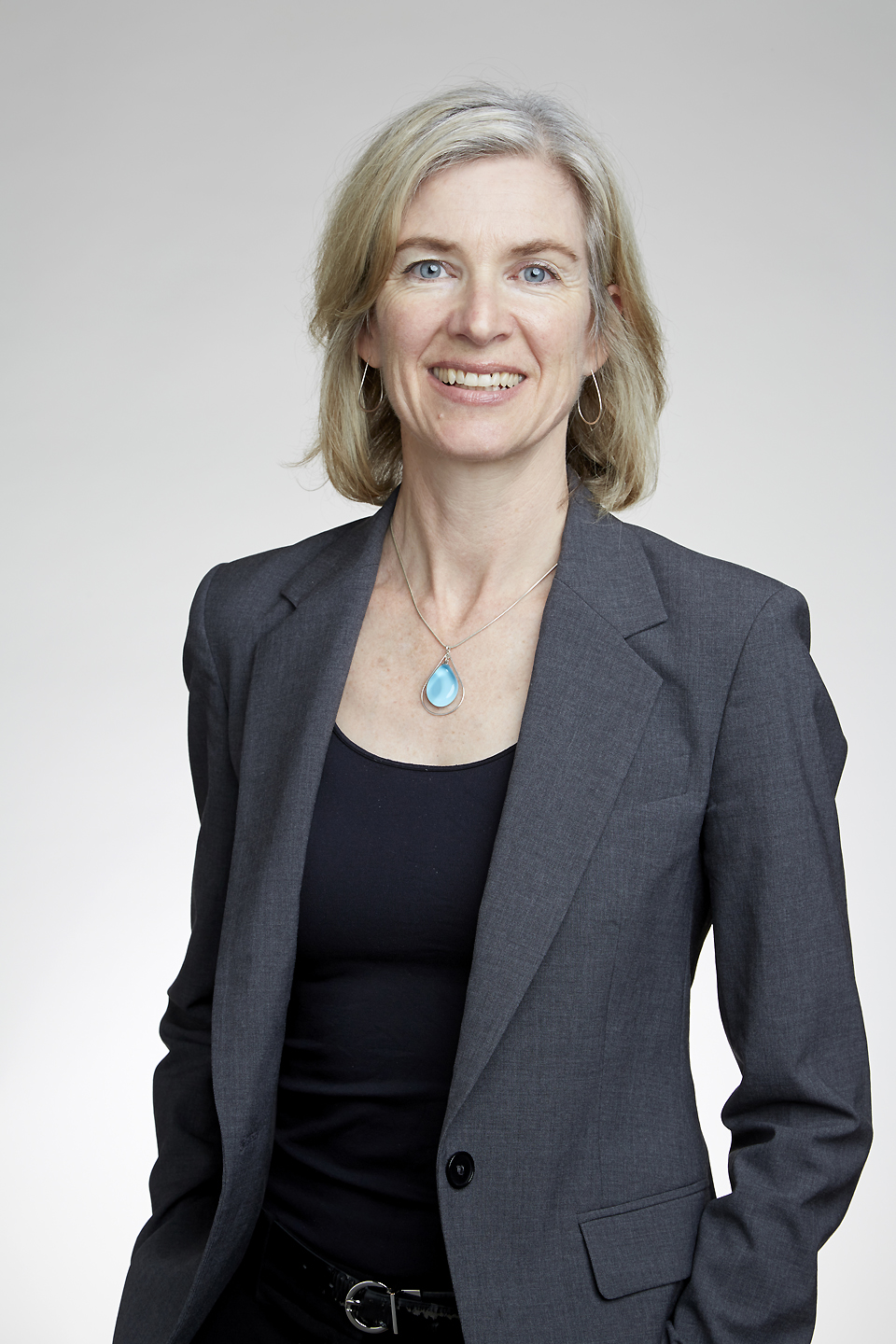
Jennifer Doudna, class of 1985, won the 2020 Nobel Prize in Chemistry for her work on CRISPR-based gene engineering, one of the most significant discoveries in the history of biology.

Name	Class year	Notability	Ref.
Edmund Jaeger	Attended 1900s	Desert ecologist	
Wilson Popenoe	Attended 1910–1911	Agricultural explorer, influential in bringing the avocado to North America	
Hugo Benioff	1921	Seismologist, known for work charting deep ocean earthquakes	
M. Stanley Livingston	1926	Physicist, co-inventor of the cyclotron	
Norris Bradbury	1929	Physicist, director of the Los Alamos National Laboratory 1945–1970	
Roger Revelle	1929	Oceanographer, one of the first scientists to study global warming, and primary founder of the University of California, San Diego	
Xiao Guangyan	1942	Chinese petrochemist who researched catalysts used in petroleum processing	
Robert Gomer	1944	Physical chemist, known for work in surface science and nuclear non-proliferation advocacy	
Jean Mill	1948	Conservationist and creator of the Bengal cat breed	
M. Frederick Hawthorne	1949	Inorganic chemist, known for work on clusters of boron hydrides; National Medal of Science recipient	
Edward A. Knapp	1954	Physicist, director of the National Science Foundation	
Ann Hardy	1955	Computer scientist, known for pioneering work on time-sharing	
Ed Krupp	1961	Archeoastronomer, science educator, and director of the Griffith Observatory	
Thomas D. Pollard	1964	Cell biologist and biophysicist	
Sarah Elgin	1967	Biochemist, geneticist, and science educator	
J. Andrew McCammon	1969	Physical chemist	
Steven Clarke	1970	Biochemist	
Julie Buring	1971	Epidemiologist and professor of medicine at Harvard Medical School	
Moses Chao	1972	Biochemist, known for work on nerve growth factor	
Sharon K. Inouye	1977	Geriatrician, known for work on delirium	
Keith Horne	1977	Fellowship of the Royal Society of Edinburgh, American Astronomer, emeritus professor of Physics and Astronomy at the University of St Andrews, known for discovery of Qatar-1b, recipient of the Herschel Medal	
Anna María Nápoles	1980	Behavioral epidemiologist and science administrator	
Emil Kakkis	1982	Medical geneticist; founder and CEO of Ultragenyx Pharmaceutical Inc.	
Jennifer Doudna	1985	Biochemist, known for pioneering work in CRISPR gene editing; won the 2020 Nobel Prize in Chemistry	
Allison Sekuler	1986	Neuroscientist, president of Baycrest Academy for Research and Education	
Thomas McDade	1991	Biological anthropologist	
Amalie Frischknecht	1992	Polymer physicist	
Katherine Pollard	1995	Director of the Gladstone Institute, professor of Epidemiology and Biostatisics at the University of California, San Francisco, Chan Zuckerberg Biohub investigator, fellow of the California Academy of Sciences, fellow of the International Society for Computational Biology, fellow of the American Institute of Medical and Biological Engineering, fellow of the American Association for the Advancement of Science	
Amie Boal	2002	Chemist, Nicholas and Gelsa Pelick Family Chair in Science at Pennsylvania State University	

=== Religion ===
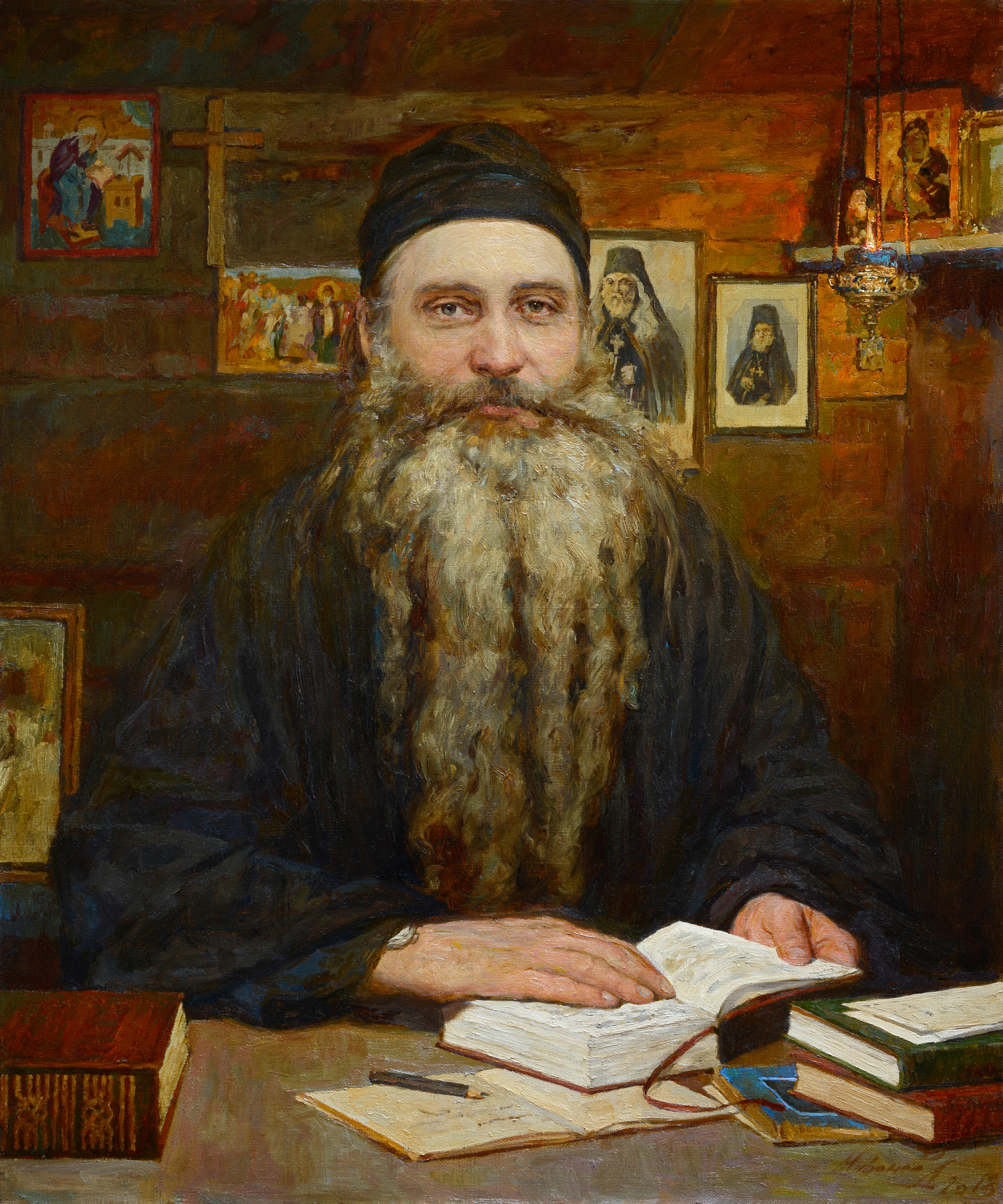
Russian Orthodox hieromonk Seraphim Rose, class of 1956 (oil portrait by Andrey Mironov)

Name	Class year	Notability	Ref.
Charles E. Fuller	1910	Clergyman and radio evangelist who founded the Fuller Theological Seminary	
Gladwyn M. Childs	1919	Minister, missionary, and anthropologist	
Seraphim (Eugene) Rose	1956	Russian Orthodox hieromonk	
Nancy Raabe	1977	Lutheran pastor and composer	
Megan Traquair	1985	Eighth bishop of the Episcopal Diocese of Northern California	

=== Academia ===
==== College presidents ====
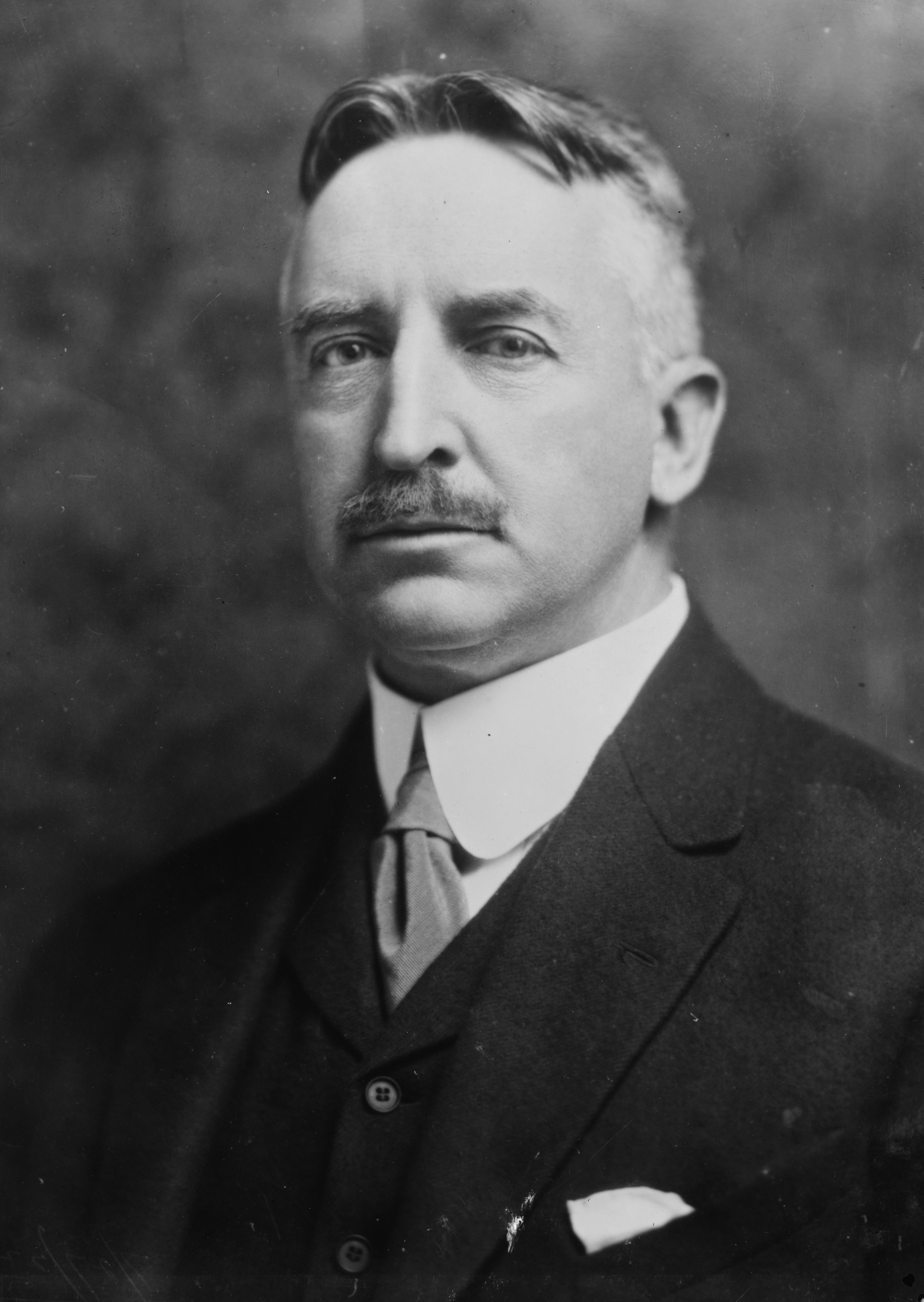
Anthropologist David P. Barrows, class of 1894, conducted extensive ethnographic research on Native Americans.

Name	Class year	Notability	Ref.
David Prescott Barrows	1894	Ninth president of the University of California, anthropologist, major general in the California National Guard, and first editor of The Student Life	c
John V. Lombardi	1963	Fifth president of the Louisiana State University System	
R. Stanton Hales	1964	10th president of the College of Wooster and two-time U.S. badminton men's singles champion	
Eileen Wilson‑Oyelaran	1969	17th president of Kalamazoo College	
Thomas E. Crow	1969	Rosalie Solow Professor of Modern Art at the New York University Institute of Fine Arts	
Alexander Gonzalez	1956	President of California State University, Sacramento; recipient of the Ohtli Award, administered by the Mexican Government	
Anne M. Houtman	1983	20th president of Earlham College	
Thomas J. Minar	1985	16th president of Franklin College in Indiana	
Erika H. James	1991	Dean of the Wharton School of Business at the University of Pennsylvania	

==== Professors and academics ====
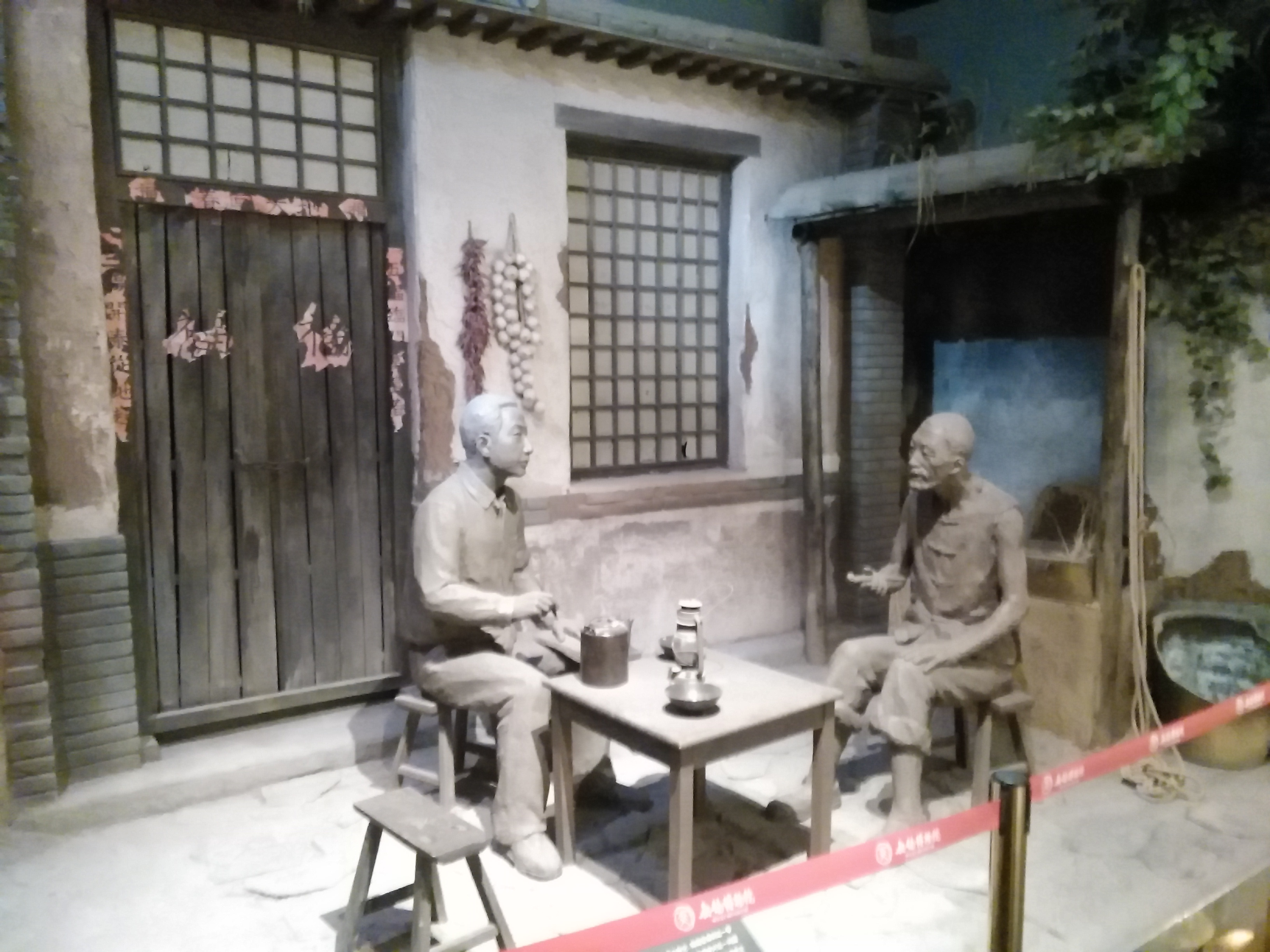
A statue depicting Chinese sociologist Chen Hansheng, class of 1920, conducting a field interview with a peasant farmer in Baoding

Name	Class year	Notability	Ref.
Carl Irving Wheat	1915	Lawyer, historian, and cartographer of the American West	
Chen Hansheng	1920	Chinese sociologist considered a father of Chinese modern social science	
Edwin Sill Fussell	1943	Professor of English at University of California, Berkeley, Pomona College, and University of California, San Diego	
Robert Lawson Vaught	1945	Mathematician, founder of model theory	
David Keirsey	1947	Psychologist who developed the Keirsey Temperament Sorter personality questionnaire	
Ellis Batten Page	1947	Professor and scientist, widely acknowledged as the father of automated essay scoring	
John K. Roth	1962	Holocaust studies scholar, Claremont McKenna College	
Lawrence G. Sager	1963	Alice Jane Drysdale Sheffield Regents Chair and Former Dean, University of Texas School of Law	
Marcia J. Bates	1963	Professor emerita of information studies at the UCLA School of Education and Information Studies, fellow of the American Association for the Advancement of Science	
Mary Lindenstein Walshok	1964	Educational sociologist, associate vice chancellor for Extended Studies and Public Programs and professor of sociology at University of California, San Diego	
Ifeanyi Menkiti	1964	Philosopher, professor of philosophy at Wellesley College, owner of Grolier Poetry Book Shop	
Charles E. Phelps	1965	Economist, university professor and provost emeritus at the University of Rochester	
Adela Collins	1967	New Testament scholar, Buckingham Professor Emeritus of New Testament Criticism and Interpretation at Yale Divinity School	
Laurel Beckett	1968	Biostatistician in Alzheimer's disease, professor emerita at University of California, Davis	
James Miller	1969	Professor of Liberal Studies and Politics; faculty director of Creative Publishing & Critical Journalism at The New School; Guggenheim Fellow; editor of Daedalus; NEH fellow	
Roger Maddux	1969	Mathematics and Computer Science professor, Iowa State University	
Marianne Mithun	1969	Linguist specializing in Native American Languages, founding president of the Society for Linguistic Anthropology, member of the Norwegian Academy of Science and Letters, fellow and 95th president of the Linguistic Society of America, recipient of the Neil and Saras Smith Medal for Linguistics, professor of linguistics at University of California, Santa Barbara	
Michael Starbird	1970	Mathematics professor, University of Texas at Austin	
Ingrid D. Rowland	1974	Historian of European architecture at the University of Notre Dame	
James A. Secord	1975	Historian of science, emeritus professor at the University of Cambridge, director of the Darwin Correspondence Project	
Robyn R. Warhol	1977	Chair of the Department of English at Ohio State University and literary critic who helped develop feminist narrative theory	
Michael Paradiso	1978	Chairman of the National Eye Institute's Central Visual Processing Study Section, professor of neuroscience, Ophthalmology at Brown University	
R. Michael Rich	1979	Astrophysicist, doctoral advisor of Neil deGrasse Tyson, professor at the University of California, Los Angeles	
Alison Brysk	1981	International human rights scholar at University of California, Santa Barbara, fellow of the Woodrow Wilson International Center for Scholars	
Renee Marlin-Bennett	1981	Professor of Political Science at Johns Hopkins University, editor-in-chief of the Oxford Research Encyclopedia of International Studies	
Marla Stone	1982	Historian of fascism at Occidental College, Andrew W. Mellon Humanities professor at the American Academy in Rome	
Matthew K. Franklin	1983	Cryptographer and professor of computer science at the University of California, Davis	
Joanne B. Freeman	1984	Historian of early American history at Yale University	
Sharon Inkelas	1984	Distinguished Professor of Linguistics and former chair at the University of California, Berkeley, fellow of the Linguistic Society of America	
Caroline Winterer	1988	Historian of pre-20th-century American history at Stanford University	
Madeline Y. Hsu	1989	Historian at the University of Texas at Austin, director of the Center for Global Migration Studies at University of Maryland and fellow of the Society of American Historians	
Vijay Prashad	1989	History professor at Trinity College in Connecticut	
Catherine Ceniza Choy	1991	Professor of ethnic studies at University of California, Berkeley	
Tamily Weissman‑Unni	1992	Neurobiology professor at Lewis & Clark College	
Catherine Sugar	1992	Biostatistician at University of California, Los Angeles, fellow of the American Statistical Association	
Tara Nummedal	1992	John Nickoll Provost's Professor of History, Chair of History Department at Brown University	
Amy Lyford	1993	Art historian at Occidental College	
Roberta Hamme	1993	Chemical Oceanographer, professor of Earth and Ocean Sciences at the University of Victoria, Canada Research Chair in Ocean Carbon Dynamics	
Daniel Ziblatt	1995	Director of the Minda de Gunzburg Center for European Studies; Eaton Professor of the Science of Government at Harvard University	
Cynthia Wyels	1996	Mathematician, co-director of the Alliance for Minority Participation	
Omayra Ortega	2001	Mathematician, president of the National Association of Mathematicians	
Alexandra Hui	2001	Professor of the History of Science and Technology at Mississippi State University, sound studies Academic	
Hilary Parker	2008	Biostatistician, senior data analyst at Stitch Fix, co-host of Not So Standard Deviations, data scientist for the 2020 Biden campaign	

=== Athletics ===
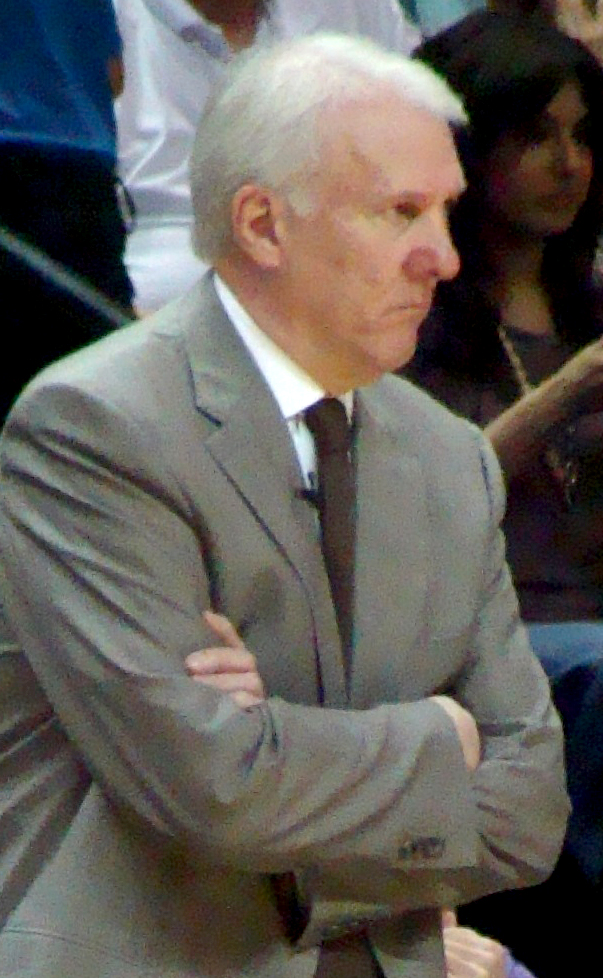
NBA Championship head coach of the San Antonio Spurs Gregg Popovich coached the Pomona men's basketball team from 1979 to 1987.

Name	Class year	Notability	Ref.
Harry Kingman	1913	Pitcher for the New York Yankees	
Charles Daggs	1923	Olympic track and field athlete	
Robert Maxwell	1925	Olympic hurdler and two-time national champion	
Earl J. Merritt	1925	Head football coach of the Sagehens from 1935 to 1958	
David G. Freeman	1942	Seven-time U.S. national badminton champion	
Betty Hicks	1947	Golfer, 1941 Associated Press Female Athlete of the Year	
Darlene Hard	1961	Grand Slam–winning tennis player	
Marilyn Ramenofsky	1969	Olympic silver medalist swimmer, and former women's 400-meter freestyle world record holder	
Penny Lee Dean	1977	Long-distance swimmer and world record-holder for the fastest swim across the English Channel in 1978; later coached the Pomona women's swimming and diving team for more than 25 years	
Mike Budenholzer	1992	Head coach of the Atlanta Hawks, Milwaukee Bucks, and Phoenix Suns	
Will Leer	2007	Professional track and field athlete specializing in the 1500 meters	
Andrew Palmer	2014	Racing driver	
Daniel Rosenbaum	2019	Professional basketball player in the Israeli Basketball Premier League	

== Notable faculty ==
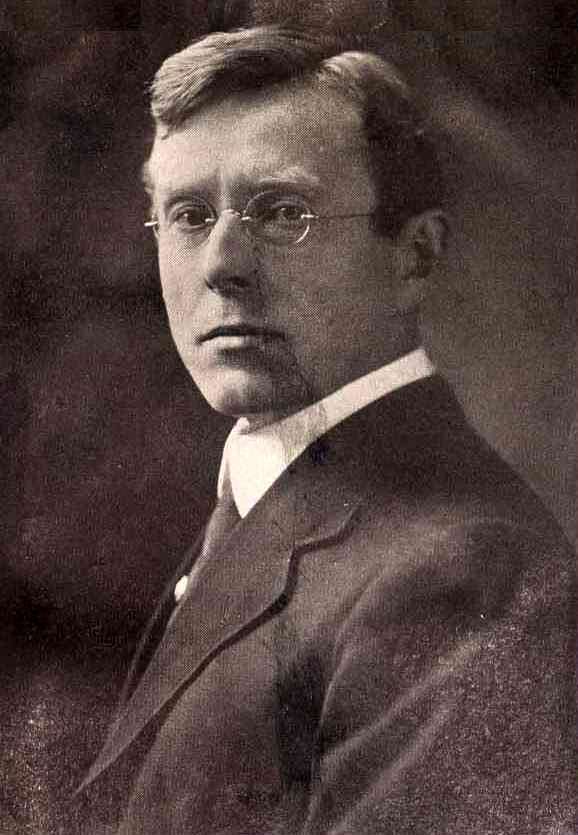
Astronomer Frank Brackett, Pomona professor 1888–1933

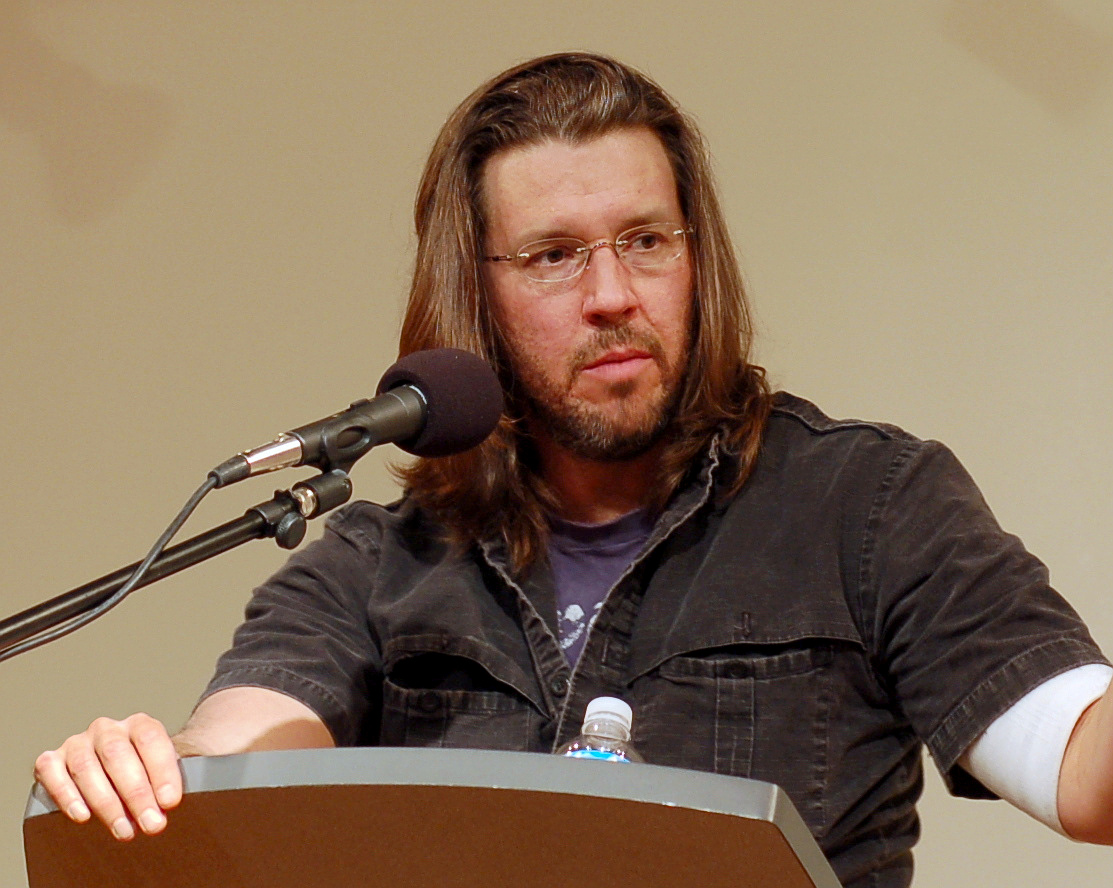
Author David Foster Wallace, Pomona professor 2002–2008

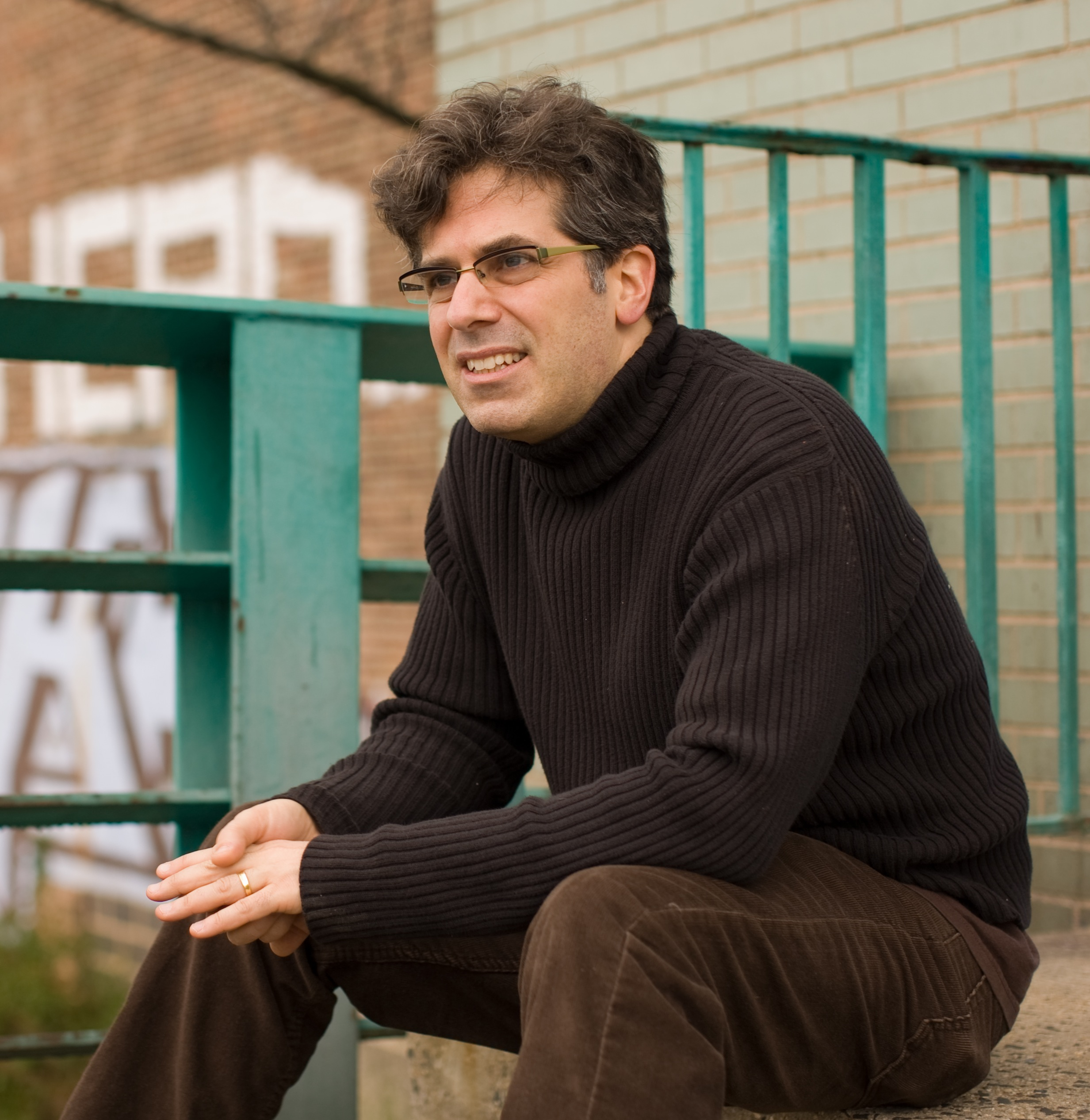
Novelist Jonathan Lethem, Pomona professor 2011–present

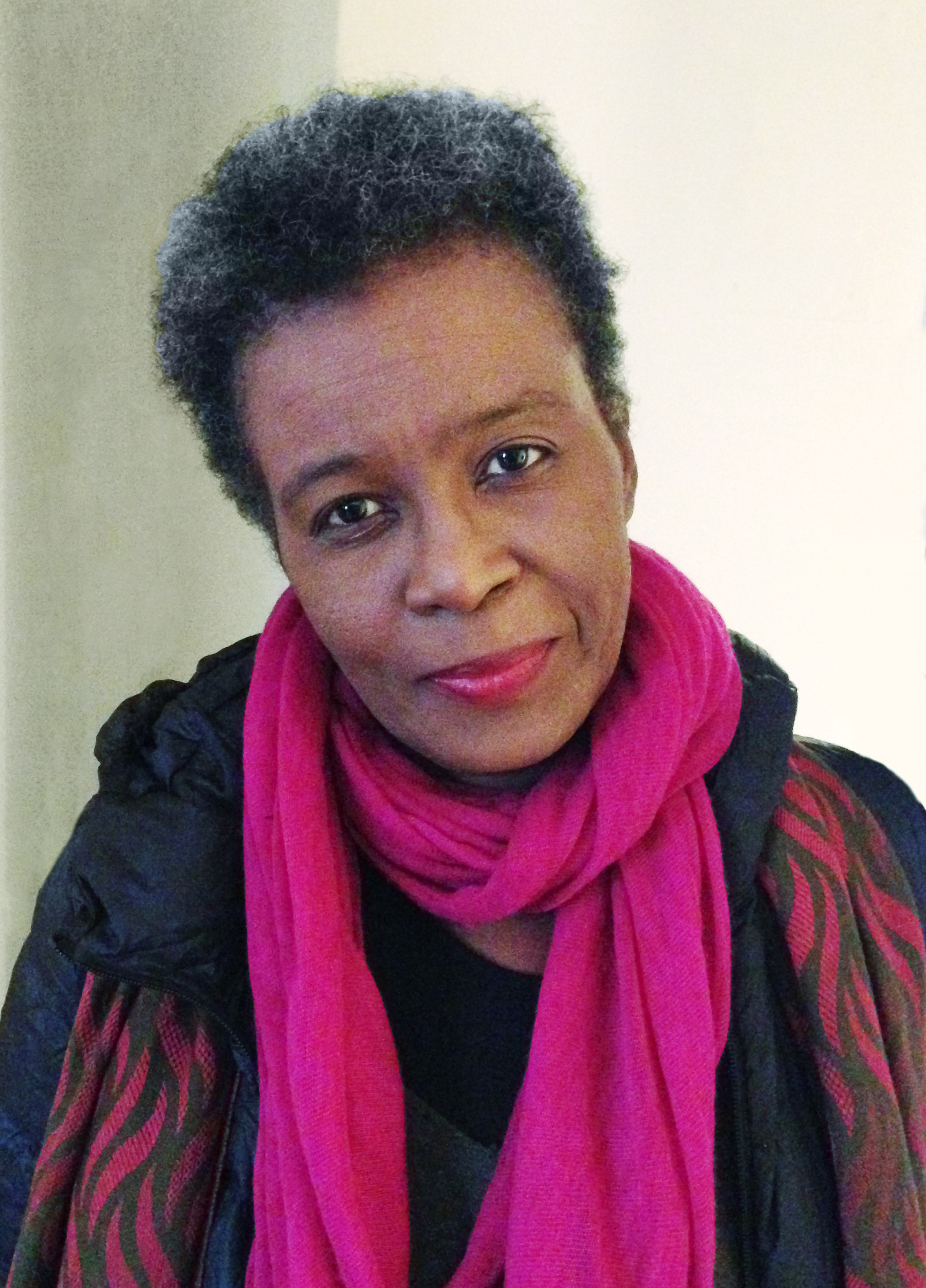
Poet Claudia Rankine, Pomona professor 2006–2015

Name	Active tenure	Notability	Ref.
Edwin C. Norton	1888–1926	First dean of Pomona	
Frank Brackett	1888–1933	Mathematics and astronomy professor	
Phebe Estelle Spalding	1889–1927	English professor, author, first female Pomona faculty member	
Albert John Cook	1894–1911	Entomologist	
Alice Mary Dowd	1904–1905	Educator, author	
Hannah Tempest Jenkins	1905–1926	Painter, helped establish Pomona's art department and founded the Rembrandt Club	
Fannie Charles Dillon^{†}	1910–1913	Composer	
Alfred Woodford^{†}	1915–1955	Founder of Pomona's geology department	
Philip A. Munz	1917–1944	Botanist who began the Pomona College Herbarium and was director of the Rancho Santa Ana Botanic Garden	
Ralph Lyman	1917–1948	Longtime head of Pomona's music department	
Jerry Voorhis	1930–1935	Democratic U.S. representative for California's 12th district (1937–1947)	
John H. Kemble	1936–1977	Maritime historian	
Henry Cord Meyer	c. 1945–1964	Historian of central Europe	
W. Conway Pierce	1945–1953	Chemist	
Corwin Hansch	1946–1988	Chemist	
Jean Walton	1949–1979	Dean of women who reformed Pomona's residential life and co-founded its women's studies program	
James Grant	1950–1959	Painter, sculptor	
Karl Kohn	1950–1994	Composer	
Frederick Sontag	1952–2009	Philosopher and theologian	
Leonard Pronko	1957–2014	Leading Western expert on Japanese dance-drama kabuki, awarded the Order of the Sacred Treasure in 1986	
Lewis Baltz	c. 1960s	Photographer	
Michael Armacost	1960s	Diplomat, ambassador to Japan and the Philippines, and president of the Brookings Institution	
Stanley Crouch	c. 1969–c. 1975	Cultural critic known for coverage of jazz, novelist, and English professor	
Gerald M. Ackerman	1971–1989	Art history professor	
George Gorse	1980–present	Art history professor	
Steven Koblik	1972–1992	President of Reed College, president of the Huntington Library	
Martha Andresen Wilder	1972–2006	Scholar of Renaissance literature	
Bobby Bradford	1974–2021	Jazz musician	
Robert Mezey	1976–2000	Poet and translator	
Frank Gibney	c. 1979–c. 2006	Journalist known for humane postwar portraits of Japan and founder of the Pacific Basin Institute; awarded the Order of the Rising Sun in 1976	
Gregg Popovich	1979–1988	Head basketball coach of the NBA's San Antonio Spurs	
Karl Benjamin	1979–1994	Abstract painter	
Everett L. Bull^{†}	1981–c. 2020	Computer scientist	
Thomas Leabhart	1982–present	Corporeal mime	
Samuel H. Yamashita	1983–present	Historian and Asian studies scholar	
Kenneth B. Wolf	1985–present	Scholar of medieval studies	
Eleanor P. Brown^{†}	1986–present	Economist, co-editor of the Review of Economics of the Household	
Susana Chavez‑Silverman	1989–present	Creative nonfiction writer on Latin American culture	
Dorinne Kondo	1989–1997	Anthropologist and cultural theorist, playwright, and director of Asian American Studies at the University of Southern California	
Shahriar Shahriari	1989–present	Mathematician	
Pamela H. Smith	1990–2005	Historian of Science, Founding Director of the Making and Knowing Project	
Larissa Rudova	1991–present	Yale B. and Lucille D. Griffith Professor of Modern Languages	
Katherine Hagedorn	1993–2013	Ethnomusicologist and Santería priestess	
Ami Radunskaya	1994–present	Mathematician, president of the Association for Women in Mathematics	
Cecilia Conrad	1995–2012	Economist, managing director of the MacArthur Fellows Program	
Hilary Bok	1997–2000	Bio-ethicist and Henry R. Luce Professor of Bioethics and Moral & Political Theory at Johns Hopkins University	
Peter Thielke	2001–present	Historian of modern philosophy	
David Foster Wallace	2002–2008	Essayist and novelist, author of Infinite Jest	
Jo Hardin^{†}	2002–present	Statistician and Fellow of the American Statistical Association	
Robert R. Gaines	2003–present	Geologist, acting president, dean of the college	
Oona Eisenstadt	2004–present	Canadian-American religious studies scholar, Fred Krinsky Professor of Jewish Studies and professor of Religious Studies	
Kim Bruce^{†}	2005–2021	Computer scientist	
Erin M. Runions	2005–present	Canadian-American, religious studies Scholar, Nancy J. Lyon Professor of Biblical History and Literature	
Claudia Rankine	2006–2015	Poet	
Susan McWilliams Barndt	2006–2026	Political theorist, co-editor of American Political Thought	
Sandeep Mukherjee	2006–2021	Indian-American artist	
Meredith Landman	c. 2010–2018	Linguist	
Jonathan Lethem	2011–present	Novelist, author of Fortress of Solitude	
Amanda Hollis-Brusky	2011–present	Constitutional law scholar, editor of The Monkey Cage	
Cameron Munter	2013–2015	Diplomat, ambassador to Serbia and Pakistan	
Edray Goins	2018–present	Mathematician, president of the National Association of Mathematicians, preserver of the Mathematicians of the African Diaspora	
Lise Abrams	2018–present	Cognitive psychologist	
Arlen F. Chase	2019–2023	Mesoamerican archaeologist, Comparative Cultural Studies Professor	
^{†} Also an alumnus of the college

== Presidents of Pomona College ==
From 1888 to 1890, trustee Charles B. Sumner was the college's "financial agent with supervisory authority", and assumed many of the duties of a president. The subsequent presidents are:

#	Image	Name	Term start	Term end	Academic expertise	Ref.
1		Cyrus G. Baldwin	1890	1897	Congregational minister	
2		Franklin La Du Ferguson	1897	1901	Congregational minister	
3		George A. Gates	1902	1909	Congregational minister	
4		James A. Blaisdell	July 1, 1910	June 30, 1927	Congregational minister	
5		Charles K. Edmunds	July 1, 1928	June 30, 1941	Physics	
6		E. Wilson Lyon	July 1, 1941	June 30, 1969	History	
7		David Alexander	July 1, 1969	June 30, 1991	Theology	
8		Peter W. Stanley	July 1, 1991	June 30, 2003	History	
9		David W. Oxtoby	July 1, 2003	June 30, 2017	Chemistry	
10		G. Gabrielle Starr	July 1, 2017	present	Literature, neuroscience	

Baldwin
Ferguson
Gates
Blaisdell
Edmunds
Lyon
Alexander
Stanley
Oxtoby
Starr
│
1890
│
1900
│
1910
│
1920
│
1930
│
1940
│
1950
│
1960
│
1970
│
1980
│
1990
│
2000
│
2010
│
2020
Presidents of Pomona College (1887–present)

== See also ==
- List of Claremont Colleges people
