= J. William Whedbee =

American Biblical historian

J. William Whedbee (September 24, 1938 – January 22, 2004) was an American Biblical historian. He was the Nancy J. Lyon Professor of Biblical History and Literature at Pomona College in Claremont, California, where he taught for 37 years. He was succeeded by Erin M. Runions.

== Early life and education ==
Whedbee was born on September 24, 1938. He attended Westmont College, Fuller Theological Seminary, and Yale University.

== Works ==
- Isaiah & wisdom. Nashville: Abingdon Press. 1971. ISBN 0-687-19706-6. OCLC 127828.
- The Bible and the comic vision (1st ed.). Minneapolis: Fortress Press. 2002. ISBN 0-8006-3486-1. OCLC 50420637.

== Recognition ==
Whedbee won Pomona's Wig Award, the college's highest honor for teaching, five times.
