= Lise Abrams =

American cognitive psychologist

- Education: Pomona College; University of California, Los Angeles
- Scientific career
- Fields: Cognitive psychology
- Institutions: Pomona College; University of Florida

Lise Abrams is an American cognitive psychologist. She is the Peter W. Stanley Professor of Linguistics and Cognitive Science at Pomona College and also serves as the chair of Linguistics and Cognitive Science.

== Education ==
Abrams graduated from Pomona College in 1991, earning her B.A. (cum laude) with a double major in psychology and mathematics. She then attended the University of California, Los Angeles, earning an M.A. and Ph.D. in cognitive psychology, in 1992 and 1997 respectively.

== Career ==
Following her graduation, Abrams joined the faculty in the Department of Psychology at the University of Florida, where she was remained until 2018, at which time she accepted an appointment as professor at Pomona College.

Abrams conducts research on language and memory processes in younger and older adults, including tip of the tongue states, speech production and comprehension, and bilingualism. She is a fellow of the Association for Psychological Science, the American Psychological Association, and the Gerontological Society of America. She earned the Sigma Xi Young Investigator Award in 2007.
