= G. Gabrielle Starr =

President of Pomona College

Gina Gabrielle Starr
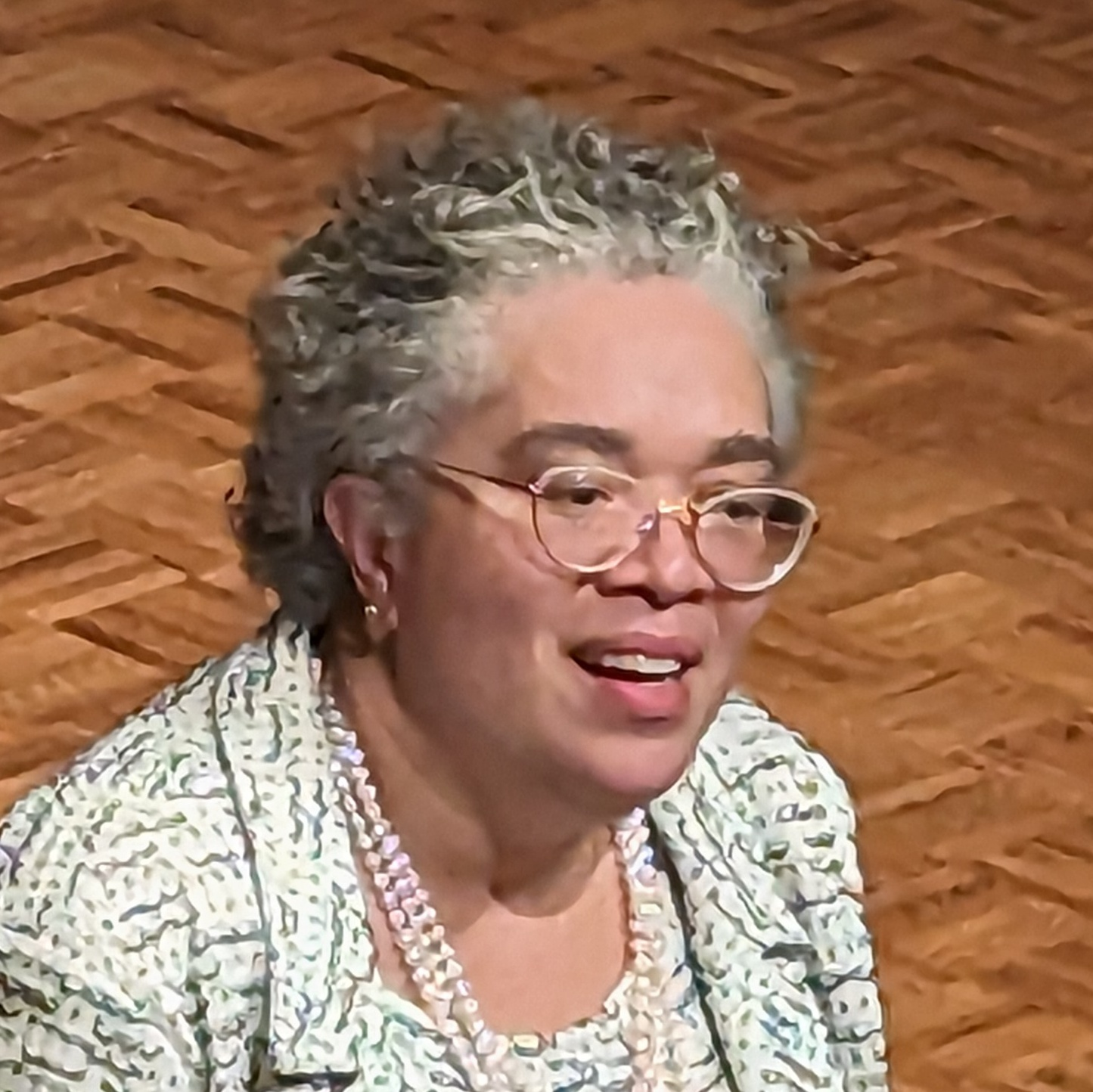
- Starr in 2023

10th President of Pomona College
- Incumbent
- Assumed office July 1, 2017
- Preceded by: David W. Oxtoby

Personal details
- Born: 1974 (age 51–52) Tallahassee, Florida, U.S.
- Spouse: John C. Harpole
- Children: 2
- Education: Emory University (BA, MA); University of St Andrews; Harvard University (PhD)
- Website: www.pomona.edu/administration/president

Academic background
- Thesis: The frame of sense: The epistolary novel and the lyric mode in eighteenth-century England (1999)
- Doctoral advisor: Leo Damrosch; James Engell; Philip Fisher

Academic work
- Discipline: English literature, neuroaesthetics
- Institutions: New York University; Pomona College

Gina Gabrielle Starr (born 1974) is an American literary scholar, neuroscientist, and academic administrator who is the 10th president of Pomona College, a liberal arts college in Claremont, California. She is known for her work on 18th-century British literature and the neuroscience of aesthetics. She is the recipient of a Guggenheim Fellowship, an NSF ADVANCE award (joint with Nava Rubin), and a New Directions Fellowship from the Mellon Foundation. From 2000 to 2017, she was on the faculty at New York University. In 2017, she became the first woman and first African-American president of Pomona College. Starr was elected a member of the American Academy of Arts and Sciences in 2020. In 2024, she was elected to the American Philosophical Society.

== Early life and education ==
Starr grew up in Tallahassee, Florida. She began college at Emory University at age 15, where she earned her bachelor's and master's degrees in women's studies in 1993. She then studied at the University of St Andrews in Scotland as a Robert T. Jones Scholar. From there, she earned a Ph.D. in English literature from Harvard University in 1999.

== Career ==
After receiving her doctorate, Starr decided to retrain in cognitive neuroscience, supported by a New Directions Fellowship awarded by the Andrew W. Mellon Foundation. She completed a postdoctoral fellowship at the California Institute of Technology, exploring techniques from cognitive neuroscience.

She joined the faculty at New York University (NYU) in 2000 and became the acting dean of the College of Arts and Science in 2011 and dean suo jure in 2013.

With Susanne Wofford and faculty at NYU, in 2015 Starr co-founded a liberal arts prison education program at Wallkill Correctional Facility in New York State. In addition, Starr, in collaboration with the Borough of Manhattan Community College, initiated a STEM preparation and transfer program, P.O.I.S.E., to provide promising students with support, mentorship, and financial access to encourage them to undertake a bachelor's degree in STEM subjects at NYU.

In 2016 she was selected to be the 10th President of Pomona College, a position she assumed on July 1, 2017. During her tenure, she presided over the college's response to the COVID-19 pandemic. She is a proponent of affirmative action. As of 2020, her yearly compensation was valued at $685,672.

On April 5, 2024, Starr had 19 pro-Palestinian demonstrators occupying her office arrested, prompting protests and condemnations as well as support. In October 2024, she unilaterally suspended 12 students who participated in a pro-Palestinian occupation of a building that included vandalism.

== Research ==
Starr's research is interdisciplinary, combining literary scholarship, empirical aesthetics, psychology, and cognitive neuroscience. Her book Feeling Beauty offered an initial model of aesthetic experience that relies on a network of interconnected neural structures. Feeling Beauty was shortlisted for the Christian Gauss Award of Phi Beta Kappa in 2014. Her most recent book, Just in Time, continues this work, proposing that the goals individuals take to aesthetic encounters combine with the cognitive demands of aesthetic objects to determine the time course of aesthetic experiences and the neural systems that underpin them.

Her research uses functional magnetic resonance imaging to understand the neural basis of aesthetic experiences, providing evidence that the default mode network is involved in the representation of aesthetic appeal.
