= Julius Taranto =

American author

- Education: Pomona College; Yale Law School
- Occupation: Author
- Website: juliustaranto.com

Julius Taranto is an American author. His 2023 debut novel, How I Won a Nobel Prize, satirized a libertarian university for people who had been cancelled.

== Biography ==
Taranto attended Pomona College and then Yale Law School, graduating in 2016. He then embarked on a career as a lawyer. He started writing his debut novel, How I Won a Nobel Prize, in 2020, and published it in 2023.

== Works ==
- How I Won a Nobel Prize. Little, Brown and Company. September 12, 2023. ISBN 9780316513074.

== Personal life ==
Taranto lives in New York City.
