= Phebe Estelle Spalding =

American writer and educator

- Oil portrait of Spalding, standing in front of Carnegie Hall
- Born: March 13, 1859
- Died: March 12, 1937 (aged 77); Pomona Cemetery and Mausoleum
- Education: Carleton College; Boston University (Ph.D)
- Occupation: Professor of English
- Parents: Benjamin P. Spalding (father); Ann Folsom (mother)

Phebe Estelle Spalding (1859 – 1937) was an American writer and educator. She was professor of English at Pomona College, and would later serve as Dean of women and its librarian.

== Biography ==
She was born in Westfield, Vermont, the third of four children of Benjamin P. Spalding and Ann Folsom. She began teaching grammar school at the age of 16, sometimes serving as principal for nearby schools. As a young adult, she moved to the Dakota Territory where she continued teaching. In 1886 at the age of 27, she received a scholarship to study at Carleton College. She graduated with a B.L. in 1889.

Spalding joined the faculty of Pomona College in 1889, becoming the only woman teacher at the facility. She was hired as a teacher of English and modern languages, but would also serve as the Dean of women at the college and as its librarian. She established the first library in Claremont with a contribution of 200 books she brought with her from Carleton College, which were added to the existing collection of 300 books. This became the basis of the Pomona College library at Sumner Hall. Spalding came to live in a house on West 5th Street that she named "Otherwhere".

During 1898–99 she took a sabbatical to travel and study in Europe, including a year spent in Britain to study Wordsworth. Her novel A Tale of Indian Hill was published in 1899. She returned to Carleton College, and was awarded an M.L. in 1890. She would work at the Harvard University Library and The British Museum before returning to Pomona College, where she became Professor of English in 1904. In 1908 she was awarded a Ph.D. from Boston University with a dissertation on the historical plays of Shakespeare. In 1911, Pomona President Blaisdell established the Phebe Estelle Spalding Professorship of English Literature in her honor, making her the first to chair the position. Spalding retired from teaching in 1927 but would continue writing for several years thereafter.

== Bibliography ==
During her career she authored 13 books and novellas, as well as articles published in professional journals and some poems. Her Patron Saints of California was published as a series of five books in 1934.

- A Tale of Indian Hill (1899)
- Womanhood in Art (1906)
- The Tahquitch maiden, a tale of the San Jacintos (1911)
- Through Nature to Eternity, A Shakespearian Meditation (1933)
- Patron Saints of California: Franciscan series (1934)
