= Roberta Hamme =

Canadian chemical oceanographer

- Education: Phd and MSc at University of Washington and BA at Pomona College
- Website: https://web.uvic.ca/~rhamme/

Roberta C. Hamme is a Canadian chemical oceanographer at the University of Victoria. She holds a Canada Research Chair in Ocean Carbon Dynamics (Tier 2).

== Education, research and career ==
She did her Phd and MSc at University of Washington and BA at Pomona College.

Previously, Hamme's research demonstrated that the 2008 eruption of the Kasatochi island volcano resulted in one of the largest phyotoplankton blooms observed in the subarctic North Pacific, covering between 1.5 and 2 million square kilometres of ocean. Hamme also noted that this phytoplankton bloom had a minor impact on carbon dioxide absorption levels as it absorbed only 0.01 petagrams of carbon. Researchers later linked this bloom to an increase in the sockeye salmon population in British Columbia.

Hamme is now an associate professor in the School of Earth and Ocean Science at the University of Victoria, where her lab studies air-sea exchange. She is leading a team of Canadian researchers who have received $540,000 in funding from the Advancing Climate Change Science in Canada initiative to investigate the role of the ocean in slowing down the effects of climate change, including measuring carbon dioxide absorption levels and predicting future changes in Canadian oceans.

Hamme's research has been cited over 1,000 times, and has an h-index and i10-index of 16 and 23 respectively. She was appointed as a Canada Research Chair in Ocean Carbon Dynamics (Tier 2) in 2014, which was renewed in 2019.

== Selected bibliography ==
- Hamme, Roberta C., and Steven R. Emerson. "The solubility of neon, nitrogen and argon in distilled water and seawater." Deep Sea Research Part I: Oceanographic Research Papers 51, no. 11 (2004): 1517-1528.
- Hamme, Roberta C., Peter W. Webley, William R. Crawford, Frank A. Whitney, Michael D. DeGrandpre, Steven R. Emerson, Charles C. Eriksen et al. "Volcanic ash fuels anomalous plankton bloom in subarctic northeast Pacific." Geophysical Research Letters 37, no. 19 (2010).
- Cassar, Nicolas, Bruce A. Barnett, Michael L. Bender, Jan Kaiser, Roberta C. Hamme, and Bronte Tilbrook. "Continuous high-frequency dissolved O2/Ar measurements by equilibrator inlet mass spectrometry." Analytical chemistry 81, no. 5 (2009): 1855-1864.
- Hamme, Roberta C., and Steven R. Emerson. "Constraining bubble dynamics and mixing with dissolved gases: Implications for productivity measurements by oxygen mass balance." Journal of Marine Research 64, no. 1 (2006): 73-95.
- Hamme, Roberta C., and Steven R. Emerson. "Mechanisms controlling the global oceanic distribution of the inert gases argon, nitrogen and neon." Geophysical Research Letters 29, no. 23 (2002): 35-1.
