= Larissa Rudova =

Russian studies scholar

Larissa V. Rudova is a Russian studies scholar. She is the Yale B. and Lucille D. Griffith Professor of Modern Languages and Professor of German and Russian at Pomona College in Claremont, California.

== Books ==
- With Balina, Marina, eds. (2011). 978-0-415-75979-3. London: Routledge. ISBN 978-0-415-75979-3.
- Understanding Boris Pasternak. Columbia, South Carolina: University of South Carolina Press. 1997. ISBN 1-57003-143-6.
- Rudova, Larissa (1994). Pasternak's Early Fiction and the Cultural Vanguard. New York: Peter Lang. ISBN 0-8204-2273-8.
