= David Alexander (college president) =

University administrator (1932 – 2010)

7th President of Pomona College
- In office July 1, 1969 – July 1, 1991
- Preceded by: E. Wilson Lyon
- Succeeded by: Peter W. Stanley

16th President of Rhodes College
- In office 1965–1969
- Preceded by: Peyton Nalle Rhodes
- Succeeded by: William L. Bowden

Personal details
- Born: John David Alexander; October 18, 1932 Springfield, Tennessee
- Died: July 25, 2010 (aged 77) Claremont, California
- Spouse: Catharine C. Alexander
- Children: 3, including Julia
- Education: Southwestern at Memphis College; Christ Church, Oxford
- Profession: Academic

John David Alexander CBE (October 18, 1932 – July 25, 2010) was an American academic who served as president of Pomona College during a period of time where he led a major expansion of the school, and served as US National Secretary for the Rhodes Trust, overseeing the selection process for recipients of the Rhodes Scholarship from the United States.

== Early life and education ==
Alexander was born on October 18, 1932, in Springfield, Tennessee. He was raised in Princeton, Kentucky and graduated from Southwestern at Memphis College, now known as Rhodes College, graduating Phi Beta Kappa and with honors in Greek language, and then attended Louisville Presbyterian Theological Seminary. He was selected as a Rhodes Scholar in 1954 and was awarded a doctorate in theology from Christ Church, Oxford, where he studied Greek, Hebrew and church history.

== Career ==
After returning to the United States, he taught at San Francisco Theological Seminary. He became the president of Southwestern at Memphis in 1965, where he desegregated the college's network of fraternities and sororities. At 33, Alexander was one of the youngest college presidents in the United States and was the first alumnus to serve in the position.

He was named president of Pomona College on January 13, 1969. During his more than two decades at the nationally ranked liberal arts college, he oversaw a major expansion in the school's endowment from $24 million to $296 million and the construction of numerous new buildings on its campus in Claremont, California. He emphasized an element of formality in the college's academic life.

He served as U.S. National Secretary to the Rhodes Trust from 1981 to 1998. The Rhodes Trust administers Rhodes Scholarships, which are the oldest and arguably the most prestigious international scholarships in the world. David was responsible for overseeing the selection of candidates for the 32 annual spots designated for residents of the United States to study at the University of Oxford under which students may study any full-time postgraduate course offered by the university. Women first became eligible to be recognized as Rhodes Scholars in 1976 and during his tenure Alexander oversaw efforts to increase the number of scholarships applied for by and awarded to women. The annual selection process overseen by Alexander involved contacting officials at as many as 800 colleges and universities across the country. In 1992, for the first time, half of the Rhodes Scholarships awarded were granted to women. He was designated as a Commander of the Order of the British Empire in 1998 by Queen Elizabeth II for his service to Oxford and was elected as a Fellow of the American Academy of Arts and Sciences in 2006.

== Later life and death ==
Alexander died from cancer at age 77 on July 25, 2010, at his home in Claremont, California.

== Personal life ==
Alexander was married to Catharine Coleman. He had two daughters and a son. His daughter Julia (1967–2025), an art historian and curator, was director of the Walters Art Museum in Maryland from 2013 to 2024.
