= Marla Stone =

American historian

Marla Stone is an American historian and expert on Italian fascism. She is a Professor of History at Occidental College, where she also serves as Department Chair. A specialist in the history of fascism and modern Italian studies, much of her scholarship has centered on Anti-communism and culture in twentieth-century Italy, including the contemporary far right in Europe.

From 2021 to 2023, she was the Andrew W. Mellon Professor in the Humanities at the American Academy in Rome. In November 2023, she was elected to the Accademia dei Lincei.

Stone earned her master's degree and PhD from Princeton University.

Stone has been a fellow at the American Academy in Rome (1995–1996), the Wolfsonian Foundation (1995), the Center for Advanced Study in the Behavioral Sciences at Stanford University (2011–2012), and the European University Institute (2017). She is a past President of the Board of the ACLU of Southern California.

== Works ==
- Stone, Marla (1998). The Patron State: Culture and Politics in Fascist Italy. Princeton University Press. ISBN 9780691059990.
- Stone, Marla (2013). The Fascist Revolution in Italy: A Brief History with Documents. Bedford St. Martin's. ISBN 9780312454159.
- Stone, Marla; Harold, James, eds. (1993). When the Wall Came Down: Responses to German Reunification. Routledge. ISBN 9780415905909.
