= Caroline Winterer =

American historian

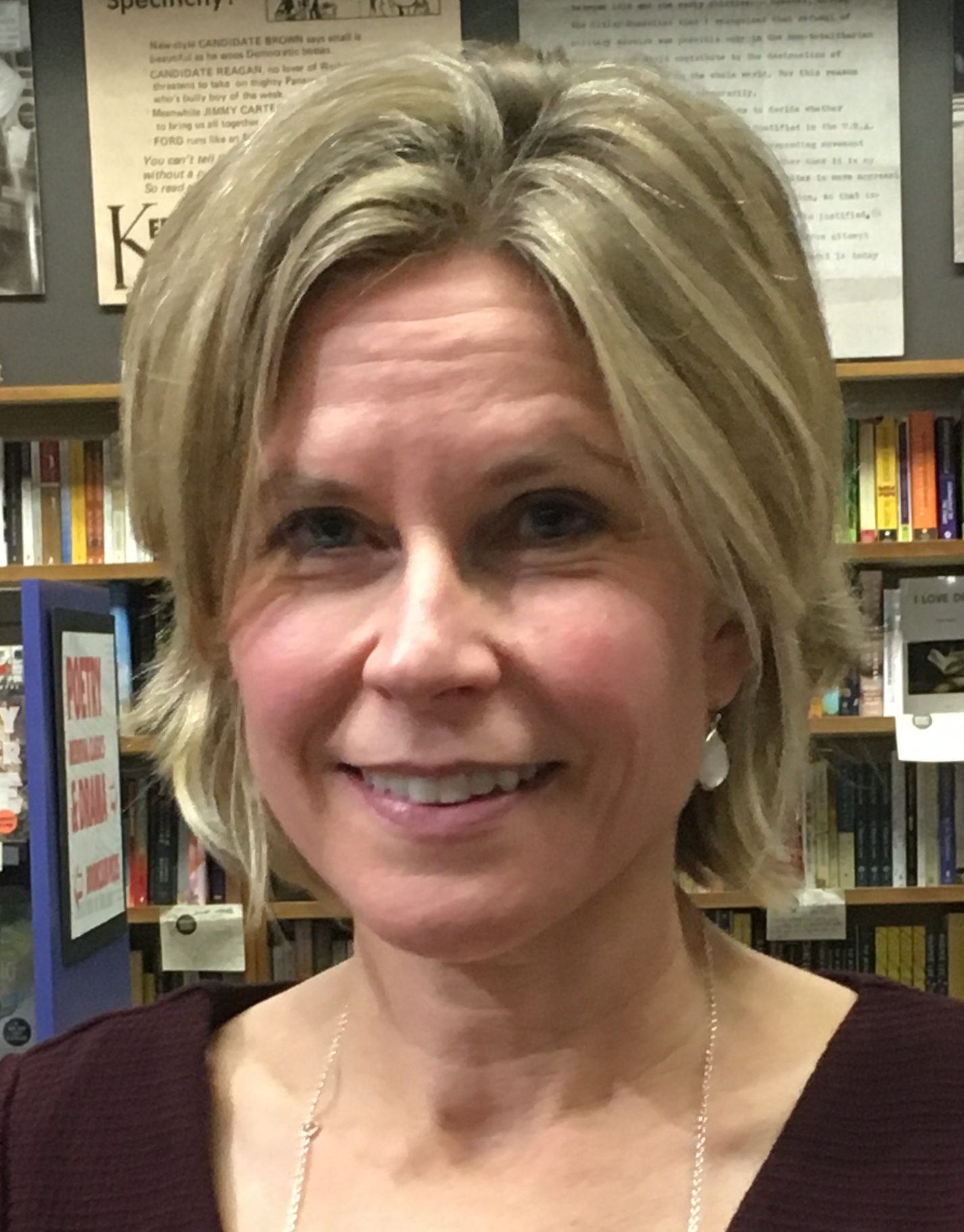
- Winterer in 2017
- Occupation: Historian

Academic background
- Education: Pomona College; University of Michigan

Academic work
- Discipline: History
- Sub-discipline: American history
- Institutions: Stanford University
- Main interests: history of ideas, political theory, and the history of science
- Website: carolinewinterer.com

Caroline Winterer is an American historian. She is the William Robertson Coe Professor of History and American Studies at Stanford University. She is also Professor, by courtesy, of Classics. From 2013 to 2019, she was Director of the Stanford Humanities Center. She received her B.A. from Pomona College and her Ph.D. from the University of Michigan.

Her expertise is American history before 1900, especially the history of ideas, political theory, and the history of science.

== Books ==
- How the New World Became Old: The Deep Time Revolution in America. Princeton: Princeton University Press, 2024.
- What America's Founders Learned from Antiquity. The Great Courses, 2024.
- Time in Maps: From the Age of Discovery to Our Digital Era .Chicago: University of Chicago Press, 2020. edited with Karen Wigen.
- American Enlightenments: Pursuing Happiness in the Age of Reason New Haven: Yale University Press, 2016, ISBN 0-3001-9257-6
- "What Was the American Enlightenment?" in The Worlds of American Intellectual History, eds. Joel Isaac, James Kloppenberg, and Jennifer Ratner-Rosenhagen, Oxford University Press, 2016 (ISBN forthcoming)
- The American Enlightenment: Treasures from the Stanford University Libraries (Stanford: Stanford University Libraries, 2011), ISBN 0-9112-2145-X
- The Mirror of Antiquity: American Women and the Classical Tradition, 1750-1900 (Ithaca: Cornell University Press, 2007; pb 2009), ISBN 0-8014-4163-3
- The Culture of Classicism: Ancient Greece and Rome in American Intellectual Life, 1780-1910 (Baltimore: Johns Hopkins University Press, 2002; pb 2004), ISBN 0-8018-6799-1

== Awards ==
- American Ingenuity Award, Smithsonian Institution, for mapping the social network of Benjamin Franklin (2013)
