= Charles K. Edmunds =

President of Pomona College

5th President of Pomona College
- In office 1928–1941
- Preceded by: James A. Blaisdell
- Succeeded by: E. Wilson Lyon

President of Lingnan University
- In office 1907–1924

Personal details
- Born: 1876 Baltimore, Maryland
- Died: January 8, 1949 (aged 72–73) Claremont, California
- Education: Johns Hopkins University
- Profession: Academic

Charles Keyser Edmunds (September 21, 1876–8 January 1949) was an American engineer and physicist who served as president of Lingnan University in Canton, China, and Pomona College in Claremont, California.

== Life and career ==
Edmunds was born in Baltimore and attended Johns Hopkins University, graduating in 1897.

He taught physics at the University of Utah during the 1898–1899 academic year, and subsequently moved to China to teach physics and engineering at Lingnan University in Canton, China. He became president of Lingnan in 1907, serving until 1924.

He moved back to the United States in 1928, to serve as president of Pomona College, becoming the college's first non-clergy president. During his tenure, he focused on Pomona's residential life, overseeing the construction of several dormitories and dining facilities, including Frary Dining Hall and the Clark dormitories. He also inspired a growing interest in Asian culture at the college. He retired in 1941, and later that year received the Order of Brilliant Jade from China. He died after being struck by a car while crossing Route 66 in Claremont in January 1949.

Pomona's original student center was named the Edmunds Union in his honor; it was built in 1937 and demolished in 1997. An academic building opened in 2007 was named Edmunds Hall in his honor.
