= Peter Thielke =

American philosophical historian (born 1968)

Academic background
- Education: University of California, San Diego (PhD)
- Thesis: Discursivity and its Discontents: Maimon's Challenge to Kant's Account of Cognition (1999)
- Doctoral advisor: Henry E. Allison
- Other advisor: Frederick Neuhouser

Academic work
- Era: Contemporary philosophy
- Region: Western philosophy
- School or tradition: German Idealism
- Institutions: Pomona College

Peter Graham Thielke (born 1968) is an American historian of modern philosophy who specializes in Immanuel Kant, German idealism, epistemology, and aesthetics. He is the Robert C. Denison Professor of Philosophy at Pomona College in Claremont, California.

== Early life and education ==
Thielke was born in 1968. He earned his bachelor's degree at Stanford University, his master's at the University of Pennsylvania, and his PhD at the University of California, San Diego.

== Career ==
Thielke came to Pomona College in 2001.

== Personal life ==
Thielke lives in Claremont. He is married to Sheri Pym, a federal magistrate judge. In 2003, his home was destroyed when a plane crashed into it.
