= Elmer P. Wheaton =

American aerospace and marine engineer

- Born: August 15, 1909; Elyria, Ohio
- Died: December 28, 1997 (aged 88)
- Education: Pomona College
- Engineering career
- Discipline: Aerospace; Marine
- Employers: Douglas Aircraft Company; Lockheed Missiles and Space Company

Elmer P. Wheaton (August 15, 1909 – December 28, 1997) was an American aerospace and marine engineer and executive. He was corporate vice president for engineering at Douglas Aircraft Company and vice president for research and development at the Lockheed Missiles and Space Company. He was a member of the National Academy of Engineering.

== Early life and education ==
Wheaton was born in Elyria, Ohio, on August 15, 1909, the first child of Harry and Lizzie Nicholl Wheaton. His family moved to Redlands, California, when he was three. He was sick for much of his childhood, but insisted on earning money as a paperboy. In high school, he enjoyed physics classes.

For college, Wheaton enrolled at Pomona College in Claremont, California, where he majored in physics, discovered marine engineering at the college's Marine Laboratory in Laguna Beach, and was mentored by Roland Tileston.

== Career ==
After graduating in 1933, in the middle of the Great Depression, Wheaton married and worked on sound recordings for Columbia Pictures. The next year, he joined the Douglas Aircraft Company as a soundproofer on Douglas DC-2 aircraft. He worked his way up the corporate ladder, eventually becoming corporate vice president for engineering, the company's top engineering role, in 1961.

In 1962, Wheaton became vice president for research and development at the Lockheed Missiles and Space Company, a division of Lockheed Corporation and the developer of the Polaris missile. His employees later remembered him as a supportive but tough boss—he made them learn to scuba dive so that they would have respect for the sea.

== Later life and death ==
Wheaton retired from Lockheed in 1974. However, he continued to provide consulting at Lockheed and at Marine Development Associates, where he was an associate and director. He died on December 28, 1997.

== Personal life ==
Wheaton was an avid equestrian. An Episcopalian, he was deeply spiritual. He had two children with his wife, Martha (née Davis).

== Recognition ==
Wheaton received numerous awards for his work and was elected to the National Academy of Engineering in 1967.
