= Erin M. Runions =

American religious studies scholar

Erin M. Runions is an American religious studies scholar whose research focuses on the influence of the Bible on contemporary culture and politics. She is the Nancy J. Lyon Professor of Biblical History and Literature at Pomona College in Claremont, California, succeeding the late J. William Whedbee

== Selected works ==
- The Babylon Complex: Theopolitical Fantasies of War, Sex, and Sovereignty
- How Hysterical: Identification and Resistance in the Bible and Film
- Changing Subjects: Gender, Nation, Future in Micah
