= Fong Foo Sec =

Chinese educator

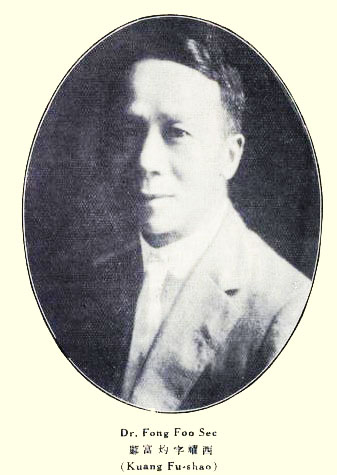
- Fong circa 1925
- Born: 1869; Xinning County, Guangdong, China
- Died: 1938 (aged 68–69); Shanghai, China
- Education: Pomona College; UC Berkeley (Bachelor's degree); Columbia University (Master's degree)
- Occupation: Educator
- Children: 5
- Relatives: Song Qi (son-in-law)

Fong Foo Sec (Note: In this Chinese name, the family name is Fong.) (Chinese: 鄺富灼, alternately romanized as Kuang Fuzhuo; 1869 – 1938) was a Chinese English-language educator and publicist.

Born in rural Xinning County, Guangdong, China, he emigrated to the United States at age 13. He encountered virulent Sinophobia and worked as a cook for a family in Sacramento, California, before becoming involved in The Salvation Army and converting to Christianity. He enrolled at Pomona College's preparatory school in 1897, becoming the college's first Asian student. He transferred to UC Berkeley in 1901, and after completing his Bachelor of Letters there, earned a Master of Arts from Teachers College, Columbia University.

Following graduation, he returned to China, and was offered a government position after earning a jinshi degree in the imperial examination. Declining, he instead became the English department editor of The Commercial Press in Shanghai, a position he held through his retirement. In this role, he translated numerous English works into Chinese, which were used widely throughout the country's education system. He died in 1931, aged 68.

== Early life in China ==
Fong was born in Xinning County, Guangdong, China, in 1869. He entered a private primary school in his home village when he was eight years of age. His father was a farmer and Fong was one of eight children.

== Education in the United States ==
In 1882, accompanied by neighbor villagers Fong embarked for the United States. The steamer that took him to America was the SS China. Through the recommendation of an American family, he obtained work and his weekly wage was one dollar. Being anxious to acquire a knowledge of the English language, Fong entered a night school. A Chinese Christian pastor, Chin Toy, took an interest in him and assisted him materially. He soon became a Christian. The Salvation Army was at that time active on the Western coast of America and Fong became an enthusiastic worker. He soon left Sacramento and went to San Francisco, where he underwent a course of training for six months. He travelled up and down the Pacific Coast in the interest of the Army and was afterwards assigned to duties at its headquarters in San Francisco. He took a course in shorthand and typewriting and later obtained a position as stenographer to the Chief Officer of the Salvation Army on the Pacific Coast. He remained with the Salvation Army from 1885 to 1893. In 1897 he entered Pomona College, one of the leading institutions of learning in California and supported himself by working about the college campus. Altogether five years were spent in Pomona College, where he did the high school work and spent his freshman year. From Pomona he went to the University of California and after a study of three years he obtained the degree of Bachelor of Letters, in 1905. Having obtained a scholarship at Teachers College, Columbia University, Fong proceeded to that university to specialize in English and education for one year, at the end of which time the degrees of Master of Arts and Master of Education were conferred upon him.

== Career in China ==
After graduation, he was recommended to Cen Chunxuan, Governor of Guangdong and Guangxi, by Liang Cheng, the Chinese Ambassador to the United States, and in the summer of 1906 Fong was appointed professor of English in the College of Foreign Languages and Provincial College in Canton. On his return to Canton Fong found his parents still living. He taught school for one year at the Guangzhou Dialect School and the Guangdong-Guangzhou Higher School and in the autumn of 1907 went to Beijing where he competed in an examination for returned students and won the degree of jinshi which was equivalent to the degree of Doctor of Literature. After passing the examination, Fong was given an appointment in the Ministry of Communications; however, he had no inclination for official life, so in April 1908, at the invitation of Zhang Yuanji, he became editor-in-chief of the English editorial department of The Commercial Press in Shanghai. Fong wrote a number of textbooks specially adapted to the needs of Chinese students of English, including Language Lessons, A Classroom Conversation Book, Elementary and Intermediate Composition, and Stories from Shakespeare. In raising the standard of the English books published by the Commercial Press, Fong made his chief contribution to educational development in China. In 1922, Pomona College awarded him an honorary Doctor of Laws degree, the second such bestowment in its history. Notwithstanding his busy life he has found time for work of social usefulness, and held numerous offices in a social capacity, including Chairman (for many years) of the National Committee of the Y. M. C. A. of China, member of committee of management of the Institution for the Chinese Blind, director of the Shanghai Chinese Y. M. C. A., member of Field Board of Shangtung Christian University, honorary president of Nanyang Commercial Academy, member of the executive committee of the China Christian Educational Association, member of the executive committee of the Forestry Fund, and Elder of the Cantonese Union Church in Shanghai. In 1920, the Pacific Society was established, and he served as its first director.

== Personal life ==
Fong had four daughters and one son. His son-in-law, Song Qi, was a writer and translator.

== Retirement, death, and legacy ==
Around 1929, he retired because of a conflict with Wang Yun-wu, the director of the Compilation Institute. Fong died of disease in 1938.
