= Tamily Weissman =

Neurobiology professor

Tamily Weissman-Unni (born January 21, 1971) is a neurobiology professor at Lewis and Clark College in Portland, Oregon. She has published numerous studies on brain development and her current research focuses on formation of cerebellar circuits. Additionally, she has won several scientific imaging competitions for her striking multi-color pictures of the brain.

== Personal background and education ==
Tamily was born in England but immigrated with her family to Seattle, Washington, in her early childhood. She went on to earn a degree in psychology from Pomona College (1992) and a PhD in neurobiology from Columbia University (2004). Together with Dr. Jeff W. Lichtman, Dr. Jean Livet, Dr. Josh R. Sanes, and others at Harvard University she helped develop the 'Brainbow' transgenic mouse line.
