= Soma Mei Sheng Frazier =

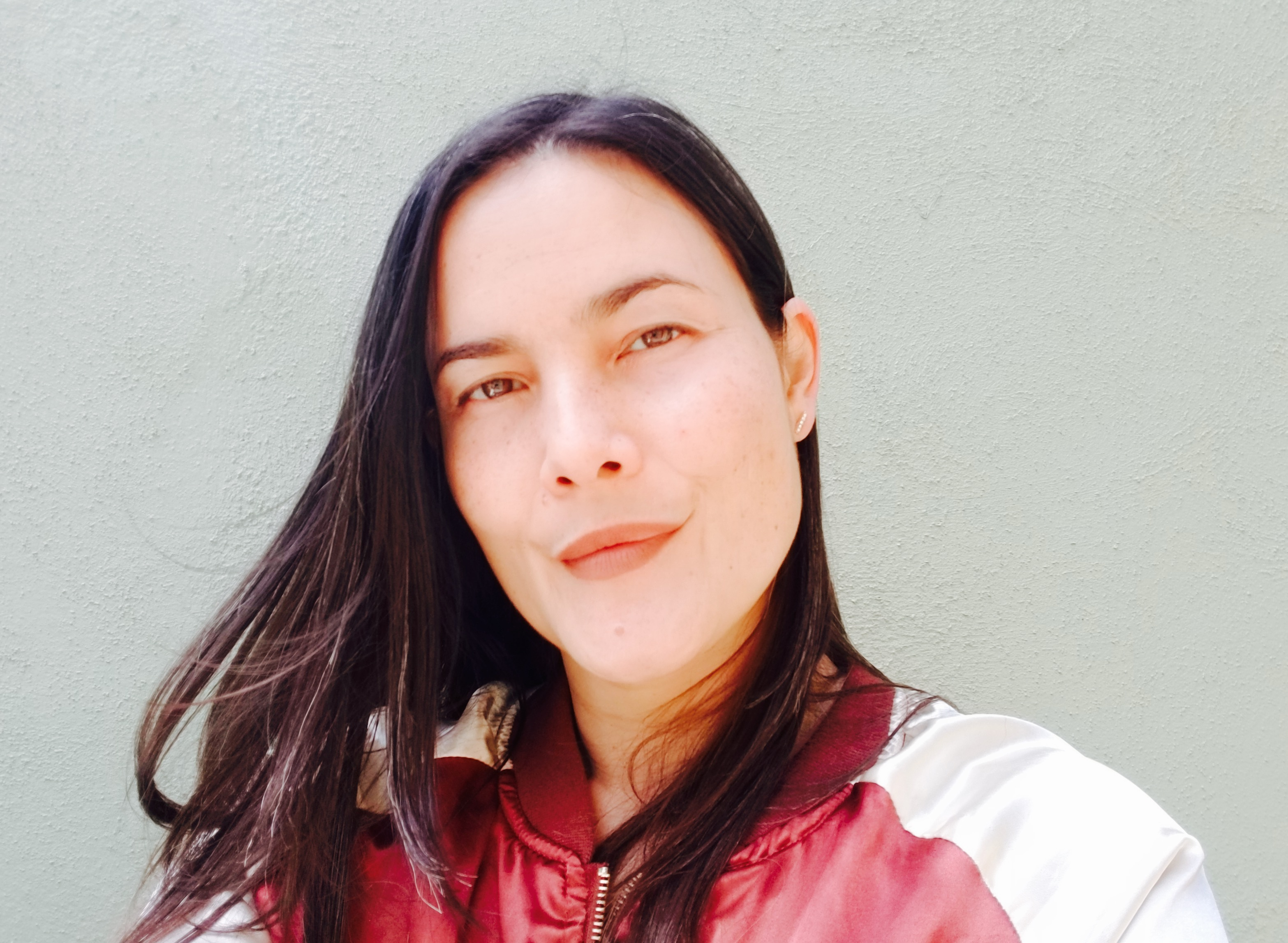
Author Soma Mei Sheng Frazier, 2018, San Francisco Bay Area

Soma Mei Sheng Frazier is a biracial American author living in the Syracuse region and serving as a professor at the State University of New York at Oswego, where she founded Subnivean (an internationally-read literary publication that was named a 2021 CLMP Firecracker Awards finalist in its first year of operation). Frazier’s debut novel, Off the Books, is forthcoming from Henry Holt & Co. (Macmillan) in July 2024. Until 2019, she lived in the San Francisco Bay Area, where she served as a 2017 San Francisco Library Laureate. Her award-winning fiction chapbooks, Don't Give Up on Alan Greenspan (CutBank), Salve (Nomadic Press) and Collateral Damage: A Triptych (Ropewalk Press), earned praise from Daniel Handler (Lemony Snicket), Nikki Giovanni, Antonya Nelson, Sarah Shun-lien Bynum, Molly Giles, Michelle Tea and others. Collateral Damage: A Triptych won the 2013 RopeWalk Press Editor's Fiction Chapbook Contest although, per Frazier's website, the first story in the collection was truncated by the publisher.

Frazier's writing has placed in literary competitions offered by HBO, Zoetrope: All-Story, the Mississippi Review and more. Her online work has been published by Hyphen Magazine, Eclectica Magazine, Carve Magazine, Eleven Eleven and Kore Press, and she has been interviewed by CBS, SF Weekly and Women's Quarterly Conversation, among others. After earning first place in a contest, Frazier wrote this brief article on literary craft. She has earned multiple Pushcart Prize nominations, and one of her award-winning short fiction pieces, which first appeared in Carve Magazine, was named a Notable Story by the story South Million Writers Award authors. Print work is available in Glimmer Train, issue 96, and ZYZZYVA, issue 106. She acts as final judge of the Tom Howard/Margaret Reid Poetry Contest.

Frazier serves as a Creative Writing professor at SUNY Oswego. Previously, she served as Assistant Professor and Chair at Cogswell College and as Associate Director of Foundation and Government Support at KQED, a San Francisco Bay Area public media source, and held the dual role of Literary Arts Chair and Director of Institutional Advancement at Oakland School for the Arts where she served as Senior Editor for Enizagam, a publication that she overhauled in 2011 to become the first nationally known literary journal written by and for adults, but published by an urban secondary school staff. Her most recent literary project is Subnivean, a multimedia publication that she launched with her undergraduate student staff at SUNY Oswego.
