= E. Wilson Lyon =

American diplomatic historian (1905–1989)

6th President of Pomona College
- In office July 1, 1941 – July 1, 1969
- Preceded by: Charles K. Edmunds
- Succeeded by: David Alexander

Personal details
- Born: Elijah Wilson Lyon; January 6, 1905 Heidelberg, Mississippi
- Died: March 4, 1989 (aged 84) Pomona, California
- Spouse: Carolyn Lyon
- Children: 2
- Education: University of Mississippi; St John's College, Oxford
- Profession: Academic

Elijah Wilson Lyon (1905–1989) was an American diplomatic historian who was the sixth president of Pomona College from 1941 to 1969. Born in Mississippi, he studied at the University of Mississippi and Colgate University, and was a Rhodes Scholar at Oxford University. During his tenure at Pomona, he guided the college through a transformational and turbulent period, and he is credited with helping shape it into a leading liberal arts institution. After his retirement, he wrote a history of the college, published in 1977.

== Early life and career ==
Elijah Wilson Lyon was born in Heidelberg, Mississippi, in 1905. Lyon had planned on becoming a journalist, but history drew his interest later on in life. Lyon attended the University of Mississippi. As a result of his academic achievements, his tenure as senior class president, and editorship of the college newspaper, he won a Rhodes Scholarship to St. John's College, Oxford. When he returned to the United States, he became an assistant professor of history at Louisiana Polytechnic Institute, then at Colgate University. He was named head of the history department in 1934 at Colgate.

== Pomona College presidency ==
In 1941, Lyon was appointed president of Pomona College. He helped shape Pomona into a leading liberal arts institution. Lyon's presidency was turbulent as it extended from the Second World War to Vietnam. He led Pomona through the birth of the civil rights movement and the assassinations of John F. Kennedy, Martin Luther King Jr. and Robert F. Kennedy. At Pomona, students protested about many college and national issues. During his term, the school's endowment rose from $3.5 million to over $22 million and the student body grew from 790 to 1,200.

Following his retirement, he wrote a history of the college, published in 1977 as The History of Pomona College, 1887–1969. The account was praised by critics for its comprehensiveness and objectivity.
