= Catherine Sugar =

American biostatistician

Catherine Ann Sugar is an American biostatistician at the University of California, Los Angeles, where she is Professor in Residence in the Departments of Biostatistics, Statistics and Psychiatry and director of the biostatistics core for the Semel Institute for Neuroscience and Human Behavior. Her research concerns cluster analysis, covariance, and the applications of statistics in medicine and psychiatry.

Sugar graduated from Pomona College in 1992. She earned a master's degree in mathematics from Stanford University in 1994, and a Ph.D. in statistics from Stanford in 1998, under the supervision of Richard Olshen. Prior to joining the UCLA faculty, Sugar worked in the Department of Information and Operations Management of the Marshall School of Business at the University of Southern California, with a joint appointment in the USC School of Pharmacy.

In 2015 she was elected as a Fellow of the American Statistical Association "for outstanding methodological contributions in cluster analysis and functional data analysis; for extraordinary accomplishment in teaching and mentoring; for outstanding leadership in integrating statistical methods into mental health research; and for exemplary service to the profession."
