= Martha Andresen Wilder =

American scholar of Renaissance literature

Martha Elizabeth Andresen Wilder (1944 – 2018) was an American scholar of Renaissance literature. She taught at Pomona College, where she was the Phebe Estelle Spalding Professor of English.
