= Lynn Walford =

American writer

Lynn Walford is a Los Angeles writer, editor, copywriter and author. Her work includes numerous news stories, feature articles, brochures, online media, magazine articles and a book. Her most recent feature articles focus on connected cars, technology, wireless, financial technology, mobile content, and business.

Walford graduated from Pomona College and is the former treasurer of The Book Publicists of Southern California. She was formerly on the board of directors of the Independent Writers of Southern California. She presently runs Freelance Writer Now and writes freelance articles for major automotive technology publications.

== Bibliography ==
- AUTO Connected Car News: as executive editor of AUTO Connected Car News, Walford is best known for her coverage of events and creating the Tech CARS Awards for technology innovators in the connected car space.
- Auto Futures from DMA Media, Lynn Walford as contributing editor has contributed a multitude of articles. including articles about batteries and the future of automotive. She interviewed Jay Leno and other important auto futurists. Why the Future is Electric, Transforming Personal Mobility: InMotion USA's Rose Song Wang and many more.
- GearBrain: How to Track Employees and Teens
- AUTO Connected Car - Executive Editor
- Cars.com: Self-Installing Robotic Infant Seat, How to Use a Backup Camera Correctly, Nissan Shutters Leaf App After Remote Hacking, Monitoring Devices Allow Parents to Keep Eye on Teen Driving.
- Yahoo Autos: How Can I Play Music from My Phone in the car without Bluetooth or an Input?, Why Does It Seem Like I Can't Trust Car Dealers?, Can I Drive on Bald Tires?, Which Kid Should I Stick in the Middle Seat? Yahoo Autos Question of the Day Author
- Motor Matters Tech Out My New Ride: Author
- Automotive IT News, Author of car tech articles]
- TechHive Car Tech Author
- Wireless and Mobile News - Executive Editor
- Make Money with Your PC, Ten Speed Press, 1994.
- Wireless Week - Gesture Technology Article
- ATM Marketplace
- Digital Signage Today
- Mobile Content Writers
- ISO&Agent
- Investor's Business Daily (1998–2002)
- The Los Angeles Times
- Success
- Compute
- The Office
- PC Laptop
- HomePC
- FamilyPC
- New Age Journal
- Income Opportunities

== Awards ==
Lynn Walford was awarded the honor of Advanced Communicator Gold by Toastmasters International in 2015.

- Walford wrote the first-prize winning entry for Consumer Electronics Show Best of CES 2004.
- She also the winner of the Alameda Writers Group "25 Words or Less" very short writing contests 2002–2004.
