= Peter W. Stanley =

President of Pomona College

8th President of Pomona College
- In office 1991–2003
- Preceded by: David Alexander
- Succeeded by: David W. Oxtoby

Personal details
- Born: 1940 (age 85–86)
- Spouse: Mary-Jane Cosgrove (m. 1978; died 2020)
- Children: 1
- Education: Harvard University (BA, PhD)
- Profession: Academic

Peter William Stanley (born 1940) is an American historian and academic administrator who served as the eighth president of Pomona College. A scholar of Asian studies, his tenure at Pomona coincided with a substantial increase in the college's endowment and prestige.

== Education and career ==
Stanley earned his BA and doctorate at Harvard University. He was a Frank Knox Memorial Fellow at Jesus College, Cambridge University. He subsequently taught Asian history at the University of Illinois and Harvard, and served as the chief academic officer at Carleton College for a year. From 1979 to 1987, he directed the education and culture program at the Ford Foundation.

Stanley became president of Pomona College in 1991. During his tenure, he oversaw a number of construction projects, including most prominently the Smith Campus Center (1999), that modernized the college's facilities while restoring elements of Myron Hunt's master plan that had degraded over time. He also led the extremely successful Campaign for Pomona College from 1997 to 2002, which ultimately raised over $206 million, far exceeding its goal. Pomona's endowment increased from $364 million to $1.1. billion over the course of his presidency.

After Pomona, he became vice president of the executive search firm Isaacson.

== Personal life ==
Stanley married Mary-Jane Cosgrove in 1978, and had one daughter, Laura. After retiring from Pomona, Stanley moved with his wife to Old Saybrook, Connecticut; she died in January 2020 after 42 years of marriage.

== Legacy ==
The Peter W. Stanley Academic Quadrangle at Pomona is named in his honor. The college also awarded him an honorary degree at its 2008 commencement ceremony.

== Publications ==
- Stanley, Peter W. (1974). A Nation in the making: The Philippines and the United States, 1899-1921. Harvard University Press. ISBN 9780674436053.
