= Henry Harbinson Sinclair =

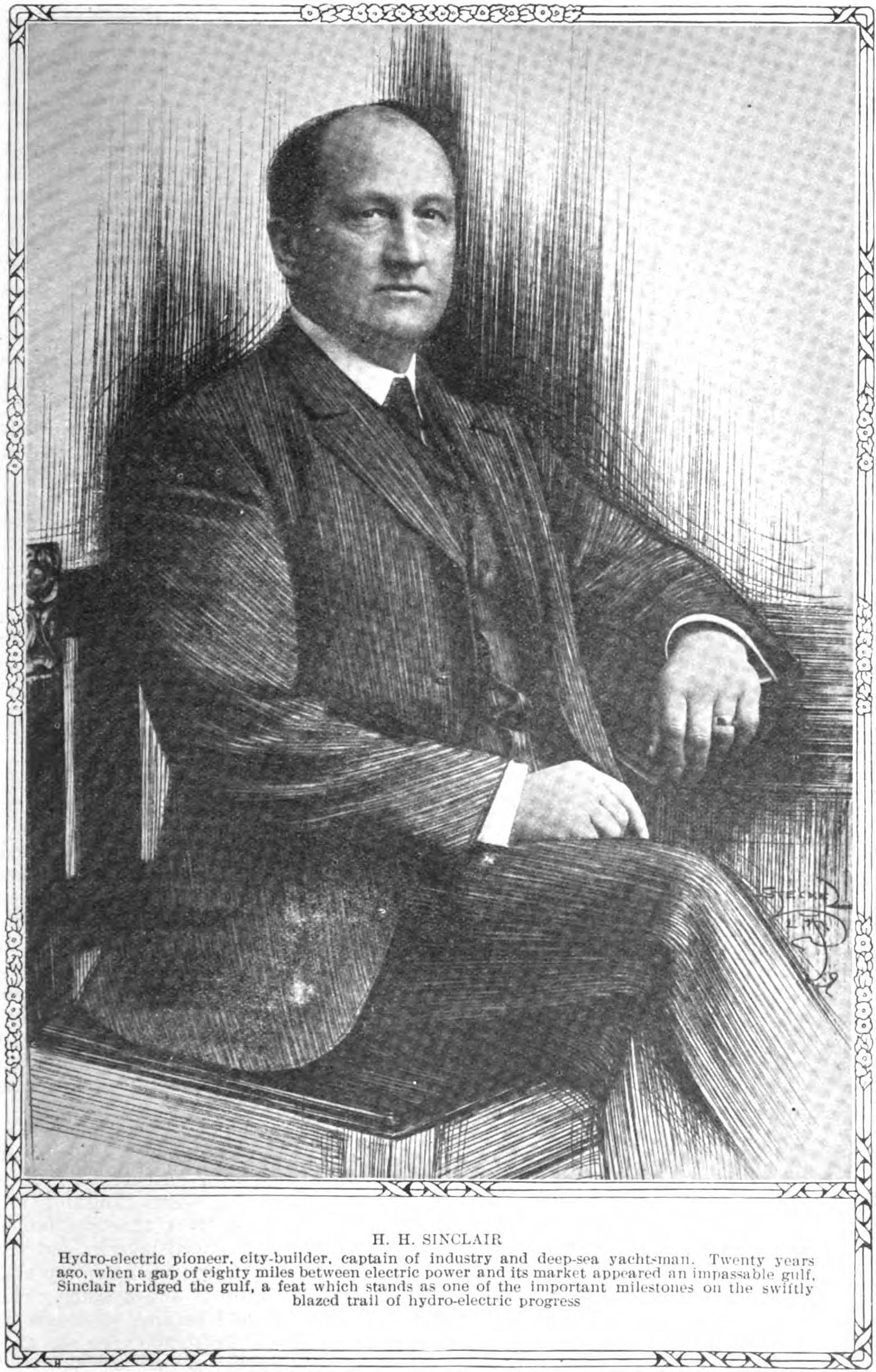

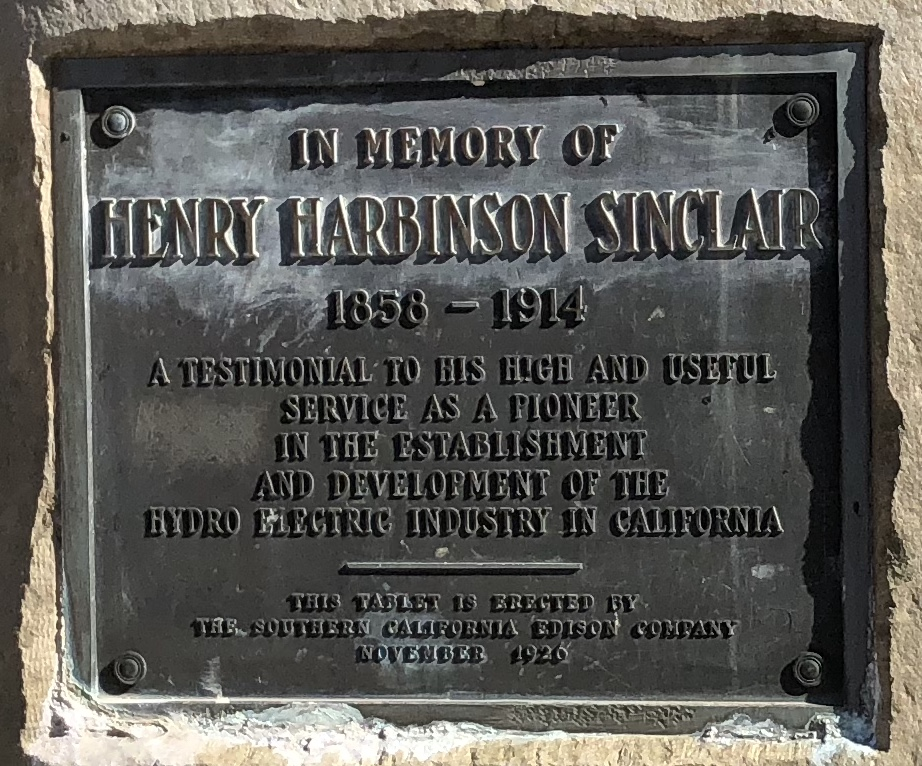
Plaque honoring Henry Harbinson Sinclair at the Mill Creek hydroelectric plant in Redlands, California

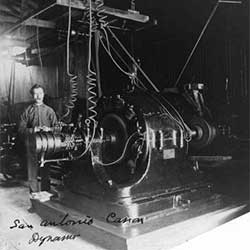
Engineer A. W. Decker with the San Antonio Dynamo in 1891 at the Pomona Water Powerplant

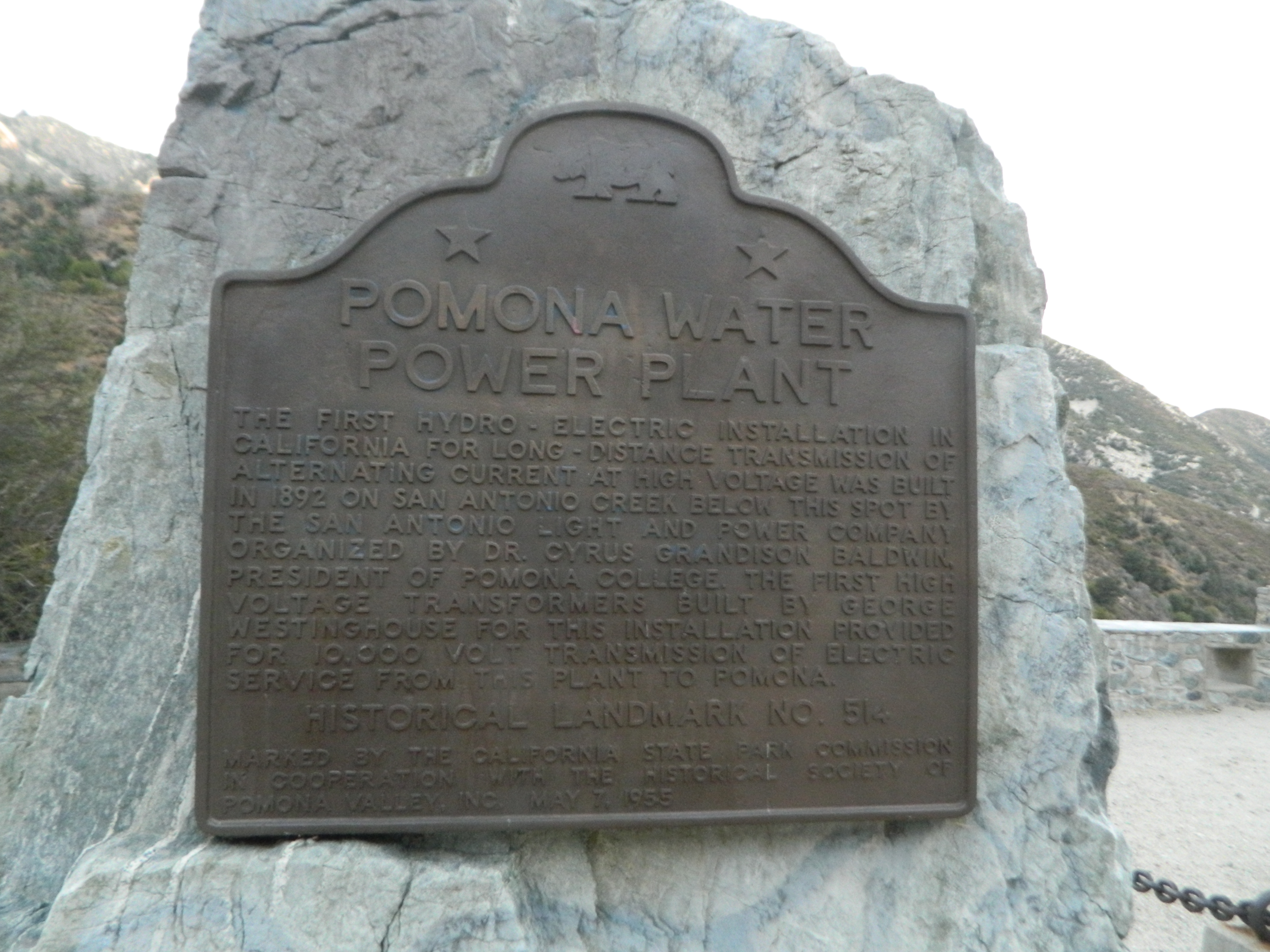
Pomona Water Powerplant marker

Henry Harbinson Sinclair (1858–1914) was a pioneer of the hydro-electric industry in the U.S. state of California.

== Biography ==
Henry Harbinson Sinclair was born in Brooklyn, New York on December 22, 1858. He was educated in public schools. At age 15, he went to sea and first visited California in 1874 after rounding Cape Horn. He was promoted to the rank of second mate by the age of 18. He enrolled into Cornell University, but left to work in the shipping business in New York, initially with Lovell & Sinclair and later as a partner in N. B. Sinclair & Son. He earned a degree in maritime law at Columbia. He relocated to Redlands, California, in 1887 for health reasons and purchased 30 acres in the Lugonia tract for citrus cultivation.

In 1892, Sinclair co‑founded the Redlands Electric Light and Power Company, which introduced the world's first three‑phase AC electrical system in the region. It later evolved into the Southern California Power Company, incorporated in 1897, where Sinclair served as president and general manager. He additionally held leadership roles in several local enterprises—including the Lugonia Water Company, South Fork Ditch Association, and the city’s street railway and hotel ventures.

He married Agnes Rowley in Brooklyn on January 4, 1882, and they had two children.

Henry Harbinson Sinclair died in Pasadena, California on September 1, 1914.

== Pomona Water Powerplant ==
The San Antonio Light and Power Company was the idea of the President of Pomona College, Dr. Cyrus Grandison Baldwin. Baldwin joined Henry Harbinson Sinclair in starting San Antonio Light and Power Company. A.W. Decker was hired to be the chief engineer of the project. Decker had been train in the use of AC power. George Westinghouse's company, Westinghouse Electric Corporation built the high-voltage transformers need to increase the power plants voltage to 10,000 volts for the long-distance power lines that fed the city of Pomona 14 miles a way. The system was so successful that a 29-mile line was add to fed power to San Bernardino, California. The San Antonio Light and Power Company's Pomona Water Powerplant is oldest AC power plant in California feeding electricity to the Pomona and the San Gabriel Valley, built in 1892. The Pomona Water Power Plant was designated a California Historic Landmark (No.514) on November 25, 1953. The Pomona Water Power Plant was built by the San Antonio Light and Power Company. The Pomona Water Power Plant is located near Mount Baldy Village, California in Los Angeles County on Camp Baldy Road, San Antonio Canyon.
