= Mary Sumner Benson =

American historian (1903–1988)

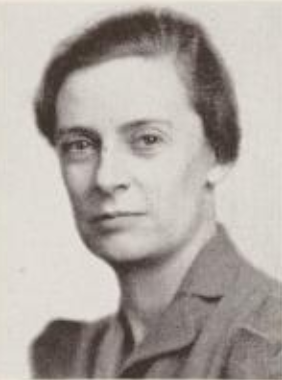
- Mary Sumner Benson, from the 1947 yearbook of Milwaukee-Downer College
- Born: April 6, 1903; New York, New York, U.S.
- Died: September 8, 1988 (age 85); South Hadley, Massachusetts, U.S.
- Occupations: Historian, college professor
- Relatives: George C. S. Benson (brother); Charles Burt Sumner (grandfather)

Mary Sumner Benson (April 6, 1903 – September 8, 1988) was an American historian and college professor, author of Women in Eighteenth-Century America (1935). She taught at Mount Holyoke College from 1952 to 1968.

== Early life and education ==
Benson was born in New York City and raised in California, the daughter of Eugene Huntington Benson and Helen Thais Sumner Benson. Her father was an Episcopal priest. Her grandfather was Charles Burt Sumner, and her brother George C. S. Benson was the first president of Claremont McKenna College. She graduated from Pomona College in 1923, and earned her master's degree from Columbia University in 1930. She completed doctoral studies at Columbia in 1935. She was a member of Phi Beta Kappa.

== Career ==
Benson's 1935 book based on her dissertation, Women in Eighteenth-Century America, was described by the Times of London as "a solid and documented work that happily escapes dullness." She taught at Lindenwood College in the 1930s, and at Milwaukee-Downer College in the 1940s. She was a professor at Mount Holyoke College from 1952 to 1968, and was chair of the history department there from 1958 to 1964. She was a delegate to the International Federation of University Women meetings in the United States, England, France, Finland, Australia, and Mexico.

== Publications ==
- Women in Eighteenth-Century America: A Study of Opinion and Social Usage (1935)

In addition to her 1935 book, Benson wrote book reviews for the Mississippi Valley Historical Review, and for Far Eastern Quarterly and its successor, The Journal of Asian Studies. Her 1935 book was reissued in 1966.

== Personal life and legacy ==
Benson traveled with her longtime colleague Meribeth E. Cameron to Greece in 1964. She died in 1988, at the age of 85, in South Hadley, Massachusetts. Her papers are in the Mount Holyoke College Archives.
