= Pomona Water Powerplant =

California Historic Landmark

Pomona Water Power Plant
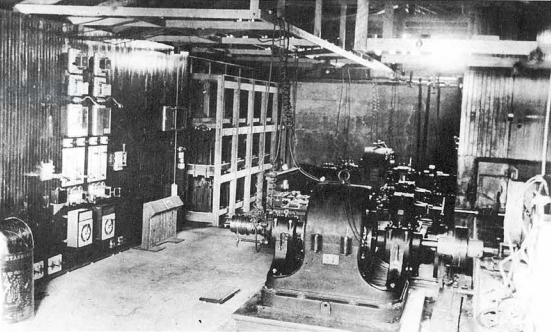
- The Pomona Water Powerplant, c. 1892

- Location within the Los Angeles metropolitan area
- 34.21598°N 117.66936°W
- Location: San Antonio Canyon, California

History
- Built: 1892

California Historical Landmark
- Designated: Nov. 25, 1953
- Reference no.: 514

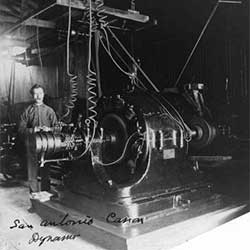
Engineer A. W. Decker with the San Antonio Dynamo in 1891 at the Pomona Water Powerplant

The Pomona Water Power Plant, built in 1892, was the first AC power plant in California. It fed electricity to the Pomona Valley, and was designated a California Historic Landmark (No.514) on November 25, 1953.

== Description ==
The Pomona Water Power Plant was built by the San Antonio Light and Power Company. The Pomona Water Power Plant is located near Mount Baldy Village, California in Los Angeles County on Camp Baldy Road, San Antonio Canyon. Using alternating current the hydroelectric power plant was able to send AC power over long distance power lines at very high voltages. San Antonio Creek was used as the power source for the one phase dynamo alternator's power. The system was unlike Thomas Edison's low voltage Electric power distribution system, started in 1882, that could not use long-distance power lines. San Antonio Light and Power Company was the idea of the first president of Pomona College, Dr. Cyrus Grandison Baldwin. Baldwin joined businessman Henry Harbison Sinclair in starting San Antonio Light and Power Company. A.W. Decker was hired to be the chief engineer of the project. Decker had been train in the use of AC power and worked on the Mount Lowe Railway, above Pasadena. George Westinghouse's company, Westinghouse Electric Corporation built the high-voltage transformers need to increase the power plants voltage to 10,000 volts for the long-distance power lines that fed the city of Pomona 14 miles a way. The system started on Nov. 28, 1892, was so successful that a 29-mile line was add to fed power to San Bernardino, California. The San Bernardino power line was at the time the world's record for long-distance commercial electric transmission. Pomona Water Powerplant worked great, but Southern California rain and snow, the source of the power, is not guaranteed each year. The location of the power plant was not in place where a dam to store water for dry period could be built. As such, the power plant was not successful in future years. A.W. Decker's next project was at the Mill Creek project run by the Redlands Electric. There he used a system of three-phase power that was more efficient. It went on line on Sept. 7, 1893.

== Marker ==
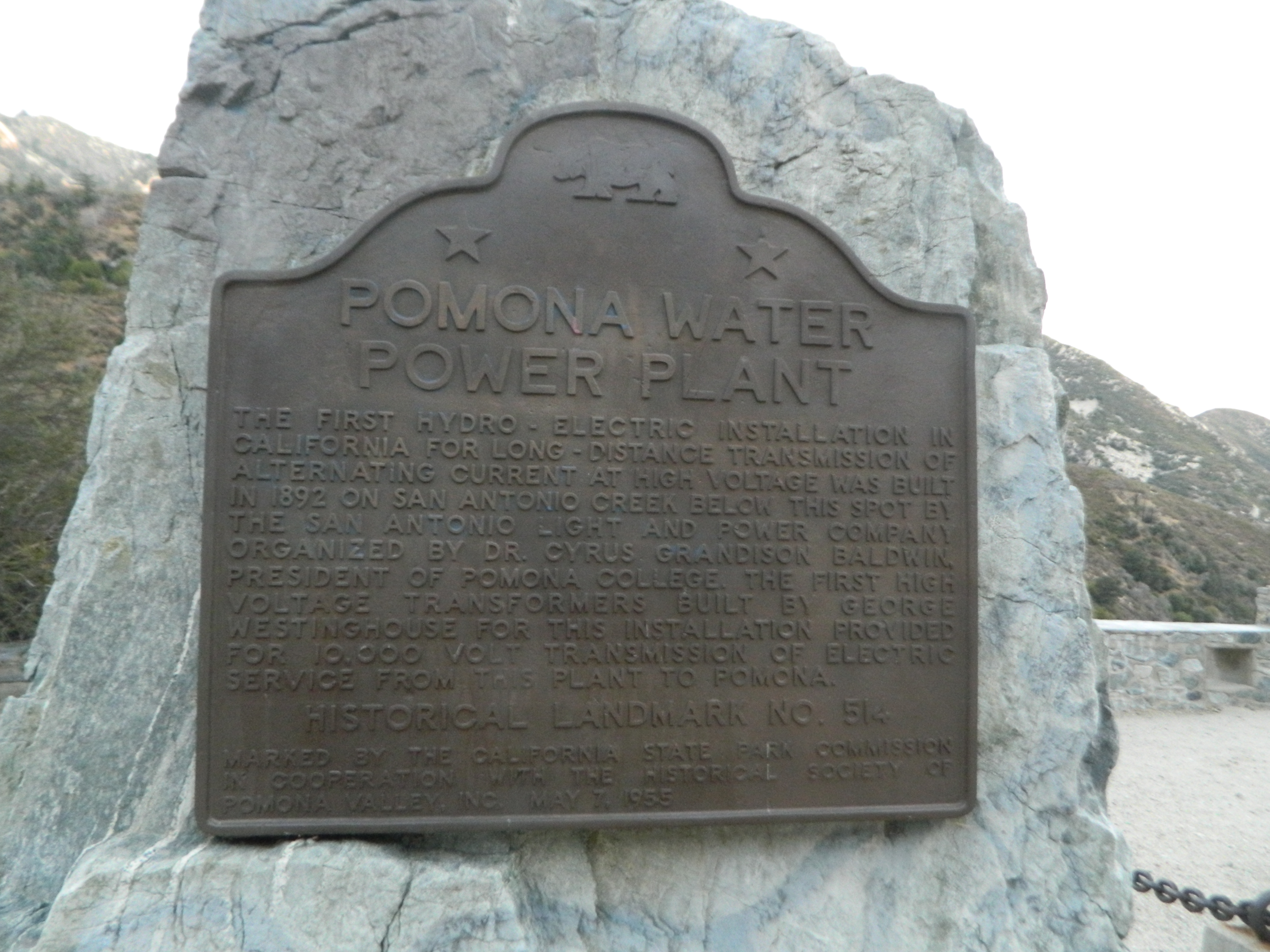
The marker on the site of the plant

Marker on the site read: (The original marker is no longer presenet)

- NO. 514 POMONA WATER POWERPLANT – The first hydroelectric installation in California for long-distance transmission of alternating current at high voltage was built in 1892 on San Antonio Creek below this spot by the San Antonio Light and Power Company organized by Dr. Cyrus Grandison Baldwin, President of Pomona College. The first high-voltage transformers built by George Westinghouse for this installation provided for transmission of 10,000 volts from the plant to Pomona.'

== See also ==
- California Historical Landmarks in Los Angeles County

https://www.redlandscommunitynews.com/history/redlands-electrifies-the-world/article_3dcef3e8-ab96-11ec-8f5a-5b8ba62a85b2.html

https://scvhistory.com/scvhistory/https://scvhistory.com/scvhistory/sce_history.htm

https://vimeo.com/channels/chswolfcast/1088520990 (skip to 2:10)
