= Heather Mac Donald =

American conservative political commentator

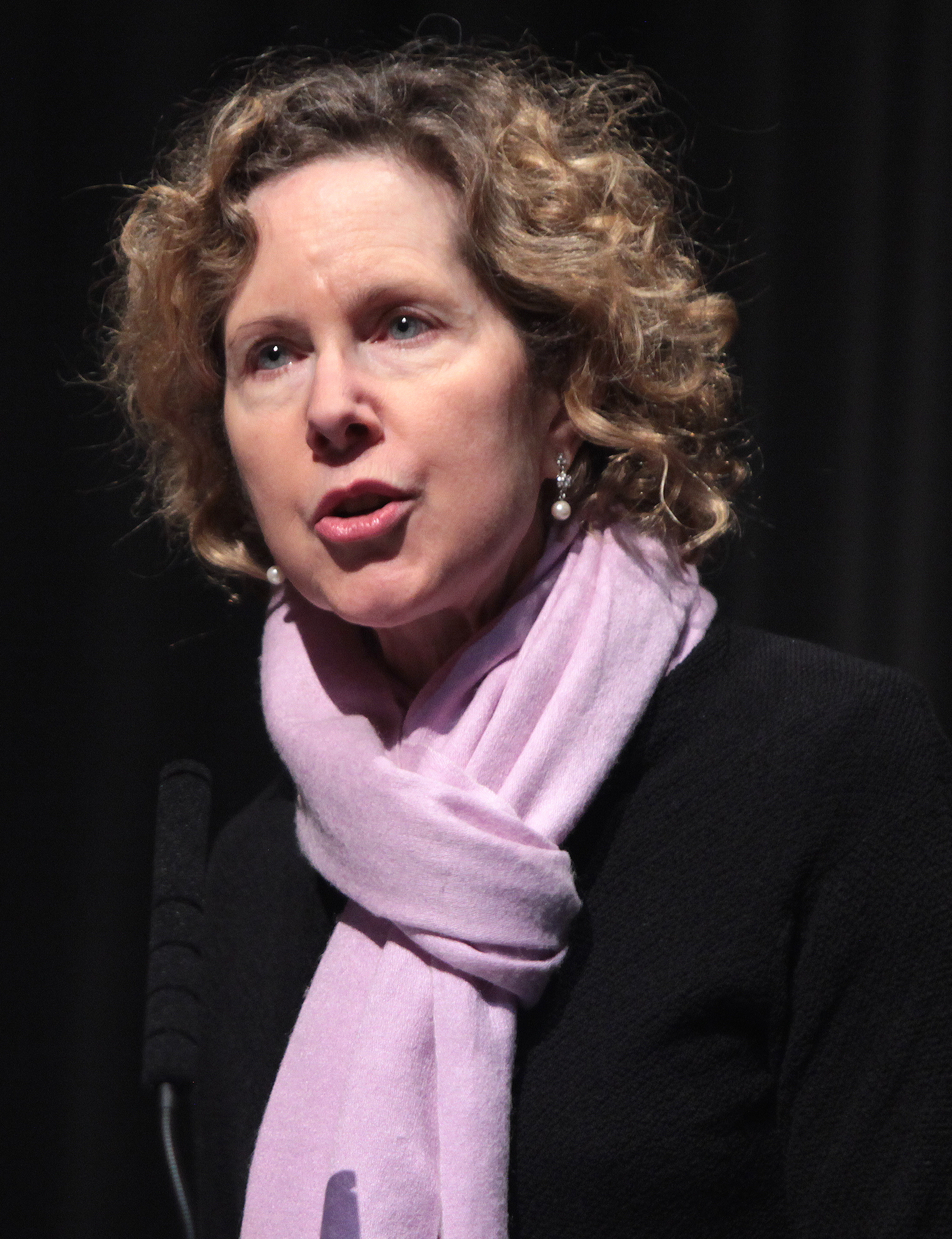
- Mac Donald in 2015
- Born: Heather Lynn MacDonald; November 23, 1956 (age 69); Los Angeles, California, U.S.
- Education: Yale University (BA); Clare College, Cambridge (MA); Stanford University (JD)
- Occupations: Essayist; author; political commentator
- Movement: American conservatism
- Awards: Bradley Prize (2005)

Heather Lynn Mac Donald (born November 23, 1956) is an American conservative political commentator, essayist, lawyer, and author. She is known for her pro-police views and opposition to criminal justice reform. She is a fellow of the Manhattan Institute think tank and a contributing editor of its City Journal.

== Early life and education ==
Heather Mac Donald grew up in Los Angeles, California. Her original family name was MacDonald; she later added the space to her surname, but recalled that it was a "bad idea".

In 1978, she graduated from Yale University with a Bachelor of Arts, summa cum laude, in English. After receiving a Mellon Fellowship from Yale, she attended Clare College, Cambridge, earning an M.A. in English. While at Cambridge she also studied in Italy through a Cambridge study grant. In 1985, she graduated with a Juris Doctor degree from Stanford Law School.

== Career ==
After graduating from Stanford, Mac Donald clerked for Judge Stephen Reinhardt of the United States Court of Appeals for the Ninth Circuit, and was subsequently an attorney-advisor in the Office of the General Counsel of the U.S. Environmental Protection Agency and a volunteer with the Natural Resources Defense Council.

She is a Thomas W. Smith Fellow of the Manhattan Institute think tank and a contributing editor of the institute's City Journal.

== Views ==
Mac Donald refers to herself as a secular conservative. She has argued that conservatism is superior to liberalism by virtue of the ideas alone, and that religion should not affect the argument and is unnecessary for conservatism. Mac Donald maintains that conservative values such as small government, self-reliance and liberty can be defended without "recourse to invisible deities or the religions that exalt them."

She has testified on criminal justice and the decarceration movement before the US Senate Judiciary Committee, has testified before the Subcommittee on Civil and Constitutional Rights of the US House Committee on the Judiciary, and has advocated positions on numerous subjects including victimization, philanthropy, immigration reform, crime prevention, racism, racial profiling, black incarceration, rape, effect of two parents on crime, politics, welfare, and matters pertaining to cities and academia.

Mac Donald has criticized welfare and philanthropic institutions such as the Ford Foundation and the Carnegie Corporation for suggesting that welfare is a right; in particular, she has criticized welfare because "generations have grown up fatherless and dependent". She has written that welfare programs serve as a "dysfunction enabler" and that a fall in food stamp use was because "former welfare recipients are deciding to go it on their own" — a "move toward self-sufficiency [that] should be cause for celebration", and that "Food pantries ... are in fact a wiser response to temporary hunger than expanding the rolls, for independence is a better guarantee of eating well than entitlements can ever be."

In 2008, Mac Donald accepted the Eugene Katz Award for Excellence in the Coverage of Immigration from the Center for Immigration Studies, an anti-immigration think tank. According to Mac Donald, under American immigration policies, the United States has been "importing another underclass", one with the "potential to expand indefinitely." The New York Times reported in January 2024 that in private emails with anti-DEI commentators affiliated with the Claremont Institute, Mac Donald had recounted "seeing all the nannies of color walking school children back to their apartments" and derided working mothers who "outsource ... raising a unique child to some one else, especially someone from the low IQ 3rd world" while they advance their careers.

In another private correspondence with Claremont Institute affiliates, Mac Donald criticized Peter Thiel's gay marriage (placing 'marriage' in scare quotes), mocking Thiel's husband and saying that Thiel's outside boyfriend who had recently committed suicide showed that gay men “are much more prone” to extramarital affairs “on the empirical basis of testosterone unchecked by female modesty.”

In a 2019 op-ed titled, "Trump Isn’t the One Dividing Us by Race", she argued that Democrats and the media are at fault for racial divisions in the United States. She argued that it is those on the left who have emboldened white supremacists. She argued that Donald Trump is not racially divisive because he "rarely uses racial categories in his speech or his tweets."

During the COVID-19 pandemic, she criticized March 2020 shelter-in-place policies as "unbridled panic". She argued in March 2020 that COVID-19 would have a similar casualty rate as the flu, despite public health experts saying otherwise.

Heather Mac Donald is a believer in the Great Replacement Theory, stating in 2024 that the “Great Replacement theory is real,” and in 2025 that the Great Replacement theory is "just a reality."

=== Policing and national security ===
Mac Donald has been described as "pro-police". She has rejected descriptions of racism in policing, calling them a "false narrative" and "phantom police racism". She has called for a return to Terry stop and frisk tactics and "zero-tolerance" policing. She has argued that too much criticism of police brutality has made police fearful of engaging in proactive policing, and that this has caused more crime. She has been a vocal critic of Black Lives Matter. While talking to the conservative radio host Rush Limbaugh, she accused President Barack Obama of "attacking the very foundation of civilization" by giving credibility to Black Lives Matter.

During the 2016 presidential election, she described a speech by Donald Trump on criminal justice as "a radical, bold, and important change of course in the prevailing discourse about policing and crime."

She is an outspoken critic of criminal justice reform, such as the Sentencing Reform and Corrections Act, which she testified against in October 2015. She has spoken out against no-racial-profiling programs for the police, calling them a "politically correct ignoring" of what is known to be the "logical necessity of Islamic terrorism." She has criticized efforts to instate no-racial-profiling policies, calling these efforts an "illogical tautology" because "you cannot be an Islamic terrorist unless you're a member of the Muslim faith".

She has defended the Patriot Act and argued for secrecy and speed in handling problems as well as the sharing of information between departments within the intelligence community, and advocated that the benefits of government power be balanced against the risks of abuse. She stated that the interrogation techniques promulgated in the war on terror were "light years" from real torture and "hedged around" with bureaucratic safeguards.

In her 2005 testimony to Congress, she claimed that 95% of outstanding homicide warrants in Los Angeles were for undocumented immigrants and that 75% of L.A.'s most wanted list comprised undocumented immigrants. Fact checks by PolitiFact and Snopes found no evidence for those assertions; Mac Donald told PolitiFact in 2020 that the figures were a "rough estimate" given to her by an unnamed member of the Los Angeles Police Department.

In September 2019 congressional testimony, Mac Donald cited a July 2019 PNAS study on the races of police officers and civilians who are shot, which purported to show that there was no racial bias in police shootings. However, the study that she cited has been corrected, and the editors of the journal wrote that the study was unable to support any conclusions about racial bias in police shootings. One of the study's authors, University of Maryland psychology professor David Johnson, told CityLab that he was "not happy" with the way Mac Donald has characterized the study. The authors of the study later called for its retraction, saying that the study continued to be misused, with the authors specifically mentioning editorials by Mac Donald.

== Reviews of her books ==
Writing in The New York Times in 2000, Robin Finn described Mac Donald as an "influential institute thinker who risks being stereotyped as a right-leaning academic curmudgeon". Columnist George F. Will wrote a blurb for Mac Donald's book The Burden of Bad Ideas (2000). In The New York Times, Allen D. Boyer wrote a positive brief review of The Burden of Bad Ideas, concluding that "among discussions of urban malaise, where so much hot air has been recycled, this book has the freshness of a stiff, changing breeze".

Tim Lynch, director of the Cato Institute's project on criminal justice, gave her 2016 book The War on Cops a negative review in Reason magazine, concluding, "What Mac Donald calls a 'war on cops' is better described as a much-needed debate about crime, law enforcement tactics, and how to deal with systemic police misconduct," and adding, "Conservatives have some worthwhile ideas to offer in this debate, but Mac Donald's polemics add heat, not light."

Steven Pinker, Charles Murray and Shelby Steele provided blurbs for Mac Donald's 2018 book The Diversity Delusion.

== 2017 protest ==
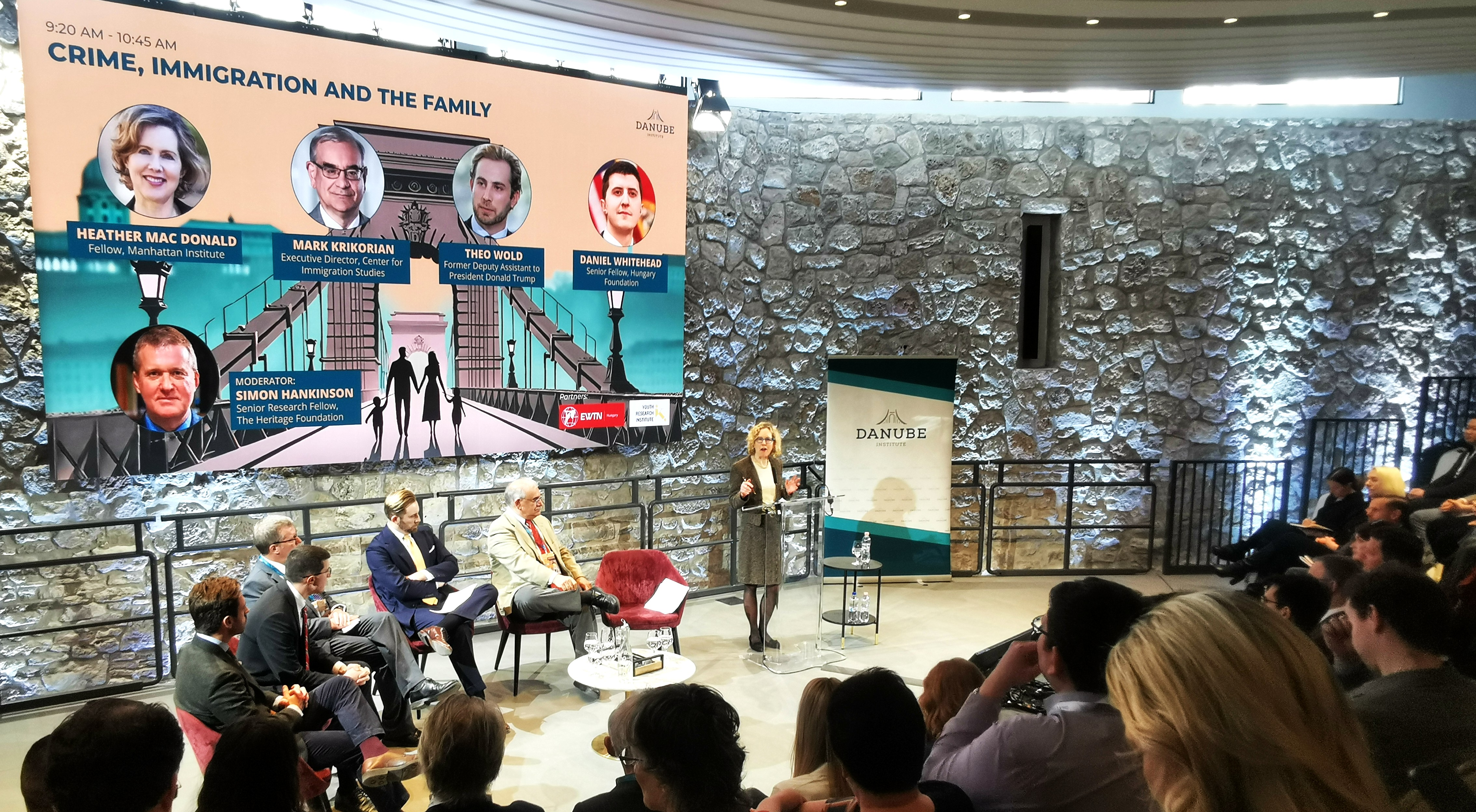
Lecture in Budapest - Crime, Immigration and the Family

In the spring of 2017, a protest group announced plans to "shut down" Mac Donald's speech on the Black Lives Matter movement at a college campus in California, calling her racist, fascist, and anti-black. On April 7, around 250 protesters surrounded audience members and prevented them from entering the building where she was speaking at Claremont McKenna College, whose president, Hiram Chodosh, afterward said, "Based on the judgment of the Claremont Police Department, we jointly concluded that any forced interventions or arrests would have created unsafe conditions for students, faculty, staff, and guests." Mac Donald ultimately gave the talk to a small audience in the Marian Miner Cook Athenaeum that was live-streamed on Claremont McKenna's website. Chodosh said that "the effort to silence her voice effectively amplified it to a much larger audience." The college subsequently suspended seven students.

== Books ==
- The Burden of Bad Ideas: How Modern Intellectuals Misshape Our Society. Ivan R. Dee. 2000. ISBN 1-56663-337-0.
- Are Cops Racist?. Ivan R. Dee. 2003. ISBN 1-56663-489-X.
- The Illegal-Alien Crime Wave, "City Journal" Winter 2004
- The Immigration Solution (co-authored with Victor Davis Hanson and Steven Malanga). Ivan R. Dee. 2006.
- The War on Cops: How the New Attack on Law and Order Makes Everyone Less Safe. Perseus Distribution Services. 2016. ISBN 978-1594038754.
- The Diversity Delusion: How Race and Gender Pandering Corrupt the University and Undermine Our Culture. St. Martin's Press. 2018. ISBN 9781250200914.
- When Race Trumps Merit: How the Pursuit of Equity Sacrifices Excellence, Destroys Beauty, and Threatens Lives. DW Books. 2023. ISBN 978-1956007169.

== Awards ==
- Bradley Prize for Outstanding Intellectual Achievement, 2005.

== Personal life ==
Mac Donald is an atheist. She lives in New York City.
