= Cyrus Baldwin =

Cyrus Baldwin may refer to:

- Cyrus Baldwin (engineer) (1773–1854), American civil engineer
- Cyrus G. Baldwin (1852–1931), president of Pomona College and hydroelectric power entrepreneur
