= Jack L. Stark =

Former president of Claremont McKenna College

3rd President of Claremont McKenna College
- In office July 1, 1970 – June 30, 1999
- Preceded by: Howard Neville
- Succeeded by: Pamela Gann

Personal details
- Born: 1934 (age 90–91) Urbana, Indiana, U.S.
- Spouse: Jil Harris
- Children: 4
- Education: Claremont McKenna College (BA)

Jack L. Stark (born 1934) is president emeritus of Claremont McKenna College in Claremont, California. He was CMC's third president, serving a 29-year tenure from 1970 to 1999.

== Early life and education ==
Stark was born in Urbana, Indiana. He was himself a 1957 graduate of CMC, then known as Claremont Men's College, earning a bachelor of arts degree in literature and economics.

== Career and legacy ==
After serving in the United States Marine Corps for three years, Stark returned to CMC in 1961 as director of alumni relations. He was eventually chosen as assistant to founding president George C. S. Benson.

Stark led CMC through major changes over the course of his 29 years as president. In 1976, the college began admitting women, and in 1981, it was renamed Claremont McKenna College to acknowledge its co-ed status while also honoring founding trustee Donald McKenna.

Stark continues to serve on the CMC Board of Trustees as a life trustee. His contributions to the college are remembered through the Jack L. Stark Distinguished Service Award, given in recognition of outstanding service to the College, the Alumni Association and to the Alumni of Claremont McKenna College and the Jack L. Stark society, a gift club level for CMC donors. Stark Hall, Claremont McKenna's substance-free residence hall, is also named in his honor.

== Personal life ==
Jack is married to Jil Harris Stark, with whom he has four children. They live in Claremont, California.
