= George Augustus Gates =

American university administrator

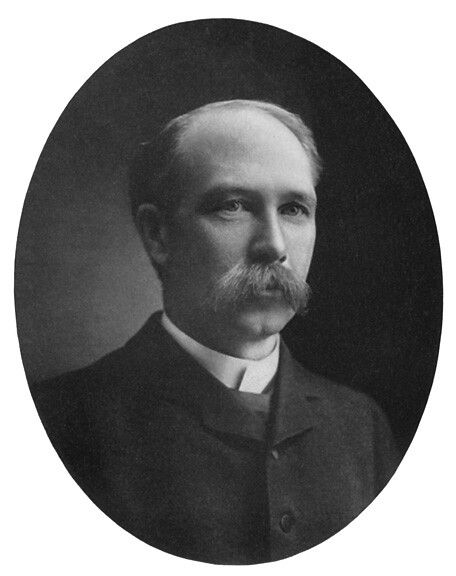

3rd President of Pomona College
- In office 1902–1909
- Preceded by: Franklin La Du Ferguson
- Succeeded by: James A. Blaisdell

Personal details
- Born: January 24, 1851 Topsham, Vermont, U.S.
- Died: November 20, 1912 (aged 61) Winter Haven, Florida, U.S.
- Spouse: Isabelle Augusta Smith
- Education: Dartmouth College; Andover Theological Seminary

George Augustus Gates (January 24, 1851 – November 20, 1912) was an American Congregational minister and university administrator. He served as the second president of Grinnell College from 1887 to 1900, as the third president of Pomona College from 1902 to 1909, and as president of Fisk University from 1909 to 1912.

== Early life ==
George Augustus Gates was born on January 24, 1851, in Topsham, Vermont. He graduated from Dartmouth College in 1873. After studying in Germany for two years, he graduated from the Andover Theological Seminary in 1880, when he was ordained as a Congregationalist minister.

== Career ==
Gates served as a Congregationalist minister in Upper Montclair, New Jersey, from 1880 to 1887. He was also the pastor of the First Congregational Church of Cheyenne, Wyoming, from January to November 1901.

Gates was the president of Iowa College, now known as Grinnell College, from 1887 to 1900, and Pomona College in California from 1902 to 1909. He served as the third president of Fisk University, a historically black university in Nashville, Tennessee, from 1909 to 1912. Upon his inauguration at Fisk in 1910, the university received $5,000 from the General Education Board.

Gates was awarded an honorary D.D. degree from Dartmouth College in 1892 and an honorary LL.D degree from the University of Nebraska in 1893. According to The New York Sun, "Dr. Gates was considered one of the foremost leaders in the higher education of the negro race."

== Personal life and death ==
Gates married Isabelle Augusta Smith in 1882. He fell ill due to a "severe accident" in 1912, and died on November 20, 1912, in Winter Haven, Florida.

== Selected works ==
- Gates, George A. (1897). A Foe to American Schools: A Vacation Study. Minneapolis, Minnesota: Kingdom Publishing Company. OCLC 80512539.
