= Franklin La Du Ferguson =

President of Pomona College

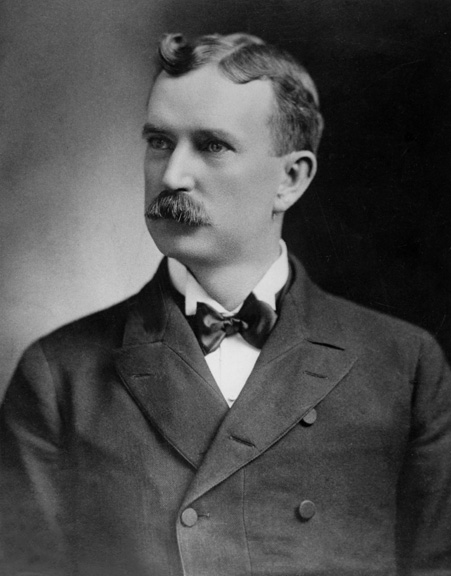

2nd President of Pomona College
- In office 1897–1901
- Preceded by: Cyrus G. Baldwin
- Succeeded by: George A. Gates

Personal details
- Born: June 21, 1861 Tamworth, Ontario, Canada
- Died: May 27, 1944 (aged 82) Orlando, Florida, US
- Spouse: Margaret Jeannette Maxwell
- Children: 3
- Parents: John Ferguson (father); Matilda Pomeroy Ferguson (mother)
- Education: Albert College; Yale University (BD)
- Profession: Academic

Franklin La Du Ferguson (June 21, 1861 – May 27, 1944) was a minister in the Congregational church and the second president of Pomona College in Claremont, California. He served from 1897 to 1901, the briefest tenure of any Pomona president to date.

== Early life ==
Franklin La Du Ferguson was born at Tamworth, Ontario, Canada, in 1861 to John and Matilda Pomeroy Ferguson. His father was of Scotch-Irish descent, and his mother was descended from Mayflower Pilgrims. He studied for the ministry at Albert College and then at Yale University, graduating with a Bachelor of Divinity degree in 1888. He served as a pastor in Milford, Connecticut, and directed the Chadron Academy in Chadron, Nebraska.

== Pomona presidency ==
Ferguson was selected as Pomona College's second president in 1897 by the college's board of trustees, who knew him as a representative of the Congregational Education Society who had successfully sought donors on the college's behalf. He succeeded Cyrus G. Baldwin, who the board had asked to resign that July amid a period of financial panic for the fledgling school.

During his tenure, he focused on raising funds and oversaw the construction of Pearsons Hall, the President's House, and the first Renwick Gymnasium. The President's House has been home to eight Pomona presidents and is the oldest presidential residence still in use at any college or university in California.

During this time, he also evidently used his office to make illegal personal real estate investments that lost money, putting the college at financial risk. He was also unpopular with the student body, in part because of a request he made upon taking office for a censor of The Student Life, which had published an editorial questioning a fundraising claim he made. Ferguson was also accused of plagiarizing the baccalaureate address he gave to the class of 1901 for their graduation ceremony. The board asked him to resign at the end of his third year.

== Later life ==
Ferguson was later involved in business in Boston and New York, and in 1920 moved to Orlando, Florida, where he established in 1931 the Orlando Shopping News, an advertising newspaper in which he also published political views. He died in Orlando on May 27, 1944.

== Legacy ==
Referred to as the "Missing President," Ferguson is the only past Pomona president not honored by a portrait, and the college's official timeline describes his presidency as arguably the least successful to date.
