= Pamela J. Hinds =

Pamela J. Hinds is a scholar of organizational behavior and technology management. She is the Rodney H. Adams Chair and professor in the Department of Management Science and Engineering at Stanford University.

== Early life and education ==
Hinds received a Bachelor of Arts in political science and foreign affairs from Claremont McKenna College in 1982. She subsequently earned a Master of Arts in human resources and organizational development from the University of San Francisco in 1989, a Master of Philosophy in public policy and management from Carnegie Mellon University's Department of Social and Decision Sciences in 1993, and a PhD in organization science and management from the department in 1997.

== Career ==
Before joining Stanford, Hinds was a Technical Director at Pacific Bell and later a member of the technical staff at Hewlett Packard Labs from 1997 to 1998, where she researched the social impact of technologies.

In 1998, Hinds joined Stanford University's Department of Management Science and Engineering as an assistant professor. She became a professor in 2015. From 2020 to 2025, she served as chair of the department.

At Stanford, Hinds has also served as faculty director of School of Engineering Global Programs and co-director of the Center for Work, Technology and Organization. She has been affiliated with the Stanford d.school and the Stanford Institute for Human-Centered Artificial Intelligence. In April 2024, Hinds received the Rodney H. Adams Endowed Chair in Stanford University's School of Engineering.

== Selected publications ==
=== Books ===
- Hinds, P.; Kiesler, S., eds. (2002). Distributed Work. MIT Press

=== Journal publications ===
- Hinds, P.; Kiesler, S. (1995). "Communication across boundaries: Work, structure, and use of communication technologies in a large organization." Organization Science. 6 (4): 373–393. doi:10.1287/orsc.6.4.373.
- Hinds, P. (1999). "The curse of expertise: The effects of expertise and debiasing methods on predictions of novice performance." Journal of Experimental Psychology: Applied. 5 (2): 205–221. doi:10.1037/1076-898X.5.2.205.
- Hinds, P.; Bailey, D. (2003). "Out of sight, out of sync: Understanding conflict in distributed teams." Organization Science. 14 (6): 615–632. doi:10.1287/orsc.14.6.615.24872.
- Hinds, P.; Mortensen, M. (2005). "Understanding conflict in geographically distributed teams: The moderating effects of shared identity, shared context, and spontaneous communication." Organization Science. 16 (3): 290–307. doi:10.1287/orsc.1050.0122.
- Dahlin, K.; Weingart, L.; Hinds, P. (2005). "Team diversity and information use." Academy of Management Journal. 48 (6): 1107–1123. doi:10.5465/amj.2005.19573112.
- Stubbs, K.; Hinds, P.; Wettergreen, D. (2007). "Autonomy and common ground in human–robot interaction: A field study with a remote autonomous explorer." IEEE Intelligent Systems. 22 (2): 42–50. doi:10.1109/MIS.2007.21.
- Hinds, P.; Liu, L.; Lyon, J. (2011). "Putting the global in global work: An intercultural lens on the practice of cross-national collaboration." Academy of Management Annals. 5 (1): 135–188. doi:10.1080/19416520.2011.586108.
- Hinds, P.; Cramton, C. (2014). "Situated coworker familiarity: How site visits transform relationships among distributed workers." Organization Science. 25 (3): 794–814. doi:10.1287/orsc.2013.0869.
- Cramton, C.; Hinds, P. (2014). "An embedded model of cultural adaptation in global teams." Organization Science. 25 (4): 1056–1081. doi:10.1287/orsc.2013.0885.
- Hinds, P.; Neeley, T.; Cramton, C. (2014). "Language as a lightning rod: Power contests, emotion regulation, and subgroup dynamics in global teams." Journal of International Business Studies. 45 (5): 536–561. doi:10.1057/jibs.2013.62.
- Nurmi, N.; Hinds, P. (2016). "Job complexity and learning opportunities: A silver lining in the design of global virtual work." Journal of International Business Studies. 47 (6): 631–654. doi:10.1057/jibs.2016.11.
- Värlander, S.; Hinds, P.; Thomason, B.; Pearce, B.; Altman, H. (2016). "Enacting a constellation of logics: How transferred practices are recontextualized in a global organization." Academy of Management Discoveries. 2 (1): 79–107. doi:10.5465/amd.2015.0020.
- Jung, M.; Hinds, P. (2018). "Robots in the wild: A time for more robust theories of human–robot interaction." ACM Transactions on Human-Robot Interaction. 7 (1): Article 2. doi:10.1145/3208975.
- Nurmi, N.; Hinds, P. (2020). "Work design for global professionals: Connectivity demands, connectivity behaviors, and their effects on psychological and behavioral outcomes." Organization Studies. 41 (12): 1697–1724. doi:10.1177/0170840620937885.
- Bailey, D.; Faraj, S.; Hinds, P.; Leonardi, P.; von Krogh, G. (2022). "We are all theorists of technology now: A relational perspective on emerging technology and organizing." Organization Science. 33 (1): 1–18. doi:10.1287/orsc.2021.1562.
- Brubaker, E.; Sheppard, S.; Hinds, P.; Yang, M. (2023). "Objects of collaboration: Roles and sequences of objects in spanning knowledge group boundaries in design." Journal of Mechanical Design. 145 (3): 031404. doi:10.1115/1.4056798.
- Stice-Lusvardi, R.; Hinds, P.; Valentine, M. (2023). "Legitimating illegitimate practices: How data analysts compromised their standards to promote quantification." Organization Science. 35 (2): 432–452. doi:10.1287/orsc.2022.1655.
- Hinds, P.; von Krogh, G. (2024). "Generative AI, emerging technology, and organizing: Towards a theory of progressive encapsulation." Organization Theory. 5 (4): 1–14. doi:10.1177/26317877241293478.
