= William C. Dudley (philosopher) =

American academic and university president

William C. Dudley (born in Charlottesville, Virginia) is an American academic administrator and philosopher, who currently serves as President of Claremont McKenna College in Claremont, California. He was previously the 27th president of Washington and Lee University (from January 2017 to July 2026). Prior to his presidency at Washington and Lee, he served as provost and professor of philosophy at Williams College.

== Early life and education ==
A Virginia native, Dudley was born in Charlottesville and raised in Arlington. He attended Williams College, where he graduated magna cum laude in 1989 with a double major in mathematics and philosophy. During his undergraduate years, he served as captain of the water polo team and was a member of the swim team. Upon graduation, he received a Herchel Smith Fellowship to study philosophy at the University of Cambridge from 1989 to 1990.

After his studies at Cambridge, Dudley worked for AES Corporation from 1990 to 1992. He then pursued graduate studies at Northwestern University, where he earned both his master's degree and Ph.D. in philosophy, completing his doctoral studies in 1998.

== Academic career ==
=== Williams College (1998-2016) ===
Dudley joined the faculty at Williams College in 1998, where he taught courses on moral and political philosophy, metaphysics, epistemology, the philosophy and economics of higher education, and the spiritual significance of sports. In 2004, he received tenure and was appointed chair of the Committee on Undergraduate Life.

From 2010 to 2011, Dudley served as the Gaudino Scholar at Williams, a presidential appointment designed to encourage curricular innovation and experiential learning. During his tenure as Gaudino Scholar, he initiated several programs including the Gaudino Lunch series, which facilitated conversations among students, faculty, and staff; supported neighborhood proposals to strengthen student-faculty interaction; and provided opportunities for independent Winter Study projects.

In July 2011, Dudley was appointed provost at Williams College, a position he held until December 2016.

=== Washington and Lee University (2017-present) ===
Dudley became the 27th president of Washington and Lee University in January 2017. He promptly initiated a strategic planning process, resulting in a plan approved in May 2018 that positioned W&L as a model for 21st-century liberal arts education. Under his leadership, the university has diversified its campus community, implemented new academic minors, and updated its facilities master plan. In October 2024, Dudley announced a transformative $132 million gift from alumnus William H. Miller III that established need-blind admissions at the university.

=== Claremont McKenna College ===
On December 4th, 2025, Dudley was announced as the incoming President of Claremont McKenna College. Dudley started at Claremont McKenna in July 2026 and had his official inauguration on Saturday, November 7, 2026. He succeeded Hiram Chodosh.

== Scholarship ==
Dudley's academic research focuses on 19th century German philosophy. He is the author of two books: "Understanding German Idealism" (2007) and "Hegel, Nietzsche and Philosophy: Thinking Freedom" (2002).

=== Selected publications ===
* Dudley, Will (2010). Hegel and History. doi:10.1515/9781438429113. ISBN 978-1-4384-2911-3.

== Personal life ==
Dudley is married to Dr. Carola Tanna.
