= Charles Burt Sumner =

Founding trustee of Pomona College

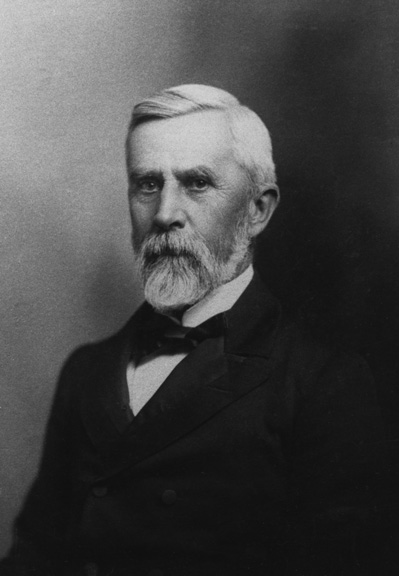

Financial Agent with Supervisory Authority of Pomona College
- In office 1888–1890
- Preceded by: Office established
- Succeeded by: Cyrus G. Baldwin (as president of Pomona College)

Personal details
- Born: August 17, 1837 Southbridge, Massachusetts, United States
- Died: July 11, 1927 (aged 89) Claremont, California, United States
- Spouses: Mary Louisa Stedman (m. 1869; died 1893) Maria Frost Cole (m. 1904; died 1905)
- Children: 2
- Education: Yale University
- Profession: Academic

Charles Burt Sumner (August 17, 1837 – July 11, 1927) was a minister in the Congregational church and a founding trustee of Pomona College who served as its de facto first president.

== Life and career ==
Sumner was born on August 17, 1837, in Southbridge, Massachusetts, to George and Julia Sumner. He went to Southbridge Academy and Williston Seminary, and then attended Yale University, graduating in 1862.

During the Civil War, he fought for the Union for nine months as a sergeant in the 45th Massachusetts Infantry Regiment.

He later graduated from the Andover Theological Seminary, and held pastorates in Monson, Massachusetts (at Monson Academy), West Somerville, Massachusetts, Tucson, Arizona, Pomona, California, and Claremont, California.

In 1888, he left the Pilgrim Congregational Church in Pomona to become Pomona College's "financial agent with supervisory authority", a position in which he assumed the duties of a college president. During his tenure, the college began teaching its first classes in Ayer Cottage and acquired 120 acres (49 ha) of land in Piedmont Mesa north of Pomona for a planned permanent campus. In October 1888, the college acquired an unfinished hotel in Claremont (today's Sumner Hall) and moved there in the following months. In 1890, he helped recruit Pomona's first official president, Cyrus G. Baldwin.

Sumner remained a Pomona College trustee until his retirement in 1924. He also taught biblical literature at the college between 1888 and 1899. In 1892, he opposed the college's decision to make Claremont its permanent home, but he later relocated his house to Claremont in 1901, living in it during the six-week move. In 1910, Pomona gave him the college's first honorary doctorate, a Legum Doctor degree. In 1914, he published a comprehensive history of the college.

Sumner was also involved in the development of citrus fruit marketing cooperatives, and served as the president of the Indian Hill Citrus Association and San Dimas Orange Association, and the director of the San Dimas Lemon Association.

He died on July 11, 1927, of pneumonia.

== Legacy ==
Sumner's daughter, Helen, and son, George, both graduated from Pomona's first class of students in 1894. George later taught economics at Pomona and became its controller in 1923. His grandson, George Charles Sumner Benson, became the founding president of Claremont McKenna College.

Sumner's house was occupied by his son and grandson, and later rented to faculty and used as a dormitory for vegetarian students. It has served as the college's guest house since 1992.

Pomona's first building, Sumner Hall, was named for his wife, Mary Louisa Stedman Sumner, in 1893. It serves as the college's office of admissions today.

== Publications ==
- The Story of Pomona College. Pilgrim Press. 1914.
