= Roberts Environmental Center =

The Roberts Environmental Center is a research institute at Claremont McKenna College in Claremont, California, United States. It is named after George R. Roberts '66, founding partner, Kohlberg Kravis Roberts & Co., a private equity firm. The principal goal of the Roberts Environmental Center is to involve students in real-world environmental issues and train them to analyze issues from as broad a perspective as possible, taking science, economics and policy into consideration, especially environmental law, environmental biology, and natural resource management. The center's current research is focused on global corporate environmental transparency and performance. The center is a leading analyst of online corporate environmental and sustainability self-reporting, with free analysis of more than 1,900 corporate reports. All analyses are available free online with more added weekly.

== Corporate Sustainability Reporting Analysis ==
For over a decade, many of the world's largest corporations have produced voluntary environmental and sustainability reports publicizing the perceived successes of corporate environmental management systems. The most common reason has been to assure stakeholders—employees, investors, customers—that the company takes environmental and social matters seriously and acts responsibly. The Center uses its own index based loosely on the widely adopted reporting guidelines of the Global Reporting Initiative (GRI) and aspects of the ISO14000 Environmental Management Standard to score and rank companies within industrial sectors, and assign letter grades. Sector reports are released as they are completed and include as many as 30 companies.

== Analysis and results ==
The Roberts Environmental Center analyzes online corporate self-reporting using the Pacific Sustainability Index, which includes sector-specific questions and uses a general systematic questionnaire to analyze the quality of sustainability reporting. Students from all five of the Claremont Colleges study and work in the Roberts Center in a joint effort among faculty, research associates, and students. The Center publishes these results on their web site in graphical form, in published sector reports, technical papers, and books.

The Center analyzes environmental and social self-reporting by the world's largest companies and publishes the results of up to 30 companies at a time in industrial sector reports. The reports score companies based on reporting, intent, and performance of environmental and social sustainability efforts. The Center ranks companies and assigns letter grades for their for overall quality of reporting, based entirely on material released on the firms’ Web sites. No assessment is made of actual company performance in implementing their sustainability goals. Prior to final publication, companies are given an opportunity to point out any omissions or misunderstandings on the part of the center's analysts, and to post additional material to their web sites for further analysis prior to assigning a final letter grade. Many companies take advantage of this opportunity. These detailed analyses reveal what social and environmental themes companies perceive to be most important to the American public today. All sector reports are available for free download.

Roberts Center publications assert that large and small organizations can gain by adopting a strong vision of sustainability, publicizing it, and systematically working to improve—no matter what a company's current level of performance is.

== 2009 Sector Reports ==
- 2009 Sustainability Reporting in New York Public Companies Accessed 5–30–09.
- 2009 Consumer Food, Food Production, and Beverages Industry Report Accessed 5–30–09.
- 2009 Industrial and Farm Equipment Industry Report Accessed 5–30–09.
- 2009 Forest and Paper Products Industry Report Accessed 5–30–09.
- 2009 America's Largest Corporations: Energy Industry Report Accessed 5–30–09.
- 2009 America's Largest Corporations: Utilities, Gas, and Electric Industry Report Accessed 5–30–09.
- 2009 Telecommunications, Network, and Peripherals Industry Report Accessed 5–30–09.
- 2009 Motor Vehicles and Parts Industry Report Accessed 5–30–09.
