= Pamela Gann =

American legal scholar and college president

4th President of Claremont McKenna College
- In office July 1, 1999 – June 30, 2013
- Preceded by: Jack L. Stark
- Succeeded by: Hiram Chodosh

Personal details
- Born: Monroe, North Carolina, U.S.
- Education: University of North Carolina at Chapel Hill (BA); Duke University (JD)

Pamela Brooks Gann served as the fourth of five presidents of Claremont McKenna College in California. She became president on July 1, 1999, and served until June 30, 2013. She was succeeded by Hiram Chodosh on July 1, 2013.

On May 15, 2012, she announced she would step down from her position on June 30, 2013, take a year's leave and then return to the college as "College Professor of Legal Studies."

== Biography ==
Born in Monroe, North Carolina, Gann graduated Phi Beta Kappa from the University of North Carolina at Chapel Hill in 1970 with a degree in mathematics. She graduated from Duke University's School of Law in 1973 where she was elected to the Order of the Coif. She practiced law in Atlanta, Georgia and Charlotte, North Carolina. Gann returned to Duke in 1975, becoming dean in 1988 before taking up her post at Claremont McKenna in 1999.

Gann's background in international education includes teaching American law and international trade in the People's Republic of China, France, Denmark, Vietnam, and at the Salzburg Seminar, Salzburg. She has also visited at the University of Virginia and the University of Michigan, and was awarded an International Affairs Fellowship by the Council on Foreign Relations, through which she worked at the International Monetary Fund and the Office of the U.S. Trade Representative.

Gann's active participation in law, higher education, and international policy includes service on the board of directors of the Council on Foreign Relations, the International Women's Forum, the Society of International Business Fellows, and the American Law Institute. She also was elected to fellowship of the American Bar Foundation, and was chosen for membership in the Deloitte Council on the Advancement of Women (WIN), and as a trustee of the Southwestern Law School, the Committee for Economic Development, and The Institute for the International Education of Students. She is a former member of the board of directors of the American Council on Education and a former member of the NCAA Division III President's Council. She was awarded the "Women Lawyer of the Year" award by the North Carolina Association of Women Attorneys.
