= Ran Libeskind-Hadas =

American computer scientist

Ran Libeskind-Hadas is the founding chair of the Department of Integrated Sciences at Claremont McKenna College. He was previously a professor of computer science at Harvey Mudd College where he served as chair of that department and associate dean of faculty. His research interests lie in the area of algorithms for computational biology.

Libeskind-Hadas graduated from Harvard University with a degree in applied mathematics in 1987. He went on to complete an M.S. and Ph.D. in computer science at the University of Illinois at Urbana-Champaign in 1993. In August of that year, he was hired into the Department of Mathematics at Harvey Mudd College and, the following year, moved to the Department of Computer Science.

Libeskind-Hadas serves on the Executive Board of the Computing Research Association, the editorial board of the Communications of the ACM, and the National Science Foundation CISE Advisory Council.
