= Cyrus G. Baldwin =

First president of Pomona College

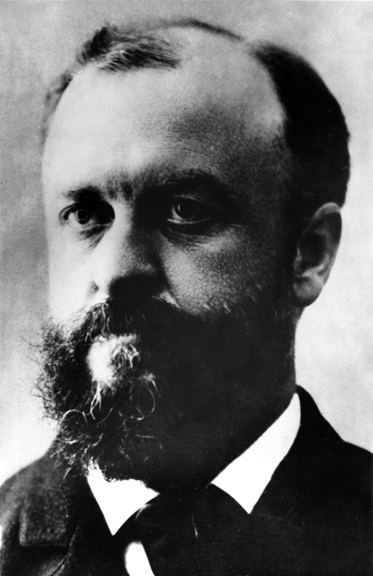

1st President of Pomona College
- In office 1890–1897
- Preceded by: Charles Burt Sumner (as Financial Agent with Supervisory Authority)
- Succeeded by: Franklin La Du Ferguson

Personal details
- Born: Cyrus Grandson Baldwin; October 10, 1852 Napoli, New York, US
- Died: January 10, 1931 (aged 78) California, US
- Spouse: Ella Baldwin
- Children: 1
- Education: Oberlin College
- Profession: Academic

Cyrus Grandison Baldwin (October 10, 1852 – January 10, 1931) was an American minister in the Congregational Church, the first official president of Pomona College, and a pioneer of hydroelectric power in Southern California.

== Early life and career ==
Baldwin was born in Napoli, New York, in 1852. He moved to Ohio with his family when he was a child and graduated from Oberlin College in 1873. He completed his seminary degree at Andover Theological Seminary in 1876, becoming ordained five years later. After that, he became a professor of Latin at Ripon College, and helped fundraise for the YMCA.

== Pomona College presidency ==
His success at the latter endeavor led to his election as the first official president of Pomona College in 1890 by its board of trustees, succeeding trustee Charles B. Sumner, who had led the college during its founding years. He became popular among both students and community members, enjoying a loyal following.

Baldwin arrived with his family in August of 1890. He built a two-and-a-half story residence, Baldwin House, in 1893 for his family after the question of Pomona College's permanent location in Claremont was settled.

During his tenure, he sought to raise desperately needed funds for the fledgling school, ultimately increasing its endowment by $100,000 (equivalent to $3.9 million in 2025). When a donor offered to fund a second building for the college, he argued for it to be built in Claremont, rather than the college's planned permanent location at Piedmont Mesa north of Pomona. The decision was supported by the college's board of trustees in a seven-to-four vote in 1892, establishing Claremont as the college's permanent home.

In 1891, as part of his fundraising efforts, Baldwin founded the San Antonio Light and Power Company, which built a hydroelectric power station in San Antonio Canyon that transmitted power to the valley via high-voltage transmission, the first such instance in California. The venture was ultimately unprofitable, though, due to the inconsistency of the water supply.

By 1897, he had become overwhelmed with the pressure of fundraising and resigned at the request of the board of trustees. Upon his retirement, the class of 1898 commissioned an oil portrait for him, noting "his keen sense of justice, his insight into human nature, his scholarly attainments, his broad humanity and his liberal culture," and adding "but more than that, we love the man."

He maintained close ties with Pomona following his presidency, and his daughter, Florence, graduated from the college in 1901.

== Later life and death ==
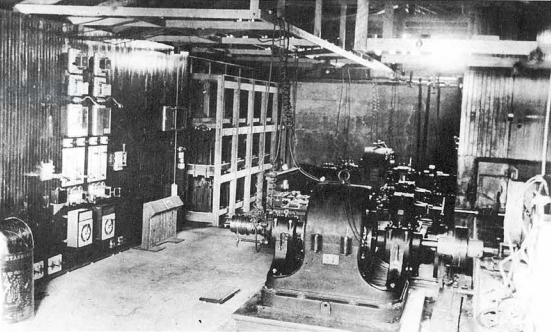
The Pomona Water Powerplant, c. 1892

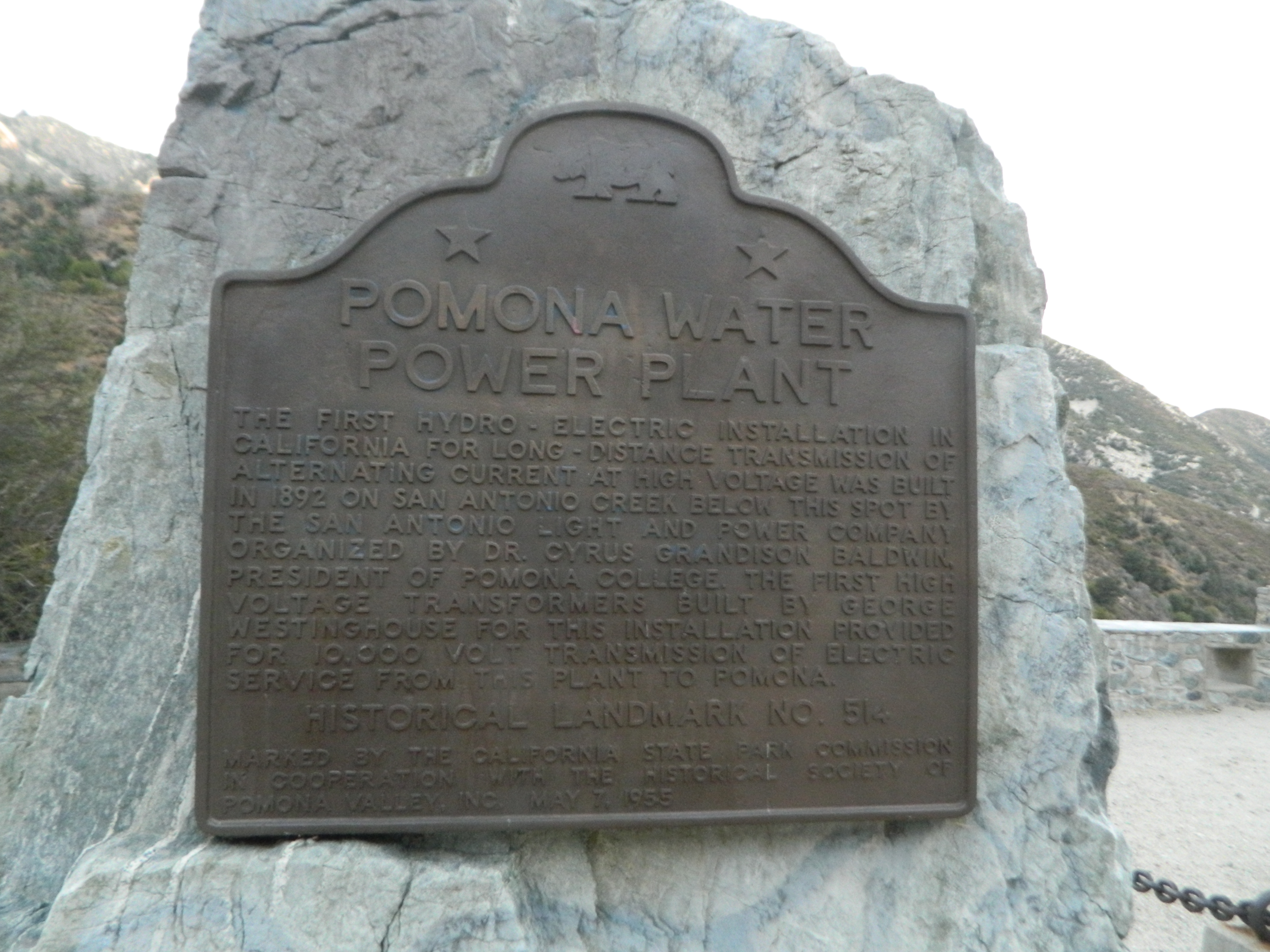
Marker at the site today

After leaving higher education, Baldwin continued his efforts with the San Antonio Light and Power Company, seeking to build another power station and irrigation project at Mill Creek in San Bernardino County. However, the venture failed due to a combination of lack of funding, drought, and water rights disputes.

He moved to Palo Alto in 1902, where he served as the pastor of the city's Congregational church from 1902 to 1910. He died of a stroke on January 10, 1931.
