= George C. S. Benson =

American academic (1908–1999)

1st President of Claremont McKenna College
- In office September 1, 1946 – 1969
- Preceded by: office established
- Succeeded by: Howard Neville

Personal details
- Born: George Charles Sumner Benson; January 16, 1908 New York City, U.S.
- Died: March 22, 1999 (aged 91) Claremont, California, U.S.
- Spouse(s): Mabel Gibberd (died 1983); Katharine Corbett Lowe (died 1999)
- Children: 3
- Relatives: Charles Burt Sumner (grandfather); Mary Sumner Benson (sister)
- Education: Pomona College (BA); University of Illinois (MA); Harvard University (PhD)

George Charles Sumner Benson (January 16, 1908 – March 22, 1999) was an American academic and administrator. He was the founding president of Claremont McKenna College.

== Education and career ==
Benson was born to an episcopal priest in New York in 1908. He graduated from Pomona College in 1928, received his M.A. from the University of Illinois the following year and his Ph.D. in government from Harvard University in 1931. He worked as an instructor in government at Harvard until 1934. He then served as research director at the Council of State Governments in Chicago, a lecturer at the University of Chicago, associate professor at the University of Michigan and finally, full professor at Northwestern University. He was a military government officer during World War II and spent some time in occupied Italy and Austria.

Benson became the founding president of Claremont Men's College (now Claremont McKenna College) in 1946. He resigned to take up the position of Deputy Assistant Secretary of Defense for Reserve Affairs in 1969.

== Personal life ==
Benson had three children, two sons and a stepson. His first wife, Mabel Benson, died in 1983. He later married Katharine Corbett Lowe Benson, who died on March 1, 1999. Charles Burt Sumner, the de facto first president of Pomona College, was his grandfather.
