= Hiram Chodosh =

President of Claremont McKenna College

5th President of Claremont McKenna College
- In office July 1, 2013 – June 30, 2026
- Preceded by: Pamela Gann
- Succeeded by: William C. Dudley

Personal details
- Born: 1962 (age 63–64) Elizabeth, New Jersey
- Spouse: Priya Junnar
- Children: 2
- Education: Wesleyan University (BA); Yale University (JD)
- Awards: Gandhi Peace Award (2011)
- Website: National Constitution Center

Hiram E. Chodosh (born 1962) is an American lawyer who was the 5th president of Claremont McKenna College in Claremont, California. He will serve as president and CEO of the National Constitution Center in Philadelphia, Pennsylvania, effective January 1, 2027.

== Early life and education ==
Hiram Chodosh was born in Elizabeth, New Jersey, in 1962. Raised in nearby Hillside, he graduated from Hillside High School.

He received his B.A. in history from Wesleyan University in 1985, and his J.D. in 1990 from Yale Law School. In his second year at Yale, Chodosh met his wife, Priya Junnar.

== Career ==
Chodosh began his law career in 1990 at Cleary Gottlieb Steen & Hamilton and left in 1993 to join the faculty of Case Western Reserve University School of Law. In 2003, Chodosh was named a Fulbright Senior Scholar and played a central role in the practice and expansion of mediation in India.

In 2006, Chodosh was appointed as Dean of the S.J. Quinney College of Law at the University of Utah. Under a grant from the U.S. Department of State in 2007, Chodosh founded and directed the Global Justice Project, a law and policy think tank, to advise the Iraqi government. In recognition of his international efforts in legal reform and advocacy for mediation, Chodosh was awarded the Gandhi Peace Award in 2011. In February 2012, he was appointed as the Hugh B. Brown Endowed Chair of the University.

In December 2012, he was selected to be the 5th President of Claremont McKenna College.

He will step down as President of Claremont McKenna after the 2025-26 academic year.

== Claremont McKenna College ==
Under Chodosh's leadership, Claremont McKenna College raised more than $1 billion in new funding for scholarship and special student opportunities, as well as create new institutions and centers such as the CARE Center, the Soll Center for Student Opportunities, the Robert Day Sciences Center, the Kravis Department of Integrated Sciences, the Roberts Campus Sports Bowl, the Policy Lab, the Murty Sunak Quantitative and Computing Lab, and the Open Academy. He concluded his service as president on June 30, 2026 and was succeeded by William C. Dudley.

== National Constitution Center ==
Chodosh was named the President and CEO of the National Constitution Center in Philadelphia, Pennsylvania, effective January 1, 2027.

== Selected works ==
=== Books ===
- Global Justice Reform: A Comparative Methodology (NYU Press, 2005)
- Law in Iraq: A Document Companion (with co-editor Chibli Mallat, Oxford University Press, 2013)
- Uniform Civil Code for India: Proposed Blueprint for Scholarly Discourse (with Shimon Shetreet, Oxford University Press, 2016)
