= Claremont McKenna College =

Private liberal arts college in California

Coordinates: 34.10171°N 117.70700°W

- Former name: Claremont Men's College (1946–1981)
- Motto: Crescit cum commercio civitas (Latin)
- Motto in English: Civilization prospers with commerce
- Type: Private liberal arts college
- Established: 1946; 80 years ago
- Academic affiliations: Claremont Colleges; NAICU; Annapolis Group; Oberlin Group
- Endowment: $1.24 billion (2024)
- President: William C. Dudley (philosopher)
- Academic staff: 158
- Students: 1,338 (2019)
- Location: Claremont, California, United States
- Campus: Suburban, 69 acres (28 ha)
- Colors: Maroon and black
- Nickname: Claremont-Mudd-Scripps Stags and Athenas
- Sporting affiliations: NCAA Division III – SCIAC
- Website: www.cmc.edu

Claremont McKenna College (CMC) is a private liberal arts college in Claremont, California. CMC is one of the seven members of the Claremont Colleges consortium.

Established in 1946 as a men's college, CMC was officially incorporated in 1947 and began admitting women in 1976. The college focuses primarily on undergraduate education. In 2007, it founded the Robert Day School of Economics and Finance, which offers a master's program in finance. Faculty at CMC are noted for exhibiting a more politically conservative orientation than those at similar liberal arts institutions. In 2019, there were 1,338 undergraduate students and postgraduate students.

CMC competes in the NCAA Division III's Southern California Intercollegiate Athletic Conference (SCIAC) conference in a joint athletic program with Harvey Mudd College and Scripps College. Notable alumni include prominent politicians and financiers such as Henry Kravis, a significant benefactor of CMC.

== History ==
=== Early history ===
Known as Claremont Men's College at its founding in September 1946, CMC began with seven faculty and an incoming class of 86 students, many of them World War II veterans attending college on the G.I. Bill. Claremont Men's College was the third Claremont College, after Pomona College and Scripps College. The college's motto is "Crescit cum commercio civitas", or "Civilization prospers with commerce".

=== Coeducation ===
In 1975, CMC trustees voted to admit women in a two-thirds vote supported by students representing the Associated Students of Claremont Men's College; the first women admitted to CMC joined in 1976. The move followed a national trend toward coeducation among peer schools. CMC president Jack L. Stark, who led the college during the transition, considered it CMC’s most important moment. The women of CMC's earliest classes are known as "Pioneers" and graduated with degrees that still bore the name "Claremont's Mens College". In 1981, CMC was renamed Claremont McKenna College in honor of founding trustee Donald McKenna.

In November 1989, the father of a CMC student hired a stripper to perform in the college’s dining hall, sparking protests among some students. Then-CMC president Jack Stark told The New York Times he did not wish to comment on whether the incident was "degrading to women".

=== 2000s ===
On September 27, 2007, the college announced a $200 million gift from alumnus and trustee Robert Addison Day to create the "Robert Day Scholars Program" and a master's program in finance. CMC literature professor Robert Faggen sent a letter signed by several other literature professors to CMC president Pamela Gann, saying they were concerned the gift would "distort the college into a single focus trade school." In June 2020, RePEc ranked the college's economics department, the Robert Day School, 4th on its list of top US Economics Departments at Liberal Arts Colleges.

In January 2012, a high-ranking official later identified as former dean of admissions Richard C. Vos was discovered to have been inflating SAT scores by 10–20 points over six years in submissions to the U.S. News & World Report. TIME magazine wrote that “such a small differential could not have significantly affected U.S. News & World Report rankings.” A study commissioned by the college claimed to have found no evidence that the misrepresentations were meant to inflate the school’s ranking in the publication’s annual listings. The controversy prompted Forbes to omit CMC from its yearly rankings in 2013.

In November 2015, the college made national news when the dean of students resigned after students protested what they called a lack of institutional resources for marginalized students; they interpreted an email message the dean had sent a student as implying that minority students did not fit the "CMC mold":

We have a lot to do as a college and a community. Would you be willing to talk to me about these issues? .... They are important to me and the DOS staff and we are working on how we can better serve students, especially those that don't fit our CMC mold.

The same dean's response to an incident of allegedly culturally appropriative Halloween costumes was also seen as lacking. Protests closely followed and were associated with the 2015 University of Missouri protests.

On April 6, 2017, about 300 student protesters (many of whom attended the other Claremont Colleges) blockaded the Marian Miner Cook Athenaeum in an attempt to shut down a speech by conservative pundit Heather Mac Donald. The college livestreamed the talk, as audiences were unable to enter the building. The college disciplined seven of its students who participated in the blockade, including suspending two for a semester and three for a year.

In 2021, the Foundation for Individual Rights in Education ranked CMC first among all U.S. colleges and universities for free speech.

The college's capital campaign "Campaign for CMC: Responsible Leadership" concluded in 2023 and raised more than $1 billion. It helped the college double the size of its campus and expand science programs, faculty, and financial aid.

== Campus ==
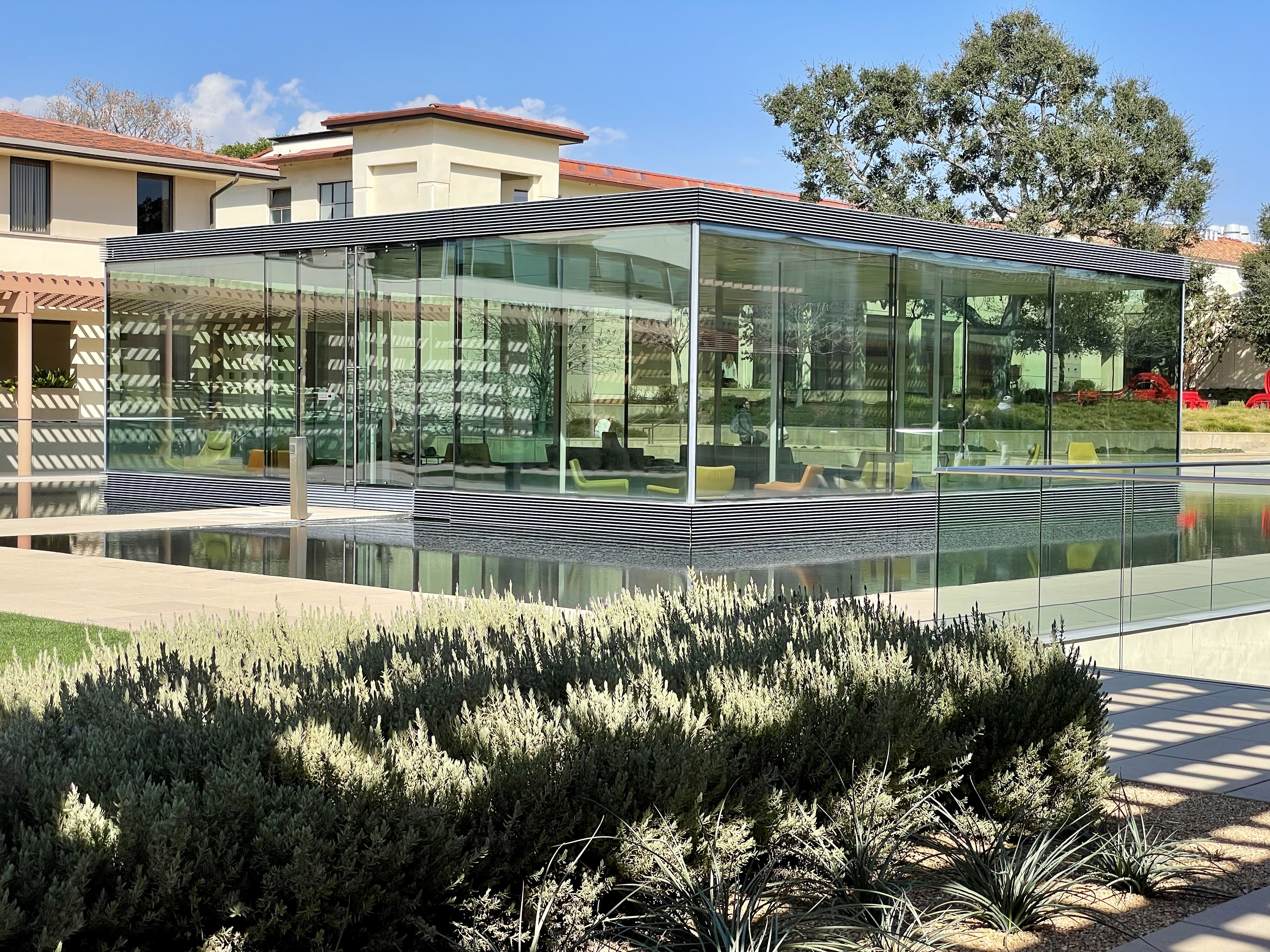
The "Kube", designed by Rafael Viñoly Architects, part of the Kravis Center.

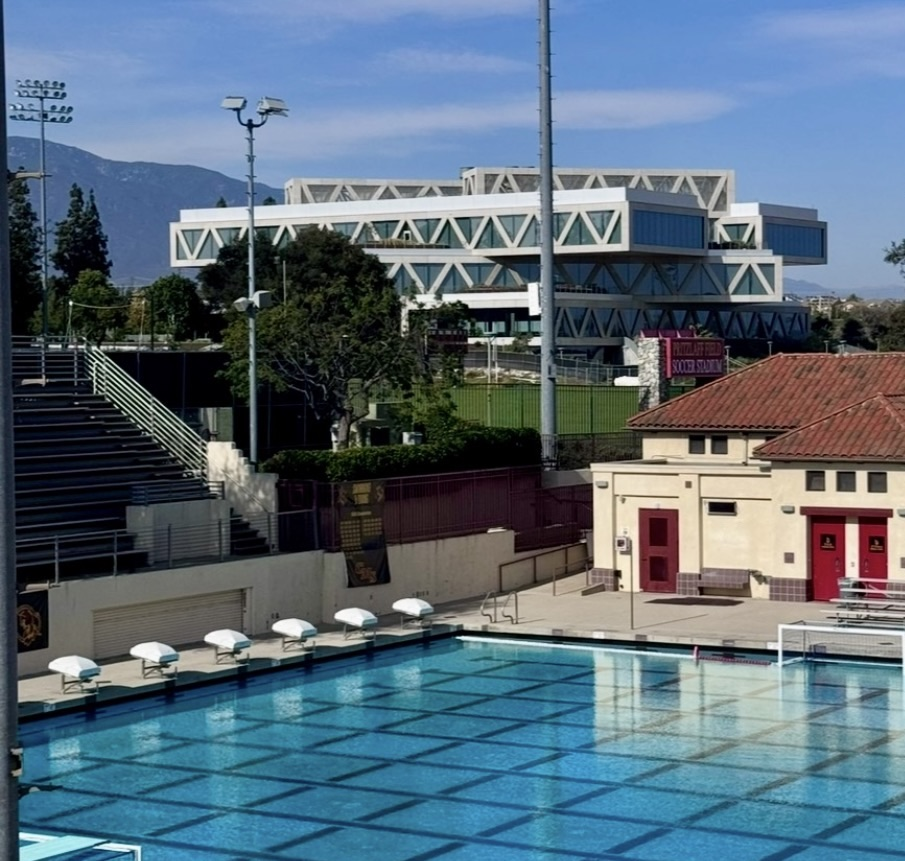
The Robert Day Sciences Center, Axelrood Aquatics Center in foreground

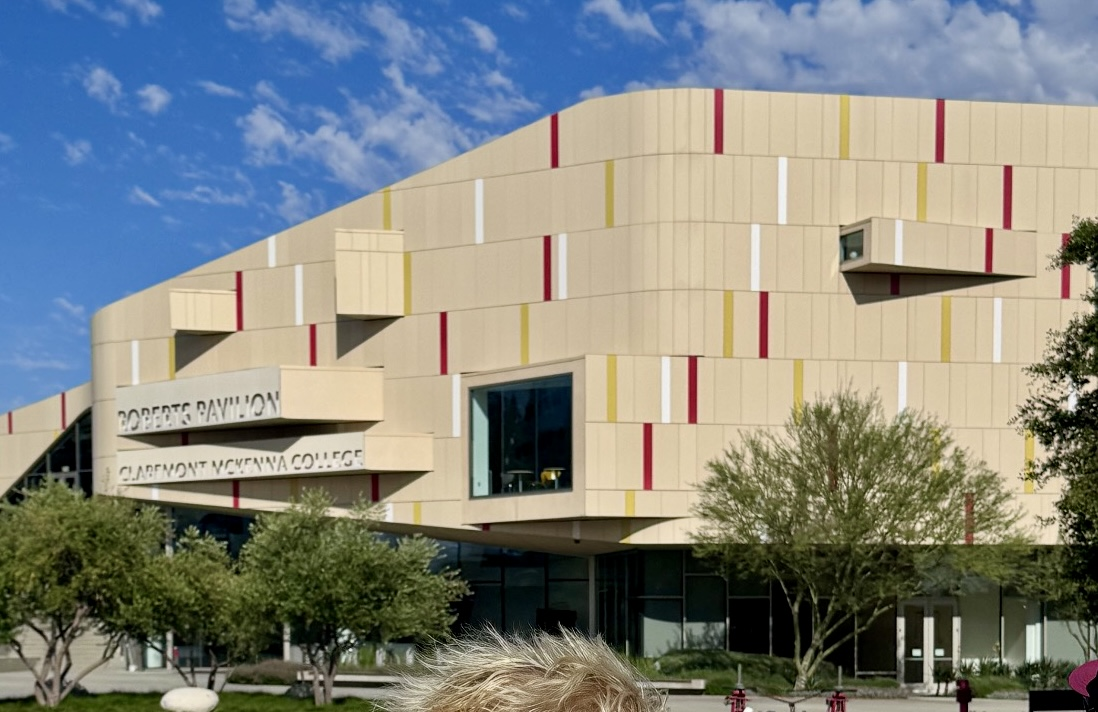
The Roberts Pavilion, fitness & events center

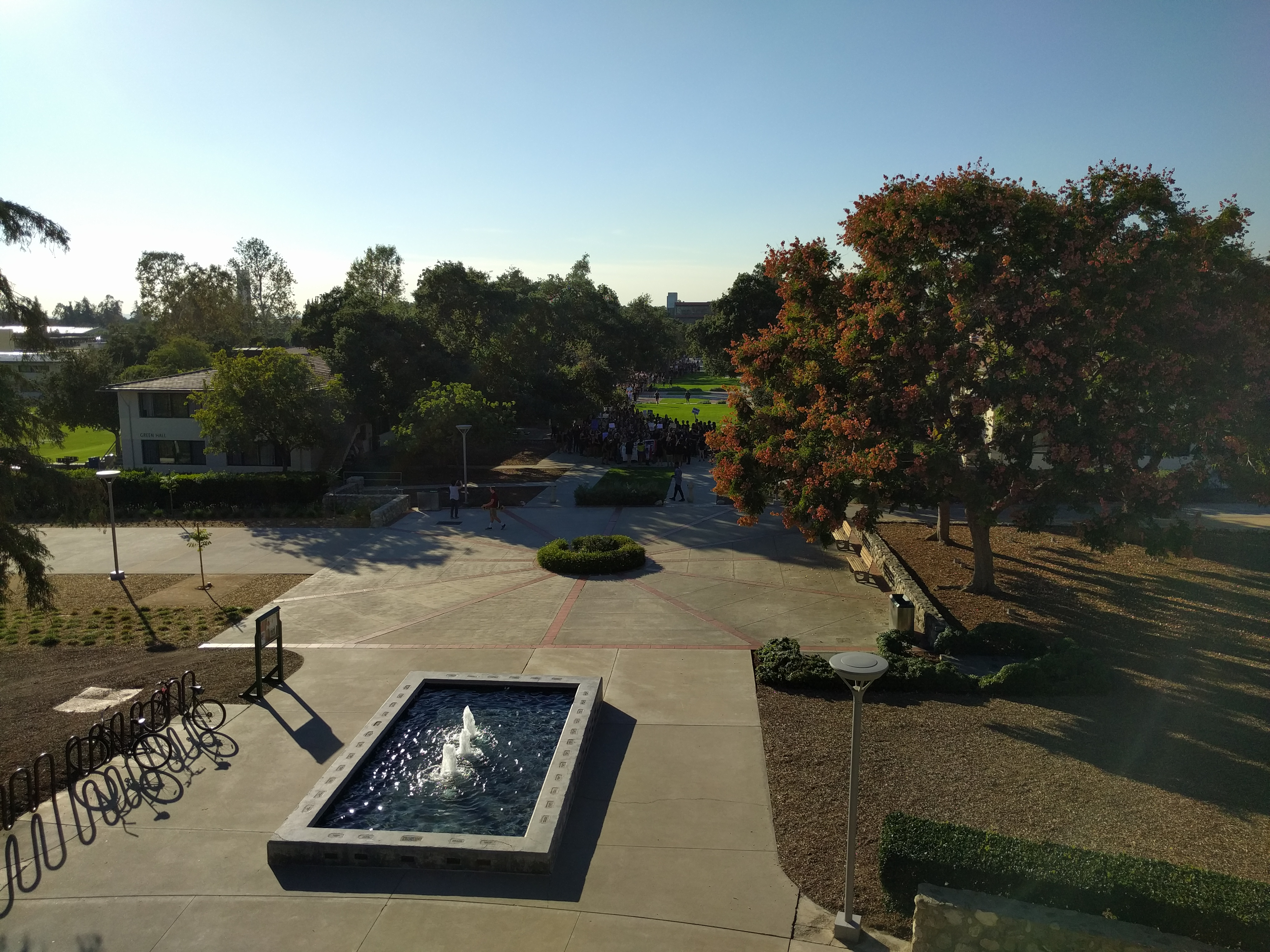
CMC's campus, looking west from the Bauer Center

The predominant architectural style of CMC's campus is California modernism, reflecting the style popular at the time of the college's founding in the 1940s. In recent years, the older, more pedestrian and utilitarian buildings have begun to be replaced by more ostentatious constructions, such as the Kravis Center at the western edge of campus and the $70 million Roberts Pavilion athletics center. The campus also has sculptures and murals by contemporary artists.

== Organization and administration ==
CMC is chartered as a private, nonprofit organization and is a member of the seven-institution Claremont Colleges consortium. Students can take classes at any of the member colleges, and the colleges share libraries, student health, a bookstore, athletic facilities, and various student services. The privately appointed, 40-voting-member board of trustees elects a president to serve as the college's chief executive officer. William C. Dudley is CMC's sixth president. The president has an executive cabinet of nine vice presidents, including a VP of Students Affairs and a VP of Academic Affairs.

=== Presidents ===
1. George C. S. Benson, founding president (1946–1969)
2. Howard R. Neville (1969–1970)
3. Jack L. Stark (1970–1999)
4. Pamela Gann (1999–2013)
5. Hiram Chodosh (2013–2026)
6. William C. Dudley (2026–present)

== Academics ==
=== Rankings ===
Academic rankings

Liberal arts
- U.S. News & World Report: 3
- Washington Monthly: 11

National
- Forbes: 35
- WSJ/College Pulse: 6

Claremont McKenna ranked 6th overall in the The Wall Street Journal/College Pulse 2026 Best Colleges in the U.S. list.

U.S. News & World Report's 2027 rankings rated Claremont McKenna as tied for 3rd-best national liberal arts college in the U.S.

Time ranked Claremont McKenna 9th overall in its 2026–2027 list of "America's Best Colleges".

In 2024, Forbes ranked Claremont McKenna the 19th-best among 500 colleges, universities, and service academies in the nation, in between Brown University and Duke University.

=== Admissions ===
Admission statistics
	2025	2024	2023	2022	2021	2020
Applicants	6,939	6,529	5,799	5,709	5,632	5,306
Admits	655	626	645	591	633	708
Admit rate	9.4%	9.6%	11.1%	10.4%	11.2%	13.3%
Enrolled	335	337	321	322	358	315
SAT range	1480 - 1540	1490 - 1550	1470 - 1530	1450 - 1540	1470	1330 - 1460
ACT range	33 - 35	33–35	33–35	33–35	33	31–34

CMC is classified as "most selective" by U.S. News & World Report. For the Class of 2029 (entering Fall 2025), CMC accepted 655 (9.4%) from a pool of 6,939 applicants.

=== Financial aid ===
Claremont McKenna College spends less on financial aid than its peer institutions, ranking last among the 5Cs and last among U.S. News' top-ranked liberal arts colleges in percentage of budget spent on financial aid.

Tuition for the 2018–19 school year was $54,160 ($27,080 per semester) for a full-time student, and room and board on average $15,930 ($7,965 per semester for double room and 12 meals per week), for a total annual cost of attendance of $70,212.50 with other expected costs included. CMC admits students on a need-blind basis and guarantees to meet all its students' financial needs as determined by the FAFSA and the College Board's CSS Profile. For the 2016–2017 year, CMC awarded $27,021,024 in financial aid. 38.9% of students received need-based financial aid, with an average total grant aid package of $42,445, while 5.8% of students received merit aid, with an average award of $15,744.

The college operates on a semester system and has 12 academic departments, 11 research institutes, and 33 on-campus majors, the most popular of which are economics, government, psychology, economics-accounting, and international relations. CMC students may also major in subjects not offered at CMC if another college in the consortium has such a major. A popular example is computer science, which is offered by both Harvey Mudd College and Pomona College. The student to faculty ratio is 8:1 with an average class size of 18. 85% of the classes have fewer than 19 students. The six-year graduation rate is 93.3%, and the freshman retention rate is 92.7%.

=== Curriculum ===
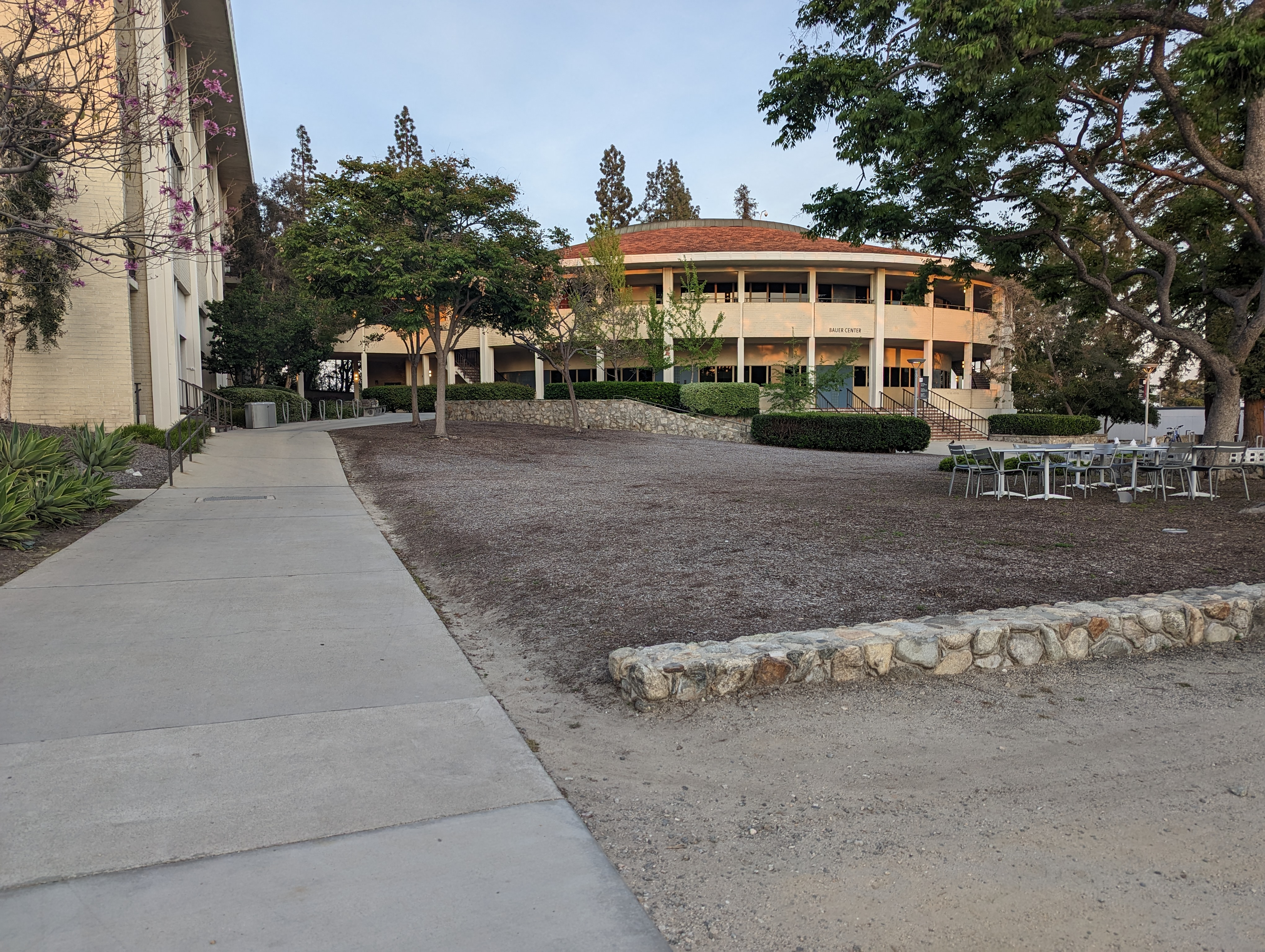
The Bauer Center houses the office of CMC's president (in north building, left) and the Robert Day School of Economics and Finance (in south building, right), as well as an auditorium and other facilities

About one third of the classes students complete are general education requirements. These include a humanities seminar and a writing seminar their first year, three semesters of a foreign language or demonstrated proficiency, a mathematics or computer science course, one laboratory science course and three semesters of a P.E. course or two seasons on a sports team. In addition, students must complete at least two humanities courses and three social science courses, all in areas outside the student's major. All students must complete a senior thesis, which can be either one-semester in length or, to receive departmental honors, two semesters. Claremont McKenna's curricular emphasis is on its social sciences, particularly economics, government, international relations, and psychology. CMC also offers an Oxford-style tutorial Philosophy, Politics, and Economics major with two separate tracks of 14 students each. Other multidisciplinary majors include management engineering, philosophy and public affairs, science and management, econ-accounting, biology-chemistry, and environment, economics, and politics (EEP). CMC also offers the Robert A. Day 4+1 BA/MBA, in which students receive both a BA from Claremont McKenna and an MBA from the Drucker School of Management at Claremont Graduate University in five years. Its most popular undergraduate majors, by 2021 graduates, were:

Economics (90)
Multi-/Interdisciplinary Studies (27)
Political Science and Government (24)
Computer Science (17)
Experimental Psychology (16)
International Relations and Affairs (16)

CMC's science program is offered by the Keck Science Department of Claremont McKenna, Pitzer, and Scripps Colleges. The Keck Science Department offers a double year-long introductory science class to allow more flexibility than the former three-year introductory biology, chemistry, and physics courses most science majors must complete. In 2018, CMC announced that it planned to withdraw from Keck to create its own science department.

Many CMC students study abroad or participate in one of two domestic programs, one in Washington, D.C., and one in Silicon Valley. In both these programs, students complete a full-time internship with a business or government department, remaining full-time students taught at night by CMC professors in the two locations.

More than 75% percent of students attend graduate school within five years of graduation, and those who do not averaged a starting salary of $57,156 for the class of 2014, with average signing bonuses averaging $7,905. Of CMC graduates applying to medical school, 80% get into their first- or second-choice institutions.

== Campus life ==
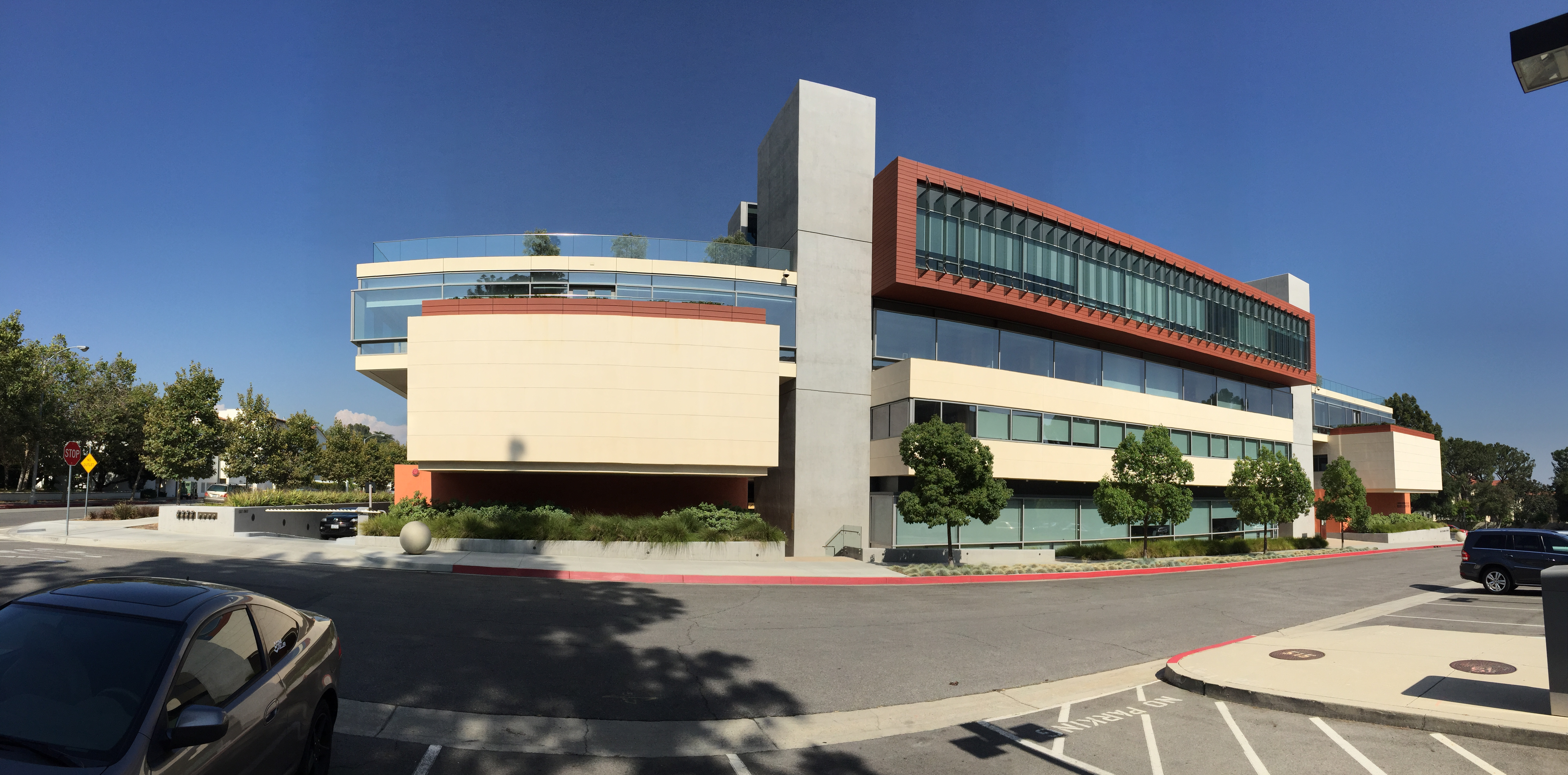
View of the Kravis Center, completed in 2011, from Columbia Avenue.

CMC is known for its active party scene and relatively lenient alcohol policy. Although the college's social scene draws students from the other schools in the consortium and is enjoyed by many, it has also drawn criticism. A 2012 Campus Climate Task Force report published by the school described a "pervasive, 'hyper-masculine' and heteronormative ethos at CMC", adding, "while female students are valued as friends and intellectual colleagues during the day, at night and particularly on the weekends, female students reportedly feel they are objectified targets for sex or 'hook-ups.'" Since 2015, CMC and the other consortium schools have ramped up efforts to reform this culture, hiring a dedicated Title IX staff member, creating the 7c EmPOWER Center, conducting bystander training under the Teal Dot certification and establishing a student-run advocates organization that provides 24/7 support for sexual assault victims.

An abundance of substance-free social programming is available for students, notably including events planned by the College Programming Board, such as the annual Disneyland trip and on-campus arts and service events.

Racial composition of degree-seeking Claremont McKenna College students (2019–2020)
Category	Percent
White, Non-Hispanic	41%
Hispanic/Latino	15%
Asian, Non-Hispanic	12%
Black, Non-Hispanic	4%
American Indian or Alaskan Native, and Native Hawaiian or Pacific Islander, Non-Hispanic	both < 1%
Two or more races	7%
Race or ethnicity unknown	5%

As of fall 2019, student enrollment consisted of 1,335 degree-seeking undergraduate students. CMC students' median family income was $201,300, the second-highest in California, with 58% of students coming from the top 10% highest-earning families and 15% from the bottom 60%. The student body was roughly equally split between men and women, and 21% of students were first-generation. Ninety-five percent of freshmen returned for their second year. Students hailed from 47 US states, D.C., Puerto Rico, Guam, and 46 foreign countries, including 16% of students who identified as nonresident aliens.

=== The Claremont Colleges ===
Claremont McKenna College is a member of the Claremont Colleges Consortium, and most social activities revolve around the five colleges, or "5Cs". Claremont McKenna College, Pomona College, Scripps College, Pitzer College, and Harvey Mudd College share dining halls, libraries, and other facilities throughout the contiguous campuses. All five colleges, along with Claremont Graduate University and the Keck Graduate Institute, are part of the Claremont University Consortium. Notable benefits of being in the consortium include equal access to seven dining halls and 10 additional on-campus eateries, the fifth-largest private library collection in California, interaction with over 7,000 students, access to programs such as Harvey Mudd's Clinic Program and Claremont McKenna's Semester in Washington (DC) program, and the opportunity for housing exchanges with students at other colleges. Most events sponsored by each school are open to students from all the Claremont Colleges, including invited speakers and performers, employment and recruiting events, and social events.

=== Marian Miner Cook Athenaeum ===
The Marian Miner Cook Athenaeum annually hosts more than 100 dinner and lecture events with speakers from a range of disciplines and ideological perspectives, serving as the college's central intellectual and social hub. The Athenaeum hosts speakers four nights a week and serves daily afternoon tea in its library, featuring chocolate-covered strawberries and pastries. Afternoon tea is free to students, faculty, and staff. The Athenaeum has hosted former President Bill Clinton, Archbishop Desmond Tutu of South Africa, former Speaker of the House Newt Gingrich, authors Gore Vidal and Salman Rushdie, cybernetics expert Kevin Warwick, former Attorney General Janet Reno, filmmaker Spike Lee, environmentalist Robert F. Kennedy Jr., former Prime Minister of Israel Ehud Barak, The New York Times columnist Thomas Friedman, Supreme Court Justice Antonin Scalia, U2 frontman and activist Bono, CNN journalist Anderson Cooper, former Deputy White House Chief of Staff Karl Rove, former Senate Majority Leader Tom Daschle, House Minority Leader Kevin McCarthy, New York Times columnist Maureen Dowd, Harvard Professor Danielle Allen, former Secretary of Homeland Security Michael Chertoff, former Secretary of State Condoleezza Rice, retired U.S. Army General Stanley A. McChrystal, and former governor of Massachusetts and U.S. senator Mitt Romney.

=== Housing ===
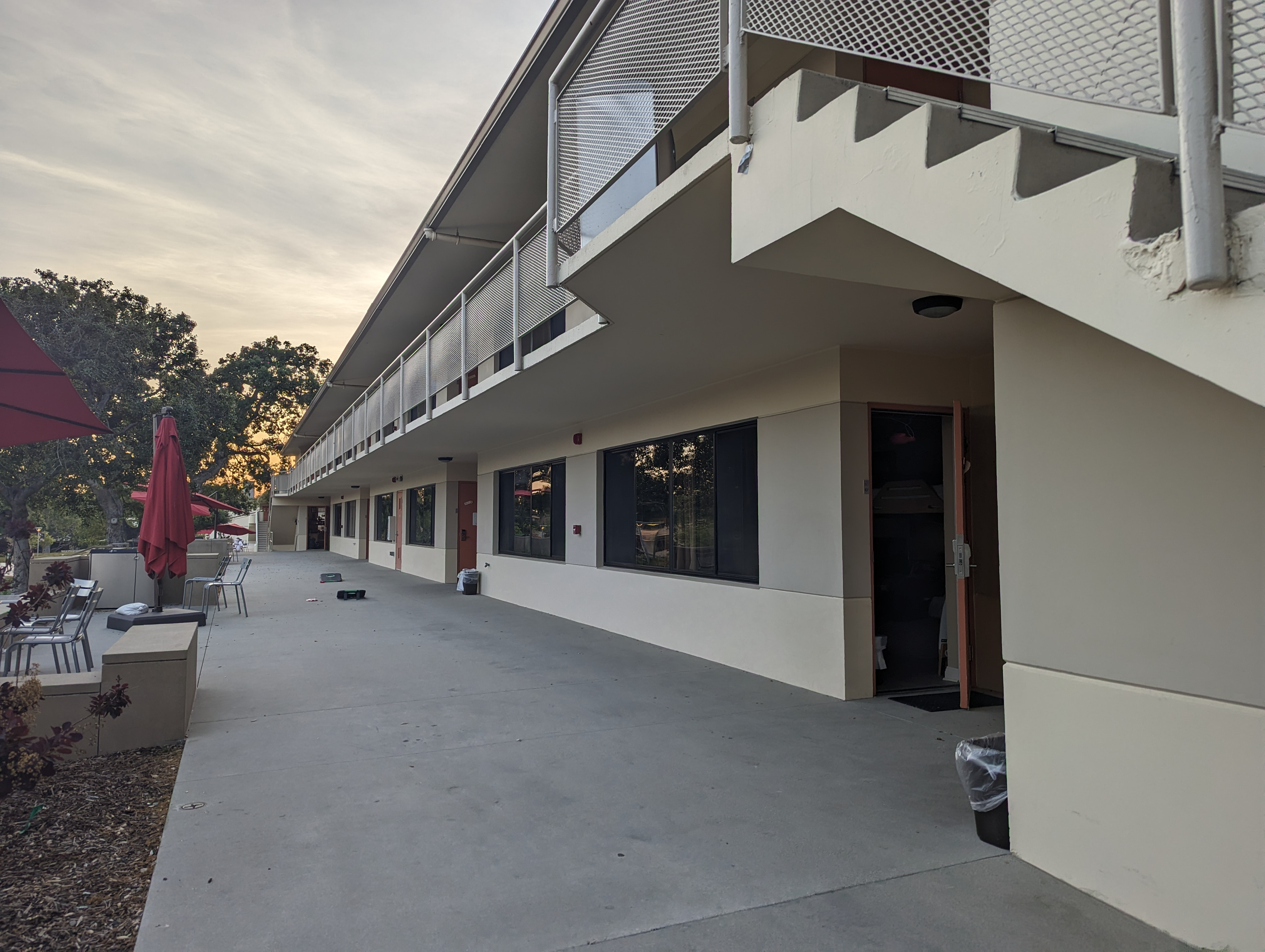
Boswell Hall on North Quad

Student life centers on campus, with 96% of students living on campus; four years of housing is guaranteed. Claremont's dorms are divided into three regions: North Quad, Mid Quad, and South Quad. The student apartments sit on the east edge of campus are occupied primarily by seniors. All dorm rooms are attended to by housekeeping staff every week. North Quad comprises Appleby, Boswell, Green and Wohlford Halls, the campus's first dorms. In north quad, every room opens to the outdoors instead of to an interior hallway. North quad rooms are all doubles grouped into suites of four rooms that share a bathroom.

CMC's Mid Quad is home to Beckett, Berger, Benson, Phillips, Crown, Marks and Claremont Halls, which feature long interior corridors, double and single rooms, large shared-bathroom facilities and all-dorm lounge areas. Berger, Claremont and Benson Halls are connected, and make up a larger building known on campus as BCB. As of 2022, Claremont Hall has been renamned to Valach Hall, therefore changing BCB into BVB.

The tallest buildings in Claremont are "The Towers", Auen, Fawcett, and Stark Halls, which make up South Quad. Each tower has seven floors with approximately twelve students per floor. Each floor has a common area and a large shared bathroom, while there is also an all-dorm lounge area on the ground floor. Stark Hall, the newest of the South Quad dorms, is substance-free. Auen and Fawcett underwent complete interior renovations in the summer of 2008.

Crown Hall

The Student Apartments lie to the east of the college's athletic facilities and to the west of Claremont Boulevard. Each apartment is divided into four bedrooms and two bathrooms. Until recently, half the apartments were reserved for men and half for women, and apartments were allotted based on credits. In any given year, most of CMC's 260–300 seniors can live in the apartments.

=== Student government ===
The Associated Students of Claremont McKenna College (ASCMC) is the official student government of Claremont McKenna College. ASCMC is composed of an executive board and a student senate. The executive board consists of both elected and appointed positions. It is chaired by the President, and meets weekly to discuss long-term projects and endeavors. Permanent committees led by members of executive board include the events team, the diversity & inclusion committee, and the residential life committee. Additionally, each class president has a cabinet to carry out class programming. The Senate is chaired by the executive vice president of ASCMC, and is tasked with passing resolutions to influence institutional policy, funding student-led initiatives, and bringing in administrators and other college stakeholders for town hall discussions. Senate has four standing committees: administrative affairs & appropriations (AAA), environmental affairs, campus improvements, and student engagement.

=== Affinity Groups ===
CMC has numerous identity-based clubs and organizations, including 1 Gen, for first generation college students), Asian Pacific American Mentors, Black Student Associations, ¡Mi Gente! (for Latino students), Sexuality and Gender Alliance, Women's Forum, and International Connect. These clubs and organizations host a variety of support programming and social events for students to participate in.

=== Student journalism ===
Towers at South Quad

CMC attracts many students with an interest in journalism. Its student publications include the following:

- The Student Life: The Student Life (abbreviated TSL) was founded in 1889. It is the oldest college paper in Southern California and the largest media organization at the Claremont Colleges, and is generally regarded as the colleges' publication of record. It prints weekly on Fridays, featuring news, opinions, lifestyle articles, and sports coverage of all five undergraduate Claremont Colleges. It is jointly funded by the 5C student governments.
- The Golden Antlers: The Golden Antlers is a satirical and humorous campus publication founded in 2012. Although Claremont McKenna is its host, it is staffed by students from all five Claremont Colleges.
- The CMC Forum: The Forum is the oldest CMC-specific publication on campus. It features campus news, opinions, and lifestyle articles. Although originally a newspaper, the Forum is now solely an online news source.
- The Claremont Independent: The Independent, founded in 1996, is a magazine of conservative and libertarian writers that has frequently produced stories about the political culture of the Claremont Colleges that have been picked up by national conservative media outlets and drawn intense criticism from many students. It is funded entirely through private donations.

== Athletics ==
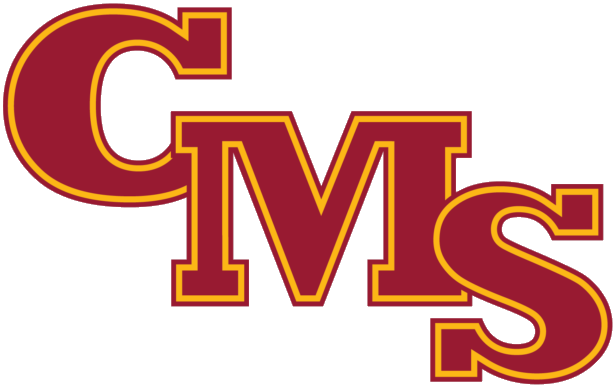
Claremont-Mudd-Scripps athletics wordmark

CMC athletes compete alongside their counterparts at Harvey Mudd College and Scripps College as the Claremont-Mudd-Scripps Stags and Athenas.

The teams joined the NCAA Division III in the Southern California Intercollegiate Athletic Conference (SCIAC) in 1958. The mascot for the men's teams is Stanley the Stag, and the women's teams are the Athenas. Their colors are cardinal and gold.

=== Roberts Pavilion ===
In 2016, a new 144,000 square-foot recreation facility, named the Roberts Pavilion, was completed. It is named for CMC trustee and alumnus George R. Roberts and serves as the central fitness and events center for the college. The facility includes an arena with seating for 1,850 which serves as the home court for the CMS basketball teams and women's volleyball team.

=== Roberts Campus Sports Bowl ===
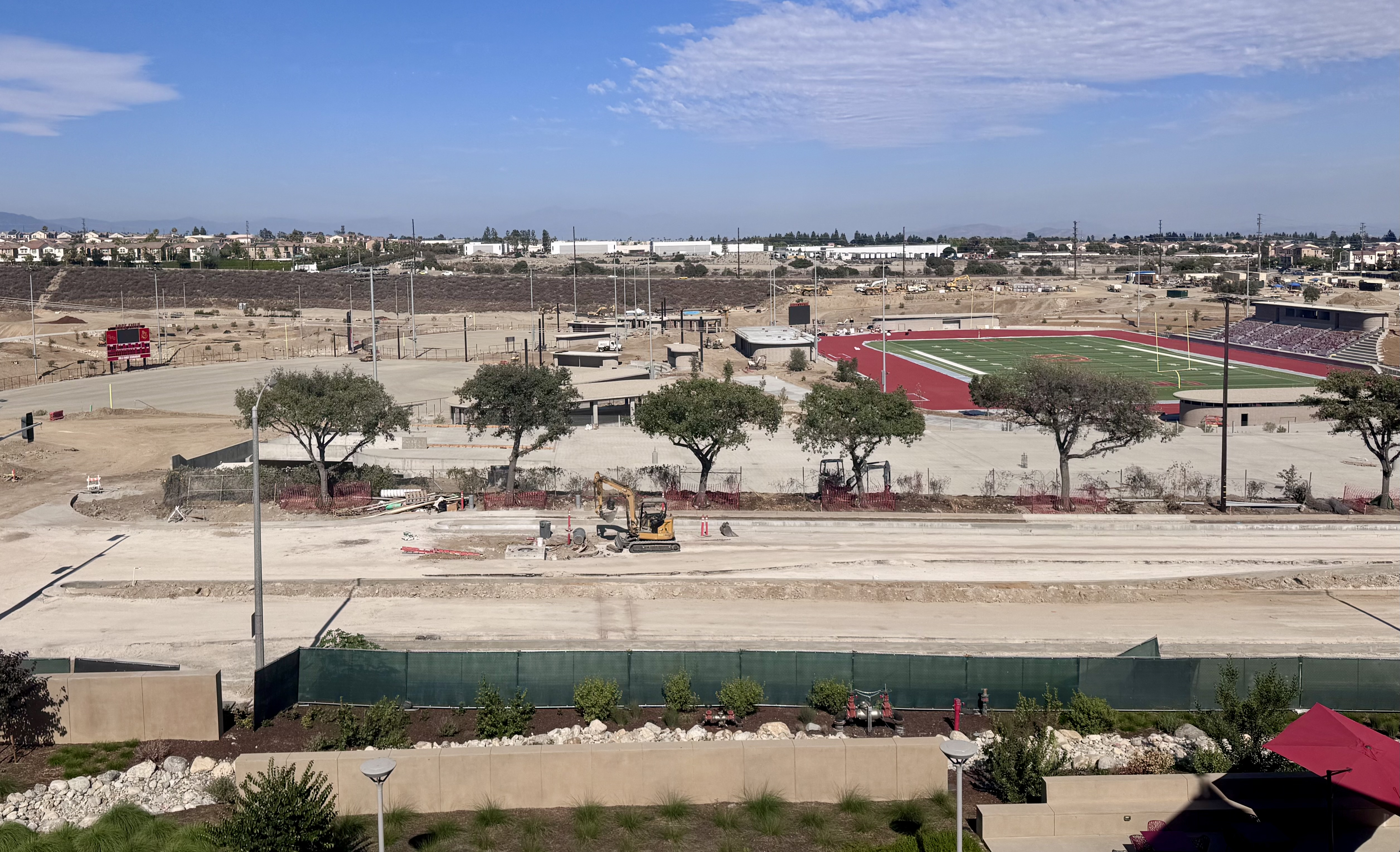
The Roberts Campus Sports Bowl under construction

Roberts Campus Sports Bowl Football Field, under construction

The Roberts Campus Sports Bowl is being built on a 75-acre parcel east of Claremont Boulevard and is named after George Roberts. It will include facilities for baseball, softball, track and field, women's lacrosse, and football as well as a golf practice facility, running paths, additional parking, and facilities for the college's ROTC program. Future plans include a new aquatics center and additional soccer and rugby fields.

== Traditions ==
- The "Madrigal Feast" was an annual dinner held in the Marian Miner Cook Athenaeum. Both current students as well as alumni typically attended. Guests were treated to a medieval-themed feast, complete with wassail and a spirited musical performance put on by other students in medieval dress. This 26 year tradition was suspended in 2009.
- The Associated Students of Claremont McKenna College host a "Monte Carlo" night which doubles as the school's homecoming dance. This tradition dates back to 1949.

Several of Claremont McKenna College's traditions are water-related:

- At noon on the due dates of senior theses, the students turn in their theses to the registrar, after which they are given a bottle of champagne by the registrar. In recent years, the class president has provided the champagne. The students spend the remainder of the afternoon in the fountains at the school, drinking, singing, celebrating and enjoying the warm California sun.
- At midnight of a student's birthday, their friends will throw them in the fountains in the center of campus while singing "Happy Birthday", a tradition known as "ponding".

== The Claremont University Consortium ==
All seven colleges are part of the Claremont University Consortium, also known as "the 7 Cs". Together the campuses cover over 300 acres (120 ha) and enroll over 6,000 students. In addition there are over 3,500 faculty and staff and more than 2,500 courses available.

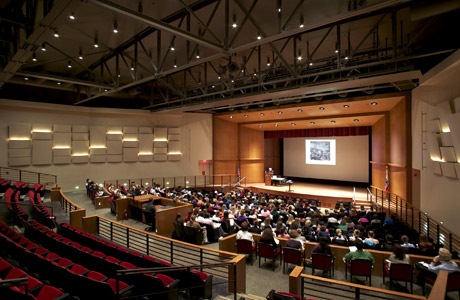
Garrison Theater at Scripps College

Student life revolves around the colleges as they interact socially and also share seven dining halls, four main libraries and other facilities spread throughout the campuses. Notable facilities include:

- Honnold/Mudd Library and the Libraries of the Claremont Colleges, the largest collection of any liberal arts college
- W.M. Keck Science Center
- Monsour Counseling Center
- Huntley Bookstore

Students attending Claremont McKenna can enroll in up to 2/3 of their classes at the other undergraduate colleges and can also major at any other college if the major is not offered at CMC. This is the general academic policy at the schools and is meant to give students the resources of a larger university while still maintaining the qualities of a small, liberal-arts college.

== Research institutes ==
CMC sponsors 12 on-campus research institutes and centers. They seek to produce new research and publications while involving undergraduate students in rigorous academic work.

- The Berger Institute for Individual and Social Development
- The Financial Economics Institute
- The Mgrublian Center for Human Rights
- The Gould Center for Humanistic Studies
- The Keck Center for International and Strategic Studies
- The Kravis Lab for Civic Leadership
- The Kravis Leadership Institute
- The Lowe Institute of Political Economy
- The Roberts Environmental Center
- The Rose Institute of State and Local Government
- The Salvatori Center for the Study of Individual Freedom in the Modern World
- The Randall Lewis Center for Innovation and Entrepreneurship

== Fundraising ==
Claremont McKenna completed what was then the largest fundraising campaign ever initiated by a liberal arts college, raising $635 million from 2000 to 2013. The campaign for Claremont McKenna fulfilled commitments in five priorities:

- $110 million for students: need-based financial aid and merit scholarships, internships, research, speaker series and other experiences
- $110 million for faculty: chairs, research and new curricula
- $100 million for facilities: new buildings, renovations and master planning projects
- $200 million for the Robert Day Scholars Program
- $80 million for The Fund for CMC: operating costs

As part of the campaign, the college built the Kravis Center, a building that includes classrooms, faculty offices and research areas. Designed by Rafael Viñoly, it was completed in 2011. It is named after 1967 alumnus Henry Kravis of Kohlberg Kravis Roberts, who donated $75 million for the building.

== Notable alumni and faculty ==
=== Alumni ===
Notable alumni include:

- Political consultant Thomas B. Hofeller
- Former Chairman and CEO of TCW Group Robert Day (1965)
- Founding partner of Kohlberg Kravis Roberts & Co. (KKR) George Roberts (1966)
- Chairman and CEO of Abercrombie & Fitch Co. Michael S. Jeffries (1966)
- Founding partner of Kohlberg Kravis Roberts & Co. (KKR) Henry Kravis (1967)
- 60th Chaplain of the United States House of Representatives, Patrick J. Conroy (1972)
- Chairman of Hyatt Thomas Pritzker (1972)
- California Congressman and House Rules Committee Chairman David Dreier (1975)
- 59th Mayor of Dallas, Texas and former CEO of Kaplan, Inc. Tom Leppert (1977)
- Founder of Perella Weinberg Partners and former head of European Markets at Goldman Sachs, Peter Weinberg (1979)
- Chief Investment Officer of Cascade Investment and the Bill & Melinda Gates Foundation Michael Larson (1980)
- S&P Global President and CEO Douglas Peterson (1980)
- Co-Director of the Center on Work, Technology, and Organization at Stanford University, Pamela J. Hinds (1982)
- Governor of Montana Steve Bullock (1988)
- CEO of Accenture Julie Sweet (1989)
- New York Times White House correspondent Michael D. Shear (1990)
- Social entrepreneur and founder of Ethos Water Peter Thum (1990)
- Dean of University of Iowa College of Engineering Harriet B. Nemhard (1991)
- CEO of Samba TV and co-founder of BitTorrent, Inc. Ashwin Navin (1999)
- Entrepreneur Daniel Kan, founder and CPO of Cruise (2009)
- Anti-abortion activist David Daleiden (2010)
- Novelist Jack Houghteling (2014)
- Actor and comedian Robin Williams (did not graduate)
- Los Angeles City Attorney Michael Feuer (transferred)

=== Faculty ===
Notable faculty include:

- Political scientist Minxin Pei
- Political scientist Ward Elliott
- Senior Economist at the Presidential Council of Economic Advisers Eric Helland
- Charles Kesler, noted conservative scholar
- Arabic scholar Bassam Frangieh
- Author Jamaica Kincaid
- Political scientist Ken Miller
- Historian Wendy Lower
- Psychologist Diane Helpern
- Political scientist and environmental economist William Ascher
- Presidential speechwriter and comedian Mort Sahl
- German popular historian Golo Mann
- Government consultant and felon Alan Heslop, founding director of the Rose Institute and former dean of faculty
- American poet Henri Cole
- Political scientist John J. Pitney, Roy P. Crocker Professor of Politics
- Computational biologist Ran Libeskind-Hadas serves on the Executive Board of the Computing Research Association and the National Science Foundation CISE Advisory Council and is the founding chair of Kravis Department of Integrated Sciences.
