= San Antonio Canyon =

Coordinates: 33°27′34.39″S 71°59′15.27″W

San Antonio Canyon (Spanish: Cañón de San Antonio) is a submarine canyon located offshore San Antonio, Valparaíso Region, Chile. The canyon crosses almost the whole continental shelf. It has a slope of 2° from its upper parts near the coast to 80 km offshore, then slope increases to a mean of 6.3°. The main channel has a large tributary coming from the south.
