= Traditions of Pomona College =

Aspect of Pomona College culture

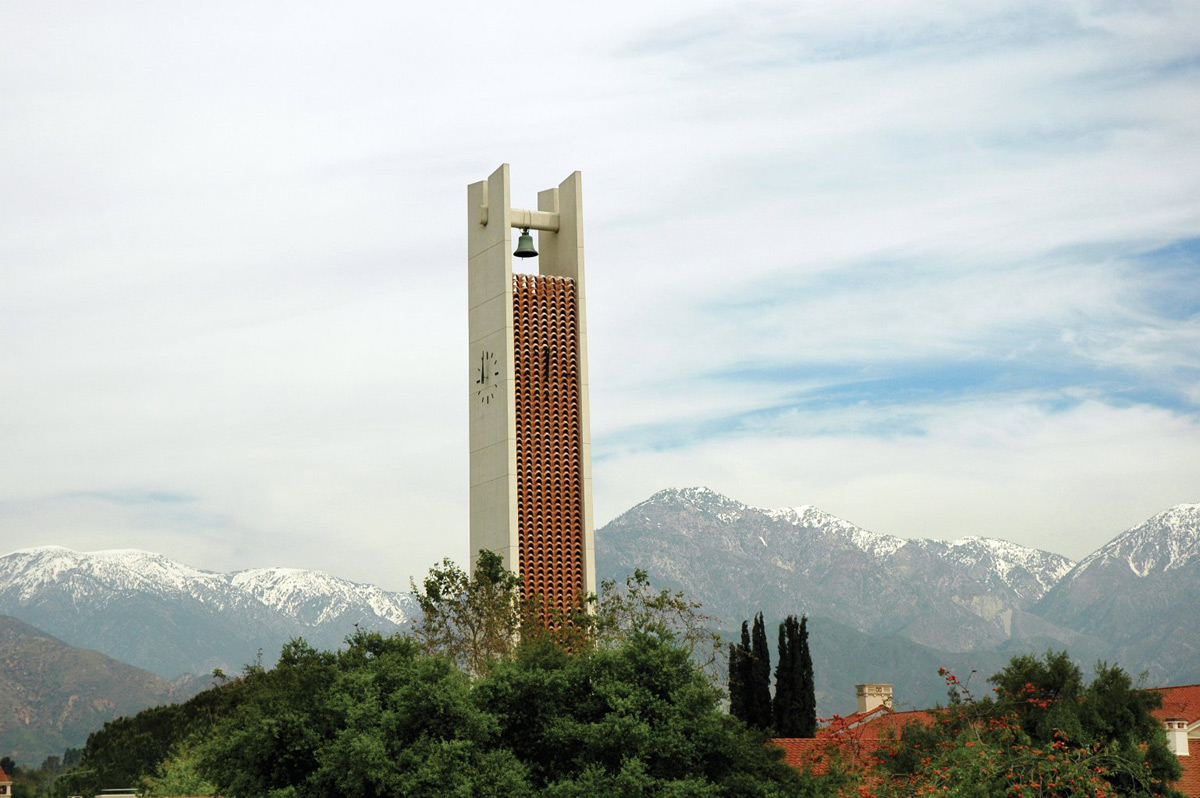
The Smith Memorial Tower chimes on the 47th minute of the hour, a reflection of Pomona College's obsession with the number 47.

Numerous traditions have been established at Pomona College, a highly selective liberal arts college in Claremont, California, since its founding in 1887. They have varying levels of popularity, longevity, and institutional recognition. Taken together, they are a significant component of the school's culture and identity, promoting social cohesion among students and other community members.

Early traditions at Pomona, such as Pole Rush and banner springs, often took the form of rivalries between different class years, and frequently involved hazing. After World War II, these were gradually replaced with college-wide traditions, including the college's most intensely carried tradition, a reverence for the number 47, which began in 1964. Overall, the Yale Daily News characterizes Pomona's traditions as "often more quirky and fun than steeped in history and legend."

== Extant traditions ==
=== 47 reverence ===
The number 47 has historical implications to the college and has been incorporated into various aspects of campus life. The tradition began in the summer of 1964, when two students, Laurie Mets and Bruce Elgin, conducted a research project seeking to find out whether the number occurs more often in nature than would be expected by chance. They documented various 47 sightings, and professor Donald Bentley produced a false mathematical proof that 47 was equal to all other integers. The number became a meme among the class, which spread once the academic year began and snowballed over time.

Notable 47 sightings include the fact that Pomona is located off of exit 47 of Interstate 10, and the fact that the largest residential building on campus, Mudd-Blaisdell (formally Florence Carrier Blaisdell and Della Mullock Mudd Hall, a title with 47 characters), was completed in 1947 and contains a staircase with 47 balusters.

Many Pomona alumni have deliberately inserted references to 47 into their work. Joe Menosky (class of 1979), a writer for Star Trek: The Next Generation, inserted mentions of 47 into nearly every episode he wrote, a practice that has been picked up by other Star Trek writers. Pomona hosts a community service–oriented celebration every April 7 (abbreviated 4/7 in the U.S.). In the early 2010s, the college's clock tower was set up to chime on the 47th minute of the hour.

=== Cup dropping ===
Pomona's Frary Dining Hall has an open refectory with a vaulted ceiling and tiled floor. The acoustical properties of these attributes create a loud clattering sound when one of Frary's plastic cups is dropped. Whenever someone accidentally drops their cup, it is traditional for everyone else in the dining hall to finish their drink and do likewise.

=== Mascot ===
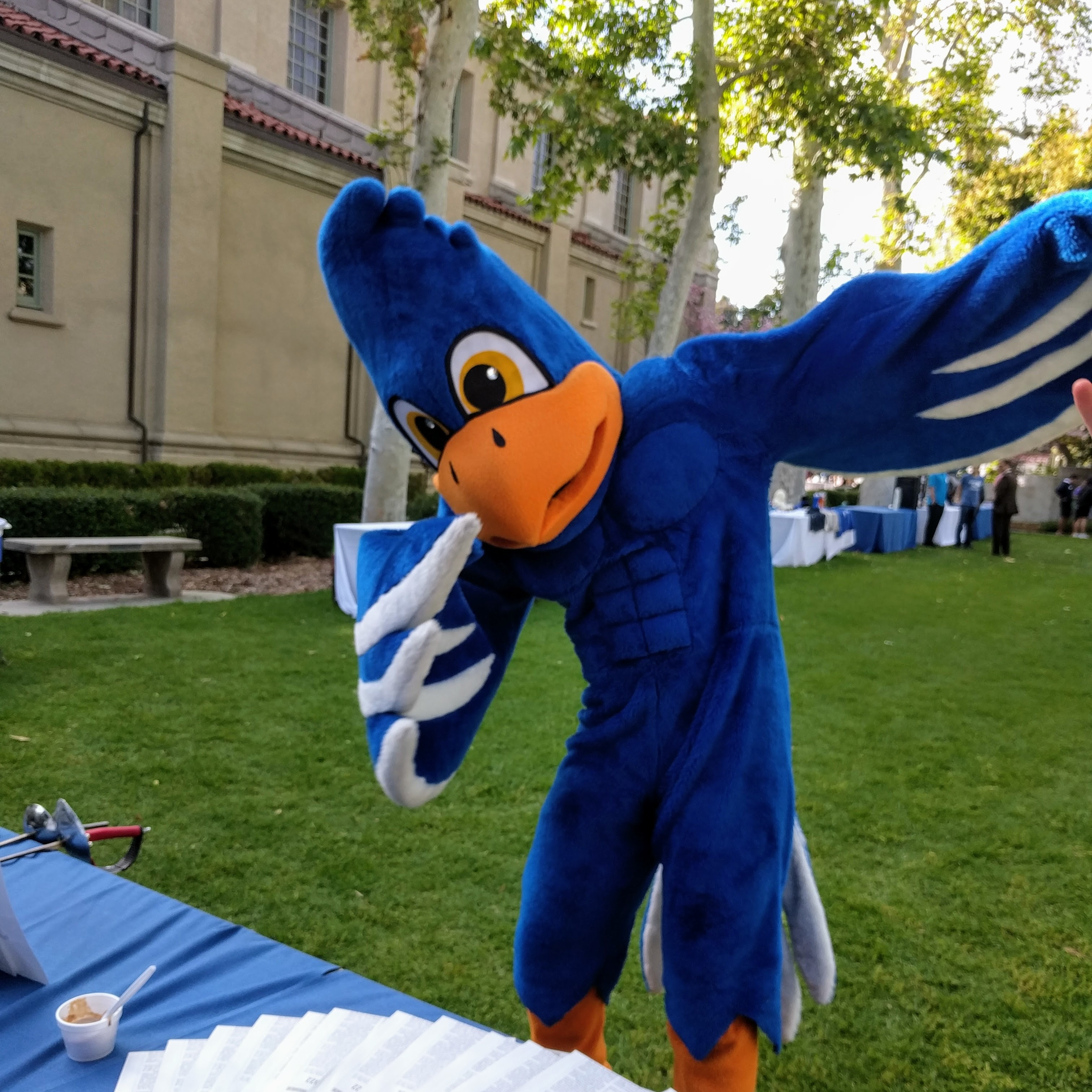
The third iteration of the Cecil the Sagehen costume (adopted in 2017) dabbing

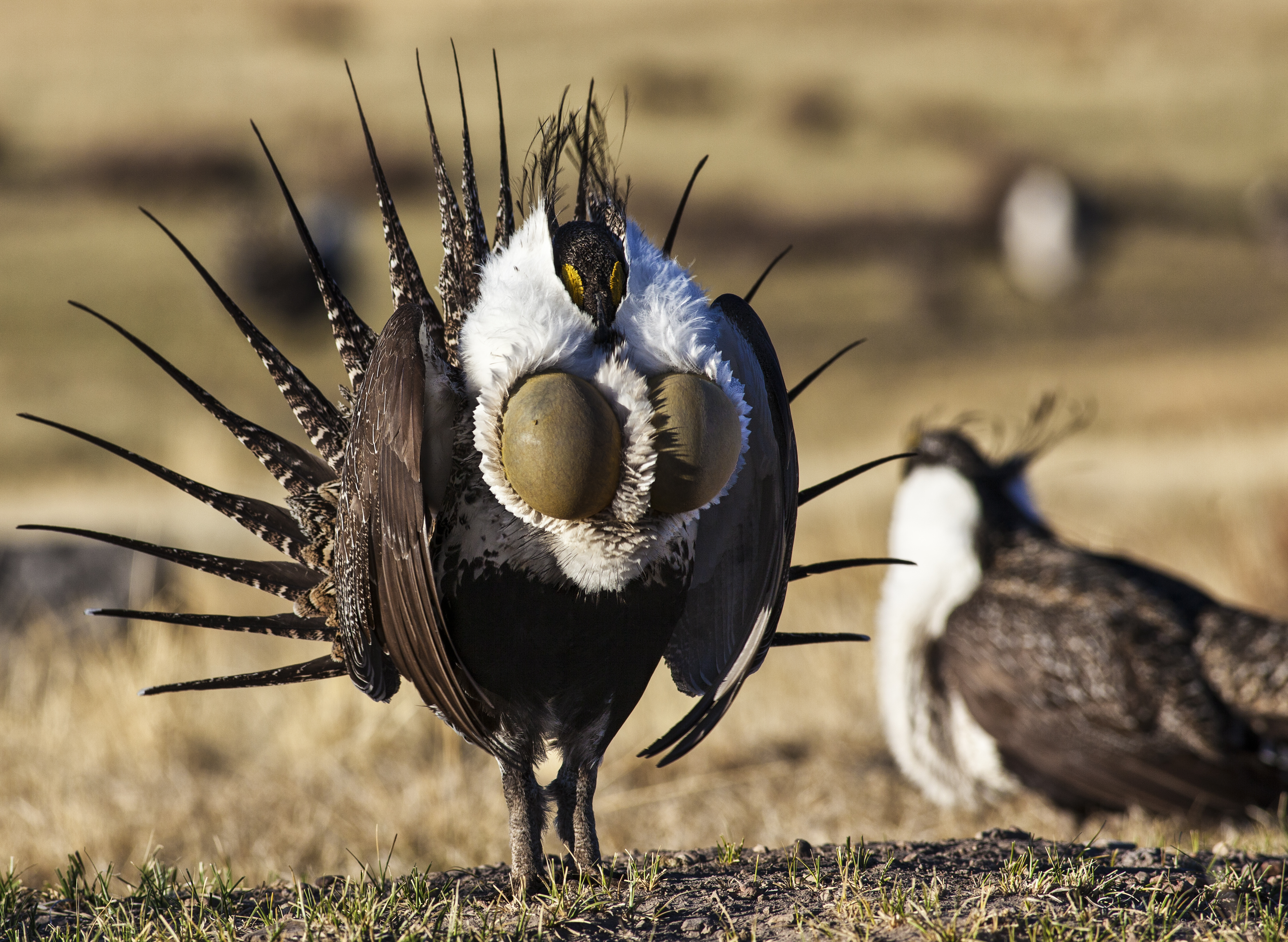
A male sagehen with its gular sacs inflated during a courtship ritual

The official mascot of the Pomona-Pitzer Sagehens is Cecil the Sagehen, a greater sage-grouse (Centrocercus urophasianus). The bird is a large ground-dweller native to the western United States (although not Southern California), and is distinguished by its long, pointed tail and complex lek mating system. It is named after the sagebrush on which it feeds.

Pomona-Pitzer is the only team in the world to use the Sagehen as a mascot, and it is often noted for its goofiness. Rather than in the grouse's natural brown and white colors, the mascot is rendered in the team's official colors, blue (for Pomona) and orange (for Pitzer).

The precise origin of the nickname is unknown. Pomona competed under a variety of names in its early years, including "the Blue and White" and "the Huns". The first known appearance of "Sagehens" was in a 1913 issue of The Student Life newspaper, and in 1918 it became the sole nickname. Later Pomona-Claremont began using it, and it is now the nickname for the combined Pomona-Pitzer team. The first known reference to "Cecil" was made in the 1946 Metate (Pomona's yearbook).

=== Mufti ===
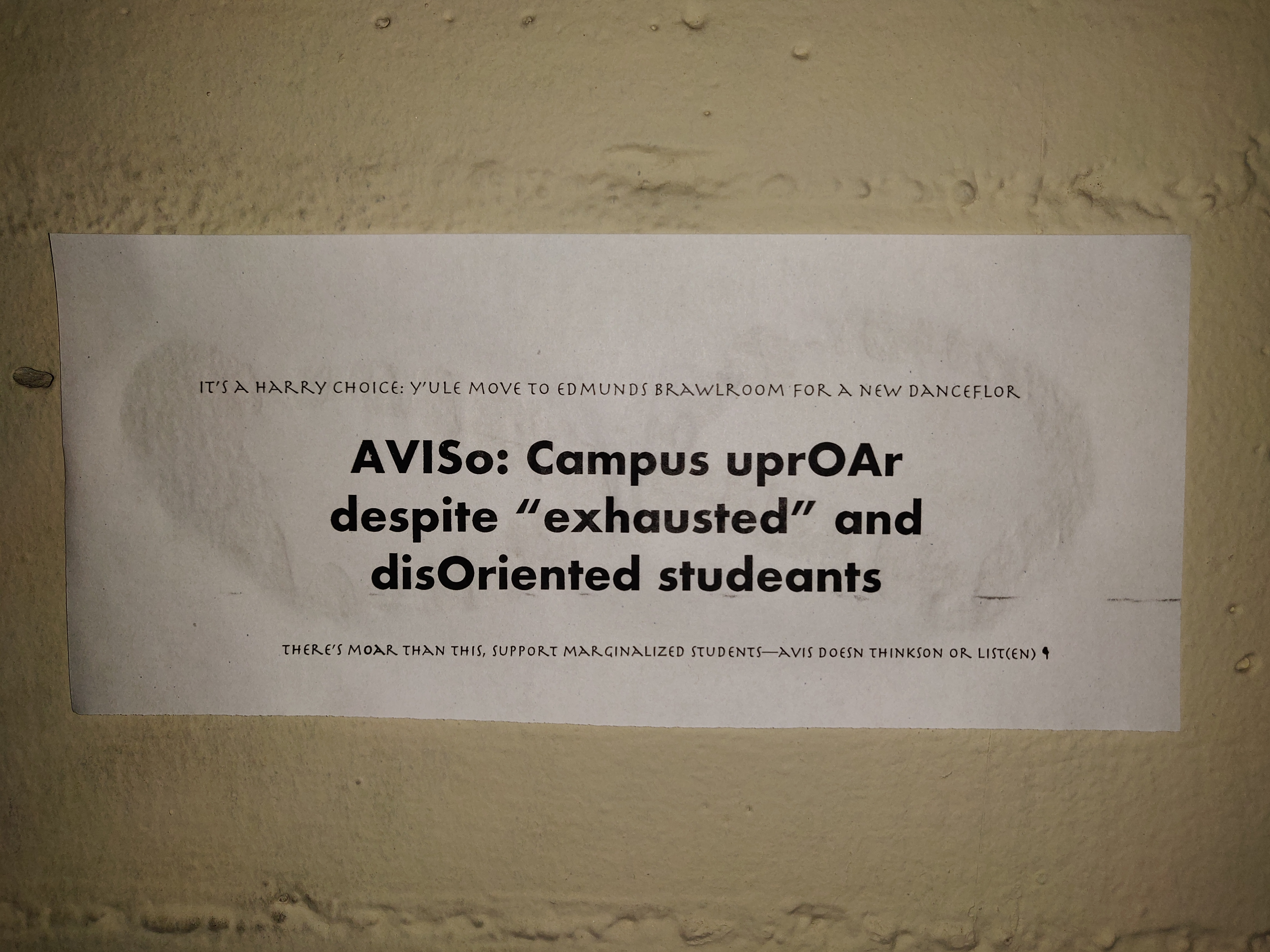
A Mufti burger

Pomona's secret society is called Mufti, meaning "out of uniform". It is known for gluing small sheets of paper around campus with cryptic puns offering social commentary on campus happenings. The society originated in 1958 and was initially the work of class of 1960 graduates Martha Tams Barthold, Jean Wentworth Bush Guerin, Alice Taylor Holmes and Thomasine Wilson. The tradition was passed down to young women (and later men) from subsequent classes and has waxed and waned in activeness over the years. Its 3.5 in × 8.5 in (89 mm × 216 mm) postings, known as "burgers", typically contain three lines, with the center one being most prominent. They are glued to surfaces around campus using a figure eight shape.

=== Orientation Adventure ===
As part of Pomona's 10-day orientation, incoming students spend four days off campus completing an "Orientation Adventure" or "OA" trip. Options in recent years have ranged from backpacking in Sequoia National Forest to sea kayaking in Channel Islands National Park. Begun in 1995 and required for all students beginning in 2004, the OA program is one of the oldest outdoor orientation programs in the nation.

=== Pranks ===
External image
- The Bridges Auditorium frieze, altered to include Frank Zappa

Pomona students have committed a number of pranks over the years that have entered into college lore. Notable pranks include:

- In 1911, two students snuck into the dean's office and buried the large safe there beneath the floorboards; it was not discovered until several weeks later.
- In 1968, students stole the Christmas tree from Frary Dining Hall and moved it to the top of Smith Clock Tower.
- Chemistry professor R. Nelson Smith (class of 1938, taught 1945–1982) fostered an active prank culture in his department, which included office modifications such as replacing a desk chair with a toilet, turning all furniture upside down, and replacing all furniture with a gerbil and its food cage.
- In 1975, students replaced the frieze honoring Frédéric Chopin on Bridges Auditorium with one honoring Frank Zappa in advance of a concert he performed there.
- In 1978, students suspended a 13-foot (4.0 m) sailboat from the ceiling of Frary Dining Hall.
- In the 1990s, students covered up the door to the mathematics faculty offices to make it look seamlessly like a wall.

Pomona students have also observed or participated in many notable pranks at nearby Harvey Mudd College. Harvey Mudd is well known for its active prank culture, including stunts such as the 1986 heist of Caltech's cannon. Some Pomona pranks have targeted neighboring Claremont McKenna College, the college's main athletic and ideological rival.

=== Ski-Beach Day ===
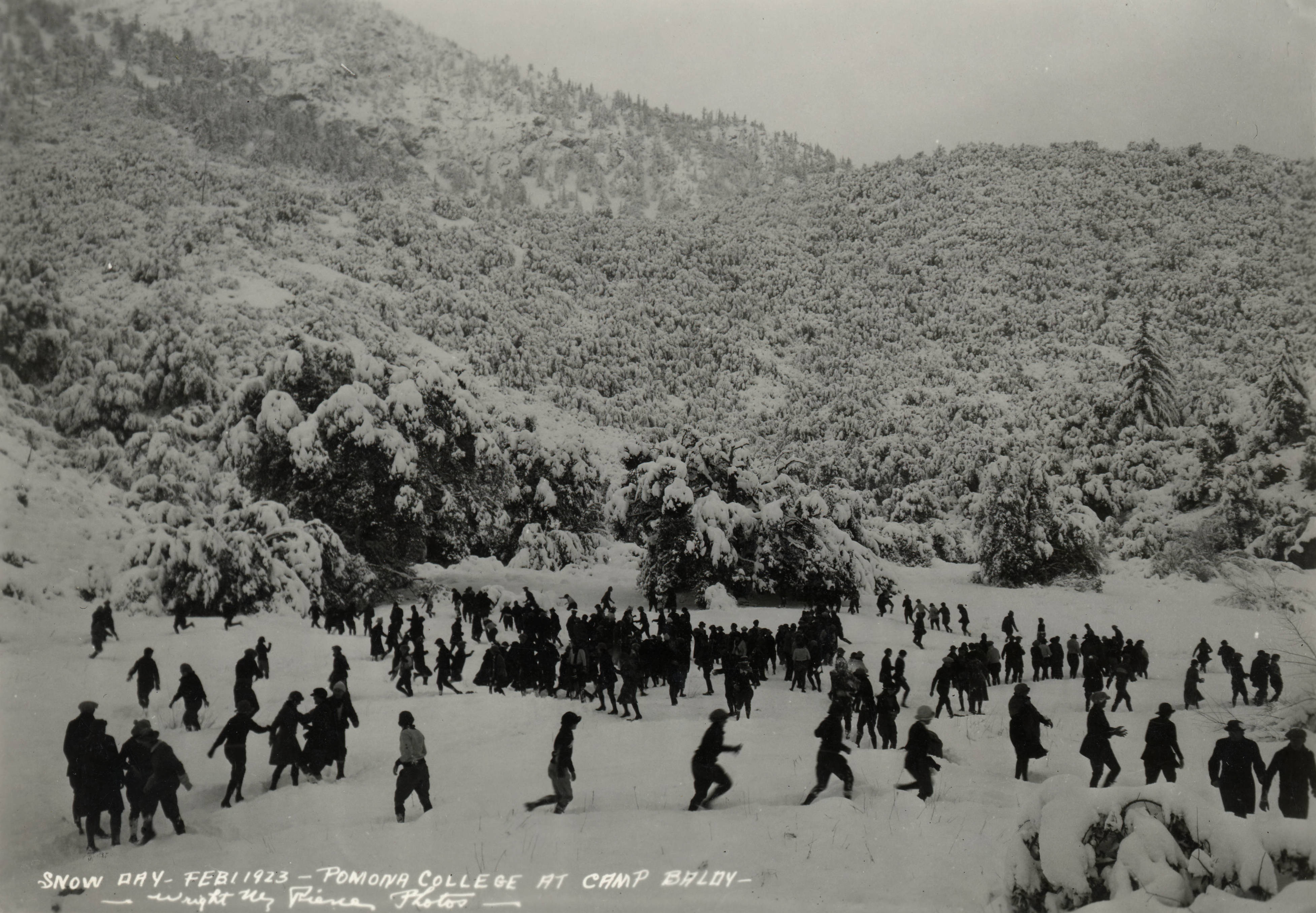
Pomona's 1923 Snow Day, the predecessor to Ski-Beach Day

Pomona College takes advantage of its location near the San Gabriel Mountains and within driving distance of the Pacific Ocean to host an annual "Ski-Beach Day" each spring. The tradition dates back to November 1891, when the college established an annual picnic in the mountains. The outings began to focus on winter activities in the 1920s, and switched to a beach trip during a period of low snowfall in the 1940s, before later combining the two. In its current form, students board a bus in the morning and are driven to a local ski resort where they ski or snowboard. After lunch, they are bused down to an Orange County or Los Angeles County beach for the rest of the day.

=== Sponsor groups ===
All incoming students are placed into a sponsor group, with 10–20 peers and two or three upperclass "sponsors", who are tasked with easing the transition to college life but not enforcing rules (a duty given to resident advisors). The program dates back to 1927 for women, and was expanded in 1950 to include men.

Sponsor groups vary in their level of social cohesion, with some becoming friend groups. They often share activities such as fountaining, a tradition in which sponsor groups carry someone to a campus fountain on their birthday and throw them in. Members of one's sponsor group are referred to as "spiblings".

=== Through the gates ===
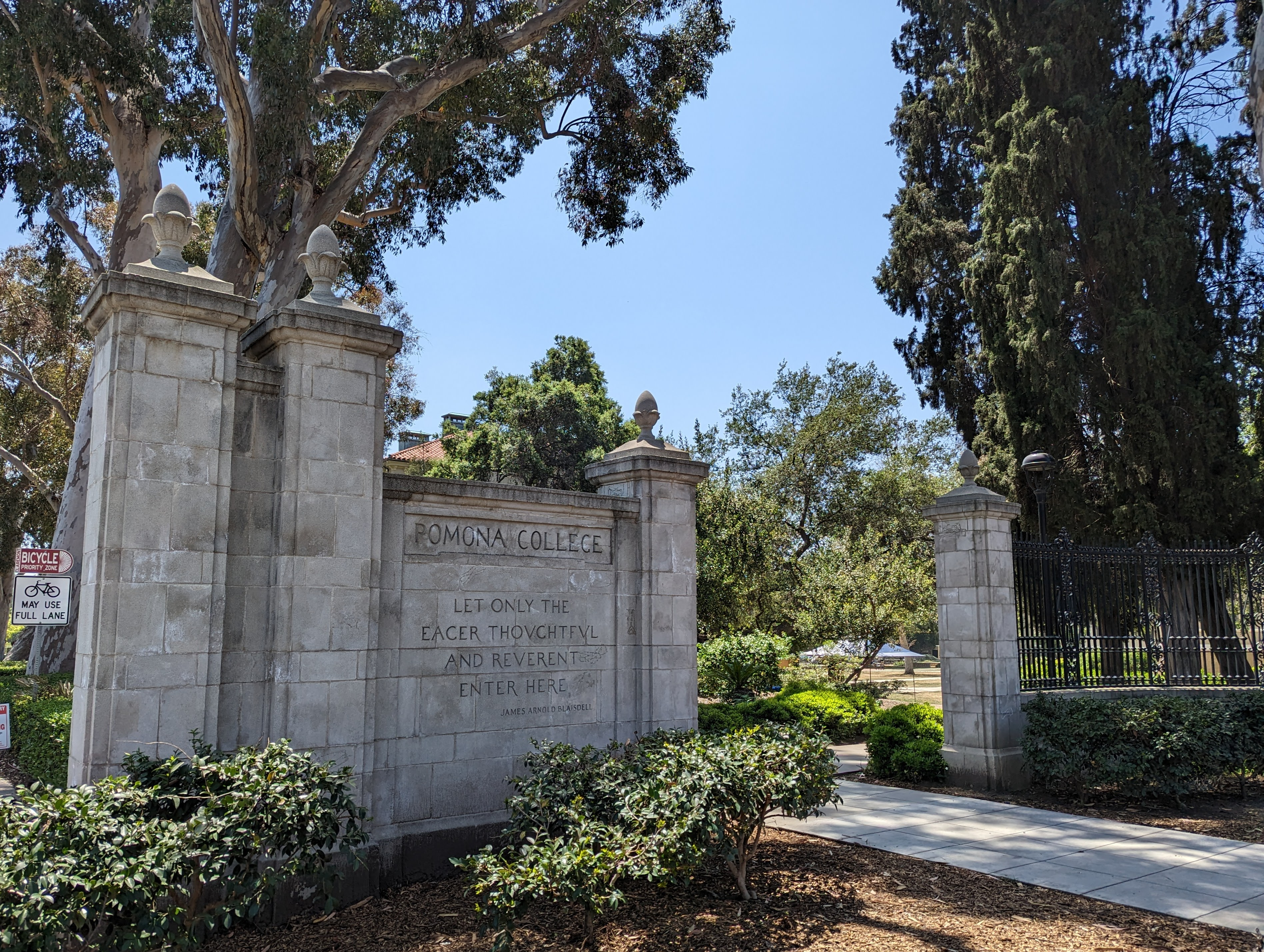
The college gates

At the intersection of Sixth Street and College Avenue are the college gates, built in 1914, which mark the historical northern edge of the campus. They bear two quotes from Pomona's fourth president, James A. Blaisdell. On the north is "let only the eager, thoughtful and reverent enter here", and on the south is "They only are loyal to this college who departing bear their added riches in trust for mankind". Per campus tradition, enrolling students walk south through the gates during orientation and seniors walk north through them shortly before graduation.

=== Walker Wall ===
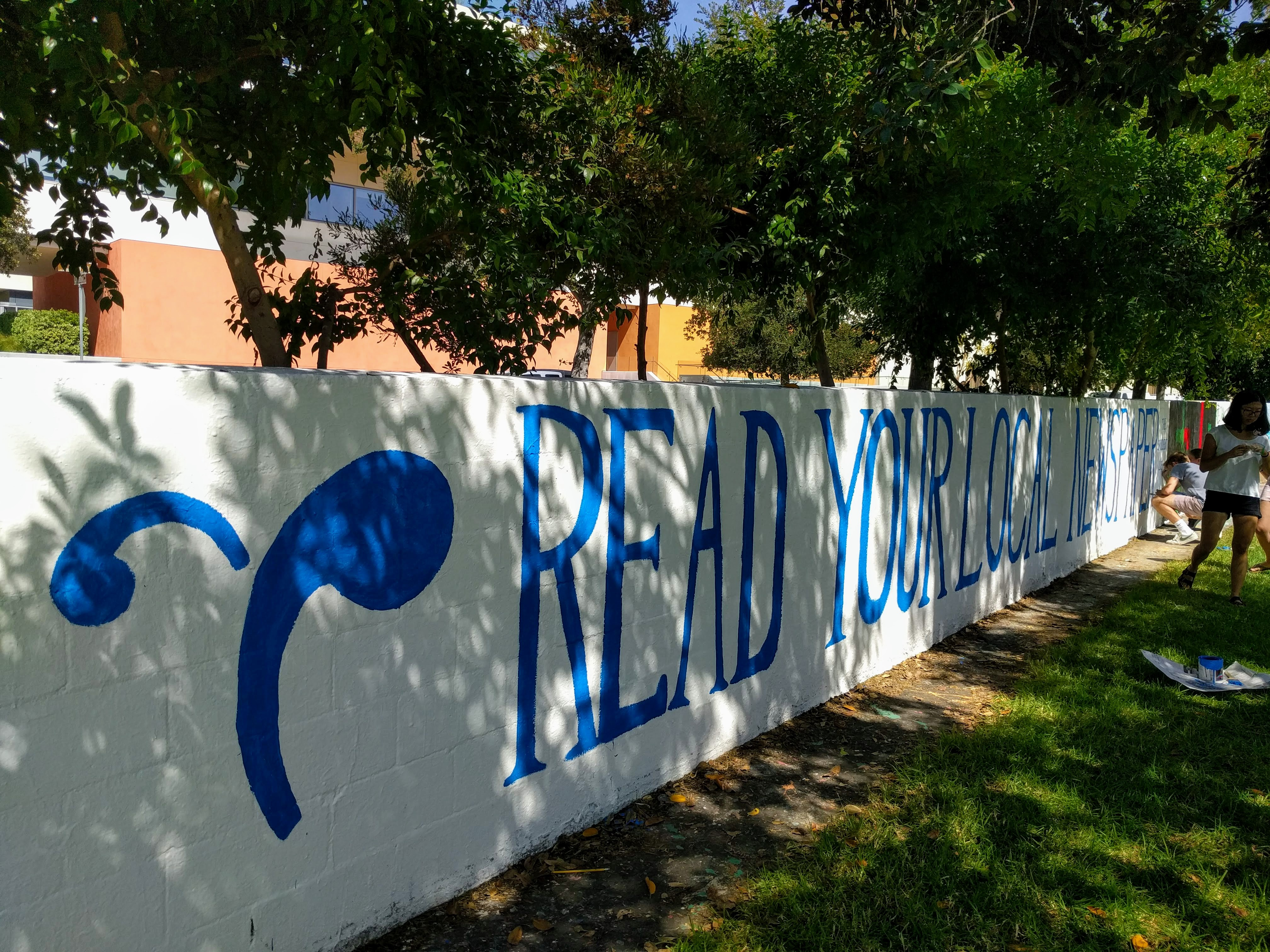
Students paint a message on Walker Wall in September 2018 advertising The Student Life

In 1956, Pomona constructed a curved 200-foot-long (61 m), 5-foot-tall (1.5 m) cinder block wall along a portion of the northern edge of its campus as a flood barrier. In the early 1970s, students began painting messages on the wall, and Pomona recognized it as a free speech wall in 1975 after the message "Free Angela" was painted on it, referring to the imprisonment of Angela Davis. Over the years, provocative postings on the wall have spawned a number of controversies. In recent years, sponsor groups have painted the wall during orientation, and since 2009 the Queer Resource Center has painted the entire wall annually for Gaypril.

== Defunct traditions ==
=== College songs ===
A number of songs written by Pomona students and faculty have been associated with the college.

The college's alma mater, "Hail, Pomona, Hail", was written by student Richard Loucks in 1910 or 1911. In 2008, it was discovered that it may have been originally written to be sung as the ensemble finale to a student-produced blackface minstrel show performed on campus. A commission recommended that it be replaced, but many alumni argued against its retirement, noting that the lyrics themselves are not objectionable. Additionally, research from Rosemary Choate (class of 1963) concluded from primary materials that Loucks likely did not actually write the song for the show and was misremembering when he recalled having done so half a century later. Ultimately, president David Oxtoby decided to retain the song but to stop singing it at convocation and commencement. Since then, it has largely disappeared from living memory among current students.

Another college song, "Torchbearers", was written in 1896 by Francis Fulkerson (class of 1896) and professor Arthur Bissell, inspired by a Cahuilla festival that professor Frank Brackett and David Barrows (class of 1894) had attended. Originally titled "Ghost Dance", its name was changed and lyrics re-written by professor Ramsay Harris in 1930. In 1932, the Pomona men's glee club won the first and only National Glee Club Championship with their performance of the song. In 2009, its lyrics were modified to remove culturally appropriative aspects, but lingering concerns led to its retirement from active repertoire in 2015, and it is likewise unrecognized by most current students.

Several other less well-known Pomona songs continue to be sung by the college's choral program.

=== Banner springs ===
Every class at Pomona creates its own class banner. In this longstanding tradition, the first-year class would present, or "spring", its banner in a public forum in which it could be seen by the majority of the student body, and then try to whisk it away to the Ghosts, a mentor group organization, before the second-years could capture it. The Ghosts would then judge whether or not the banner spring was legitimate according to a complicated set of rules. Notable banner springs occurred at the Fox Theater in Pomona (1932) and in front of a train carrying fans returning from a football game (1949). The 1949 spring was preceded by an attempt made from a helicopter, which was declared illegitimate because the banner could not be presented from a moving vehicle.

=== Oxy bonfire ===
External image
- The 1939 Oxy bonfire, featuring "Beat Oxy!" signs

During the era when Pomona's primary athletic rival was the Occidental Tigers, a bonfire and rally was held prior to the homecoming football game with the college, traditionally assembled by first-year men. A corresponding "Pomona bonfire" at Occidental remains extant.

=== Pole Rush ===
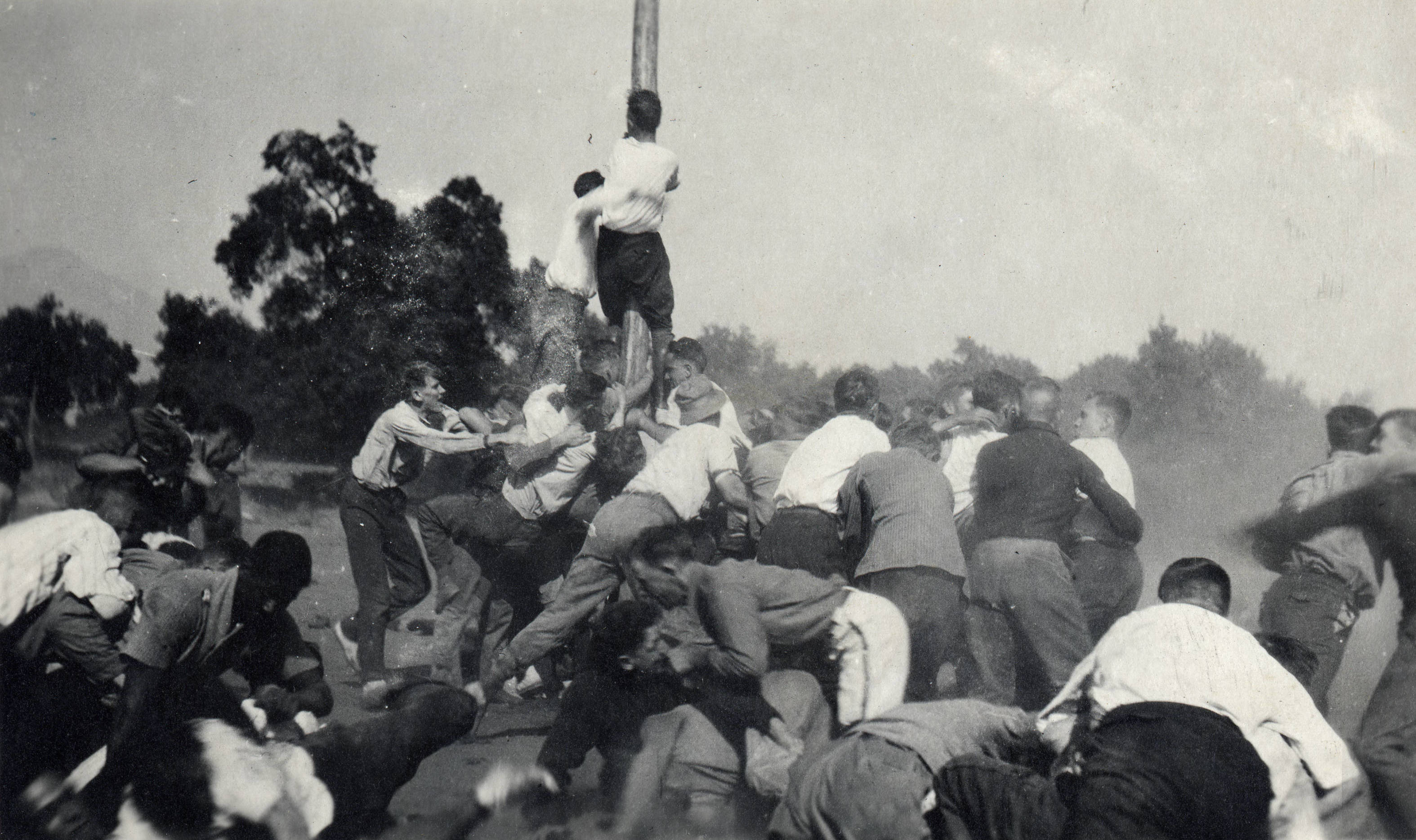
The 1914 pole rush

The annual Pole Rush, a competition between first-years and second-years, began shortly after Pomona was founded and was last held in 1926. It was a brawl in which men from both classes attempted to be the first to get their class's colors to the top of a pole.

=== Sophomore Arch ===
The Clark III dormitory, completed in 1930, includes a short tunnel connecting Sixth St. to Bixby Plaza. For a number of years after its completion, the second-years forbade first-years to pass through it, and it has been known ever since as the Sophomore Arch.

=== Weigh-in ===
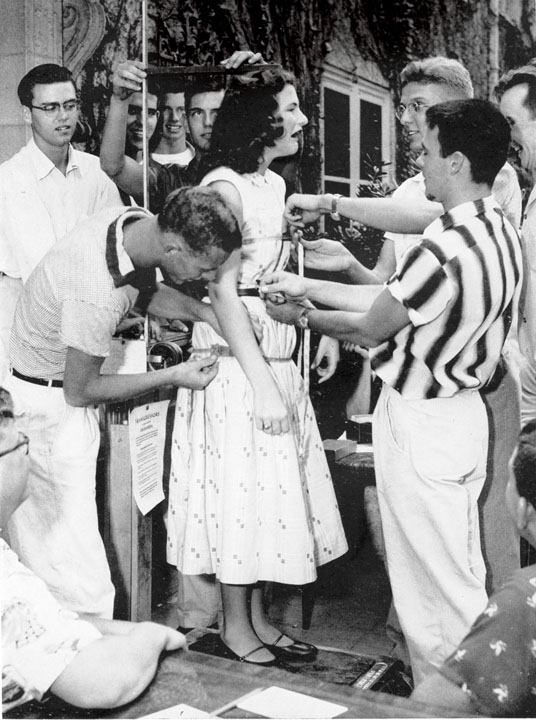
An anguished female student endures the weigh-in, 1953

Sometime after World War II, Pomona's football team began an annual practice of forcibly weighing and measuring the proportions of the incoming first-year women during orientation, and then compiling and distributing booklets with the information. Sponsors objected to the tradition in 1972 and forced the team to end it. The team attempted to revive it a year later but were foiled by the sponsors and dean of students Jean Walton.
