= Bridges Auditorium =

Music venue at Pomona College, California, U.S.

Mabel Shaw Bridges Music Auditorium

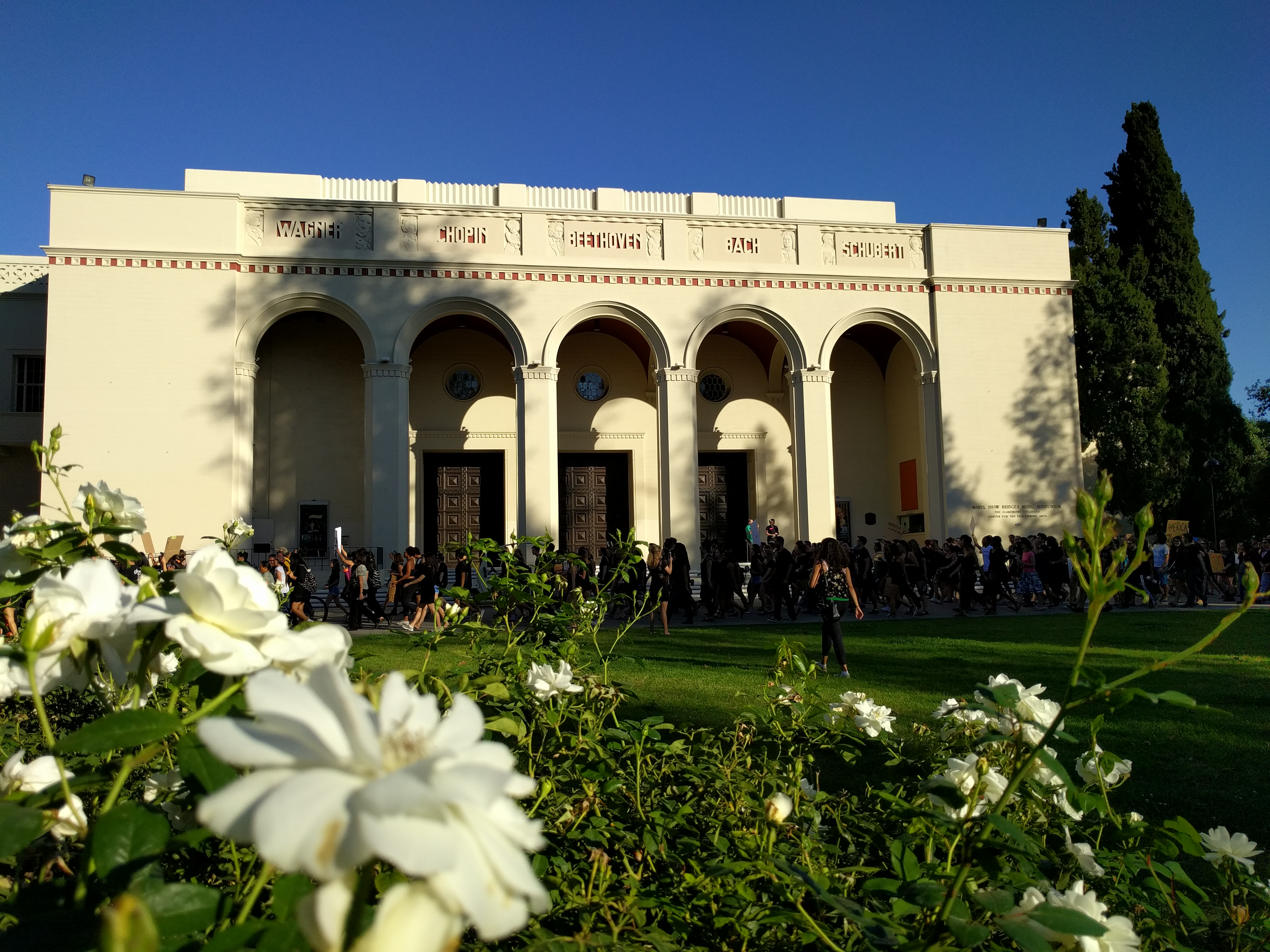
- Alternative names: Big Bridges

General information
- Type: Auditorium
- Architectural style: Renaissance Revival
- Location: 450 N. College Way, Claremont, California, United States
- Coordinates: 34°05′53″N 117°42′44″W
- Named for: Mabel Shaw Bridges
- Construction started: 1930
- Completed: 1931
- Opened: 1932
- Renovated: 1975
- Cost: $650,000
- Owner: Pomona College

Height
- Height: 28.9 m (95 ft)

Technical details
- Material: Steel, reinforced concrete
- Floor area: 60,000 square feet (5,600 m^{2})

Design and construction
- Architect: William Templeton Johnson

Other information
- Seating capacity: 2,494
- Public transit: Claremont

Website
- bridgesauditorium.com

The Mabel Shaw Bridges Music Auditorium, more commonly known as Bridges Auditorium or Big Bridges (to distinguish it from nearby Bridges Hall of Music, known as Little Bridges), is a 2,500-seat auditorium at Pomona College in Claremont, California, United States. It was designed by William Templeton Johnson in the Renaissance Revival style with Art Deco elements and opened in 1932. It hosts a variety of performances for the college and outside groups.

== History ==
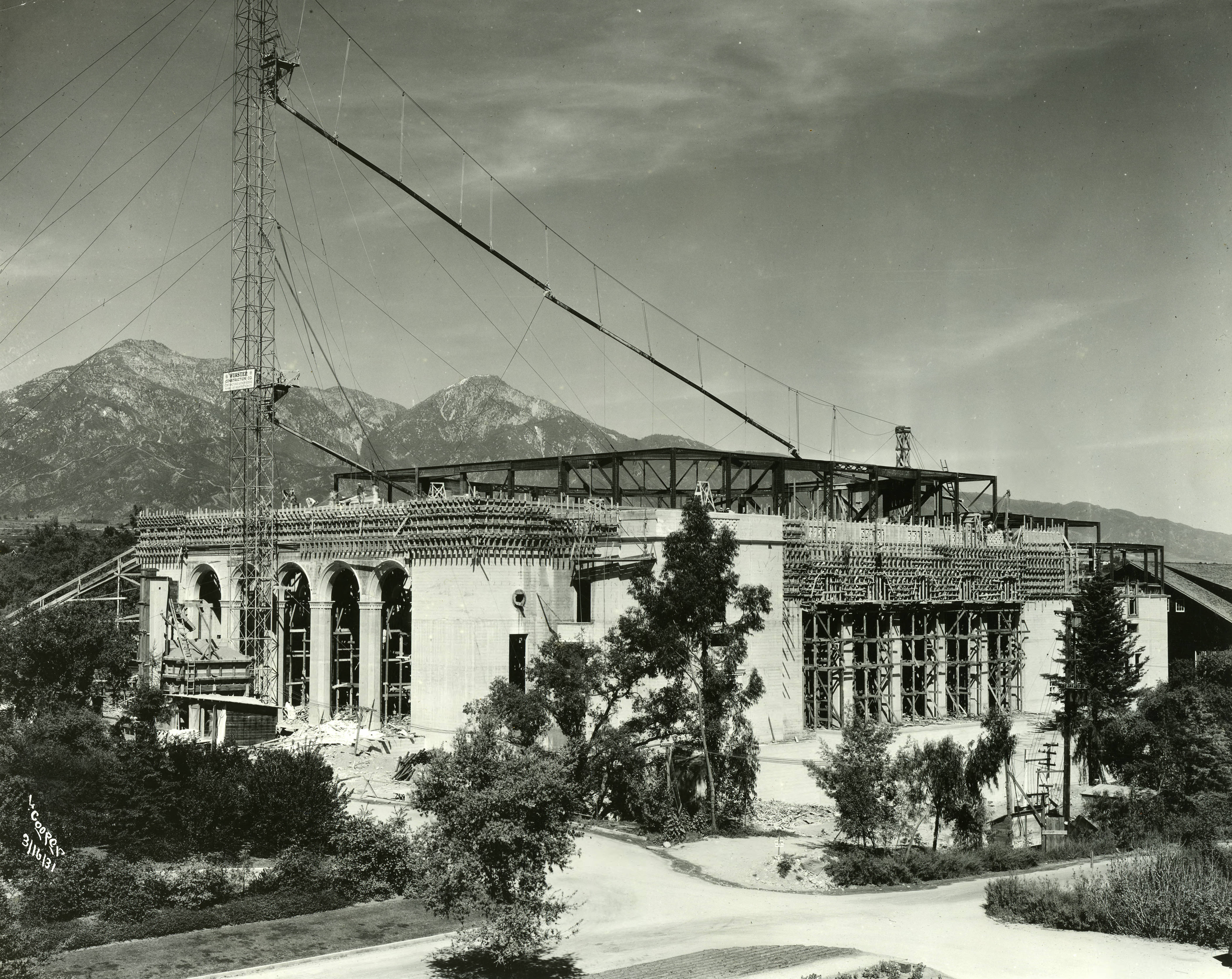
Big Bridges under construction in 1931

The auditorium was built as a joint project of the Claremont Colleges consortium. It was sponsored by Appleton and Amelia (nee Timken) Bridges, the parents of Mabel Shaw Bridges, a student in Pomona's class of 1908 who died of illness in her junior year, and H.H. Timken, president of the Timken Roller Bearing Company.

From its completion until the opening of the Dorothy Chandler Pavilion in 1964, it was arguably the premier destination of choice for prominent visitors to Southern California. It was also the largest collegiate auditorium on the West Coast, with a capacity nearly twice that of Pomona and equal to that of the city of Claremont. The Los Angeles Philharmonic frequently performed there.

The auditorium was renovated from 1975 to 1977 for seismic retrofitting and cosmetic repairs. In 2007, control was transferred from the consortium to Pomona individually. In the 2020s, the college sought to renovate the auditorium to address shortcomings such as its lack of air conditioning ahead of its centennial.

Pomona's 2015 master plan classified Big Bridges as a "building notable for establishing the distinctive context" of the college, and describes it as a symbol of the college's regional civic engagement. A 2015 environmental impact report from the college identified it as eligible for listing on the National Register of Historic Places, although as of 2020 the college has not yet applied for it to be listed. John Neiuber, writing for the Claremont Courier in 2017, expressed surprise it is not listed.

In 2026, a $1 million restoration of the ceiling mural and other elements of the theater was completed using a grant from the Timken Foundation.

== Architecture ==
Big Bridges is the primary visual anchor point for the east side of Marston Quadrangle, the center of Pomona's campus. It was constructed in a Renaissance Revival style modeled after northern Italy, and incorporates Art Deco elements. It has large porticos on its front and sides with arched columns, and a large formally adorned foyer inside the main entrance. The building's frieze features the names of five eminent composers; it was the target of a famous 1975 prank in which the one for Frédéric Chopin was replaced with one honoring Frank Zappa.

The auditorium has a capacity of 2,494 people, including a 500-seat cantilevered balcony. There are no supporting columns, allowing all seats to have unobstructed views of the 62-by-36-foot (19 m × 11 m) proscenium.

The basement has a historical exhibit.

=== Ceiling ===
A mural by Italian-American artist John B. Smeraldi covers the 22,000-square-foot (2,000 m^{2}) parabolic domed ceiling of the auditorium. It depicts a variety of constellations in silver and gold leaf against a pale blue background.

== Usage ==
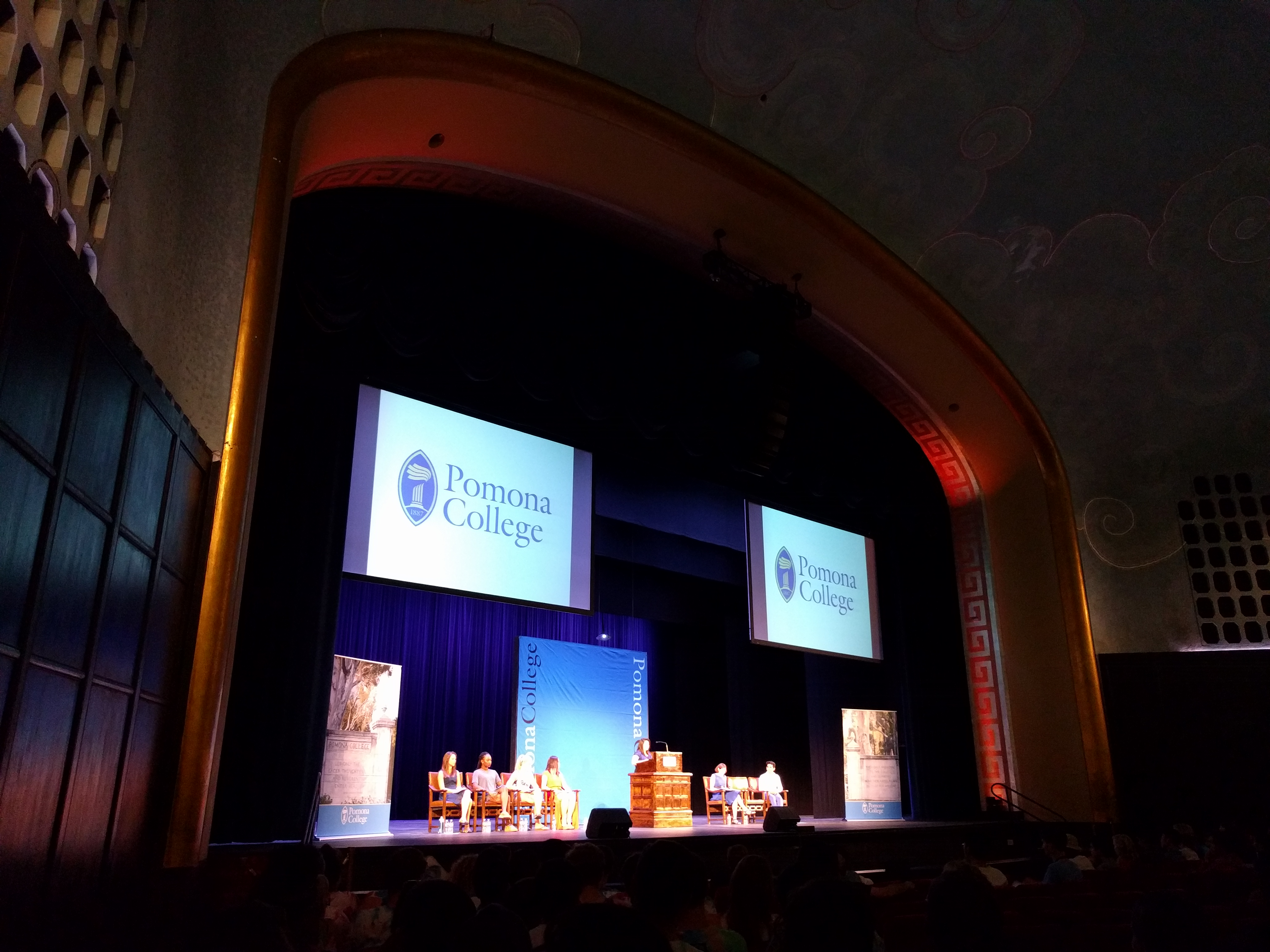
An orientation session for the Pomona class of 2020 in Big Bridges

Big Bridges hosts a variety of events and performances for the college, including orientation sessions, concerts, and guest speaker lectures. The college also rents the auditorium to outside groups for roughly 20-25 events per year. A number of films and television shows have used the auditorium as a set.
