= San Diego Trust and Savings Bank Building =

Historic building in San Diego, California, U.S.

- U.S. National Register of Historic Places
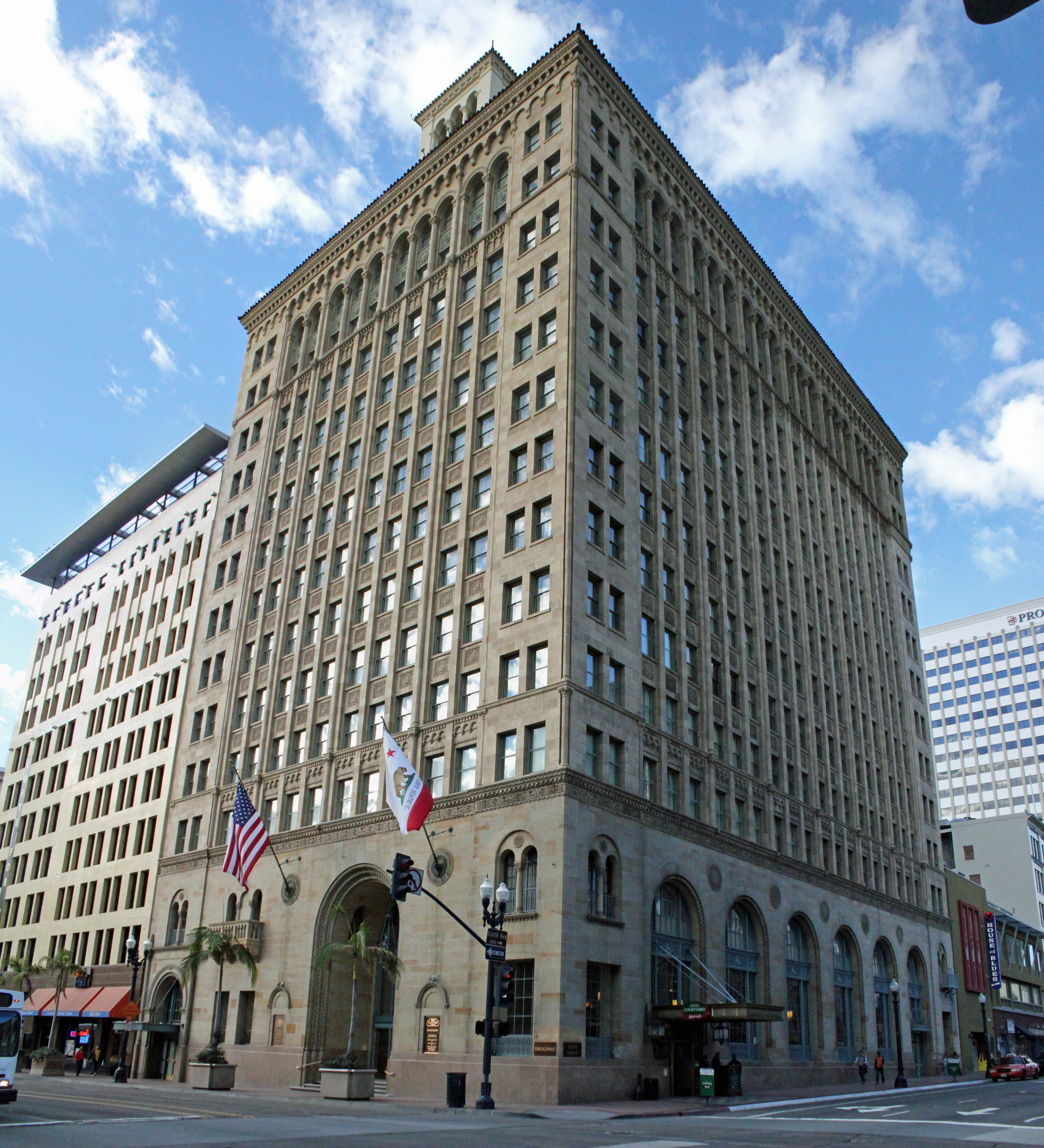
- The building's exterior in 2011

- Location within San Diego Location within California Location within the United States
- Location: San Diego, California, U.S.
- Coordinates: 32.7160°N 117.1595°W
- Built: 1928
- Architect: William Templeton Johnson
- NRHP reference No.: 99001565

The San Diego Trust and Savings Bank Building is an historic building in San Diego, in the U.S. state of California. It was listed on the National Register of Historic Places in 1999.

In 1926, architect William Templeton Johnson was commissioned to design the building, and construction began in 1927. The building opened to the public on April 14, 1928. The bank vacated the site on March 18, 1994, and in 1999 the building reopened as a Courtyard by Marriott hotel.

== See also ==
- National Register of Historic Places listings in San Diego County, California
