= Jean Walton =

American academic administrator

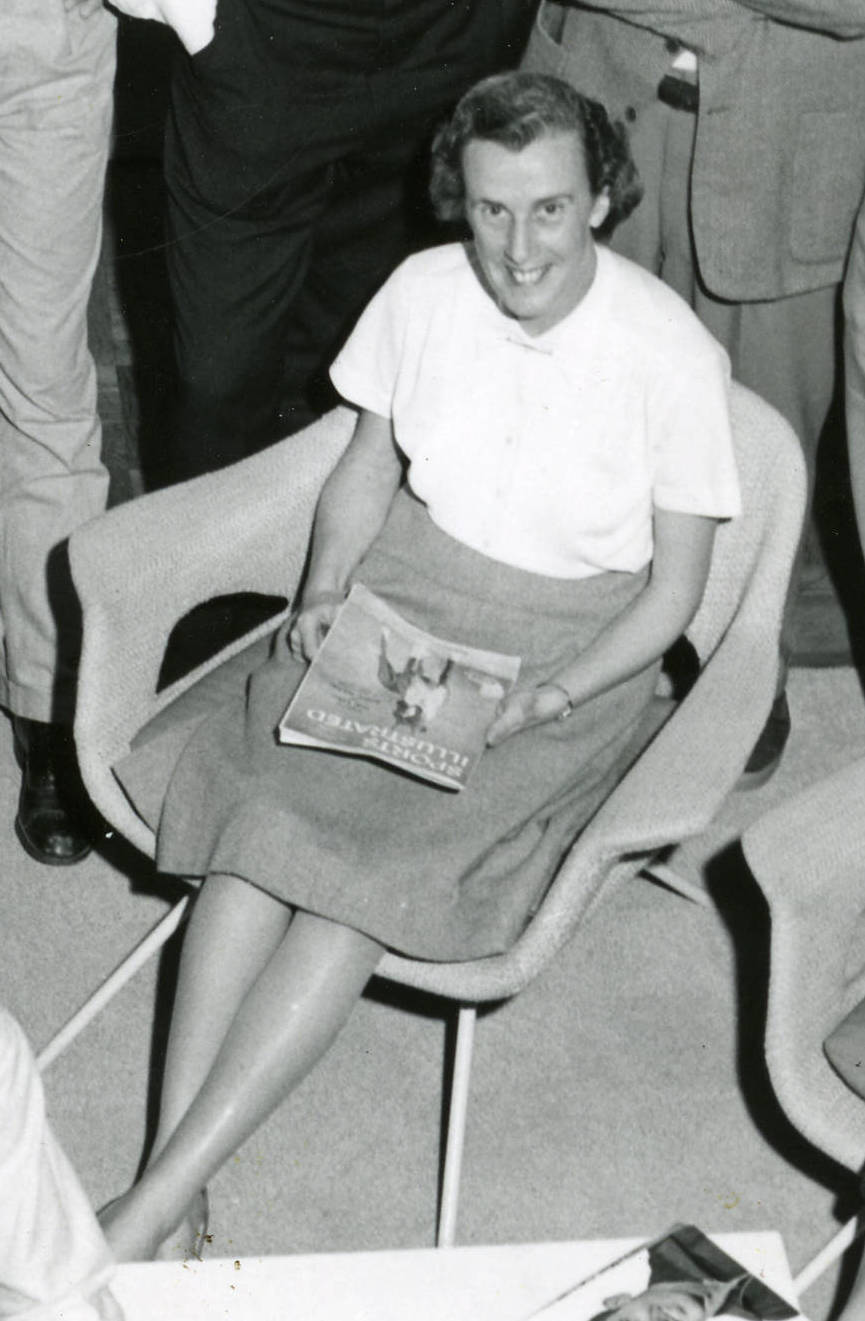
Walton in Pomona College's Walker Lounge c. 1957

Jean Brosius Walton (March 6, 1914 – July 5, 2006) was an American academic administrator and women's studies scholar. She spent the bulk of her career at Pomona College in Claremont, California.

Born to a Pennsylvania Quaker family, Walton grew up at George School and studied mathematics at Swarthmore College, Brown University and the University of Pennsylvania. She joined Pomona College in 1949 as the Dean of Women, and was promoted to dean of students in 1969 and vice president for student affairs in 1976, three years before her formal retirement. During her tenure, she advocated for women's education, engaged with student protests against the Vietnam War, oversaw reform of residential life policies to eliminate parietal rules, and co-founded the Claremont Colleges' Intercollegiate Women's Studies Program. She earned widespread recognition for her work and was praised by colleagues for her independent and dignified personality.

== Early life ==
Jean Brosius Walton was born on March 6, 1914, the fourth of five daughters, in Middletown Township, Bucks County, Pennsylvania. She grew up on the campus of George School, where her father George was the principal. Her mother Emily (née Ingram) was a homemaker. For high school, she attended George School and enjoyed mathematics classes in which she was often the only female student. She then enrolled at Swarthmore College, where she majored in math. She was socially active and played several sports but found dating difficult. After graduating in 1935 with highest honors, she taught high school math at Moorestown Friends School in New Jersey for three years. She then earned a master's degree in mathematics from Brown University in 1940, following the completion of her thesis on the Riemann–Stieltjes integral.

In 1945, she enrolled at the University of Pennsylvania to pursue a Ph.D. Her relationship with her advisor, German number theorist Hans Rademacher, was at first difficult because she did not fit his idea of a typical mathematician. However, she ultimately won his confidence after completing a difficult assignment that required her to translate French and German papers in an unfamiliar field, topology. She submitted her dissertation, "Theta series in the Gaussian field", on March 12, 1948, and after a successful defense received her doctorate in mathematics that June. It was published by the Duke Mathematical Journal in September 1949. She would later describe the experience as "isolating but confidence-boosting."

== Career ==
College education stimulates the individual student, man or woman, to continued growth. The woman should be encouraged to explore, identify, and develop fully her intellectual interests and abilities, and to seek ways which fit the circumstances of her life to use these abilities fully.

— Jean Walton, 1963

Walton began her career teaching math as an instructor at Swarthmore in 1940, serving as an assistant to the dean and then the acting dean of women in 1945. She also taught math at the University of Pennsylvania beginning in 1947.

Walton was hired by Pomona College, the founding member of the Claremont Colleges consortium, in 1949 as the dean of women on the recommendation of Swarthmore president John W. Mason. In her early years, she sought to expand her role beyond its disciplinary aspects and to help women navigate the marriage vs. career conflict by providing them with a broad liberal arts education. Over time, she grew concerned by the sexism she witnessed and the low expectations for female students.

In addition to her administrative duties, Walton taught calculus. However, she became increasingly disconnected from mathematics, which she felt was "too remote from life", and quit teaching after ten years. Together with classics professor Harry J. Carroll, Walton helped found an early iteration of Pomona's study abroad program. During the 1955–1956 academic year, she taught at Japan Women's University in Tokyo as a Fulbright Lecturer and filled a student services role similar to her own at Pomona. During the 1962–1963 academic year, she did a consultancy with the Danforth Foundation.

Walton was the president of the California Association of Women Administrators and Counselors from 1957 to 1959, and was chair of the college section of the National Association of Women Deans, Administrators and Counselors from 1963 to 1965.

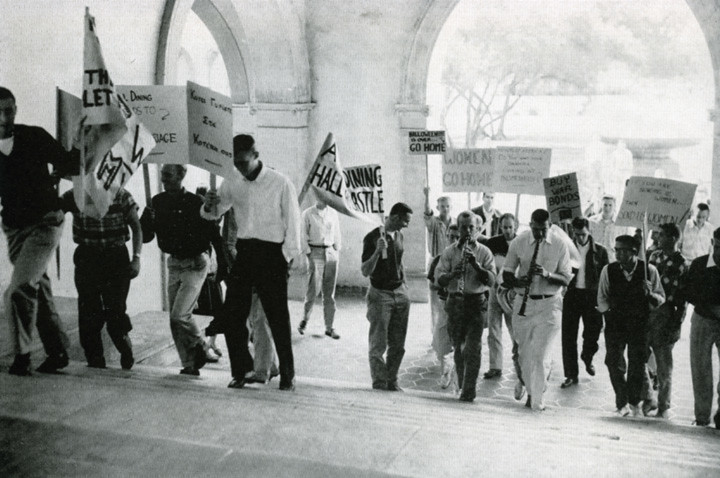
Men protest the opening of Frary Dining Hall to women, an early step in the gender desegregation of Pomona's residential life, in 1957

In the 1960s, Walton was a key figure in Pomona's handling of the countercultural revolution and student protests against the Vietnam War. During the 1967–1968 academic year, she chaired a student-faculty commission that worked on the college's demonstration policy. Walton also played an instrumental role in the liberalization of Pomona's residential life policies and the elimination of parietal rules that had restricted student freedom and segregated housing by gender. This put her on the forward edge of a nationwide trend toward the elimination of such rules; a colleague later recalled that she "changed with the times to an amazing degree".

In 1969, Walton became dean of students. During the fall 1971 semester, she travelled around the U.S. on sabbatical studying the American women's movement. The experience was transformative and inspired her to pursue feminist initiatives at Pomona. When she returned to campus for the spring semester, she chaired the college's Commission on the Education of Women, which recommended increasing the number of women on Pomona's faculty and changing the college's curriculum to better cater to female students. Walton was involved in ending the Pomona weigh-in, an annual practice in which the college's football team would forcibly weigh and measure the proportions of incoming first-year women during orientation. She assisted sponsors who objected to the tradition in 1972, and threatened to report the team for theft when she spotted them attempting to use college-owned scales the next year.

In 1976, Walton was promoted to vice president for student affairs. She co-founded the Claremont Colleges' Intercollegiate Women's Studies Program and was its first coordinator from 1978 to 1983. Historian Gerda Lerner, invited for a two-week residency in February 1978, encouraged her to make the program a joint venture between the colleges. Scripps College president John H. Chandler volunteered the college to take the lead role in the initiative, resolving funding disputes.

== Personal life ==
Walton was a devout Quaker. She lived in Claremont at 562 Baughman Ave. Her hobbies included gardening, mountain hiking, traveling, birding, and opera. A baseball fan, she supported the Dodgers.

=== Later years ===
Walton formally retired in 1979, although she remained active in the women's studies programs at the Claremont Colleges. In her elderly years, she moved to Mt. San Antonio Gardens in Claremont and regularly attended lectures and performances at the Claremont Colleges. She served on the city's Committee on Aging and in other civic roles. She died on July 5, 2006, at age 92.

== Recognition and legacy ==
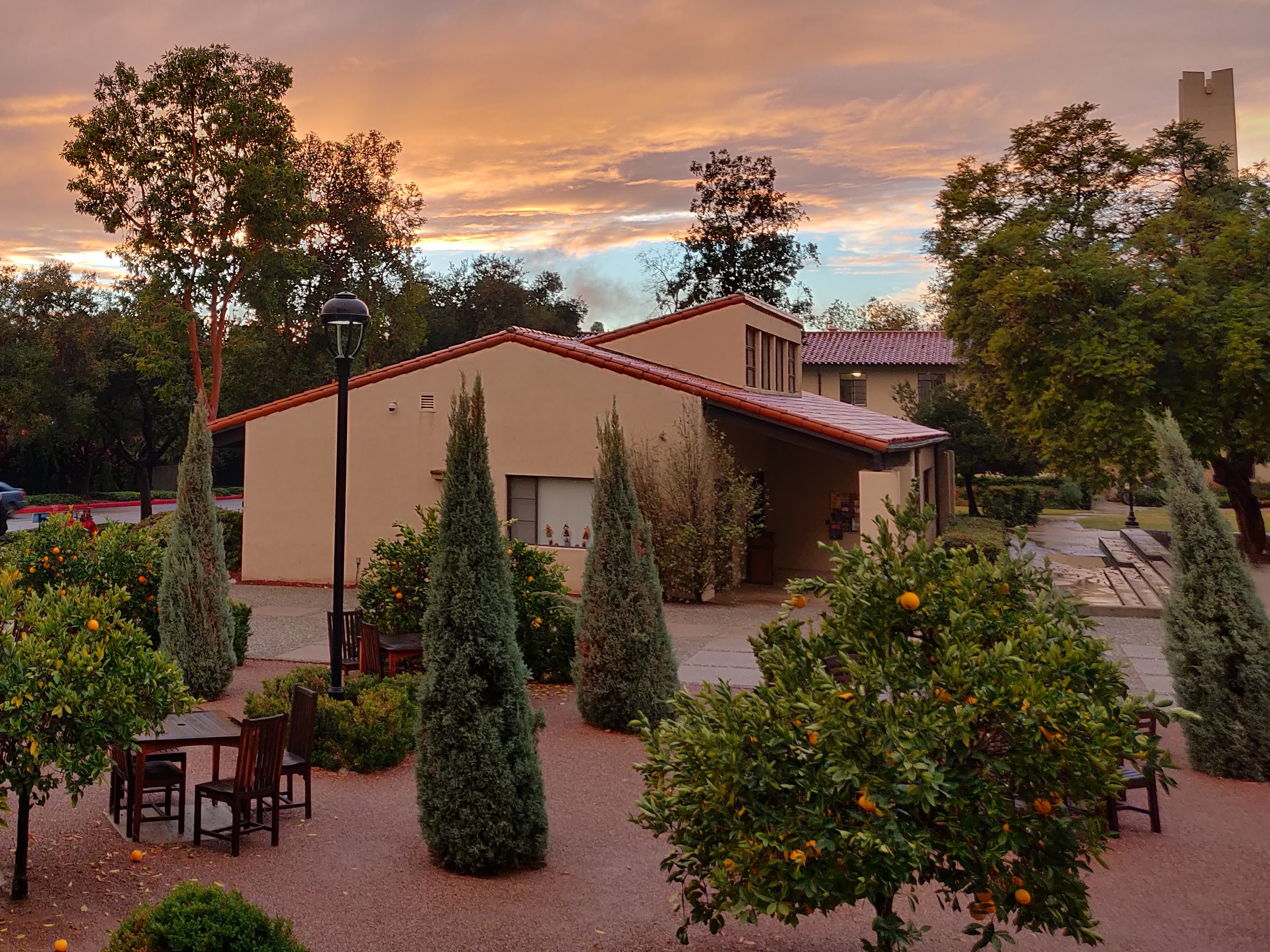
Walton Commons

Walton was awarded the National Association of Student Personnel Administrators' top honor, the Scott Goodnight Award, in 1974. The next year, she won Pomona's Wig Distinguished Professor Award, the college's highest faculty honor, in recognition of her teaching and her contributions to an interdisciplinary course on changing sex roles.

When she retired, her former students established the Jean B. Walton Scholarship Fund in her honor. A residential building at Pomona, Walton Commons, was named after her in 1981, and in 1994 the college awarded her an honorary doctor of science degree.

In remarks after her death, Pomona president David Alexander described her as "fiercely independent, sturdy and courageous" and credited her as "among the most important contributors" to the college's success. An obituary in the Claremont Courier noted that she "evokes the word 'dignity' from almost all who knew her."
