= Andrew Jaffe =

American journalist

Andrew Jaffe (August 2, 1938 – February 26, 2010) was an American journalist and executive of Adweek. Jaffe joined Adweek in 1986 and presided over the company as it acquired the Clio Awards for its parent corporation BPI Communications. He left BPI in 2003, creating a consulting firm, Compass Consulting, and authoring a book, Casting for Big Ideas.

Jaffe attended Phillips Exeter Academy. He then enrolled at Pomona College, where he was sent by The Student Life to cover the sit-in movement in Nashville, Tennessee. After serving in the Army, Jaffe graduated from the school of journalism at Columbia University. He first worked for the Associated Press, moved to Atlanta, where he worked for Newsweek in domestic bureaus and as a foreign correspondent to Africa in Kenya. He later became the business editor of the Los Angeles Herald-Examiner. He began his career with Adweek as an editor in Atlanta in 1986.

Jaffe was married to Eileen Ast and had two sons.
