= William Templeton Johnson =

American architect

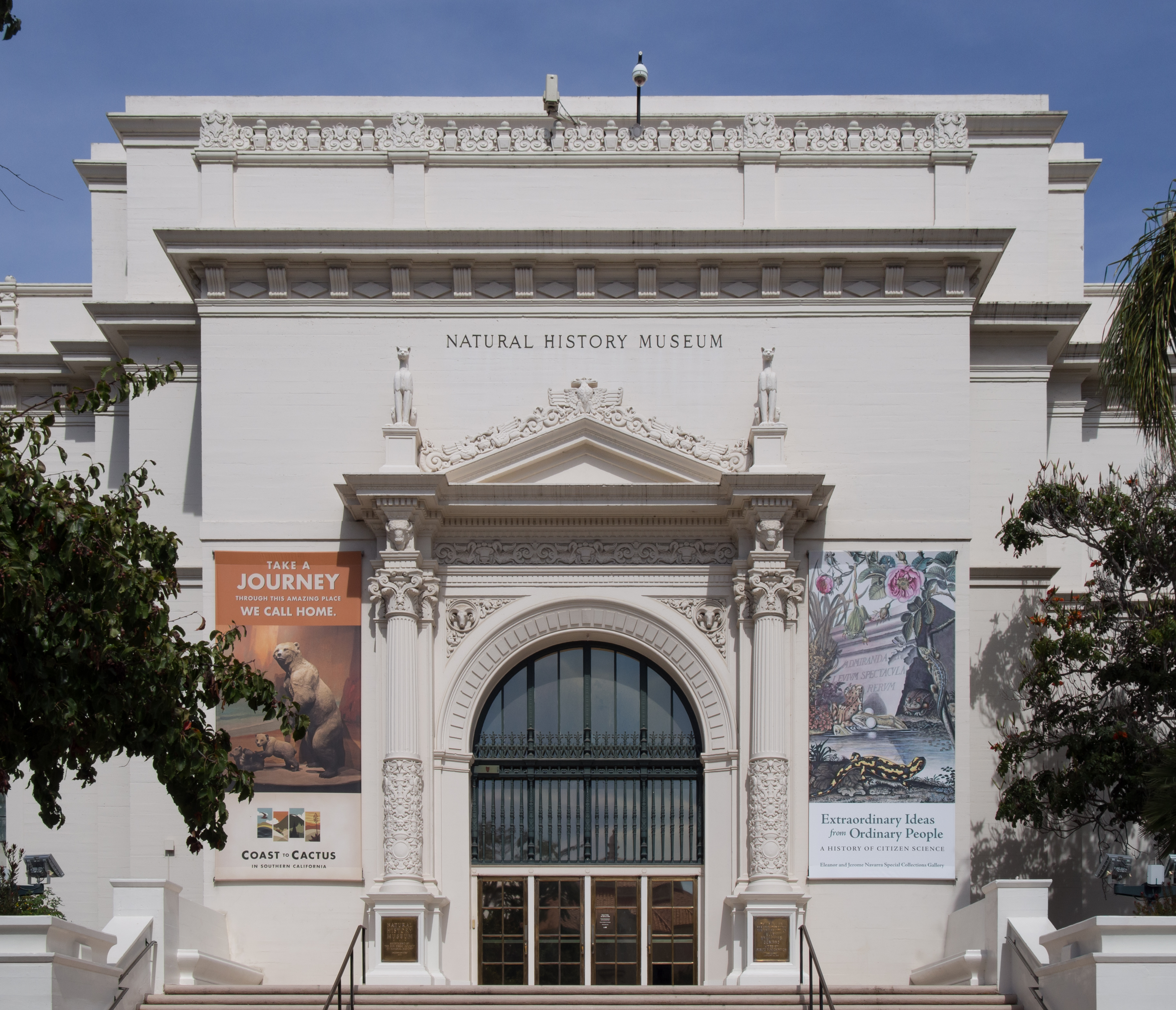
- San Diego Natural History Museum, designed by Johnson, in Balboa Park
- Born: 1877; Staten Island, New York, USA
- Died: 1957 (aged 79–80)
- Citizenship: American
- Occupation: Architect
- Awards: Fellow of the American Institute of Architects (1939)
- Buildings: San Diego Museum of Art; La Valencia Hotel; San Diego Trust and Savings Bank Building; San Diego Natural History Museum; San Diego County Administration Center
- Projects: Buildings for the Ibero-American Exposition of 1929
- Design: Spanish Revival architecture

William Templeton Johnson (31 August 1877 – 14 October 1957) was a notable San Diego architect. He was a fellow to the American Institute of Architects (AIA) in 1939.

== Biography ==
Born in Staten Island, New York, Johnson studied at the École des Beaux-Arts in Paris, and moved to San Diego with his wife in 1912. The following year, he received his certificate to practice architecture California, and he immediately started his own architectural firm. He started by designing the plan building of the Francis Parker School, and participated to the 1915 Panama–California Exposition. In 1917, he was appointed Vice-President of the San Diego Architectural Association.

== Work ==
Johnson is known for his Spanish Revival buildings, all in San Diego unless otherwise noted.

=== Buildings ===
- La Jolla Public Library, now the Athenaeum Music & Arts Library, 1921
- Fine Arts Gallery in Balboa Park in 1932, now the San Diego Museum of Art, 1926
- La Valencia Hotel, La Jolla, 1926
- The San Diego Trust & Savings Bank at Sixth and Broadway, 1928
- The Serra Museum in Presidio Park, 1929
- 3 buildings (one extant) for the Ibero-American Exposition of 1929, Seville, Spain
- Design of the office building of the Fox Theater, 1929
- The Mabel Shaw Bridges Music Auditorium, Pomona College, Claremont, California
- Base for the statue El Cid Campeador
- The San Diego Natural History Museum, also in Balboa Park, 1932
- The San Diego County Administration Center (with other architects)

=== Residences ===
- 1236 Alameda Boulevard, Italian Renaissance style, built 1912, designated Historic Resource in 2002, Johnson briefly lived in this house.
- 1111 G Avenue, Craftsman Bungalow style, built 1914, designated Historic Resource in 2006.
- 1117 G Avenue, Transitional Ranch style, built 1915, designated Historic Resource in 2004.
- 1000 Glorietta Boulevard, Pueblo Revival style, built 1916, designated Historic Resource in 2007.

== Awards ==
- 1933: Certificate of Honor delivered to the Claremont Colleges for the Bridges Auditorium designed by Johnson

== Private life ==
Johnson married Clara Delafield Sturges in 1905. They had four children (Winthrop, Arthur, Alan, Katherine) and divorced.
