= Donald Bentley =

American mathematician

Donald Lyon Bentley is an American statistician and mathematician. A doctoral student of biostatistician Rupert Griel Miller at the Stanford University School of Humanities and Sciences, Bentley graduated with a Doctor of Philosophy in Applied Mathematics and Statistics in 1962. He then taught at the Mathematics and Statistics Department of Pomona College in Claremont, California from 1964 to 2001, becoming Lingurn H. Burkhead Professor of Mathematics, an endowed chair, before retiring to become a professor emeritus. He was also president of the Southern California Chapter of the American Statistical Association from 1987 to 1988, and was named a Fellow of the American Statistical Association in 1990.

Bentley is known locally for his role in creating Pomona College's tradition of revering the number 47. It began in the summer of 1964, when two students, Laurie Mets and Bruce Elgin, conducted a research project seeking to find out whether the number occurs more often in nature than would be expected by chance. They documented various 47 sightings, and Bentley produced a false mathematical proof that 47 was equal to all other integers. The number became a meme among the class, which spread once the academic year began and snowballed over time. Many Pomona alumni have since deliberately inserted 47 references into their work. In the early 2010s, the college's clock tower would chime on the 47th minute of the hour.
