= The Student Life =

Student newspaper of the Claremont Colleges

- Type: Weekly newspaper, during the academic year
- Format: Broadsheet
- School: Claremont Colleges
- Editor-in-chief: Claire Welch
- Staff writers: ≈ 130
- Founded: November 1889; 136 years ago
- Language: English
- Headquarters: Room 101, Walker Hall, Pomona College, Claremont, California
- Circulation: 1000 print copies, plus digital readership
- OCLC number: 27659818
- Website: tsl.news

The Student Life (abbreviated TSL) is a student newspaper covering the Claremont Colleges (7Cs, or 5Cs when referring only to the undergraduate colleges), a consortium of liberal arts colleges in Claremont, California. It is published weekly each Friday during the academic year, typically spans roughly ten pages per issue, and is primarily funded by the student governments of the colleges.

The paper is the oldest college newspaper in Southern California, having been published since 1889. It is also the largest and most widely distributed campus newspaper at the 5Cs, with a significant readership among students, staff, faculty, alumni, and members of the Claremont community. It maintains a staff of around 120 students, including writers, columnists, photographers, videographers, designers, copy specialists, business associates, and editors.

TSL operates out of Room 101 in Walker Hall on the northern portion of Pomona College's campus.

== Operations ==
TSL is primarily funded by the student governments of the colleges. (Note: These are the Associated Students of Pomona College, the Associated Students of Claremont McKenna College, Scripps Associated Students, the Associated Students of Harvey Mudd College, and the Pitzer Student Senate)

It is published weekly each Friday during the academic year.

== History ==
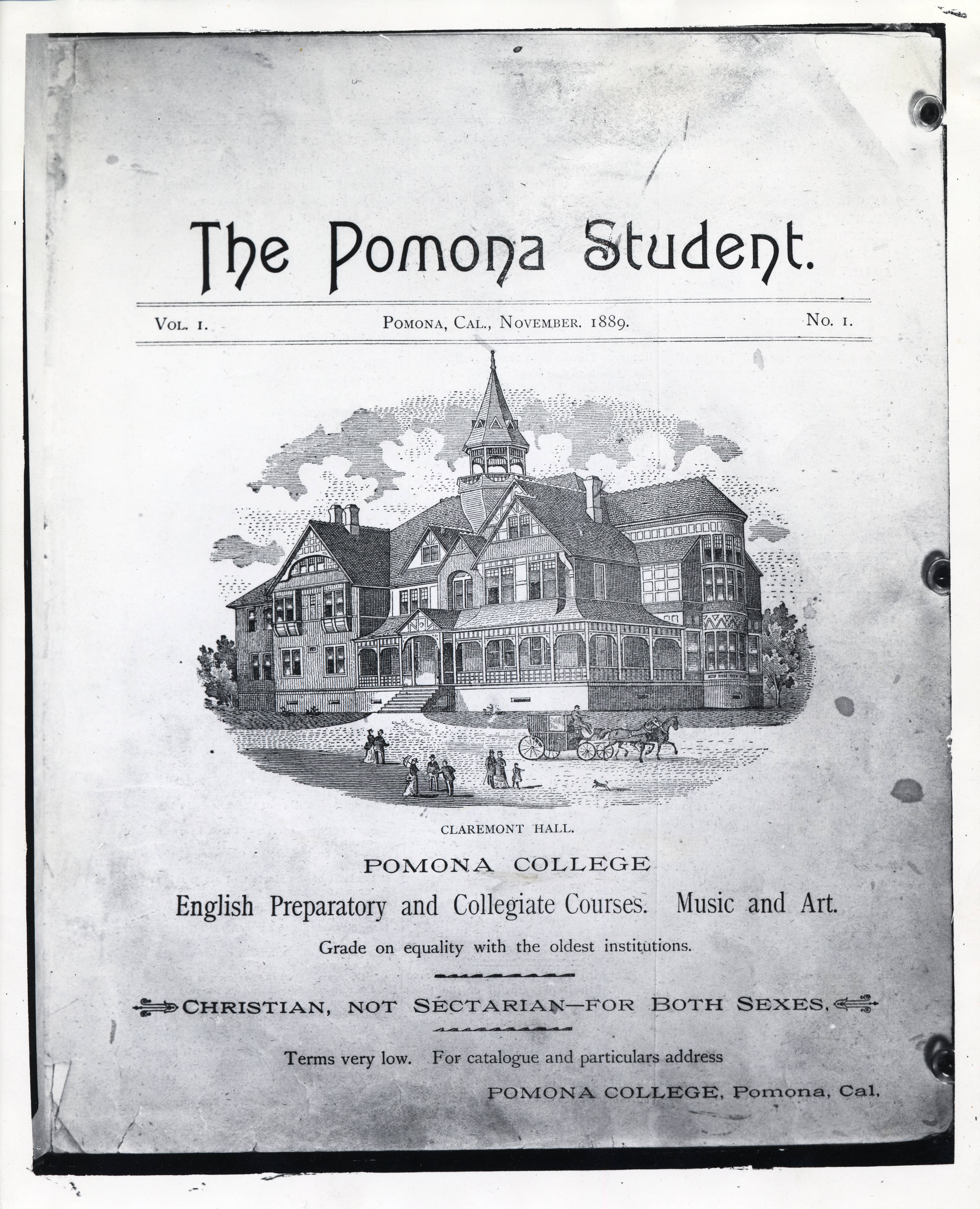
Cover of TSL's first edition, 1889

TSL (historically abbreviated as "the SL") was founded in November 1889 (two years after the founding of Pomona College) as a four-page monthly called the Pomona Student. Initially an informal bulletin for campus happenings, it adopted its current name and moved to weekly publication in 1893.

By 1926, it was publishing five issues a week; many were filled largely with advertisements. In 1939, this was reduced to two issues per week to save money, and in 1944, these issues became only two pages long to conserve paper during World War II. After the war, it gradually expanded, and in 1956, it returned to weekly publication.

TSL editors, c. 1950

In 1965, it merged with other Claremont Colleges newspapers to form the Claremont Collegian, which covered all 5Cs, but it was revived two years later as a Pomona-only publication (except for a two-page weekly insert focusing on newly established Pitzer College).

Like other publications, TSL developed an increasingly robust digital presence in the 2000s and 2010s.

TSL used to be closely linked with the Associated Students of Pomona College, but moved to become increasingly independent. In 2008, it began shifting its focus to cover the entire consortium, and its coverage and staff makeup today reflect all 5Cs.

== Sections ==
Front page of The Student Life (April 6, 2012)

TSL has four primary sections that appear in each issue: News, Arts & Culture, Opinions, and Sports.

The News section appears at the front of the paper, and covers a range of campus politics, issues, and current events, and often includes investigative pieces. The content specifically focuses on the 5Cs and life on campus, and does not usually include coverage of national or international stories.

The Arts & Culture section includes feature stories on campus life, as well as a number of weekly or bi-weekly columns. TSL is well known for its sex column, which appears regularly and is credited to an anonymous author or pseudonym.

The Opinions section includes opinions pieces by columnists and guest columnists, as well as editorials. The content in this section reflects a broad range of the ideological views found at the 5Cs.

The Sports section covers the Pomona-Pitzer Sagehens and Claremont-Mudd-Scripps Stags and Athenas, as well as national sports.

Once a year, typically on the Friday nearest to April Fools' Day, TSL releases a mock edition of the newspaper with funny articles and satirical news stories.

== Notable coverage ==
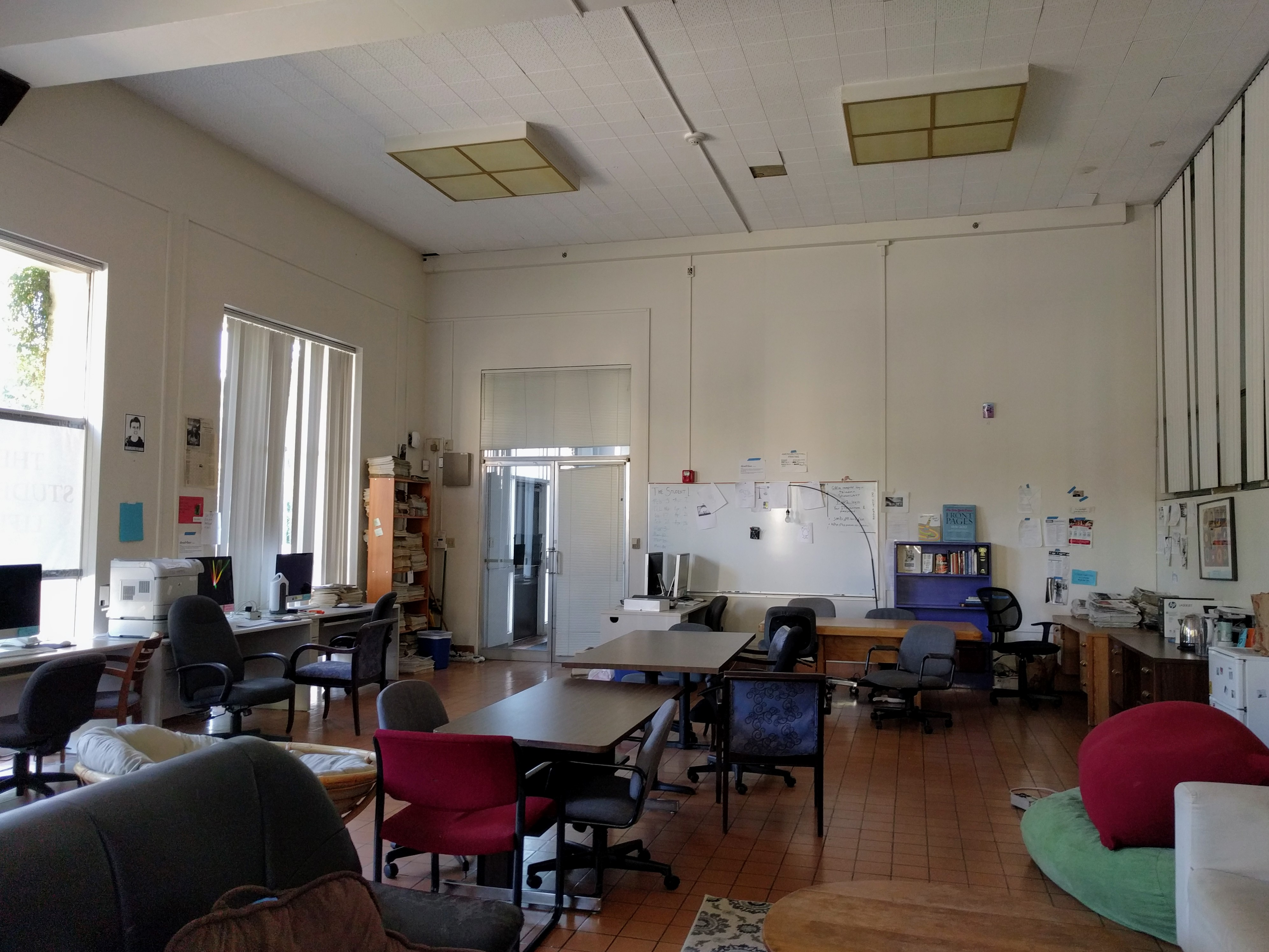
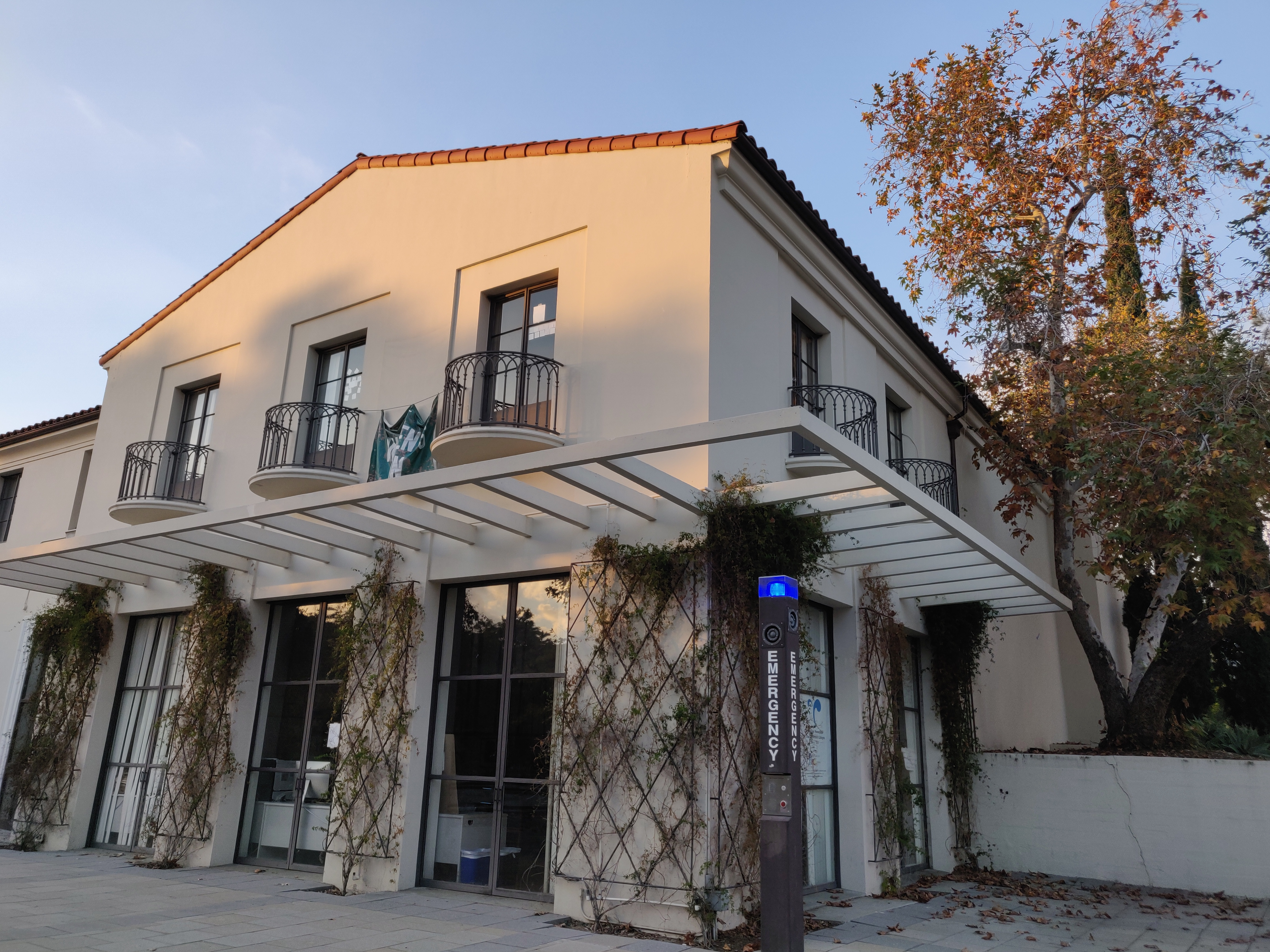
TSL's office is located inside Walker Hall at Pomona College.

As the Claremont Colleges' paper of record, TSL has provided much of the original reporting for major events at the 5Cs throughout their history. In recent years, TSL's reporting has been frequently referenced by national media outlets reporting on campus controversies.

In November 2015, TSL's reporting on racial tensions at Claremont McKenna College that led to the resignation of a dean of students was widely cited by national media outlets covering the episode.

In March 2017, TSL leaked an internal Harvey Mudd College report which criticized the severe workload at the school. The leak triggered widespread protests which led the college to cancel classes for two days.

In April 2017, TSL's coverage of a blockade of a speech by conservative pundit Heather Mac Donald (as well as the sanctions subsequently imposed on some blockaders) was widely cited by national media outlets.

TSL's coverage has sometimes drawn criticism from conservative national media outlets, many of whom are fed stories by the conservative 5C Claremont Independent publication. Following the 2015 racial tensions protest, Fox News criticized TSL for providing a space specifically for students of color in an issue.

== Staff ==
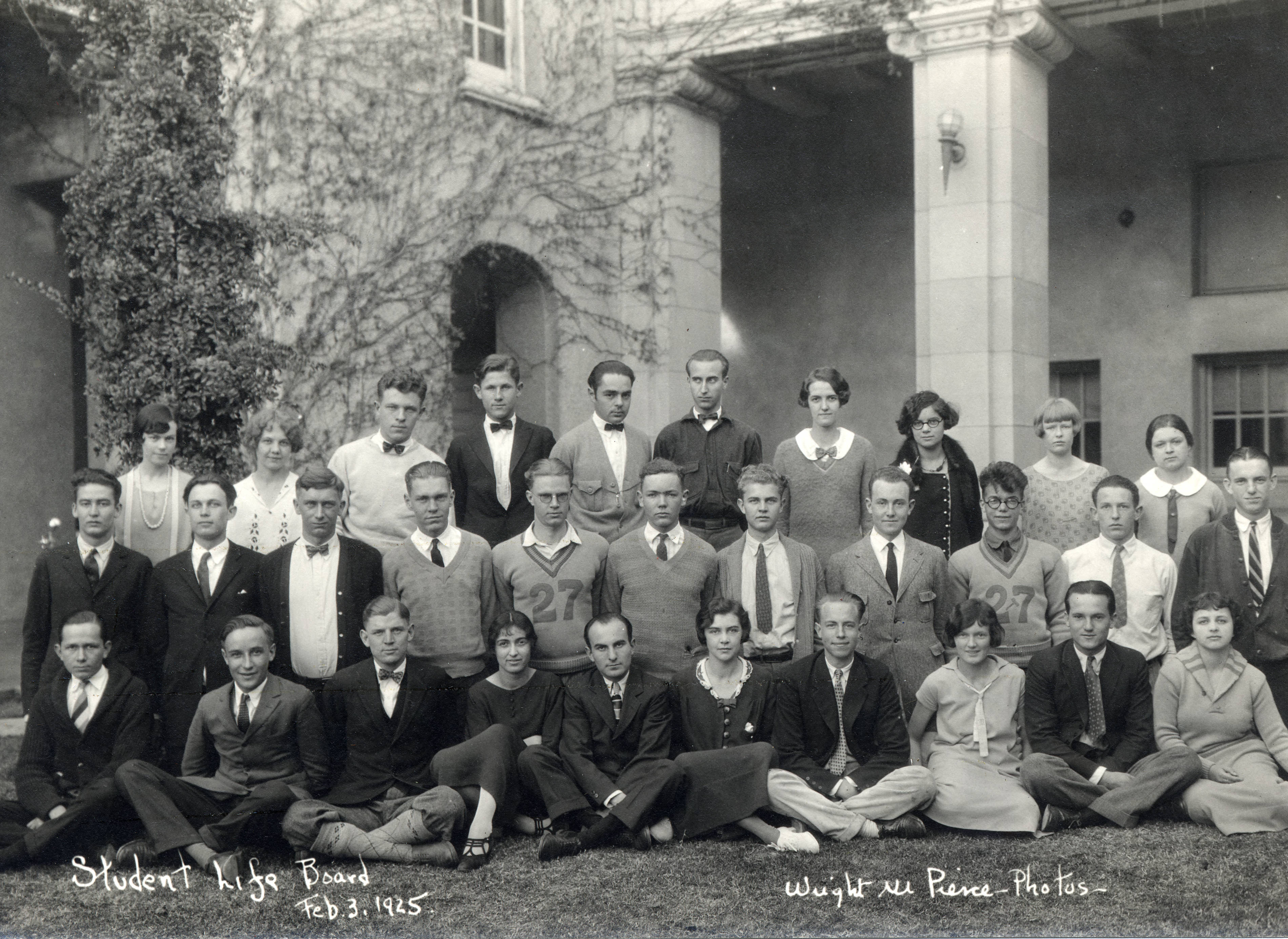
TSL staff photo, February 23, 1925

TSL maintains a staff of around 120 students, including writers, columnists, photographers, videographers, designers, copy specialists, business associates, and editors. The Claremont Colleges do not have a journalism major, so staff members come from a variety of academic backgrounds.

The newspaper's editorial board is composed of an editor-in-chief and two managing editors. All three positions have a semester term. The editor-in-chief is selected by a committee generally composed of senior staff members.

Many TSL alumni have gone on to have prominent journalism careers. Andrew Jaffe from Pomona's class of 1960, who traveled to Nashville to cover the sit-in movement for TSL, later became an executive at Adweek and oversaw the Clio Awards. Mary Schmich from Pomona's class of 1975, who co-edited the paper, won the 2012 Pulitzer Prize for commentary for her columns in the Chicago Tribune. Former New York Times executive editor and Pulitzer winner Bill Keller from Pomona's class of 1970 edited the Collegian when he was in college and maintains close ties with TSL's current staff.

=== Editors-in-chief ===
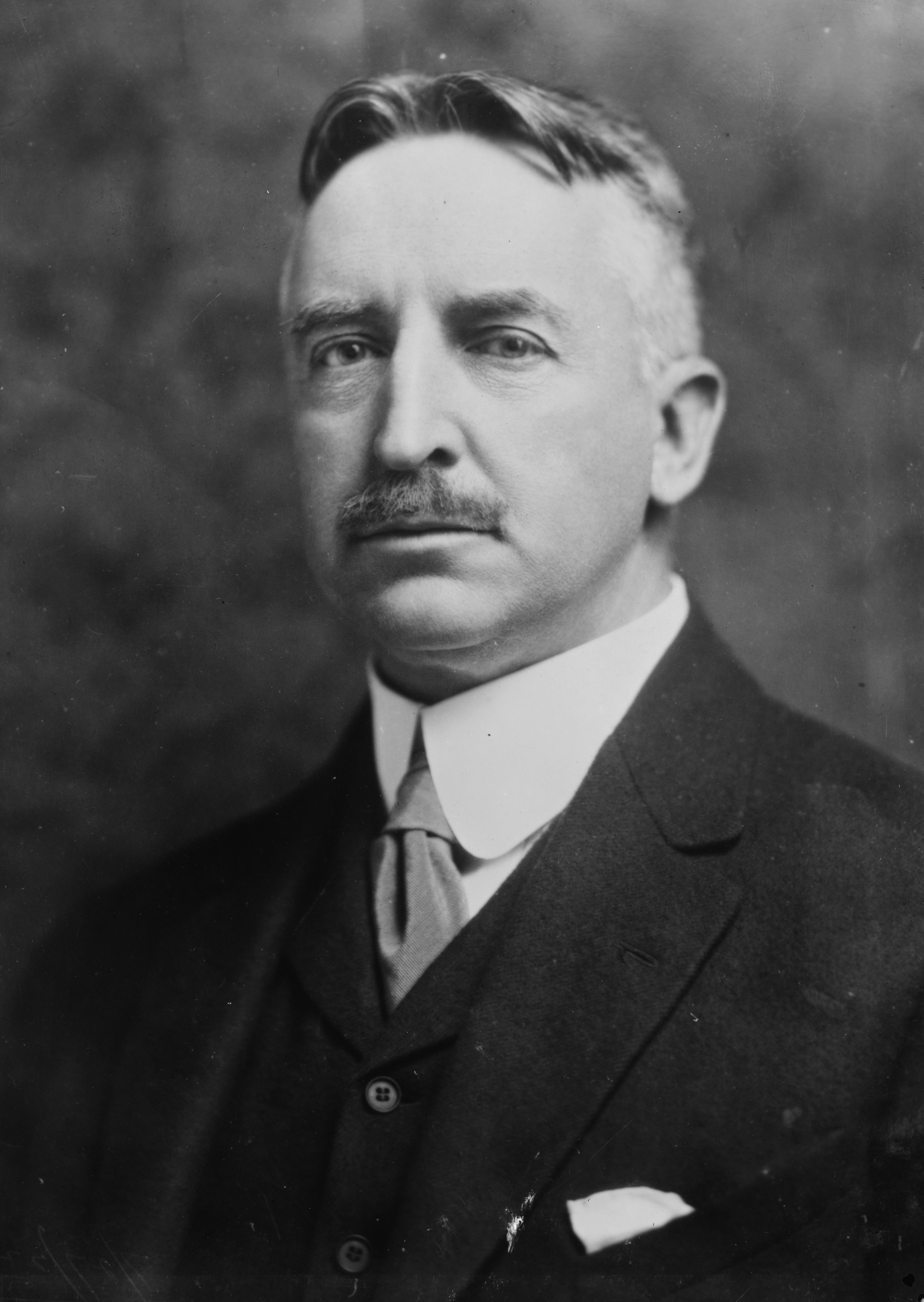
TSL's founding editor, anthropologist David P. Barrows, went on to become a two-star general in the California National Guard and president of the University of California system.

Name	Term	College	Grad. year	Ref.
Claire Welch	Fall 2026	Scripps	2027	
Adam Akins	Spring 2026	Pitzer	2027	
Jada Shavers	Fall 2025	Scripps	2025	
June Hsu	Spring 2025	Pomona	2025	
Ansley Washburn	Fall 2024	Scripps	2026	
Ben Lauren	Spring 2024	Pitzer	2025	
Maxine Davey	Fall 2023	Pomona	2025	
Hannah Weaver	Spring 2023	Scripps	2024	
Jenna McMurtry	Fall 2022	Pomona	2024	
Jasper Davidoff	Spring 2022	Pomona	2023	
Kayla Alcorcha	Fall 2021	Scripps	2024	
Yasmin Elqutami	Spring 2021	Pomona	2022	
Maria Heeter	Fall 2020	Scripps	2022	
Hank Snowdon	Spring 2020	CMC	2021	
Meghan Bobrowsky	Fall 2019	Scripps	2021	
Kellen Browning	Spring 2019	Pomona	2020	
Ariel So	Fall 2018	Scripps	2020	
Meghan Joyce	Spring 2018	Scripps	2020	
Liam Brooks	Fall 2017	Pitzer	2018	
Lauren Ison	Spring 2017	Pomona	2018	
Alexa Strabuk	Fall 2016	Pitzer	2017	
Carlos Ballesteros	Spring 2016	CMC	2016	
Kevin Tidmarsh	Fall 2015	Pomona	2016	
Julia Thomas	Spring 2015	Scripps	2017	
Caroline Bowman	Fall 2014	CMC	2014	
Zoë Jameson	Spring 2014	Pomona	2015	
Paul Jay Fukushima	1970-1971	Pomona	1972	
John McCumber	1967?	Pomona	?	
Charles Jefferson	Fall 1966	Pomona	?	
Alan Hayes	1965?	Pomona	?	
Rob Cooley	Spring 1965	Pomona	?	
Alice Higman	Fall 1964	Pomona	?	
Lew Phelps	Fall 1963–Spring 1964	Pomona	?	
Ann Walker	Fall 1956–Spring 1957	Pomona	1957	
Thomas E. Small	Spring 1953	Pomona	1954	
Elizabeth Letts	Fall 1952	Pomona	1954	
John Phillips	1941?	Pomona	?	
Mark Ginsbourg	Fall 1932–Spring 1933	Pomona	1933	
William E. Gould	Fall 1926–Spring 1927	Pomona	?	
Kenneth Williamson	1926?	Pomona	?	
Margaret Martin	1924?	Pomona	?	
Hoyt R. Curtiss	1922?	Pomona	?	
Paul Davis	1913?	Pomona	?	
Philip S. Bird	1909?	Pomona	1909	
Robert Clogher Owens	Fall 1898–Spring 1899	Pomona	?	
David Prescott Barrows	Spring 1894	Pomona	1894	
Guenevere Metkiff	Fall 1893	Pomona	1894	
Carl Gould	1890?	Pomona	?	
David Prescott Barrows	1889	Pomona	1894	

== See also ==
- KSPC – Claremont Colleges' radio station
- Claremont Colleges § Clubs and organizations – other 7C news organizations
- Claremont Courier – City of Claremont's newspaper of record
- List of Pomona College people § Journalism and non-fiction writing (includes many TSL alums)
- List of college and university student newspapers in the United States
