= David Prescott Barrows =

American anthropologist (1873–1954)

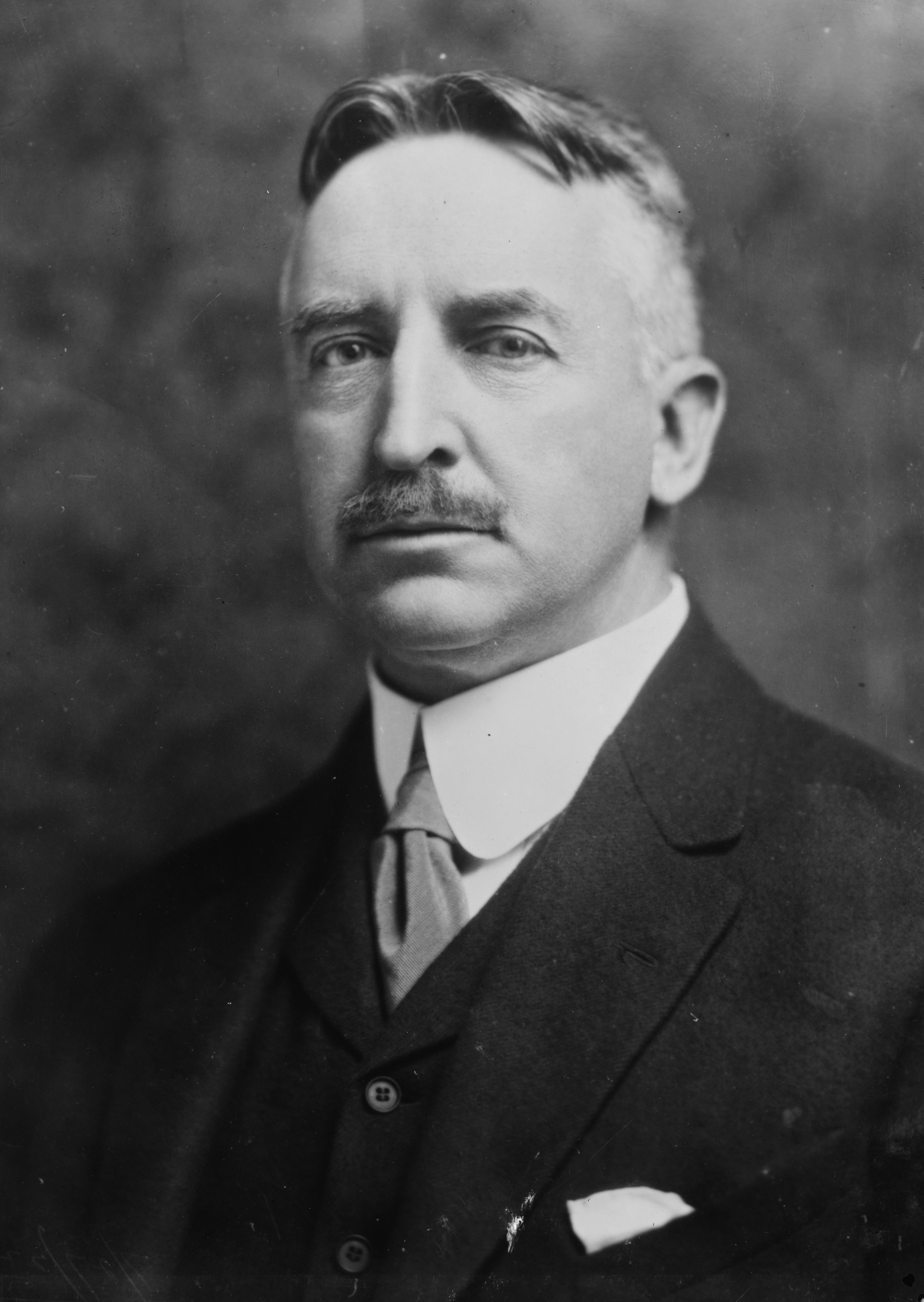
- Born: June 27, 1873; Chicago, Illinois, US
- Died: September 5, 1954 (aged 81) Walnut Creek, California, US
- Allegiance: United States
- Branch: United States Army
- Service years: 1917–1937
- Rank: Major General
- Commands: 91st Infantry Division; 40th Infantry Division
- Conflicts: World War I Russian Civil War
- Education: Pomona College (B.A.); University of California, Berkeley (M.A.); University of Chicago (PhD)
- Other work: Academic

David Prescott Barrows (June 27, 1873 – September 5, 1954) was an American anthropologist, explorer, military officer, and educator. Born in Chicago in 1874, his family moved to California. He showed a keen interest in the life and customs of Native Americans, and was said to have "spent almost every summer during the period 1890–1899 in research work among the tribes of southern California and in the Colorado Desert." He later became President of the University of California. He traveled extensively, publishing descriptions of his findings in countries such as Morocco and the Philippines.

== Early years ==
Barrows graduated from Pomona College in 1894, where he served as the founding editor of its newspaper, The Student Life. He then obtained a Master's degree in political science from the University of California, Berkeley, in 1895. During the summers between 1890 and 1899 he pursued research with the tribes of southern California and the Colorado Desert, and wrote a thesis on "the Ethno-Botany of the Coahuilla Indians of Southern California" which earned a doctoral degree in anthropology from the University of Chicago in 1897.

== Career ==
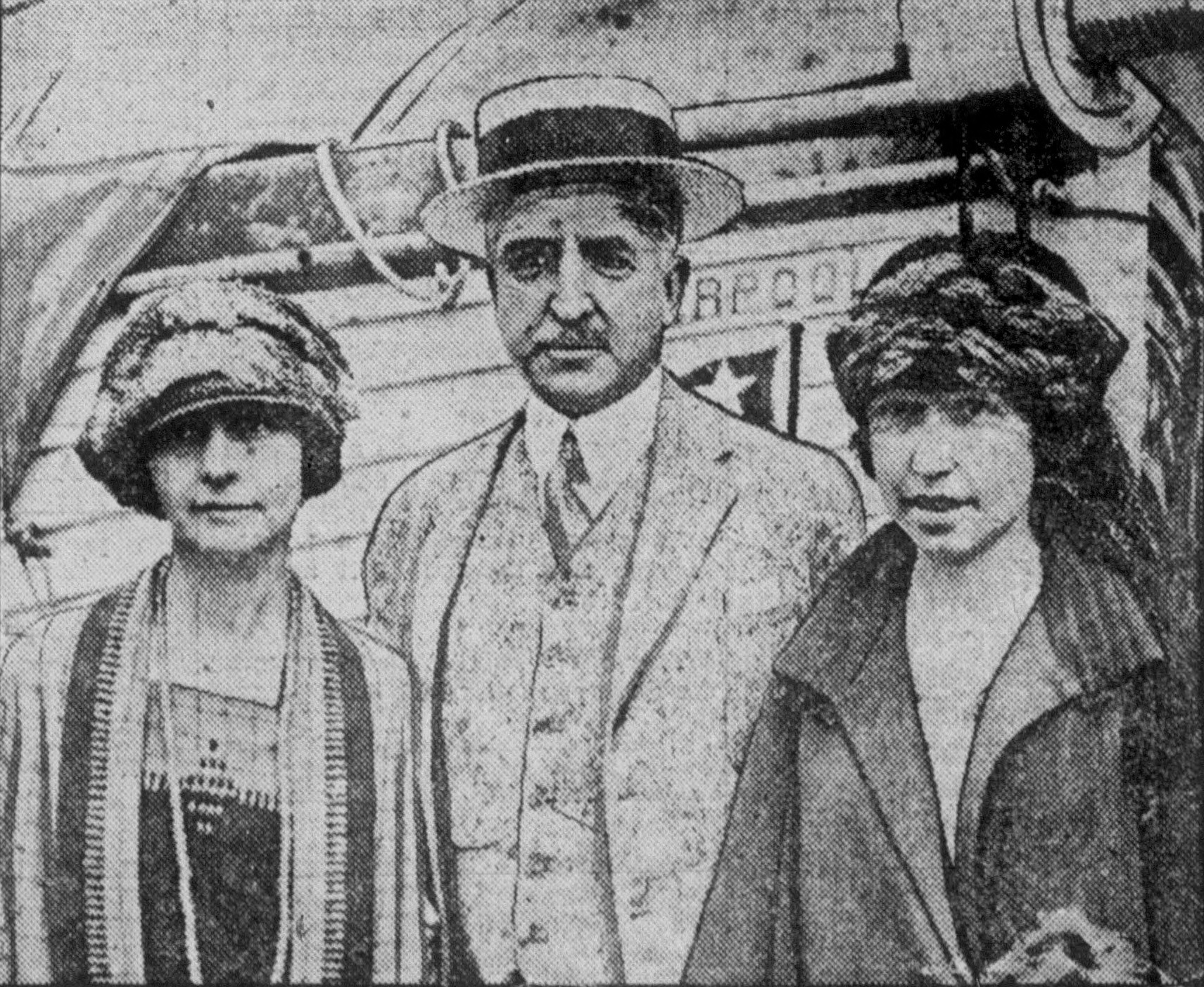
Barrows on his way to Africa c. 1923

Barrows taught history in the state normal school in San Diego. In 1900, he was appointed superintendent of schools for Manila by William Howard Taft, president of the Philippine Commission. His career in the Philippines was eventful as he was designated Chief of the Bureau of Non-Christian Tribes of the Philippine Islands, and reconnoitered many unknown areas of the Philippines. In 1903, as general superintendent of education for the Islands, he was instrumental in the total reorganization of the educational system. After his return from Philippines, he worked for the University of California, holding the post of professor of education and, in 1910, dean of the graduate school. In 1911 he became professor of political science, and in 1913, was the dean of the faculties.

During the First World War Barrows served in various capacities: as a member of the American Commission for Relief in Belgium, as a major of cavalry unit serving in the Philippines, and as an intelligence officer in the Philippines and Siberia with the American Expeditionary Forces. He served in the defense establishments until 1919. Even after he returned to the University of California, he continued to serve with the National Guard of the United States until 1937, when he reached the rank of major general. During the 1934 Maritime Strike in San Francisco, Barrows led the assault against the striking maritime workers who were seeking to gain union recognition and union hiring halls. He also testified for the federal government in a September 1939 immigration trial in which the government sought to deport Longshore leader Harry Bridges.

From December 1919 to June 1923 Barrows was the elected president of the University of California. He traveled for one year to Africa, including visits to Timbuktu and Sudan. He returned from Africa in 1924 and held the post of chairman of the department of political science. He continued to teach till he retired in 1943. He wrote many syndicated articles for journals, newspapers, and The World in Review, participated in radio talks, and also wrote many books on his experiences in Philippines and Africa.

In his book Berbers And Blacks: Impressions Of Morocco, Timbuktu And The Western Sudan Barrows described his travel experiences in Algeria and Morocco. He described Marrakesh as Morocco's "strangest city", and wrote of it "The city lies some fifteen or twenty miles from the foot of the Atlas mountains, which here rise to their grandest proportions. The spectacle of the mountains is superb. Through the clear desert air the eye can follow the rugged contours of the range for great distances to the north and eastward. The winter snow mantle them with white, and the turquoise sky gives a setting for their grey rocks and gleaming caps that is of unrivaled beauty."

Barrows' post-retirement activity also included public service in various capacities, such as on the Board of Trustees of Mills College, the California State Commission on Rural Credit and Land Colonization, the East Bay Municipal Utility District, and the Board of Trustees of the California College in China Foundation. During the Second World War he was appointed as consultant to the Secretary of War and the Office of Strategic Services.

Barrows died at the age of 81 on September 5, 1954.

== Philosophy ==
Barrows' philosophy with regard to American imperialism has been described as a "humanitarian imperialism". On the one hand, he adopted a paternalistic attitude toward non-white peoples, consistent with the "White Man's Burden" paradigm popular at the time. However, he also held their perceived best interests at heart and sought to help them, setting him apart from the many American imperialists with exploitative goals, who he despised. Barrows held the Coahuilla and other Native Americans in particular high regard; Rupert Costo later said that he was "closer to our hearts than any white man before or since".

== Legacy ==
Barrows's papers can be found in the Bancroft Library at UC Berkeley; his daughter Ella Hagar further added to the collections.

He was the namesake of Barrows Hall on UC Berkeley's campus, which was built in 1964. On November 18, 2020, the university announced that his name would be removed from the building, publishing a press release that characterized him as a racist colonizer.

== Bibliography ==
- Barrows, David Prescott (2004). Berbers And Blacks: Impressions Of Morocco, Timbuktu And The Western Sudan. Kessinger Publishing. pp. 12–. ISBN 9781417917426.
- Barrows, David Prescott (1926). History of the Philippines. Library of Alexandria. ISBN 978-1-4655-1686-2.

Academic offices
Preceded by Benjamin Ide Wheeler	President of the University of California; 1919–1923	Succeeded by William Wallace Campbell
