= John B. Smeraldi =

Italian-American muralist and furniture and interior designer

- Born: Palermo, Sicily, Italy
- Died: May 14, 1947; Bayside, New York, U.S.
- Occupation(s): Muralist, furniture designer, interior designer
- Spouse: Francesca Smeraldi
- Children: 2 sons, 3 daughters
- Relatives: Maria Giacalone (né)Smeraldi (sister), Cosmo Giacalone (brother-in-law), Lucia Ventimiglia (né)Smeraldi (sister), Santo Ventimiglia (brother-in-law) Joseph Giacialone (nephew), Lauretta Giacalone (niece)

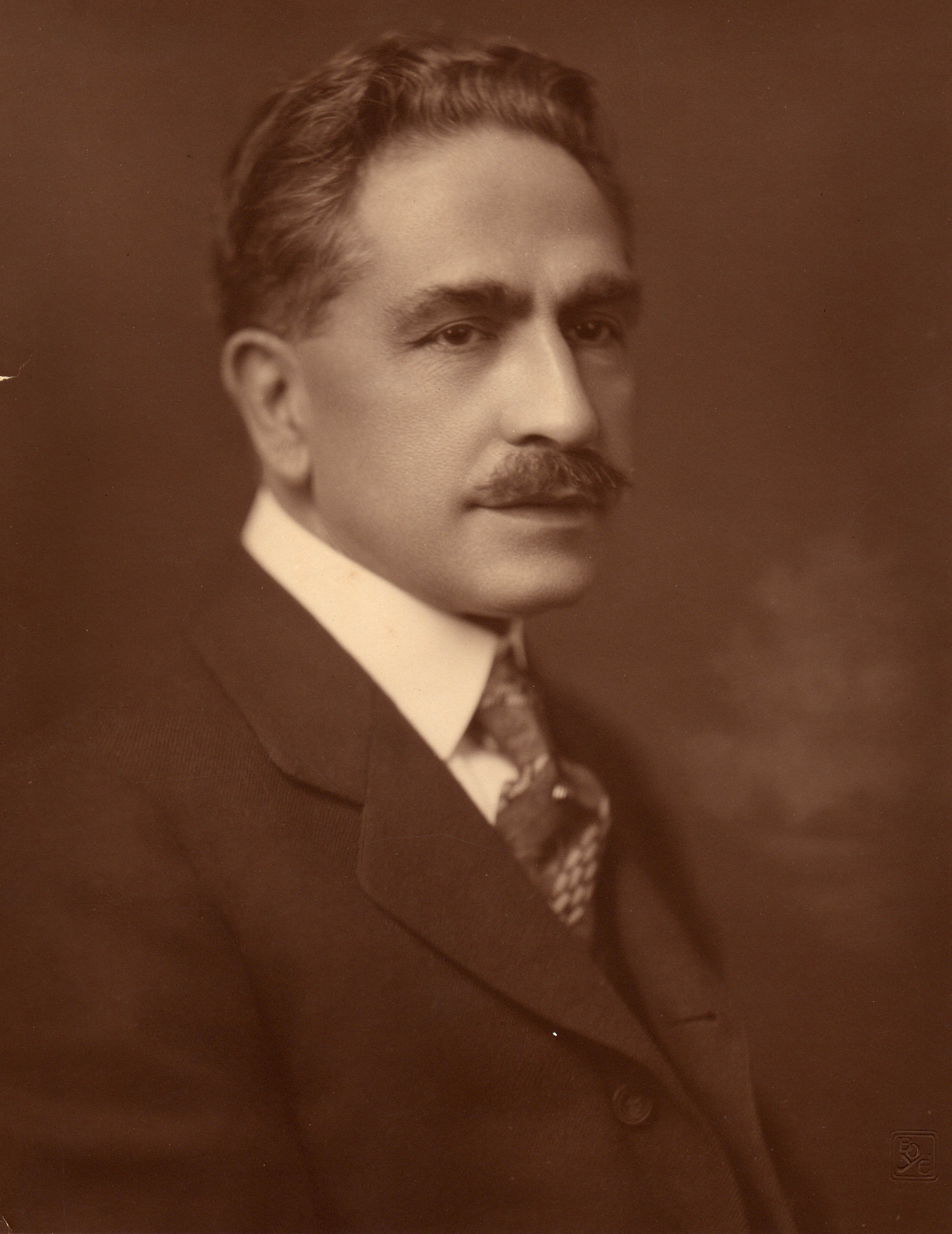

John B. Smeraldi (died May 14, 1947) was an Italian-born American muralist, and furniture and interior designer. He painted the ceilings of many buildings, including the ballroom inside the Biltmore Hotel in Los Angeles, California.

== Life ==
Smeraldi was born Giovanni Battista Smeraldi in Palermo in December 1859, Sicily, Italy. He emigrated to the United States in 1889.

Smeraldi began his career as a designer for Marcotte & Co. In 1921, he moved to Los Angeles to paint the ceiling of the ballroom inside the Biltmore Hotel. He also painted the ceiling inside the Pasadena Convention Center, and he worked on the Jonathan Club. Beyond California, his work extended to the New York Biltmore Hotel, the Atlanta Biltmore Hotel, The Breakers in Palm Beach, Florida, and Château Frontenac in Quebec City, Canada.

Smeraldi resided in Los Angeles. With his wife Maria, he had two sons and three daughters. He died on May 14, 1947, in Bayside, New York.
