= List of Pitzer College people =

Here follows a list of notable alumni and faculty of Pitzer College.

== Notable alumni ==
=== Arts and letters ===
==== Film and television ====
- Anne Archer 1969, actress
- Matthew Berkowitz, filmmaker
- Matthew Cooke 1996, documentary filmmaker
- Eric Douglas, actor and stand-up comedian, son of Kirk Douglas, brother of Michael Douglas
- Shatara Michelle Ford, director, writer and producer
- Dee Mosbacher, documentary filmmaker, gay rights activist, and psychiatrist

==== Writing ====
- Max Brooks 1994, author and lecturer, son of Mel Brooks and Anne Bancroft
- Dennis Cooper, novelist, poet, critic, and performance artist
- John Darnielle 1995, novelist and lead singer of The Mountain Goats
- Amy Gerstler 1978, poet and winner of the 1991 National Books Critics Circle Award for Bitter Angel
- Dana Levin 1987, poet
- Sandra Mitchell 1973, author, professor and philosopher of science
- Isabel Neal 2012, poet and winner of the Yale Series of Younger Poets Prize in 2025
- Susan Patron 1969, children's author and winner of the 2007 Newbery Medal for The Higher Power of Lucky
- Rob Magnuson Smith 1991, author

==== Journalism ====
- David Bloom 1985, anchor, NBC News

==== Music ====
- Tom Freund 1993, singer-songwriter and musician
- J.Lately 2009, rapper
- Jonah Matranga 1991, singer-songwriter and musician, former frontman for Far and Gratitude
- Matt Nathanson 1995, singer-songwriter and musician
- Michael Simpson 1986, Grammy Award-winning producer/composer; one half of the Dust Brothers

=== Government and law ===
- Michael Ceraso, political consultant and state director for the presidential campaigns of Pete Buttigieg and Bernie Sanders
- Kevin de León 2003, member of the Los Angeles City Council and former member of the California State Legislature
- Mablean Ephriam 1971, former prosecutor for the city of Los Angeles, television personality and actress
- Eli Erlick 2016, transgender activist, director of Trans Student Educational Resources
- Steven González 1985, chief justice of the Washington State Supreme Court
- Matthew Karatz 1994, deputy mayor of Los Angeles
- Debbie Mucarsel-Powell, member of the U.S. House of Representatives from Florida's 26th district
- Fabian Núñez, former speaker of the California State Assembly
- Debra Wong Yang 1981, former United States attorney for Central District of California; first female Asian-American U.S. attorney

=== Business ===
- Susan Feniger 1976, celebrity chef and restaurateur
- John Landgraf 1984, FX Network president
- Ashwin Navin 1998, CEO of Sambaa

=== Other ===
- Hunter Lovins, co-founder of Rocky Mountain Institute
- Setha Low 1969, anthropologist, director of the Public Space Research Group
- Charles Martinez, university administrator
- Sharon Monsky 1975, founder of the Scleroderma Research Foundation
- Nick Simmons 2011, reality television personality, son of Gene Simmons and Shannon Tweed
- Diana Vicezar 2023, Paraguayan entrepreneur

== Notable faculty ==
- Halford Fairchild, Psychology and Black Studies
- Judith Grabiner, Mathematics, history of mathematics and science; awarded the 2014 Beckenback Book Prize for A Historian Looks Back: The Calculus as Algebra and Selected Writings (MAA Spectrum, 2010); inaugural member of the 2012 Fellows of the American Mathematical Society
- David Moore, Psychology, director of the Claremont Infant Study Center, winner of the American Psychological Association's 2016 Maccoby Book Award for The Developing Genome: An Introduction to Behavioral Epigenetics (2015)
- Gregg Popovich, men's basketball coach 1979–1986, 1987–1988
- Dana Ward, emeritus professor of Political Studies, founder of the Anarchy Archives, executive director of the International Society of Political Psychology (1998–2004)
- Phil Zuckerman, Sociology and Secular Studies, expert in secularity, atheism, apostasy, and Scandinavian culture; author of several books including Living the Secular Life (2014); frequent contributor to the Huffington Post and sought-after commentator for discussions on secularism
