= Karatz =

Karatz is a surname. Notable people with the surname include:

- Bruce Karatz (born 1945), American businessman
- Matthew Karatz (born 1972), American politician
