= Paul Shepard =

American human ecologist

Paul Howe Shepard, Jr.
- Born: June 12, 1925; Kansas City, MO
- Died: July 27, 1996 (age 71); Salt Lake City, Utah
- Occupations: Author, Professor
- Spouse: Florence Bertagnolli Shepard
- Children: Jane Shepard, Margaret (Marnie) Elizabeth Shepard, Kenton Howe Shepard
- Writing career
- Subjects: Ecology, Domestication, Ecopsychology
- Notable works: The Tender Carnivore and the Sacred Game, Nature and Madness, Coming Home to the Pleistocene, Where we Belong, the Others.

Paul Howe Shepard, Jr. (June 12, 1925 – July 27, 1996) was an American environmentalist and author best known for introducing the "Pleistocene paradigm" to deep ecology. His works established a normative framework in terms of evolutionary theory and developmental psychology. He offered a critique of sedentism/civilization and advocates modeling human lifestyles on those of nomadic prehistoric humans. He explored the connections between domestication, language, and cognition.

== Early life and education ==
Shepard was born in Kansas City and earned his bachelor's degree from the University of Missouri. He went on to earn a doctorate from Yale, and his 1967 book Man in the Landscape: a Historic View of the Esthetics of Nature was based on his thesis. From 1973 until his retirement in 1994 he taught at Pitzer College and Claremont Graduate University.

== Career ==
Shepard taught biology at Knox College and established the school's Green Oaks Biological Field Station with George Ward.

== Legacy ==
Shepard's books have become landmark texts among ecologists and helped pave the way for the modern primitivist train of thought, the essential elements being that "civilization" itself runs counter to human nature - that human nature is a consciousness shaped by our evolution and our environment. We are, essentially, "beings of the Paleolithic".

Based on his early study of modern ethnographic literature examining contemporary nature-based peoples, Shepard created a developmental model for understanding the role of sustained contact with nature in healthy human psychological development, positing that humans, having spent 99% of their social history in hunting and gathering environments, are therefore evolutionarily dependent on nature for proper emotional and psychological growth and development. Drawing from ideas of neoteny, Shepard postulated that many humans in post-agricultural society are often not fully mature, but are trapped in infantilism or an adolescent state.

He died of lung cancer on July 21, 1996, in Salt Lake City.

Some of his most influential books are The Tender Carnivore and the Sacred Game, Nature and Madness, Coming Home to the Pleistocene, Where we Belong, and the Others.

== Selected works ==
- Man in the Landscape: An Historic View of the Esthetics of Nature. New York: Knopf, 1967.
- The Subversive Science: Essays Toward an Ecology of Man. Boston: Houghton Mifflin, 1969.
- Environ/mental: Essays on the Planet as Home. Boston: Houghton Mifflin, 1971.
- The Tender Carnivore and the Sacred Game. New York: Scribners, 1973.
- Thinking Animals: Animals and the Development of Human Intelligence. New York: The Viking Press, 1978.
- The Sacred Paw: The Bear in Nature, Myth, and Literature New York: The Viking Press, 1985. Coauthored with Barry Sanders
- Nature and Madness. San Francisco: Sierra Club Books, 1992. Natura e follia, a cura di Dominique Lestel, traduzione di Francesca Frulla, Edizioni degli animali, Milano 2020 (Italian translation).
- The Only World We've Got: A Paul Shepard Reader. San Francisco: Sierra Club Books, 1996.
- The Others: How Animals Made Us Human. Washington, D. C.: Island Press/Shearwater Books, 1996.
- Traces of an Omnivore. Washington, D. C.: Island Press/Shearwater Books, 1996.
- Coming Home to the Pleistocene Florence R. Shepard (Ed.) Washington D.C.: Island Press/Shearwater Books, 1998.
- Encounters With Nature: Essays by Paul Shepard. Florence R. Shepard (Ed.) Washington, D.C: Island Press/Shearwater Books, 1999.
