= Political unitarism =

Concepts that enforce fully unified system of government

Political unitarism designates various theories, concepts or policies that advocate or enforce a fully unified and centralized system of government, with ultimate goal in creating a unitary state. In practice, unitarism is often manifested as a political doctrine or movement within complex political entities (confederations, federations, and other political unions), advocating for the highest degree of political integration and unification, beyond mere administrative centralization.

One of the main goals of political unitarists (proponents of unitarism) is to abolish or substantially suppress all forms of regional self-government and autonomy, by transferring powers of confederated states, federal units, autonomous regions or cantons directly to the central government. Unitarization and regionalization are often confused with centralization and decentralization, respectively.

== History ==
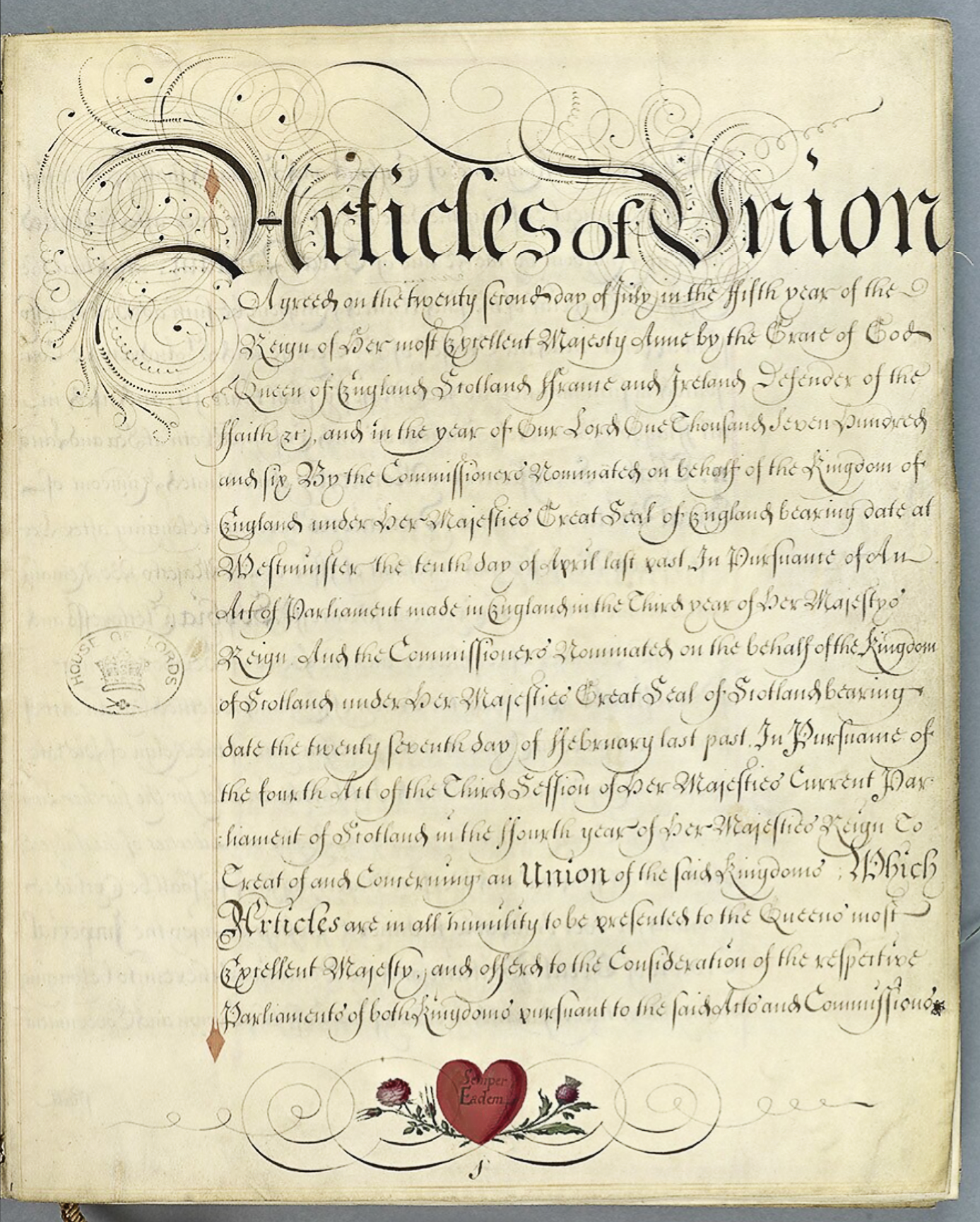
Original of the Acts of Union that created the Kingdom of Great Britain as a unitary state

Historically, complex processes of political unitarization were often accompanied by political struggle between proponents of unitarism and radical centralization, and their opponents, advocating decentralization and regionalism. In political history, that kind of political struggle was very frequent, even from ancient times. One of the most famous examples of local resistance to political unitarism in classical times was the internal conflict between ancient Athens and other federated city-states within the Delian League.

In modern history, one of the most notable examples of political unitarization was the creation of Kingdom of Great Britain by the Acts of Union in 1701, and subsequently the creation of United Kingdom of Great Britain and Ireland by the Acts of Union in 1800.

One of practical goals of political unitarism is to create a singular legislature, with exclusive legislative powers over the entire territory of a state. Through the process of political unitarization, local regions within an emerging unitary state are deprived of any form of contract with the centralized government. Thus, the remaining regional powers, if any have been left at all, are not protected by being entrenched in the constitution of the unitary state; they can be reduced even more, or completely abolished, by the acts of the central government.

== See also ==
- Unitary state
- Centralization
- European Union
- Localism (politics)

== Literature ==
- Gerring, John; Thacker, Strom C. (2004). "Political Institutions and Corruption: The Role of Unitarism and Parliamentarism" (PDF). British Journal of Political Science. 34 (2): 295–330. doi:10.1017/s0007123404000067. S2CID 2277141. Archived from the original (PDF) on 2018-11-23.
- E. H. Kossmann (1971), "The Crisis of the Dutch State 1780–1813: Nationalism, Federalism, Unitarism", in: Britain and the Netherlands, Dordrecht: Springer, pp. 156–175.
- Paterson, Lindsay (1998). A Diverse Assembly: The Debate on a Scottish Parliament. Edinburgh University Press. ISBN 9780748610075.
- Danilo Vuković (2001), "Democratic consolidation and social consensus – cleavage between unitarists and separatists in Bosnia and Herzegovina", in: South-East Europe Review for Labour and Social Affairs, 1/2001, pp. 95-111.
