= Laura Skandera Trombley =

American academic administrator

16th President of Southwestern University
- Incumbent
- Assumed office July 1, 2020
- Preceded by: Edward Burger; Dale T. Knobel (interim)

10th President of University of Bridgeport
- In office July 1, 2018 – April 2, 2020
- Preceded by: Neil Albert Salonen
- Succeeded by: Stephen Healey (interim)

8th President of the Huntington Library
- In office July 1, 2015 – March 28, 2017
- Preceded by: Steven S. Koblik
- Succeeded by: Steve Hindle (acting); Karen R. Lawrence

5th President of Pitzer College
- In office July 1, 2002 – June 30, 2015
- Preceded by: Marilyn Chapin Massey
- Succeeded by: Thomas Poon (interim); Melvin L. Oliver

Personal details
- Born: Laura Elise Skandera
- Website: lauratrombley.com

Academic background
- Education: Pepperdine University; University of Southern California
- Thesis: The charmed circle: Mark Twain, women and the integration of imagination (1989)
- Doctoral advisor: Jay Martin

Academic work
- Discipline: English Literature
- Institutions: Huntington Library; Pitzer College; Coe College; SUNY Potsdam

Laura Skandera Trombley is an American academic administrator and scholar of Mark Twain. She is the Chair Emerita of the J. William Fulbright Foreign Scholarship Board and was the fifth President of Pitzer College in Claremont, California, and the eighth President of the Huntington Library, Art Collections and Botanical Gardens in San Marino, California. In March 2018, she was named as the tenth president of University of Bridgeport in Bridgeport, Connecticut. On April 2, 2020, Skandera Trombley was named the 16th president of Southwestern University.

== Early life and education ==
Born Laura Elise Skandera to an elementary school principal and second-grade teacher, she enrolled in Pepperdine University at the age of 16 and earned a B.A. in English and humanities by age 20. She graduated with highest honors with a master's degree in English from Pepperdine University. From 1985 to 1988 she was a research associate in the American Studies department at the University of Eichstätt in Germany. She received a Ph.D. in English from the University of Southern California.

== Career ==
After the completion of her Ph.D., Trombley accepted a teaching position at the State University of New York at Potsdam where she earned tenure as an associate professor of English. Trombley also served as assistant provost there. In 1997, she assumed the post of vice president for academic affairs and dean of the faculty at Coe College, the first woman to hold that title. She was named President of Pitzer College at age 40. She was chosen, in 2015, as the first woman President of the Huntington Library, Art Collections, and Botanical Gardens. Trombley became an advisor to the Board of Trustees at the Huntington Library, Art Collections, and Botanical Gardens in 2017 and a consultant to the Libra Foundation and Schiff Foundation. She is an adjunct professor of the practice of English at the University of Southern California.

Trombley began her Mark Twain scholarship while a USC doctoral student, with the largest find of Twain letters to date. At SUNY Potsdam, she was a recipient of the 1994 SUNY Potsdam President's Excellence in Scholarship and Creative Activities Award.

=== Pitzer College presidency ===
Trombley was inaugurated as president of Pitzer College in February 2003. In her first year in office, she made the SAT an optional criterion for admission to the college.

During Trombley's presidency, Pitzer founded the Robert Redford Conservancy for Southern California Sustainability, the Firestone Center for Restoration Ecology in Costa Rica, and the Vaccine Development Institute's partnership with the University of Botswana.

During her tenure, the college's student participation in overseas study increased from 49% to 80% and over 50 student exchanges were established. The admission acceptance rate declined from 56 percent to 11 percent, and the college moved up 35 places in the U.S. News & World Report rankings, from no. 70 in 2004 to no. 35 in 2014. In 2012, Pitzer was named the 20th most selective higher education institution in the country by Business Insider and Pitzer was the top producer of student Fulbright Fellows for five consecutive years, according to The Chronicle of Higher Education.

While she was president, she completed three fundraising campaigns totaling over $110 million and the college's endowment grew from $42 million to $133 million. Trombley established three endowments: the John Skandera student financial aid fund for first generation students, the Laura Skandera Trombley endowment, and the Laura Skandera Trombley Humanities and Arts Endowed Research and Internship Fund.

Trombley's resignation was announced in December 2014, effective June 30, 2015. In June 2015, the faculty made a vote of no confidence, citing concerns about the lack of shared governance during her administration, as a "message to prospective presidential candidates that Pitzer takes issues of shared governance seriously".

=== Huntington Library presidency ===
In 2015 Trombley was appointed president of Huntington Library, becoming the library's first female president. In her first year, she raised $39.4 million, a $9 million increase over the previous year. The Huntington also reached a new high of nearly 40,000 member families and 725,759 visitors. Trombley modified the plan for the final phase of the Chinese Garden, adding a restaurant, outdoor entertainment space, and an art gallery, and completed funding for the 20-year project, with gifts totaling $12 million. In addition, she planned and received a $2.5 million gift for a Director of Research home to be built on the grounds of The Huntington, its first LEED certified building.

She worked to establish internal sustainability and water conservation efforts; organized the first institutional sustainability summit; and signed an agreement with the University of California, Riverside to subsidize the hiring of two assistant professors who will research full-time in The Huntington's collections.

Trombley created the first institutional dashboard; instituted The Huntington Channel to archive videos and webcasts for the public; and created the Out of the Vault Series, to heighten the Huntington's profile in the southern California region. She instituted San Marino Day and made a $5,000 gift in her father's name to honor San Marino educators. She negotiated a new agreement between The Huntington and USC for The Huntington-USC Institute on California and the West (ICW) and USC-Huntington Early Modern Studies Institute (EMSI). In fall 2016, the Jonathan and Karin Fielding Wing opened, a $10.3 million expansion to the Virginia Steele Scott Galleries of American Art designed by Frederick Fisher, along with a major contribution of the Fieldings' collection.

=== University of Bridgeport presidency ===
On March 12, 2018, the University of Bridgeport announced Trombley would succeed Neil Salonen as president, effective July 1, 2018. During her time at Bridgeport, Trombley initiated several significant changes, including the implementation of a three-college structure, an increased focus on connecting education to career, and the creation of The Heckman Center for The Bridgeport Plan.

=== Southwestern University presidency ===
On April 2, 2020, Southwestern University of Texas announced Trombley would succeed Edward Burger as president, effective July 1, 2020.

== Other activity ==
Trombley has served on the board of the Chief Executive Organization, has been a member of The Southern California Forum of The Trusteeship of the International Women's Forum, Rotary International, the Zamorano Club, the Council on Foreign Relations Higher Education Working group on global issues, the Chronicle of Higher Education/New York Times Higher Education Cabinet and the Council of Presidents of the Association of Governing Boards. In December 2012, President Barack Obama named Trombley to the 12-member J. William Fulbright Commission that was established by the U.S. Congress to supervise the global Fulbright Program. In 2014 she served as vice-chair of the commission, and on November 12, 2015, the board elected Trombley chair. In March 2017 was appointed Chair of The Rhodes Trust, District 16 Committee of Selection for the Rhodes Scholarships.

== Honors ==
In 2002, Pepperdine recognized Trombley with a Distinguished Alumna Award, awarding her an honorary doctorate in 2013.

In 2016, Pitzer named Skandera Hall after her, prompting outrage from students and faculty.

She is the 2017 recipient of the Lou Budd Award in recognition of her contributions to the field of Mark Twain studies.

== Works ==
- Edited with Roland Hagenbüche. Epistemology: Turning Points in the History of Poetic Knowledge (1986) ISBN 978-3-79-171029-7
- Mark Twain in the Company of Women (1994) ISBN 978-0-81-221619-6
- Edited Critical Essays on Maxine Hong Kingston (1998) ISBN 978-0-78-380036-3
- Mark Twain's Other Woman: The Hidden Story of His Final Years (2010) ISBN 978-0-30-747494-0
- Edited with Michael E. Kiskis. Constructing Mark Twain: New Directions in Scholarship (2011) ISBN 978-0-82-621968-8

Academic offices
Preceded by Marilyn Chapin Massey	5th President of Pitzer College; 2002 – 2015	Succeeded by Thomas Poon (interim); Melvin L. Oliver
Preceded by Steven S. Koblik	8th President of Huntington Library; 2015 – 2017	Succeeded by Steve Hindle (acting); Karen R. Lawrence
Preceded by Edward Burger; Dale T. Knobel (interim)	16th President of Southwestern University; 2020 – present	Incumbent
