= Judd Walson =

American physician

Judd L. Walson is an infectious disease physician whose research focuses on improving child survival, growth and development among populations in low- and middle-income settings. Walson currently holds the inaugural Robert E. Black Chair of the Department of International Health at the Johns Hopkins University Bloomberg School of Public Health. He is also a Professor of International Health, Medicine (Infectious Disease) and Pediatrics at Johns Hopkins. He joined Johns Hopkins University in 2023 and continues to hold affiliate faculty appointments at the University of Washington.

He is the Co-Director of Childhood Acute Illness and Nutrition Network (CHAIN), a research collaboration of experts from organizations across sub-Saharan Africa and South Asia that investigates how to reduce mortality among acutely ill children.

== Education ==
Walson holds an MD and MPH from Tufts University and a BA in Anthropology from Pitzer College. He did his Internal Medicine and Pediatrics training at Duke University and completed a fellowship in Infectious Disease at the University of Washington.

== Select publications ==
- Ajjampur, Sitara Swarna Rao; et al. (2025). "Feasibility of interrupting the transmission of soil-transmitted helminths: The DeWorm3 community cluster-randomised controlled trial in Benin, India, and Malawi". The Lancet. 406 (10502): 475–488. doi:10.1016/S0140-6736(25)00766-4. PMID 40752908.
- Diallo, Abdoulaye Hama; et al. (2023). "Characterising paediatric mortality during and after acute illness in Sub-Saharan Africa and South Asia: A secondary analysis of the CHAIN cohort using a machine learning approach". eClinicalMedicine. 57 101838. doi:10.1016/j.eclinm.2023.101838. PMC 9941052. PMID 36825237.
- Diallo, Abdoulaye Hama; et al. (2022). "Childhood mortality during and after acute illness in Africa and south Asia: A prospective cohort study". The Lancet Global Health. 10 (5): e673–e684. doi:10.1016/S2214-109X(22)00118-8. PMC 9023747. PMID 35427524.
- Ahmed, Tahmeed; et al. (2021). "Effect of 3 Days of Oral Azithromycin on Young Children with Acute Diarrhea in Low-Resource Settings". JAMA Network Open. 4 (12): e2136726. doi:10.1001/jamanetworkopen.2021.36726. PMC 8678692. PMID 34913980.
- Pavlinac, Patricia B.; Singa, Benson O.; Tickell, Kirkby D.; Brander, Rebecca L.; McGrath, Christine J.; Amondi, Mary; Otieno, Joyce; Akinyi, Elizabeth; Rwigi, Doreen; Carreon, Joseph D.; Tornberg-Belanger, Stephanie N.; Nduati, Ruth; Babigumira, Joseph B.; Meshak, Liru; Bogonko, George; Kariuki, Samuel; Richardson, Barbra A.; John-Stewart, Grace C.; Walson, Judd L. (2021). "Azithromycin for the prevention of rehospitalisation and death among Kenyan children being discharged from hospital: A double-blind, placebo-controlled, randomised controlled trial". The Lancet Global Health. 9 (11): e1569–e1578. doi:10.1016/S2214-109X(21)00347-8. PMC 8638697. PMID 34559992.
- Diallo, Abdoulaye Hama; et al. (2022). "Childhood mortality during and after acute illness in Africa and south Asia: A prospective cohort study". The Lancet Global Health. 10 (5): e673–e684. doi:10.1016/S2214-109X(22)00118-8. PMC 9023747. PMID 35427524.
