= Beggars and Choosers (TV series) =

Television show filmed in Vancouver

- Genre: Comedy drama
- Created by: Peter Lefcourt; Brandon Tartikoff
- Written by: Brad Buckner; Chris Cluess; Wendy Goldman; Charlie Hauck; Peter Lefcourt; Scott Kaufer; Eugenie Ross-Leming; Julia Sayres; Lynn Seifort; David Shore
- Directed by: George Bloomfield; Fred Gerber; Joanna Kerns; Sheldon Larry; Richard J. Lewis; Stuart Margolin; George Mendeluk; Ron Oliver; Ron Orieux; Michael Ritchie; Helen Shaver; Sandy Smolan; Anne Wheeler; Charles Winkler
- Starring: Beau Bridges; Justin Carroll; Colin Cunningham; Kaj-Erik Eriksen; Isabella Hofmann; Carol Kane; Keegan Connor Tracy; Brian Kerwin; Rudolf Martin; William McNamara; Bill Morey; Paul Provenza; Klodyne Rodney; Charlotte Ross; Tuc Watkins
- Theme music composer: David Schwartz
- Composers: Ferocious Fish; Terry Frewer; David Schwartz; Stanley A. Smith; Jim Guttridge
- Countries of origin: United States; Canada
- Original language: English
- No. of seasons: 2
- No. of episodes: 42

Production
- Executive producers: Kim Fleary; Peter Lefcourt; Scott M. Siegler; Lilly Tartikoff
- Producer: Cal Shumiatcher
- Cinematography: Ron Orieux
- Editors: Lee Haxall; Kevin Krasny
- Running time: 60 minutes
- Production companies: Granada Entertainment USA; H. Beale Company

Original release
- Network: Showtime
- Release: June 19, 1999 – February 6, 2001

Beggars and Choosers is an American comedy-drama television series broadcast by Showtime. Developed by Peter Lefcourt and Brandon Tartikoff, the series was a comedic, behind-the-scenes look at network television. Its 42 episodes aired between June 19, 1999, and February 6, 2001.

== Synopsis ==
The tongue-in-cheek series centered on Rob Malone, President of LGT, and his efforts to boost the network's sagging ratings with Lori Volpone, the scheming vice-president of Development, and Malcolm Laffley, a gay man who came out of the closet to clear himself of sexual harassment charges levied against him by a woman. Each episode provided amusing insight into how a network runs, from how its executives deal with temperamental stars to how they make big budget deals while trying to keep the network financially stable.

== Characters ==
- Rob Malone (Brian Kerwin)
- Lori Volpone (Charlotte Ross): The ambitious Vice President of Development for LGT
- Malcolm Laffley (Tuc Watkins)
- Kelly Kramer (Christina Hendricks)
- Cecile Malone (Isabella Hofmann): Rob's wife
- Brad Advail (William McNamara): An agent who is a thorn in Rob's side
- Parker Meridian (Paul Provenza): The egomaniacal star of the hit LGT show Parker's Pals who is romantically involved with Rob's daughter Audrey
- Audrey Malone (Keegan Connor Tracy): Rob and Cecile's slightly flaky 21-year-old daughter
- Emory "E.L." Luddin (Bill Morey): The frequently comatose founder and former CEO of LGT
- Lydia "L.L." Luddin (Carol Kane): E.L.'s wife, whose plans for an eponymous variety show are thwarted when Dan Falco buys the network
- Casey Lenox (Sherri Saum): A young ambitious new hire at LGT that Lori Volpone fears could threaten her career path
- Dan Falco (Beau Bridges): A Buddhist who acquires ownership of LGT after obtaining 53% of the company's stock during a power struggle between the Luddins
- Wayne (Alex Zahara)

== Episodes ==
=== Season 1: 1999–2000 ===
No. overall	No. in season	Title	Directed by	Written by	Original release date
1	1	"The Mountainmen"	Michael Ritchie	Peter Lefcourt	June 19, 1999
2	2	"The Mountainmen"	Michael Ritchie	Peter Lefcourt	June 19, 1999
3	3	"Once More Unto the Breach"	George Bloomfield	Peter Lefcourt	June 26, 1999
4	4	"Hat Trick"	Charles Winkler	Peter Lefcourt	July 3, 1999
5	5	"The Ethel Merman Story"	Sandy Smolan	Peter Lefcourt	July 10, 1999
6	6	"The Deal"	Stuart Margolin	David Shore	July 17, 1999
7	7	"Sex, Drugs & Videotape"	Fred Gerber	Charlie Hauck	July 24, 1999
8	8	"Unsafe Sex"	Stuart Margolin	Peter Lefcourt	July 31, 1999
9	9	"The Velvet Curtain"	Unknown	David Shore	August 7, 1999
10	10	"Touched by an Angel"	Rick Wallace	Story by : Lynn Siefert & David Shore & Charlie Hauck; Teleplay by : David Shore & Charlie Hauck	August 14, 1999
11	11	"Is It Good or Bad for the Jews?"	Sandy Smolan	Charlie Hauck	August 21, 1999
12	12	"White Woman's Burden"	Charles Winkler	Julie Sayres and Eugenie Ross-Leming & Brad Buckner	August 28, 1999
13	13	"Shakedown in Puerto Vallarta"	Sandy Smolan	Peter Lefcourt	September 4, 1999
14	14	"Don't Try This at Home"	Charles Winkler	David Shore	September 11, 1999
15	15	"Star Whores"	Richard Martin	Brad Buckner & Eugenie Ross-Leming	November 27, 1999
16	16	"Always Leave 'Em Laughing"	Unknown	Peter Lefcourt	December 4, 1999
17	17	"Faith, Hope & Chastity"	Unknown	Eugenie Ross-Leming & Brad Buckner	December 11, 1999
18	18	"Russian Roulette"	Michael Ritchie	Eugenie Ross-Leming & Brad Buckner	February 19, 2000
19	19	"Death in Malibu"	Charles Winkler	Peter Lefcourt	February 26, 2000
20	20	"Fasten Your Seatbelts"	Richard J. Lewis	Eugenie Ross-Leming & Brad Buckner	March 4, 2000
21	21	"Disinformed Sources"	Joanna Kerns	Peter Lefcourt	March 11, 2000
22	22	"The Cherry Orchard"	Unknown	Peter Lefcourt	March 18, 2000

=== Season 2: 2000–01 ===
No. overall	No. in season	Title	Directed by	Written by	Original release date
23	1	"PMS.com"	Joanna Kerns	Peter Lefcourt	June 27, 2000
24	2	"Fifty Three Percent Solution"	Anne Wheeler	Scott Kaufer	July 4, 2000
25	3	"Sex and Violence"	Richard J. Lewis	Brad Buckner & Eugenie Ross-Leming	July 11, 2000
26	4	"Dog Day Afternoon"	Sheldon Larry	Peter Lefcourt	July 18, 2000
27	5	"The Naked Truth"	Richard J. Lewis	Scott Kaufer	July 25, 2000
28	6	"An Asian in the Sun"	Ron Oliver	Chris Cluess	August 1, 2000
29	7	"The Leak"	Fred Gerber	Wendy Goldman	August 8, 2000
30	8	"Hello Dalai"	Stuart Margolin	Eugenie Ross-Leming & Brad Buckner	August 15, 2000
31	9	"Zero Tolerance"	George Mendeluk	Peter Lefcourt	August 22, 2000
32	10	"The Wartime Consigliere"	Stuart Margolin	Scott Kaufer	August 29, 2000
33	11	"Be Careful What You Wish For"	Helen Shaver	Brad Buckner & Eugenie Ross-Leming	September 5, 2000
34	12	"Killer Sushi"	George Bloomfield	Peter Lefcourt	September 12, 2000
35	13	"The Woodhouse Conundrum"	Ron Oliver	Scott Kaufer	December 5, 2000
36	14	"Moles, Meatloaf & Myrna Loy"	David Warry-Smith	Eugenie Ross-Leming & Brad Buckner	December 12, 2000
37	15	"Fathers & Sons"	Helen Shaver	Peter Lefcourt	January 2, 2001
38	16	"Hitting the Bottle"	Charles Winkler	Scott Kaufer	January 9, 2001
39	17	"Golf War Syndrome"	Cal Shumiatcher	Brad Buckner & Eugenie Ross-Leming	January 16, 2001
40	18	"We'll Always Have Burbank"	Charles Winkler	Scott Kaufer	January 23, 2001
41	19	"From Russia with Love"	Stuart Margolin	Eugenie Ross-Leming & Brad Buckner	January 30, 2001
42	20	"The Long Goodbye"	Richard J. Lewis	Peter Lefcourt	February 6, 2001

== Production notes ==
The series was created by former NBC television executive Brandon Tartikoff who based the series on his own experiences. Tartikoff, whose wife Lily served as a producer on the series, died of Hodgkin's Disease two years before the series debuted.

Filmed in Vancouver, Beggars and Choosers was produced for Showtime by Granada Entertainment USA and distributed by Buena Vista Television.

== Reception and cancellation ==
Beggars and Choosers garnered very positive reviews from critics and, according to Showtime executive vice president of original programming Gary Levine, had a loyal audience, but ratings for the series remained low. Showtime canceled the series after two seasons in December 2000.

== Awards and nominations ==
Year	Award	Category	Recipient	Result	Refs
2000	Casting Society of America	Best Casting for TV, Comedy Pilot	Marc Hirschfeld, Meg Liberman, and Joel Thurm	Nominated	
2000	Primetime Emmy Awards	Outstanding Guest Actor in a Comedy Series	Carl Reiner	Nominated	
2001	Canadian Comedy Awards	Television – Pretty Funny Direction – Series	Charles Winkler	Nominated	
2001	GLAAD Media Awards	Outstanding TV Comedy Series	Beggars and Choosers	Nominated	
