= Adam Weinberg =

Adam Weinberg may refer to:

- Adam D. Weinberg, art museum curator and director
- Adam S. Weinberg (born 1965), American sociologist and academic administrator
