= Bruce Karatz =

American businessman and philanthropist

- Born: October 10, 1945 (age 81); Chicago, Illinois, U.S.
- Education: Boston University (B.A.); USC Gould School of Law (J.D)
- Known for: Chairman and CEO of KB Home
- Political party: Democratic
- Spouse(s): Janet Dreisen (divorced); Sandra Lee (divorced); Lilly Tartikoff
- Children: 3, including Matthew Karatz

Bruce E. Karatz (born October 10, 1945) is an American businessman and philanthropist. He was chairman and CEO of KB Home, and engaged in philanthropic efforts to help rebuild both Los Angeles after the L.A. Riots and New Orleans following Hurricane Katrina. Karatz was CEO for two decades while KB Home grew revenues from $491 million to $11 billion and annual home deliveries increased from 4,500 homes in 1986 to over 39,000 homes in 2006. In March 2013, Karatz was a recipient of The Malibu Times' 23rd Annual Dolphin Awards. Karatz operates BK Capital LLC based in Beverly Hills, California.

== Early life ==
Karatz was born in Chicago, Illinois, and raised in Minneapolis, Minnesota, in a middle class Jewish family. His father owned a movie theater and his mother was a homemaker. He graduated from high school in 1963 and from Boston University in 1967. Karatz received his Juris Doctor degree from the University of Southern California in 1970.

== Career ==
In 1972, Karatz joined Kaufman & Broad (the company took the KB Home name in 2001) as an associate general counsel.

After spending a short time as an in-house counsel, Karatz moved to the home building side of the business and soon thereafter became head of KB Home’s French division. He made a mark in 1977 when he installed a full-sized model home on the roof of the Au Printemps department store. More than 500,000 people toured the rooftop house. During his time in France, KB Home grew into one of France's largest homebuilders.

In 1981 Karatz rejoined the Los Angeles headquarters of KB Home and in 1986 was named CEO. As CEO, Karatz oversaw the company’s growth into one of the most successful home building companies in the world. Karatz is credited with changing the company’s business model of building homes on speculation and then selling them, in favor of building houses on order. KB Home's new business model allowed middle class home buyers to customize their homes and defined a far more efficient and profitable business model for the industry.

In the early 1990s, when the real estate market in Southern California collapsed, Karatz moved aggressively to expand the company by acquiring other regional home builders such as the San Antonio-based builder Rayco for $105 million in 1996. The success of the new business model led KB Home to acquire additional companies and expand organically into markets across the country to provide customized homes for middle-class families.

As CEO, Karatz built on his Paris marketing achievements. Working with Fox Broadcasting, which was celebrating the tenth anniversary of The Simpsons, KB Home constructed a real-life replica of the Simpsons' home in one of KB Home's Nevada subdivisions, which helped turn Las Vegas into KB Home's top market.

During his tenure as CEO, KB Home became a Fortune 500 company. Karatz oversaw a 1476% increase in the company’s market capitalization, an 800% increase in the company stock price, a 575% growth in revenue, a 400% rise in dividends, and an increase in the number of employees from less than 500 to over 6,000. In 2006, KB Home was ranked the #1 homebuilder in Fortune Magazine’s 2006 list of America’s Most Admired Companies and was listed by Fortune as one of America’s Most Admired Companies[4] and won the American Business Award as the Best Overall Company. Karatz in turn became one of the country's highest-paid CEOs during this time.

In 2005, Karatz's last full year as chairman and CEO, KB Home’s profits were $1.29 billion. On November 12, 2006, Karatz retired from KB Home and agreed to pay the company the profits he received based on KB Home’s stock option back-dating procedures.

=== Recent career ===
In October 2014, Karatz partnered with Guy Nafilyan, the former chairman and CEO of Kaufman & Broad France, to create the Paris-based real estate development company called Nafilyan & Partners. Karatz and Nafilyan each own 37.5% of the company and the remaining 25% is owned by two investment groups and two financial institutions. Nafilyan & Partners opened for sale its first development in Villepinte, a suburb of Paris, France on October 11, 2014. As of October 2014, Nafilyan & Partners has 22 projects representing approximately 2,000 residences throughout suburban Paris. In 2017, Nafilyan & Partners was purchased by Belgian property developer Immobel. The purchase was completed in 2019.

== Philanthropic activities ==
After the Los Angeles riots in 1992, Kaufman and Broad spearheaded the effort to rebuild Camp Hollywoodland, a rustic canyon retreat for inner-city children whose main hall, dining room and other structures were gutted by fire.

In the early 1990s, Karatz co-chaired along with Los Angeles Mayor Richard Riordan the Mayor’s Alliance for a Safer LA, which raised over $16 million to place computers in all LA precincts.

In December 2005, shortly after Hurricane Katrina, Karatz directed that KB Home become the first, and at that time only, national homebuilder to go to New Orleans to support rebuilding efforts in the wake of Hurricane Katrina. KB Home acquired 74 finished lots in downtown New Orleans and bought 3,000 acres in Jefferson Parish. At the time, Karatz said,

"We're now seven, eight months into post-Katrina, and we're the only ones that have stepped up. I honestly think that's part of the problem with New Orleans: It's a weak business community. And I personally felt it was important for a company like ours to do something, because if we waited for others, we could be waiting a long time. And if we're successful, it will motivate others."

Karatz had to overcome reservations of KB Homes’ Board of Directors. Fortune Magazine wrote at the time, "It’s not often you hear a CEO express goals in humanitarian, not bottom-line, terms, especially when its shareholder money with which he’s do-gooding."

Karatz agreed to make KB Home the builder for an episode of ABC’s Extreme Makeover Home Edition after listening to a pitch from employees. The show featured a family headed by a single mother, Patricia Broadbent, who had been diagnosed with lung cancer and had seven children. Six of the children were adopted, and three of them were born with HIV.

Broadbent is a longtime children’s advocate, former social worker, and an internationally recognized AIDS activist.

Rather than remodel the family’s home, Karatz decided to raze it and build a 3,200-square-foot (300 m^{2}) home in 48 hours. Hundreds of workers and KB Home demolished the Broadbents’ 1,450-square-foot (135 m^{2}) cinderblock house while Ms. Broadbent and three of her daughters were on vacation. In the closing moments of the episode, Karatz tore up the family’s mortgage, promised to pay off the entire loan on their behalf, and said they’d never have to worry about making those payments again.

In 2007, Karatz founded the Keep Your Home Foundation to support people in California facing foreclosures as a result of the mortgage crisis. Keep Your Home Foundation supports a clearinghouse website to provide information to homeowners facing foreclosure.

From May 2010 to August 2011, Karatz worked as a full-time volunteer with the non-profit, HomeBoy Industries, which provides a second chance to formerly incarcerated gang members by training them to reenter society. Today, Karatz is a member of the Homeboy Industries’ Board of Trustees.

Karatz other philanthropic/non-profit initiatives have included:

- Rand Corporation (Board of Trustees 1995-2006 and Vice-Chairman 2004; Chairman, Rand Education Committee 1994-2003)
- California Business Roundtable (Chair)
- Los Angeles World Affairs Council (Chair)
- Council on Foreign Relations
- USC Board of Trustees
- USC Gould School of Law Board of Councilors (Chair)
- Wilshire Boulevard Temple (President)
- DARE (Director)
- Children’s Institute International (Director)
- National Park Foundation (Director)
- Co-Chair of the Mayor’s Alliance for Safer L.A.
- YMCA of Metropolitan LA (Director)
- KCET, Board of Directors
- Pitzer College (Trustee)
- Coro (Director)
- Honeywell (Director)
- Kroger (Director)
- Edison International (Director)
- National Golf Properties (Director)
- Avery-Dennison (Director)
- The Broad Museum, Los Angeles Board of Trustees

Karatz has been recognized for his philanthropic leadership, including:

- HomeBoy Community Service Award (2012)
- Human Relations Award, American Jewish Committee (2004)
- Ellis Island Medal of Honor, National Ethnic Coalition of Organizations (2003)
- Crystal Angel Award, Los Angeles Police Foundation (2002)
- Distinguished Humanitarian Award, B'nai B'rith (2000)
- Chevalier of the Legion of Honor, Presented by the Pres. of France (1999) - automatically rescinded due to conviction of a misdemeanor
- Spirit of Life Award, City of Hope National Medical Center (1996)
- Jack Webb Award, LA Police Historical Society (1995)
- Distinguished Service Award, The Aviva Center (1994)
- Humanitarian of the Year Award, National Association of Christians and Jews (1984)

== Political activity ==
Over the years, Karatz generated attention over his support of Democratic candidates, including Bill Clinton, Barack Obama, Al Gore, Antonio Villaraigosa, and Dianne Feinstein (according to public campaign finance records.)

== Legal ==
On September 15, 2008, Karatz settled civil charges brought by the Securities and Exchange Commission ("SEC") arising out of these stock option back-dating procedures. On November 10, 2010, a federal judge sentenced Karatz to probation for a term of five years. The federal judge later entered an order providing for the early termination of Karatz’s five-year term of probation effective April 27, 2012. The sentence of probation was based on a report of the U.S. Probation Office concluding that Karatz’s "conduct does not appear to have resulted in any pecuniary harm" to KB Home or its shareholders and stating as follows:

Truly, in the collective 30 plus-year experience of the undersigned Probation Officer and Supervising Probation Officer, this office has never seen such an array of efforts to assist the community . . . These letters [submitted on Mr. Karatz’s behalf] all note the defendant’s support during times of need. Most notably, the letters describe the involvement of the defendant and reflect a participation that involved much more than mere financial donations. This is not a man who simply shared his wealth. He extensively shared his expertise and time as well.

== Family life ==
Karatz has been married three times. From 1968 to 2001, he was married to Janet Dreisen, an art consultant and board member of various arts and other non-profit institutions in Los Angeles. From 2001 to 2005 he was married to Sandra Lee, a television personality. Lee converted to Judaism. Since 2009, Karatz has been married to Lilly Tartikoff, a leading cancer activist best known for co-founding the annual Revlon Run/Walk events in New York City and Los Angeles and Revlon/UCLA Women's Cancer Research Program, which helped raise more than $80 million for cancer research.

Karatz has three adult children, Elizabeth, Matthew, and Teddy, and 8 grandchildren. Elizabeth is the founder and chief executive officer of La Loop, a privately owned firm that manufactures and sells a line of patented eyeglass products. Matthew was Deputy Mayor of the City of Los Angeles and the head of the City’s Office of Economic and Business Policy. He has oversight of all housing-related City departments from the Los Angeles Department of Water and Power asset and real estate management to the City Planning Department. Teddy is the managing director of a private equity firm.
