= Michael Starbird =

American mathematician

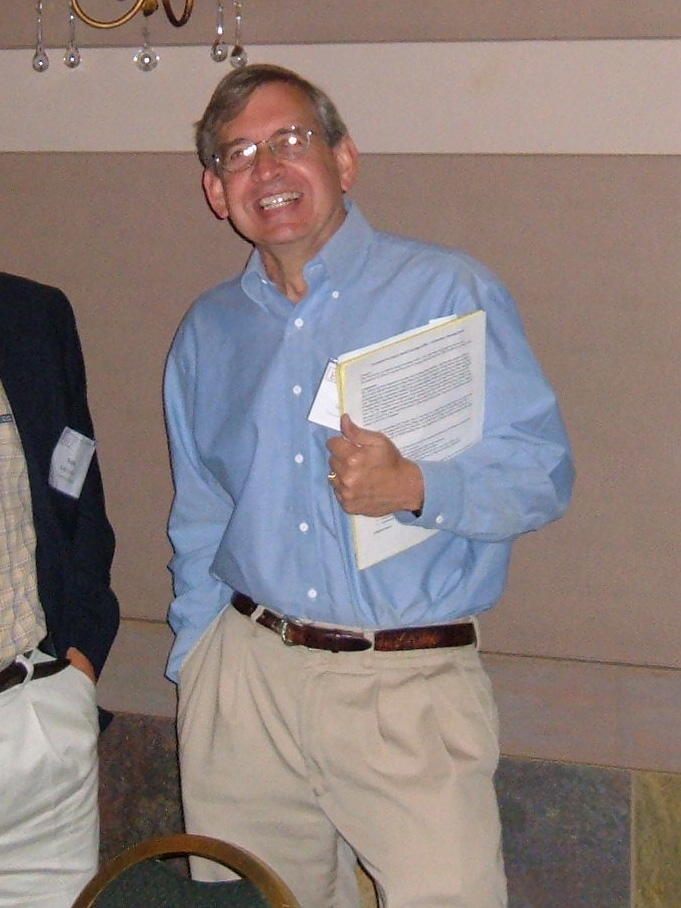
Michael Starbird in 2008

Michael P. Starbird (born 1948) is a Professor of Mathematics and a University of Texas Distinguished Teaching Professor in the Department of Mathematics at the University of Texas at Austin. He received his B.A from Pomona College and his Ph.D. in mathematics from the University of Wisconsin–Madison.

Starbird's mathematical specialty is topology. He joined the University of Texas at Austin as a faculty member in 1974, and served as an associate dean in Natural Sciences from 1989 to 1997. He serves on the national education committees of the Mathematical Association of America and the American Mathematical Society.

He directs UT's Inquiry Based Learning Project and works to promote the use of Inquiry Based Learning methods of instruction nationally.

== Awards ==
He has received over fifteen teaching awards including the Deborah and Franklin Haimo Award for Distinguished College or University Teaching of Mathematics in 2007; the Minnie Stevens Piper Professor award, which is a Texas statewide award given to professors in any subject in any college in the state of Texas; the UT System Regents’ Outstanding Teaching Award in its inaugural year; membership in the UT System Academy of Distinguished Teachers in its inaugural year; member and chair of UT Austin's Academy of Distinguished Teachers; and has received most of the UT-wide teaching awards. He is an inaugural year Fellow of the American Mathematical Society. He received an honorary Doctor of Science degree from Pomona College in 2014.

== Administrative work and Service ==
Starbird served as Associate Dean for Academic and Student Affairs and as Associate Dean for Undergraduate Education in the College of Natural Sciences from 1989 to 1997. He has served on the Steering Committee of the Academy of Distinguished Teachers since 2000 and is currently chair.

He has accepted visiting positions at the Institute for Advanced Study in Princeton, The University of California at San Diego, and the Jet Propulsion Laboratory. In 2012 he became a fellow of the American Mathematical Society, in his inaugural year.

Starbird has served on the national education committees of both the American Mathematical Society and the Mathematical Association of America. He currently serves on the MAA's Committee on the Undergraduate Program and is a member of the Steering Committee for the next CUPM Curriculum Guide.

== Publications ==
He has produced DVD courses for The Teaching Company in the Great Courses Series on calculus, statistics, probability, geometry, and the joy of thinking, which have reached hundreds of thousands of people worldwide. Since 2000, he has given over 200 invited lectures and presented more than 35 workshops on effective teaching to faculty members. He has co-authored two Inquiry Based Learning textbooks published by the MAA: (with David Marshall and Edward Odell) Number Theory Through Inquiry and (with Brian Katz) Distilling Ideas: An Introduction to Mathematical Thinking in the new Mathematics Through Inquiry subseries of the MAA Textbook Series. He has written three books with co-author Edward B. Burger: The Heart of Mathematics: An invitation to effective thinking (in its 4th edition and winner of a Robert Hamilton book award); Coincidences, Chaos, and All That Math Jazz: Making Light of Weighty Ideas (which has been translated into eight languages); and The 5 Elements of Effective Thinking (which is published by Princeton University Press, has translation contracts in 16 languages, and was a 2013 Independent Publisher Book Award Silver Medal winner). The book, The Heart of Mathematics: An Invitation to Effective Thinking was acclaimed by the American Mathematical Monthly as possibly the best math book for nonmathematicians it had ever reviewed. It won a 2001 Robert W. Hamilton Book Award.

Starbird has created several innovative courses at UT including a mathematics course for liberal arts students. In 2014, he produced one of UT's first Massive Open Online Courses (MOOCs). His MOOC was called Effective Thinking Through Mathematics, whose title summarizes much of his goal for education.

== Courses for The Teaching Company ==
Starbird has developed several courses for The Teaching Company:

- Change and Motion: Calculus Made Clear
- Joy of Thinking: The Beauty and Power of Classical Mathematical Ideas
- Meaning from Data: Statistics Made Clear
- What Are the Chances? Probability Made Clear
- Mathematics from the Visual World
