= Charles Martinez =

American professor and higher-education administrator

Charles Martinez is an American professor and higher education administrator. He has held positions at the University of Oregon and University of Texas Austin.

== Early life and education ==
Charles Martinez, Jr., was born and raised in southern California and identifies as a third-generation Mexican American. His parents divorced when he was young and he lived, at various times, with his father, mother, or extended family members. He graduated with honors from Pitzer College as a first-generation college student. While attending Pitzer he worked a full-time job to pay his tuition. He received his master's degree and PhD from the California School of Professional Psychology.

== Administrator ==
Charles Martinez worked at the University of Oregon for nearly 20 years. He served as vice president for institutional equity and diversity from 2005 - 2011. He then founded The Center for Equity Promotion in 2012 and served as the director. While at UofO, Martinez also served as the chair of the Oregon State Board of Education for two years.

Charles Martinez was appointed as the Dean of the College of Education at University of Texas Austin on January 1, 2019. In 2020 UT Austin surpassed 25% Hispanic undergraduate enrollment for the first time, qualifying the school as a Hispanic Serving Institution, Martinez served as a member of the Hispanic Serving Institution Transition Committee.

On May 20, 2022, Oregon State University Board of Trustees announced Charles Martinez as one of two candidates for the position of President of the university.

== Honors ==
Named Philip H. Knight Professor at the University of Oregon in 2017.
