= Melvin L. Oliver =

American sociologist and academic administrator

Melvin Oliver

6th President of Pitzer College
- In office July 1, 2016 – June 30, 2022
- Preceded by: Laura Skandera Trombley; Thomas Poon (interim)
- Succeeded by: Jill A. Klein (interim); Strom C. Thacker

Personal details
- Born: 1950 (age 75–76) Pittsburgh, Pennsylvania, U.S.
- Education: William Penn University (BA); Washington University (MA, PhD)

Academic background
- Thesis: More than a game: A case study of family orientations to community baseball (1977)

Academic work
- Discipline: Sociology
- Institutions: University of California, Los Angeles; University of California, Santa Barbara; Pitzer College

Melvin L. Oliver is an American academic administrator and professor who served as the sixth president of Pitzer College. He was the first African American to become president of one of the Claremont Colleges.

== Early life and education ==
Oliver was born in Pittsburgh, Pennsylvania in 1950, and raised in Cleveland, Ohio. Oliver earned his Bachelor of Arts at William Penn University and his Master of Arts and PhD from Washington University in St. Louis.

== Career ==
Oliver served as the executive dean at the UCSB College of Letters and Science, where he was also the Sara Miller McCune Dean of Social Sciences and a professor of sociology. In addition to his career in academics, Oliver has served as the vice president of the Asset Building and Community Development Program at the Ford Foundation. Oliver worked as a professor of sociology at the University of California, Los Angeles from 1978 to 1996, and helped establish the UCLA Center for the Study of Urban Poverty.

Oliver's tenure at Pitzer included the controversial vetoing of a vote to suspend the college's study abroad program at the University of Haifa to protest Israel's occupation of the West Bank.

On February 3, Oliver announced his plans to retire from his post as the president of Pitzer College at the end of the 2021–2022 academic year.
