= Barry Sanders (professor) =

American academic and author

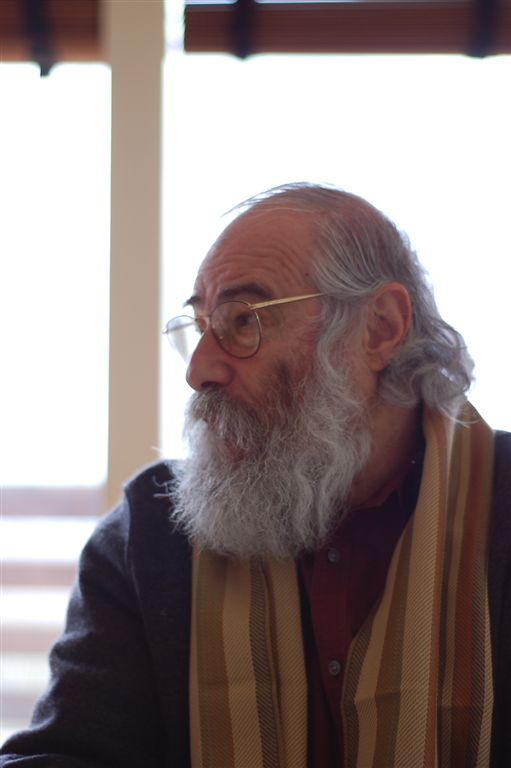
Barry Sanders Ph.D.

Barry Sanders is an American writer and academic. His projects occur increasingly at the intersection of art and activism, and include The Green Zone: The Environmental Costs of Militarism, which Project Censored named one of the top-ten censored stories of 2009, and "Over These Prison Walls," which invites collaborations between artists and incarcerated youth. He is the author of fourteen books and over fifty essays and articles . His 2002 essay for Cabinet, "Bang the Keys Softly: Type-Writers and Their Dis-Contents," has been reprinted in Courier (University Art Museum, SUNY) as well as Ghost in the Machine (New Museum) the catalogue for the art exhibition by the same title that surveyed the constantly shifting relationship between humans, machines, and art.

His book-art projects include a collaboration with printmaker Michael Woodcock, Fourteen Ninety Two or Three, which won Honorable Mention in the Carl Hertzog Awards for Excellence in Book Design. He has given presentations at the Los Angeles County Museum of Art (with Ivan Illich); the J. Paul Getty Museum; and the Portland Art Museum, among many others. In 2013, co-curated the show Infinity Device with Anne-Marie Oliver at the Historic Maddox Building in Portland, Oregon.

Sanders has had an extensive academic career and was the first to occupy the Gold Chair at Pitzer College, where he taught the history of ideas and medieval church iconography among other things. Along with Anne-Marie Oliver, he founded and chaired the MA in Critical Theory and Creative Research Program at the Hallie Ford School of Graduate Studies, Pacific Northwest College of Art. He is the Founding Executive Co-director of the Oregon Institute for Creative Research with Anne-Marie Oliver.

== Academic and writing career ==
Sanders received an MS from the University of California, Los Angeles in 1960, and an MA from USC—University of Southern California in 1963. He earned a doctorate in Medieval literature from USC in 1966.

Sanders joined the faculty at Southern Illinois University, and helped students start a radical newspaper to protest the war in Vietnam and organized a three-day teach-in. He received death threats and a request from administrators to take his talents elsewhere. A stint at Valley State College (CSUN) in California ended the same way, Sanders was fired in 1971 not long after being arrested at an anti-war protest along with 200 students.

Sanders' book Alienable Rights: The Exclusion of African Americans in a White Man's Land, 1619–2000, with co-author Francis D. Adams, was named a "Notable Book of the Year" by The Detroit Free Press.

In 1972 he started teaching at Pitzer College in Claremont where he became the Gold Chair, and was a professor in the departments of Literature and the History of Ideas for 33 years. He was the first to hold the Peter S. and Gloria Gold Chair at Pitzer, and retired from the college in 2005.

In 2005 Sanders won a five-year appointment as Senior Fulbright Scholar, to investigate the idea of the Commons in Greece.

He was featured on WNYC's Radiolab program in 2008, and is a contributing editor of North American Review.

Sanders taught at Pacific Northwest College of Art (PNCA) in the Pearl District of Portland, Oregon. He and Anne Marie Oliver are the Founding Co-chairs of the MA in Critical Theory and Creative Research at the PNCA Hallie Ford School of Graduate Studies and the Ford Institute for Visual Education. His projects increasingly occur at the intersection of art and activism.

=== Publications ===
Barry Sanders is the author and co-author of fourteen books and over fifty essays and articles, and has twice been a finalist for the Oregon Book Award.

==== Author ====
- A is for Ox: Violence, Electronic Media, and the Silencing of the Written Word (1994)
- Sudden Glory: Laughter as Subversive History (1996) — Explores the history of laughter, emphasizing the ways in which it has been used as a means of political subversion.
- The Private Death of Public Discourse (1998) — thesis is that civil public discourse is possible only if there is the necessary corollary of truly introspective quest for meaning.
- The Green Zone: The Environmental Costs of US Militarism (2009) — (finalist in the 2011 Oregon Book Award general nonfiction category.)
- Unsuspecting Souls: The Disappearance of The Human Being (2010) — the collusion of drugs and aesthetics in the late nineteenth century Victorian era. (finalist in the 2011 Oregon Book Award general nonfiction category.)
- The Manifesto of Herman Melville (2025) - argues that Moby Dick is more than a novel in that it can be read as Melville's manifesto about the destruction of the natural world.

==== Co-author ====
- The Sacred Paw: The Bear in Nature, Myth, and Literature (1985) — co-author Paul Shepard.
- ABC, The Alphabetization of the Popular Mind (1988) — co-author Ivan Illich, on the shift from orality to literacy in the European Middle Ages.
- Alienable Rights: The Exclusion of African Americans in a White Man's Land, 1619–2000 (2004), co-author Francis D. Adams.
