= Dale T. Knobel =

Dale Knobel

Interim President of Southwestern University
- In office January 2020 – July 2020
- Preceded by: Edward Burger

19th President of Denison University
- In office 1998–2013
- Preceded by: Michele Tolela Myers
- Succeeded by: Adam S. Weinberg

Personal details
- Born: Dale Thomas Knobel; 1949 (age 76–77) East Cleveland, Ohio, U.S.
- Education: Yale College (BA); Northwestern University (PhD)

Dale Thomas Knobel (born 1949 in East Cleveland, Ohio) is an American historian and academic administrator. He served as the 19th president of Denison University, and served as interim president of Southwestern University in 2020.

== Early life and career ==
Knobel, the son of an oil executive, was born in East Cleveland, Ohio and raised in Mayfield Heights, Lyndhurst, Worthington, and Hudson, all suburbs of Columbus or Cleveland. Attracted from Hudson High School to play soccer at Denison University, he left Denison after one year to study history at Yale College. He earned his B.A. and graduated cum laude in 1971.

Knobel continued studying history at Northwestern University and received his PhD in 1976. After one year of post-graduate teaching at Northwestern, he joined the history department at Texas A&M University, where he remained for nineteen years. Knobel's scholarship focused on American ethnic and race relations with a particular focus on pop-culture responses to international immigration near the turn of the 20th century.

In 1987, Knobel became dean director of Texas A&M's new University Honors program and, five years later, became executive director of honors programs and academic scholarships. In 1995 he served as Associate Provost for Undergraduate Programs, and in 1996 was made provost of Southwestern University.

=== Denison University ===
Knobel was named Denison's 19th president in 1998 and served in this role for 15 years, the second-longest in the college's history. Knobel also more than doubled the endowment of the college, from $300 million to $700 million.

During his tenure as Denison’s president, Knobel served on numerous boards and councils in higher education. He was a member of the executive committee of the National Association of Independent Colleges and Universities, the Division III President’s Council of the NCAA, the American Council on Education’s Commission on Women in Higher Education, the Governing Council of the Wye Faculty Seminar of the Aspen Institute, and the board of trustees of the Institute for the International Education of Students. He was board chair of the Great Lakes Colleges Association, the Five Colleges of Ohio, and Ohio Campus Compact, and he served on the executive committees of the Ohio Foundation of Independent Colleges and the Association of Independent Colleges and Universities of Ohio. He was twice president of the North Coast Athletic Conference. Some of Knobel’s writing on higher education topics appears in chapters in University Presidents as Moral Leaders and Out in Front: The College President as the Face of the Institution. In 2012, Knobel received the Chief Executive Leadership Award at the Council for Advancement and Support of Education Region V annual meeting.

In 2013, Knobel retired as president and was succeeded by Adam S. Weinberg, a sociologist.

=== Southwestern University ===
From January 2020 to July 2020, Knobel served as interim president of Southwestern University, following the departure of Dr. Edward Burger.

== Personal life ==
Knobel lives with his wife, Tina J. Knobel, in Georgetown, Texas. He serves on the board of directors of the Sherman Fairchild Foundation, and the board of trustees of the American University of Sharjah.
