= Thomas Poon =

Scientist and academic leader

17th President of Loyola Marymount University
- Incumbent
- Assumed office June 1, 2025
- Preceded by: Timothy Law Snyder

President of Pitzer College
- Interim
- In office July 1, 2015 – June 30, 2016
- Preceded by: Laura Skandera Trombley
- Succeeded by: Melvin L. Oliver
- Scientific career
- Education: Fairfield University; University of California, Los Angeles
- Fields: Chemistry
- Workplaces: Loyola Marymount University
- Thesis: Trans-cyclooctene as a mechanistic tool in the ene reactions of singlet oxygen and triazolinediones and photophysical properties of metallated fullerenes (1995)

Thomas Poon is an American chemist serving as the 17th President of the Loyola Marymount University. Previously, he served as Executive Vice President and Provost of the institution, as well as Acting President of Pitzer College in 2014, and Interim President from July 2015 to July 2016.

== Early life and education ==
Thomas Poon earned his Bachelor of Science in chemistry from Fairfield University in 1990 and a PhD in organic chemistry from the University of California, Los Angeles in 1995.

In an interview, Poon stated that he is the son of an immigrant father. He has cited his father, who brought his family to the United States, as a significant personal inspiration.

== Pitzer College ==
Poon co-authored a chemistry textbook called Introduction to Organic Chemistry, 4th Edition in 2010, which was published by John Wiley and Sons, Inc. He is a member of the American Chemical Society and the Council on Undergraduate Research. He has contributed to a number of notable research projects.

In January 2014, Pitzer College President Laura Skandera Trombley announced she had tapped Poon to serve as Acting President during a leave of absence she would be taking in the autumn. Poon assumed the role of Acting President in September 2014.

He has travelled abroad on behalf of Pitzer College. He also participated in the Pitzer College ALS Ice Bucket Challenge in September 2014 using only a small glass of ice water, in an effort to raise awareness about the disease and the California drought.
