= John W. Atherton =

Founding president of Pitzer College

John Atherton
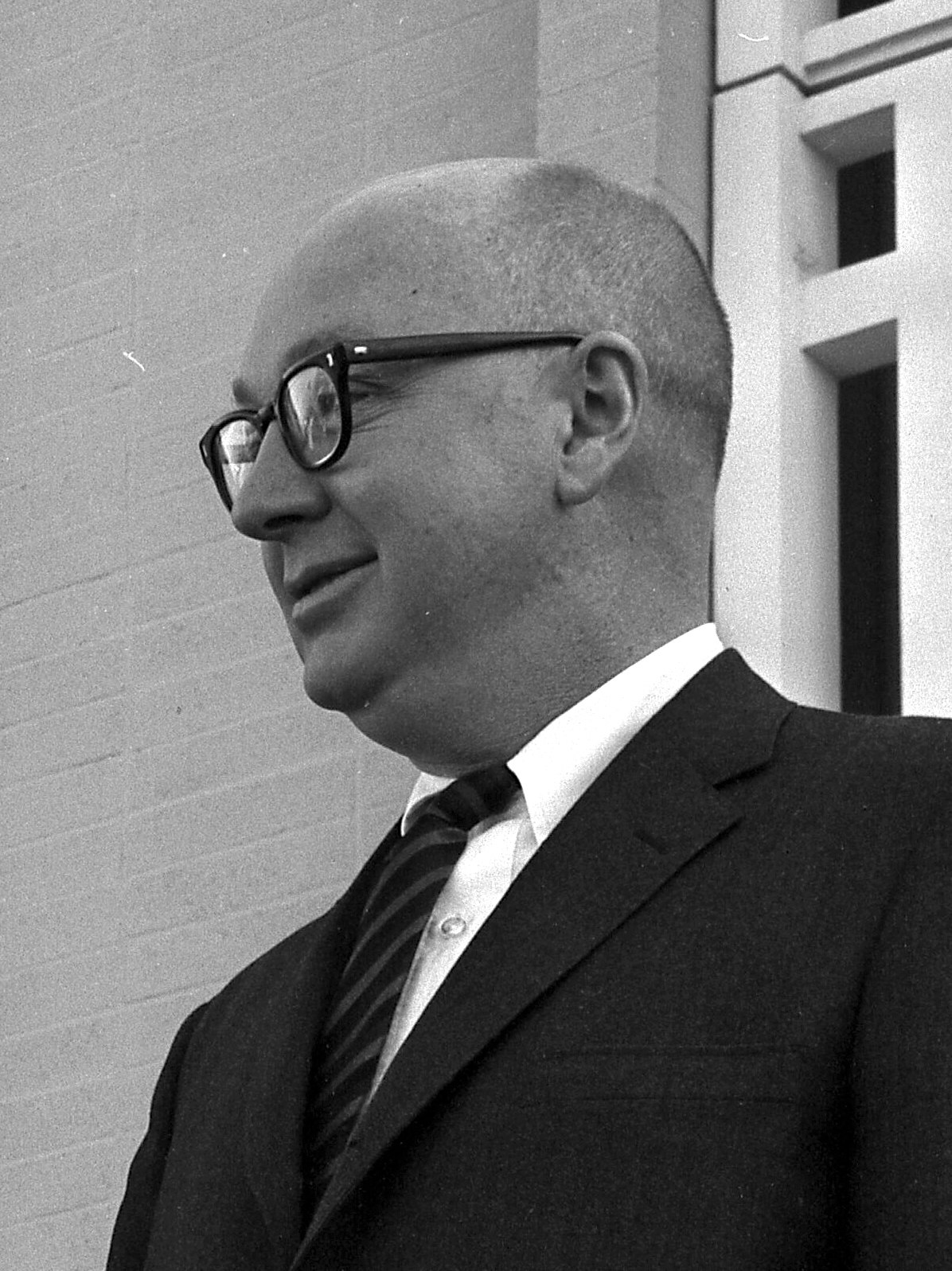
- Atherton in 1965

1st President of Pitzer College
- In office 1963–1970
- Preceded by: Position established
- Succeeded by: Robert H. Atwell

Personal details
- Born: October 17, 1916 Minneapolis, Minnesota
- Died: October 30, 2001 (aged 85) Claremont, California
- Children: 3
- Education: Amherst College (BA); University of Chicago (MA, PhD)

Military service
- Branch/service: United States Navy
- Battles/wars: World War II

John William Atherton (October 17, 1916 – October 30, 2001) was an American poet, professor, and the founding president of Pitzer College.

== Early life and education ==
John William Atherton was born in Minneapolis, Minnesota, the son of George R. Atherton.

Atherton began his academic career at Iowa State College, but left to serve as a torpedo and gunnery officer in the United States Navy during World War II.

He earned his bachelor’s degree in English from Amherst College and master’s and doctoral degrees in literature from the University of Chicago.

== Career ==
Active in the United States Naval Reserve for many years, he studied Russian in the Navy School of Oriental Language at Boulder, Colorado.

In 1955 and 1956, he was a Fulbright lecturer at the Tokyo University of Foreign Studies.

From 1963 Atherton served as Dean of Faculty and a professor of English at Claremont Men's College, which is now known as Claremont McKenna College.

=== Pitzer College Founding President ===
Over a period of seventeen months he recruited students, faculty, and trustees and constructed Scott and Sanborn Halls in time for the fall 1964 semester. During the College's first year, students and faculty created the curriculum and the school's system of governance.

Under his tenure the campus grew from 150 students to 650.

He remained president of Pitzer College until June 1970.

Atherton returned to Claremont, California when he retired in 1985.

=== Literary works ===
His poems and short stories were published in magazines such as the Saturday Review, The New Yorker, and The Yale Review.

=== Other appointments ===
In 1968, he was appointed to the board of governors of the Otis College of Art and Design in Los Angeles, California.

== Personal life ==
Atherton married Virginia Richards in 1941. They had three children; John, Thomas and Carol. Atherton died on October 30, 2001, at the age of 85.

== Legacy ==
Atherton was honored in 2004 by the Pitzer College community with the opening of a new residence hall bearing his name.

The John W. Atherton Scholarship is available to seniors majoring in both English and World Literature when attending Pitzer College.

== See also ==
- Pitzer College
