= Firestone Reserve =

Protected area in Costa Rica

The Firestone Reserve is a private, biological and ethnographic protected area in southwestern Costa Rica. The Firestone Reserve is home to the Firestone Center for Restoration Ecology, an undergraduate educational program of Pitzer College in California, USA. The Reserve consists of 60 hectares of mostly secondary forest dissected by several stream canyons with primary forest. The Reserve is part of the Paso de la Dante ("Path of the Tapir") ecosystem project, and contiguous with the Hacienda Baru National Wildlife Refuge.
