= Sherman Fairchild Foundation =

Charitable foundation

The Sherman Fairchild Foundation, founded in 1955, is a charitable foundation of Sherman Fairchild, founder and chairman of the Fairchild Corporations. Sherman Mills Fairchild formed two charitable foundations, the Fairchild Foundation and the Sherman Fairchild Foundation during his lifetime. Upon his death on March 28, 1971, he left the bulk of his estate to his foundations.

In 2019, the Sherman Fairchild Foundation annual giving was $35,861,412 and total assets were over $829 million. It is headquartered in Chevy Chase, MD. Bonnie Burke Himmelman is the current president, Dale T. Knobel is a director. The Foundation grants are primarily to higher education, the fine arts, and cultural institutions. Recipients include Caltech, Dartmouth College, MIT, and Bryn Mawr College.

== Books ==
- Wayne G. Broehl (1995) The Sherman Fairchild Foundation, 1955-1993
