= Brandon Tartikoff =

American television executive (1949–1997)

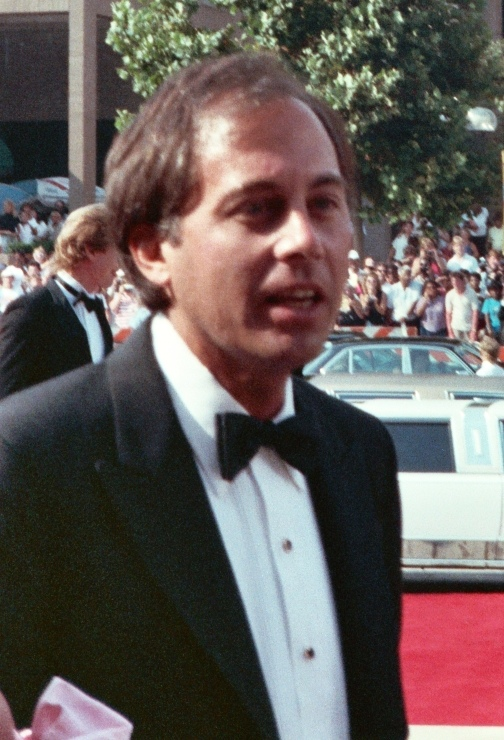
- Tartikoff in 1988
- Born: January 13, 1949; Freeport, New York, U.S.
- Died: August 27, 1997 (aged 48); Los Angeles, California, U.S.
- Education: Yale University; Lawrenceville School
- Occupations: Television network executive; Hollywood studio chairman
- Employers: NBC; Paramount
- Known for: The Cosby Show (1984–1992); V mini series (1983); Seinfeld (1989–1998); Cheers (1982–1993); The Golden Girls (1985–1992); Law & Order (1990–2010); Family Ties (1982–1989); Miami Vice (1984–1989)
- Office: President of NBC Entertainment
- Term: 1981–1991
- Predecessor: Fred Silverman
- Successor: Warren Littlefield
- Spouse: Lilly Samuels (1982–1997, his death)
- Children: 2

Brandon Tartikoff (January 13, 1949 – August 27, 1997) was an American television executive who was head of the entertainment division of NBC from 1981 to 1991. He was credited with turning around NBC's low prime time reputation with several hit series: Hill Street Blues, L.A. Law, Law & Order, ALF, Family Ties, The Cosby Show, Cheers, Seinfeld, The Golden Girls, Wings, Miami Vice, Knight Rider, The A-Team, Saved by the Bell, The Fresh Prince of Bel-Air, St. Elsewhere, Night Court and V.

Tartikoff also helped develop the 1984 sitcom Punky Brewster; he named the title character after a girl he had a crush on in school. He was also involved in the creation of Star Trek: Deep Space Nine and Beggars and Choosers.

== Early life and education ==
Born to a Jewish family in Freeport, New York, Tartikoff was a graduate of Lawrenceville School and Yale University, where he contributed to campus humor magazine The Yale Record.

While attending Yale, Tartikoff worked as an account executive and sales manager for WNHC-TV in New Haven, Connecticut, as well as in Hartford, Connecticut. Tartikoff spent vacations in Los Angeles looking for a job in network television. After graduating from Yale, he took a series of jobs in advertising and local television, including WLS-TV in Chicago, Illinois.

== Career ==
Tartikoff was hired as a program executive at ABC in 1976. One year later, he moved to NBC (after being hired by Dick Ebersol to direct comedy programming). Tartikoff took over programming duties at NBC from Fred Silverman in 1981. At age 32, Tartikoff became the youngest president of NBC's entertainment division.

When Tartikoff took over, NBC was in last place behind ABC and CBS, and the future of the network was in doubt. A writers' strike was looming, affiliates were defecting, mostly to ABC, and the network had only three prime time shows in the Top 20: Little House on the Prairie, Diff'rent Strokes and Real People. Johnny Carson was reportedly in talks to move his landmark late-night talk show to ABC. The entire cast and writers of Saturday Night Live had left that late-night sketch-comedy series, and their replacements had received some of the show's worst critical notices (except for fellow cast members Eddie Murphy and Joe Piscopo who stayed with SNL until 1984). By 1982, Tartikoff and his new superior, the former producer Grant Tinker, began to turn the network's fortunes around.

As head of NBC's Entertainment Division, Tartikoff's successes included The Cosby Show, for which he had pursued Bill Cosby to create a pilot after having been impressed by Cosby's stories when Cosby guest-hosted The Tonight Show. Tartikoff wrote a brainstorming memo that simply read "MTV cops," and later presented the memo to series creator Anthony Yerkovich, formerly a writer and producer for Hill Street Blues. The result was Miami Vice, which became an icon of 1980s pop culture. Knight Rider was inspired by a perceived lack of leading men who could act, with Tartikoff suggesting that a talking car could fill in the gaps in any leading man's acting abilities.

During the casting process of Family Ties, Tartikoff was unexcited about Michael J. Fox for the role of Alex P. Keaton. However, the show's producer, Gary David Goldberg, insisted until Tartikoff relented saying, "Go ahead if you insist. But I'm telling you, this is not the kind of face you'll ever see on a lunch box." Some years later, after the movie Back to the Future cemented Fox's stardom, Fox goodnaturedly sent Tartikoff a lunch box with Fox's picture on it, with a handwritten note reading: "Brandon, They wanted me to put a crow in here, but ... Love and Kisses, Michael J." Tartikoff kept the lunch box on display in his office.

Jerry Seinfeld credited Tartikoff with saving Seinfeld from cancellation during its first four years of struggling ratings. Johnny Carson broke the news of his retirement in February 1991 to Tartikoff at the Grille in Beverly Hills. For several days, only Tartikoff and NBC chairman Bob Wright knew of the planned retirement.

Tartikoff wrote in his memoirs that his biggest professional regret was cancelling the series Buffalo Bill, which he later went on to include in a fantasy "dream schedule" created for a TV Guide article that detailed his idea of "The Greatest Network Ever".

During his time at NBC, he made appearances in several of the network's shows. He was played by David Leisure in "Prime Time," episode five of season two of ALF. In the penultimate scene when ALF suggests a sitcom about a family hosting a lovable alien, he replies "Not in a million years, pal, it's too far-fetched." He hosted Saturday Night Live in 1983 and appeared as himself in an episode of Saved by the Bell, where he briefly entertains the notion of a "show about a high school principal and his kids", before scoffing at the idea. During his 1983 appearance on Saturday Night Live, one skit featured Tartikoff in a black leather ensemble, with the words "Be There" spelled out in rhinestones on the back of his jacket. "Be There" was NBC's slogan during the 1983–84 season. Tartikoff appeared as himself on episodes of Night Court and Night Stand with Dick Dietrick, and in the background of one of the final episodes of Cheers.

On New Year's Day 1991, Tartikoff was involved in a car crash near the family's Lake Tahoe home that injured him and his eight-year-old daughter Calla, who suffered a severe brain injury and received intense therapy in order to walk and speak again.

He left NBC, moving to Paramount Pictures to become its chairman from July 1, 1991. His first film was All I Want for Christmas.

Just over a year later, Tartikoff left that post to spend more time with his recovering daughter in New Orleans. The biggest hit of his reign was Wayne's World. After he left Paramount, he started Moving Target Productions in 1992, and his first work was a joint effort with MCA TV in 1993.

In 1994, he made his comeback to national TV with Last Call, a short-lived late-night discussion show he produced. That same year he also produced The Steven Banks Show for PBS. Later that year, he began a brief run as chairman of New World Entertainment, from 1994 to 1996. Shortly after New World bought out Moving Target Productions, he renamed his production company to MT2 Services (short for Moving Target 2), and instrumental in developing Strange Luck for Fox and Second Noah for ABC. Through MT2 Services, he also developed the failed Marvel TV pilot Generation X for Fox.

Just prior to his death, Tartikoff served as the chairman of the AOL project Entertainment Asylum, for which he teamed with Scott Zakarin to build the world's first interactive broadcast studio. He also continued to do on-air appearances on shows such as Dave's World and Arli$$. In 1996, he left New World Entertainment, following the announcement of its purchase by News Corporation, and then subsequently started H. Beale Company.

== Personal life ==
In 1982, Tartikoff married Lilly Samuels, and the couple had two daughters, Calla Lianne and Elizabeth Justine. Princess Calla on Disney's Adventures of the Gummi Bears was named for Calla Tartikoff.

Tartikoff's parents were survivors of the collision of two 747s in Tenerife, Canary Islands, in 1977.

== Death ==
Tartikoff died on August 27, 1997, at age 48 from Hodgkin lymphoma, a disease with which he had three separate bouts over 25 years. He was interred at Mount Sinai Memorial Park Cemetery in Los Angeles. The Deep Space Nine sixth-season premiere, "A Time to Stand", began with a title card reading "In memory of Brandon Tartikoff." A similar card appeared at the end of the ninth-season premiere of Seinfeld, "The Butter Shave". On August 29, 1997, Dateline NBC ran an extended tribute to Tartikoff that featured many famous figures whose careers he had influenced, including Warren Littlefield, Dick Ebersol, Bill Cosby, Michael J. Fox, Ted Danson, and Jerry Seinfeld.

Tartikoff, through H. Beale Company, posthumously produced the TV pilots Blade Squad in 1998 and the TV show Beggars and Choosers; it aired from 1999 to 2001.

Business positions
Preceded by Fred Silverman	President of NBC; 1981–1991	Succeeded by Warren Littlefield
Preceded by Frank Mancuso Sr.	Chairman of Paramount Pictures; 1991–1992	Succeeded by Sherry Lansing
