= Michael Ceraso =

Presidential campaign manager

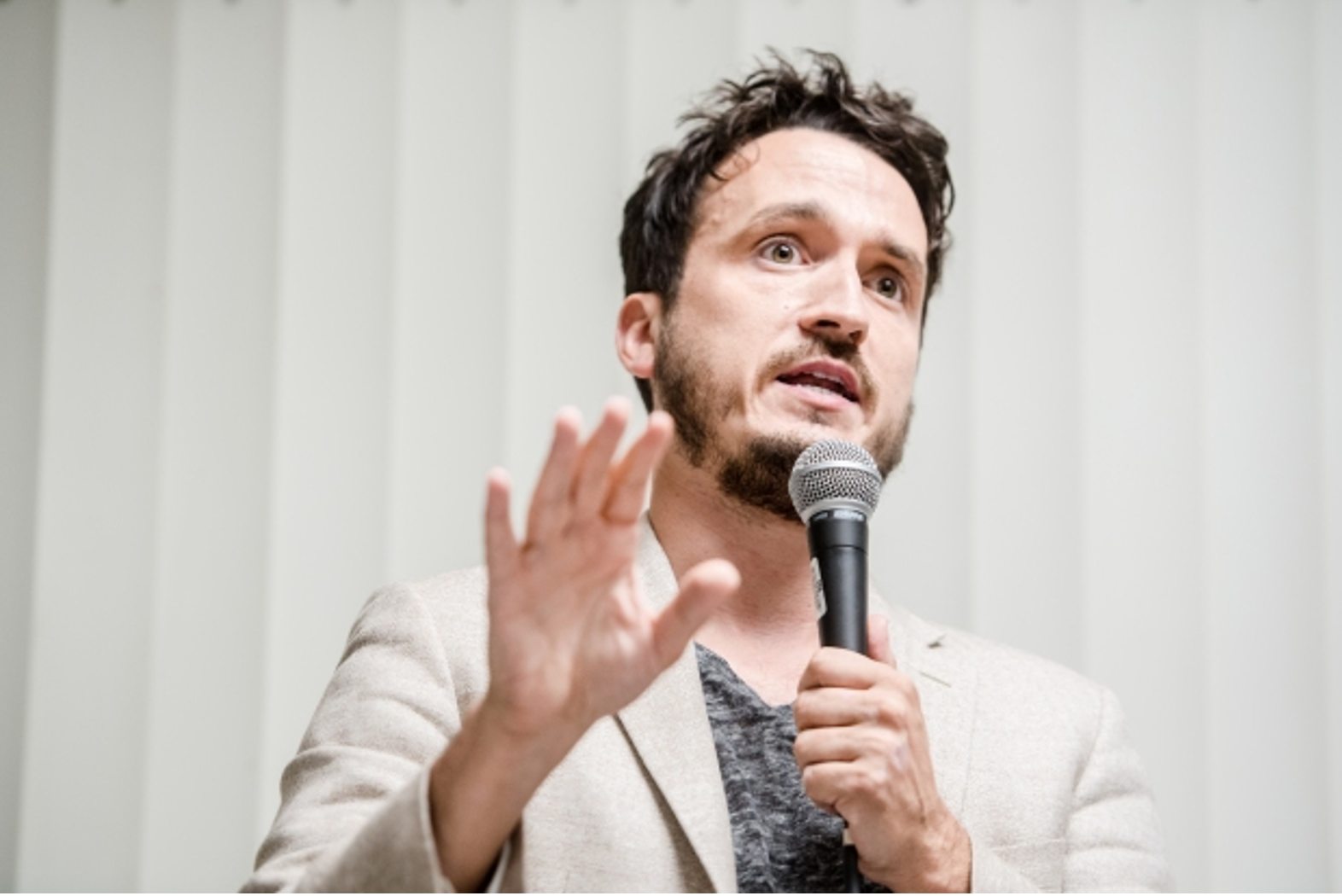
- Education: Pitzer College, BA, 2014
- Occupation: Political consultant
- Organization(s): Winning Margins, Community Groundwork
- Political party: Democratic
- Website: yourwinningmargins.com communitygroundwork.com

Michael Ceraso is an American political strategist affiliated with the Democratic Party.

He was the State Director on Bernie Sanders' 2016 presidential campaign in California and Pete Buttigieg's 2020 presidential campaign in New Hampshire.

He currently leads Winning Margins, a political consulting firm, and Community Groundwork, a nonprofit that trains community college students for political careers.

== Education and early life ==
Ceraso grew up in the suburbs of Los Angeles, where his family struggled with poverty. His mother suffered from bipolar disorder and drug addiction; Ceraso spent time living in foster care and with neighbors.

He earned a two-year degree from Citrus College and a bachelor's in political science and government at Pitzer College. In 2022, he won Pitzer's Young Alumni Achievement Award for his work at Community Groundwork.

In May 2025, Ceraso reflected on his upbringing in West Covina and his experience appearing on the Fox News program Fox & Friends in an alumni feature by Pitzer College. He drew a connection between his upbringing in West Covina—a context of socio-economic hardship—and his development as a political advocate, emphasizing that his early experiences continue to inform his perspective and approach to public commentary and organizing.

== Political career ==
Ceraso worked for Barack Obama's 2008 campaign as a New Mexico field organizer, then served as deputy field director in New Hampshire for the president's 2012 re-election.

He has worked on numerous state and local races, including the 2017 special election of Congressman Jimmy Gomez (D-CA).

He joined Bernie Sanders' 2016 campaign as deputy state director in New Hampshire. After Sanders' decisive victory in the first-in-the-nation primary, Ceraso became the state director for Sanders' operation in California. An Associated Press profile described Ceraso as a "rangy, goateed 34-year-old who, seven months ago, was working as a deputy program director for Airbnb." In May 2016, less than a month before Primary Day, Ceraso was replaced by veteran political operative Robert Becker. Ceraso told the New York Times that the Sanders campaign removed him over a disagreement about campaign strategy. Politico elaborated that the "surprise move came after a period when Ceraso advocated for a California strategy that involved more investment on field and digital organizing than on television advertising — a staple of Sanders' campaign elsewhere." Bernie Sanders went on to lose the primary to Hillary Clinton, 46.04 to 53.07%.

In 2019, Ceraso returned to New Hampshire as State Director for Mayor Pete Buttigieg. In August, the campaign announced that they were “parting ways” with Ceraso and thanked him for his service. Bloomberg noted that Ceraso's departure coincided with a broader reshuffling at the campaign, coming "days after the second round of Democratic debates -- in which Buttigieg had no breakout moments -- and two weeks after the campaign brought on Jess O'Connell as a senior adviser." Buttigieg went on to a narrow second-place finish against Bernie Sanders, with Sanders winning 25.6% and Buttigieg winning 24.3% of the popular vote. After departing from the Buttigieg campaign, Ceraso became a frequent commentator on the state of the 2020 race.

Ceraso has made two unsuccessful runs for Claremont City Council in 2018 and 2020. In 2018, Ceraso earned 9.04% of the vote in a six-way race for three at-large seats. In 2020, he ran for a district seat and received 31.82% of the vote, a second-place finish in a four-way race that went to Silviano “Sal” Medina with 43.62%.

After the 2024 election ended with Kamala Harris's defeat, Ceraso penned op-eds in The Hill about what went wrong and what the Democratic Party should do next. In his first article, Ceraso describes the warning signs he saw in Michigan: an approach to voter outreach that tried to guide voters rather than listening to them, and a resulting lack of organic enthusiasm that the Democrats tried to disguise with celebrity surrogates and paid messengers. "In Flint," he wrote, "I watched... a get-out-the-vote concert. ... The emcee took the mic. 'I’m here for the coin,' he shouted, 'but you need to vote!' I knew instantly we were going to lose." In a subsequent piece, titled "We must not become a party that rejects my best friend," Ceraso discussed how the Democratic purity tests had alienated many voters, including his own loved ones.

In interviews on Fox News, he praised Alexandra Ocasio Cortez for her leadership in the Democratic Party and criticized a Democratic National Committee initiative to improve outreach to young male voters which he saw as hollow. Ceraso criticized the effort as “an issue with the messenger more than the message.” He argued that party strategists were disconnected from day-to-day concerns, saying, “people in suits are hanging out at luxury hotels asking how they can talk to day-to-day Americans.”

== Companies ==
In 2017, Ceraso founded Winning Margins, a five-member political consulting firm that offers communications, strategy, and digital services in media. According to its website, Winning Margins clients include politicians like Linda Serrato, Natalie Murdock, and Michael Blake, and business leaders like Ashley Bell, the leader of the National Black Bank Foundation.

In 2019, Ceraso founded Community Groundwork, a nonprofit startup dedicated to helping community college students get involved in politics. While students at four-year universities build their skills and networks through internship programs, community college students often find the process inaccessible. Community Groundwork started with a $6,000 GoFundMe fundraiser, which covered 22 students at Cerritos and Long Beach community colleges and has grown larger since then. Students begin with a 20-hour course in grassroots politics, including organizing, data, communications, digital skills, and policymaking. It supplements this program with stipends to supplement lost wages and cover expenses, as well as mentorship and shadowing programs that pair community college students with established political professionals.
