= J.Lately =

American rapper

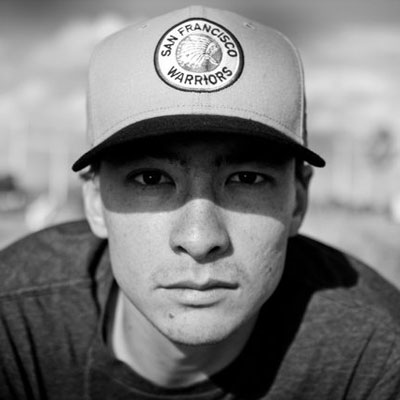

Background information
- Born: January 1987 (age 39); San Francisco, California
- Origin: Sebastopol, California
- Genres: Hip hop; West Coast hip hop; Alternative hip hop; R&B
- Occupation: Rapper
- Years active: 2009–present
- Label: The Unusual Suspects Company
- Website: justlatelymusic.com

J.Lately, born Jeremy Namkung, is an American rapper from Sebastopol, California. He lately entered the hip hop scene in 2009 with his debut mixtape, Straight Outta Somewhere, presented by 2Dopeboyz.com. J.Lately's name comes from the idea that one should continually seek change through growth and progression versus the thought that change is bad and one shouldn't be different than they used to be, so this is him, "Lately."

== Career ==
J.Lately started rapping casually during the middle of his school years at Analy High School where cadence and flow came naturally to him. It wasn't until he went to college where he got deep into hip hop as an artist and began performing shows. Since 2009, he has released mixtapes, solo albums, collaborative works with various West Coast hip hop artists, and singles. Lately's music has been described as a "soulful style and laid back flow" on boom bap beats with a "rare ability to make you contemplate and vibe out simultaneously."

His 2012 solo album Daydreams & Warm Nights, and his 2015 collaborative album with Deuce Eclipse, The Setup, both featured Bay Area legend Zion I. Songs from his Rise & Shine Mixtape (2012), Daydreams & Warm Nights (2012), and Make. Believe. (2014) albums were produced by and featured HBK Gang member Azure. His "Daydreams & Warm Nights" album and his 2015 solo album "Let's Just Be Friends" featured Von Pea of Tanya Morgan from Brooklyn, New York.

In 2015, J.Lately traveled across the country on the Rapture Tour performing alongside Zion I, Locksmith, and Los Rakas. In 2016, J.Lately toured with Locksmith all over the West Coast in the Lock Sessions Tour.

== Personal life ==
J.Lately was born in San Francisco, California and lived in Oakland until the age of 5 when his family moved to Sebastopol, California, where he grew up. His father is Korean and his mother is Canadian. Lately graduated from Pitzer College, one of the Claremont Colleges, as a double major in psychology and organizational studies. After college he moved back to Northern California, splitting his time between Oakland and Sebastopol.

J.Lately's music label, The Unusual Suspects Company, is an independent label through which he releases his music and clothing.

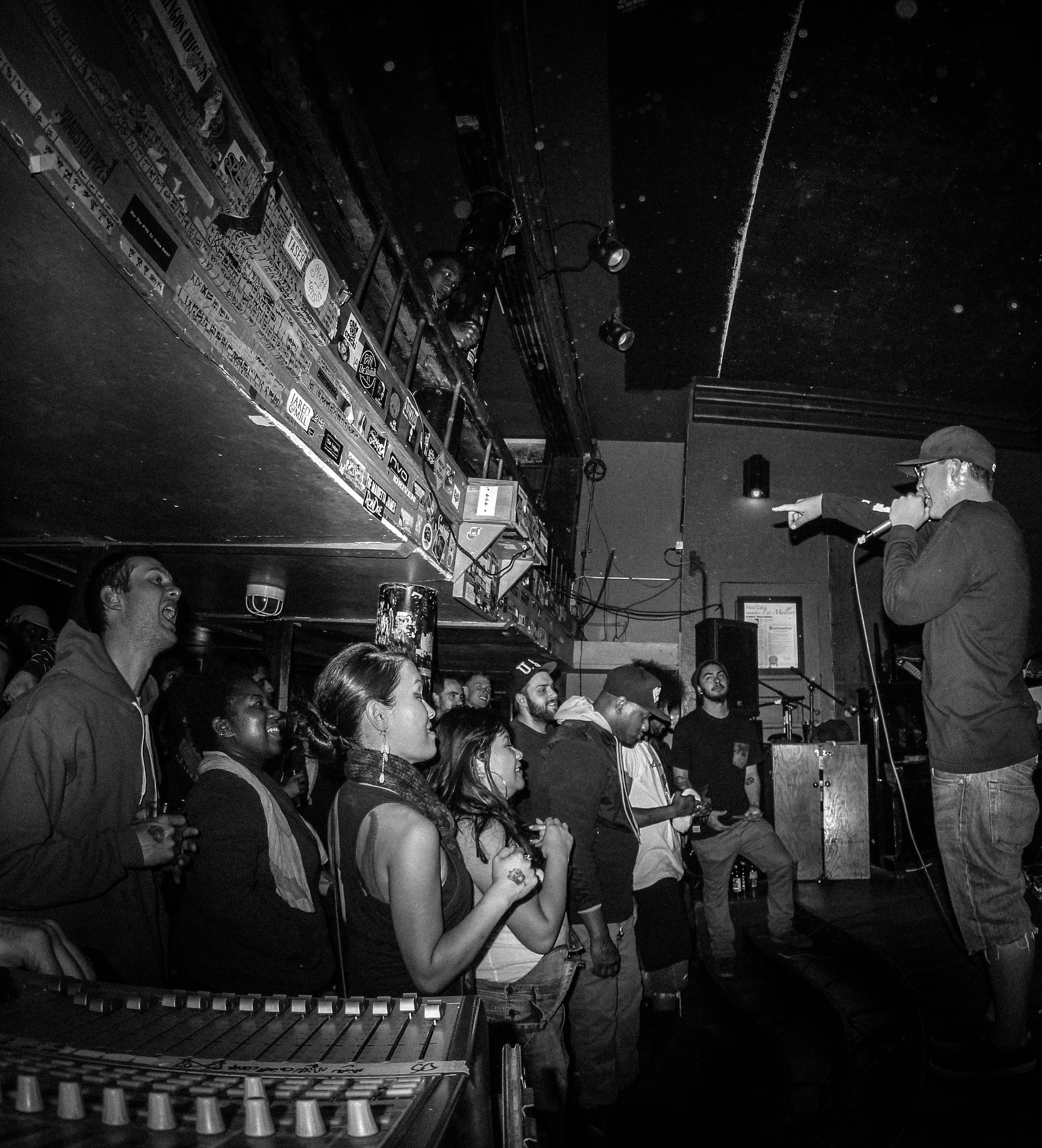
J.Lately at the Stork Club (Oakland, CA)

== Discography ==
- Straight Outta Somewhere (2009)
- El Mañanero (2010)
- Travel Plans EP (2011)
- Rise & Shine Mixtape (2012)
- One Way Ticket with Nima Fadavi (2012)
- Daydreams & Warm Nights (2012)
- Score One for the Good Guys with Trey C (2013)
- PB&Js with J.Good (2013)
- Fly With Us EP with Nima Fadavi (2014)
- Make. Believe. (2014)
- The Setup with Deuce Eclipse (2015)
- Let's Just Be Friends (2015)
- The Good Panda EP (2016)
- Be Fucking Happy (2017)
- Tuesday (2019)
- The Campfire EP (2020)
- Winnebago (2021)
- Bodega (2021)
