= Strom C. Thacker =

Seventh president of Pitzer College

7th President of Pitzer College
- Incumbent
- Assumed office July 1, 2023
- Preceded by: Melvin L. Oliver; Jill A. Klein (interim)

Academic background
- Education: Pomona College (BA); University of North Carolina, Chapel Hill, (MA, PhD)
- Thesis: From silent to active partner: Big business, the state and free trade in Mexico (1996)
- Doctoral advisor: Timothy McKeown

Academic work
- Discipline: Political science
- Institutions: Boston University; Union College

Strom Cronan Thacker is an American political scientist and academic administrator. He took office as the seventh president of Pitzer College in July 2023. As a scholar, his work focuses on the political economy of development in Latin America and other regions of the world.

== Books ==
- Big Business, the State, and Free Trade: Constructing Coalitions in Mexico. Cambridge: Cambridge University Press. 2000. ISBN 9780521781688.
- With Gerring, John (2008). A Centripetal Theory of Democratic Governance. Cambridge: Cambridge University Press. ISBN 9780511756054.
