= Lilly Tartikoff =

American philanthropist

Lilly Tartikoff Karatz
- Born: Lilly Samuels; June 23, 1953 (age 72)
- Education: David Lichine and Irina Kosmovska Ballet School; School of American Ballet
- Occupations: Activist; socialite; restaurateur
- Spouse(s): Brandon Tartikoff (m. 1982–1997); Bruce Karatz (2009–)
- Parents: Jack Samuels (father); Bluma Samuels (mother)

Lilly Tartikoff Karatz (née Samuels; born June 23, 1953, in Los Angeles, California) is an American activist, socialite, restaurateur and fundraiser for breast cancer.

== Early life and marriage ==
Born Lilly Samuels, daughter of Jack and Bluma Samuels, both Holocaust survivors, she attended public school while growing up in Los Angeles and at the age of 10 received a Ford Foundation scholarship to study ballet at the David Lichine and Irina Kosmovska Ballet School. From ages 10 to 17, she danced with the Los Angeles Junior Ballet. When she was 17, she was invited by George Balanchine to attend the School of American Ballet on a Ford Foundation Scholarship. During her nine years at the New York City Ballet, under the direction of Balanchine and Jerome Robbins, she danced in Russia, Germany, Denmark, London, Paris and Washington, D.C.

In 1982, she married Brandon Tartikoff, Chairman of Entertainment for NBC. The couple had two daughters, Calla Lianne and Elizabeth Justine. In 1991, Calla, aged 8, suffered a severe brain injury in a car accident. She received intense therapy in order to walk and speak again, while Brandon received chemotherapy for the third time for Hodgkin's Disease. After a long illness, Brandon died on August 27, 1997, aged 48. In November 2009, she married Bruce Karatz, an American businessman and philanthropist.

== Philanthropic work ==
In 1990, along with Ronald O. Perelman, Chairman and CEO of Revlon, she created the Revlon/UCLA Women's Cancer Research Program under the direction of Dr. Dennis Slamon. The annual Fire & Ice Ball in Hollywood was also established in 1990 to raise funds for this program. These funds led to a new U.S. Food and Drug Administration (FDA) approved drug, Herceptin.

Lifetime Television and Renée Zellweger produced the film Living Proof, which follows the story of Tartikoff and Perelman's project to raise money for Dr. Dennis Slamon's scientific efforts. The film is based on the book HER-2, written by Robert Bazell, which chronicles Slamon's development of Herceptin. The film aired on the Lifetime Channel in October 2008 during Breast Cancer Month.

Tartikoff co-founded the EIF Revlon Run/Walk For Women in Los Angeles with Revlon and the Entertainment Industry Foundation (EIF) in 1993 and the EIF Revlon Run/Walk For Women in New York in 1998. Since then, there has been an EIF Revlon Run/Walk in both Los Angeles and New York every year which continues to raise funds in cancer research. In 1997, she co-created the National Women's Cancer Research Alliance (NWCRA) along with EIF and seven leading scientists from around the nation. In 1998, she created, with EIF and the QVC shopping channel, the international "Cure By The Shore" event. Originally set at the International Cannes Film Festival, the event was hosted in Monte Carlo, Monaco in 2001. She partnered with Katie Couric and EIF to form the National Colorectal Cancer Research Alliance (NCCRA) in March 2000.

In 2001, she launched the United Cancer Front, where Slamon is the organization's Chief Scientific Director. The United Cancer Front is an organization that helps raise funds to accelerate scientific discovery and delivery of breakthrough cancer therapies. In October 2000 in Washington, D.C., she received the Hope Award from the National Coalition for Cancer Survivorship. In 2002, the NCCS created the Lilly Tartikoff Hope Award to honor, remember and celebrate those whose lives have been touched by cancer.

In October 2003, Tartikoff, Yves Carcelle (of Louis Vuitton) and Bob and Suzanne Wright co-chaired the first Annual Louis Vuitton United Cancer Front Gala to raise funds for 35 scientists in cancer therapies. In November 2004, along with Carcelle, the Wrights, Kelly and Ron Meyer (of Universal Studios), and Laura Ziskin, Tartikoff co-chaired the second Annual Louis Vuitton United Cancer Front Gala. She is a board member of the Museum of Contemporary Art. She and her daughter Calla own The Colony Café, a Los Angeles restaurant.

== Awards ==
- 1991 Glamour Woman of the Year Award
- 1992 Norma Zarky Humanitarian Women in Film Award
- 1999 Spirit of Achievement Award presented by the National Women's Division of Albert Einstein College of Medicine
- 2000 National Coalition for Cancer Survivorship 1st Annual Hope Award
- 2000 Glamour Woman of the Year Award
- 2001 Red Book's Mothers & Shakers Award
- 2001 Cedars Sinai Medical Center Golden Scalpel Award for outstanding commitment to curing diseases that afflict the brain.
- 2002 Jefferson Awards S. Roger Horchow Award For Greatest Public Service by a Private Citizen
- 2002 National Coalition for Cancer Survivorship created the Lilly Tartikoff Hope Award to honor, remember and celebrate all whose lives have been touched by cancer.
- 2003 Broadcaster's Foundation Golden Mike Award
- 2006 National Coalition for Cancer Survivorship Ray of Hope Award
