= Edward Burger =

American mathematician

Edward B. Burger

15th President of Southwestern University
- In office 2013–2020
- Preceded by: Jake B. Schrum
- Succeeded by: Laura Skandera Trombley

Personal details
- Born: December 10, 1964 (age 61) Yorktown Heights, New York, U.S.

Academic background
- Education: Connecticut College (BA); University of Texas at Austin (PhD)

Academic work
- Discipline: Number theory
- Institutions: St. David's Foundation; Southwestern University; Williams College; Baylor University

Edward Bruce Burger (born December 10, 1964) is an American mathematician and President Emeritus of Southwestern University in Georgetown, Texas. Previously, he was the Francis Christopher Oakley Third Century Professor of Mathematics at Williams College, and the Robert Foster Cherry Professor for Great Teaching at Baylor University. He also had been named to a single-year-appointment as vice provost of strategic educational initiatives at Baylor University in February 2011. He currently serves as the president and CEO of St. David's Foundation.

Burger has been honored as a leader in education. He has been a keynote speaker, invited special session speaker, or the conference chair at a number of American Mathematical Society, Mathematical Association of America, and the National Council of Teachers of Mathematics conferences.

During the late 1980s Burger was featured at a stand-up comedy club in Austin, Texas and also was an 'independent contractor', writing for Jay Leno. Today he has a weekly program on higher education, thinking, and learning produced by NPR's Austin affiliate KUT called Higher ED.

== Education ==
Burger graduated from Connecticut College in 1985, where he had earned B.A., summa cum laude, with distinction in mathematics. In 1990, he was awarded his Ph.D. in mathematics from the University of Texas at Austin. He did his postdoctoral work at the University of Waterloo in Canada. In 2013 he was awarded an LL.D. from Williams College.

== Career ==
=== Research ===
His research interests include algebraic number theory, Diophantine analysis, p-adic analysis, geometry of numbers, and the theory of continued fractions. He teaches abstract algebra, "The Art of Creating Mathematics", and Diophantine analysis.

=== Teaching ===
He has taught or has been a visiting scholar at The University of Texas at Austin, Westminster College, James Madison University, the University of Colorado at Boulder, Concordia University Texas, Baylor University, and the Macquarie University in Australia.

Burger is a pioneer in rich, multimedia Internet lectures that, together with written material, form an electronic textbook. Together with Thinkwell, Burger "crafted the first-ever virtual, CD-ROM video, interactive, mathematics texts/courses" published over the World Wide Web. Additionally, his lesson tutorial videos earned publisher Holt, Rinehart and Winston one of the 2007 Awards of Excellence from Technology & Learning, an academic publication.

Burger has written and starred in number of educational videos, including the 24-lecture video series Zero to Infinity: A History of Numbers and An Introduction to Number Theory. He has delivered more than 400 lectures worldwide and has appeared on more than 40 radio and TV programs including ABC News Now on WABC-TV in New York and National Public Radio. He starred in the "Mathletes" episode of NBC's "Science of the Winter Olympics" series shown on the Today Show and throughout the 2010 Winter Olympic Games.

In recognition for his work in multimedia education technology, The Association of Educational Publishers awarded Burger with the 2007 Distinguished Achievement Award for Educational Video Technology.

Burger feels that "math trauma" is commonly inflicted upon America's elementary and middle-school students, particularly girls, having received a seventh-grade report card stating: "Eddie is a nice boy, but he'll never do well in math." He offers his students "challenging questions for which the solution is by no means apparent". For example, when teaching students about topology, he asked students if it is "possible to take a cord of rope 6 feet (1.8 m) long and tie it snugly around your right ankle and your left ankle, take off your pants, turn them inside out, and put your pants back on without ever cutting the rope?" He proceeded to demonstrate the solution to that challenge, wearing huge Boston Red Sox boxer shorts under his trousers, at the Boston Public Library in the summer of 2005.

In addition to his math courses, Burger teaches a short course in comedy writing during the winter study program at Williams. Combining math with comedy comes from his days as a stand-up comic at the Laff Stop Comedy Club in Austin in the late-1980s.

=== Publications ===
Burger has written 12 books and has had 37 papers published in scholarly journals. With Michael Starbird, he coauthored The Heart of Mathematics: An invitation to effective thinking, for which they won a 2001 Robert W. Hamilton Book Award, and Coincidences, Chaos, and All That Math Jazz,, a humorous look at mathematics filed under both math and humor in the Library of Congress catalog. Burger is also an associate editor for the American Mathematical Monthly and a member of the editorial board for [AK Peters Publishing].

Some of the books and papers he has authored or co-authored include:

- "Badly Approximable Systems and Inhomogeneous Approximation Over Number Fields" at Google Books, 1993
- "Pleasures vs. Problems", February 2000
- Exploring the Number Jungle: A Journey into Diophantine Analysis (Student Mathematical Library, V. 8), ISBN 0-8218-2640-9, July 2000
- "'Math Forum'—I couldn't keep my distance: A mathematical seduction, February 2002
- The Joy of Thinking: The Beauty and Power of Classical Mathematical Ideas: Part 1 & 2 (The Great Courses – Science & Mathematics), ASIN B000KHB84U (2003)
- Making Transcendence Transparent: An intuitive approach to classical transcendental number theory, ISBN 0-387-21444-5, July 2004
- The Heart of Mathematics: An Invitation to Effective Thinking at Google Books, ISBN 1-931914-41-9, 2004
- Coincidences, Chaos, and All That Math Jazz: Making Light of Weighty Ideas, ISBN 0-393-05945-6, August 2005
- Matematicas, ISBN 0-03-092628-9, 2007
- Mathematics: Course 2, Holt, ISBN 0-03-038512-1, January 2007
- Algebra 1, Holt, ISBN 0-03-035827-2, January 2007
- Extending the Frontiers of Mathematics: Inquiries into proof and argumentation, ISBN 1-59757-042-7, March 2007
- Algebra 2, Holt, ISBN 0-03-035829-9, August 2007
- The 5 Elements of Effective Thinking, (with Michael Starbird) published by Princeton University Press in September 2012, ISBN 978-0-691-15666-8

Additionally, Burger has created virtual video textbooks on CD-ROM and on the web for Thinkwell on the topics of "College Algebra", 2000; "Pre-Calculus", 2000; "Calculus", 2001; "Intermediate Algebra", 2001; "Beginning Algebra", 2004; "Trigonometry", 2006; "Prealgebra", 2007; and "Algebra II", 2011.

=== Professional positions ===
Burger has held the following professional positions:

University of Texas at Austin
Visiting lecturer, Summer 1990; Visiting Assistant Professor, Fall 1994; Visiting Scholar, Summer 1997
University of Waterloo, Canada
Postdoctoral fellow, 1990–1991
Williams College
Assistant professor, 1990–1996; associate professor, 1997–2000; professor of mathematics, 2001–2013; chair of the Department of Mathematics and Statistics, 2003–2006; Gaudino Scholar, 2008–2010; Lissack Professor for Social Responsibility and Personal Ethics, 2010–2012; Francis Christopher Oakley Third Century Professor of Mathematics, 2012–2013
James Madison University; Macquarie University, Australia
Visiting fellow, summer 1999
Westminster College
Genevieve W. Gore Distinguished Resident, March 2001
Mass Interaction
Mathematics consultant, summer 2001
Texas Christian University
Cecil and Ida Green Honors Professor, fall 2001
American Mathematical Monthly
Associate editor, 2002–present
The Educational Advancement Foundation
Member of the board of trustees, 2004–2008
AK Peters Publishing
Member of the editorial board, 2005–present
NUMB3RS in the Classroom Project, CBS-TV/Paramount Studios/Texas Instruments
Mathematics advisor, 2005–2007
The Thomas S. Kenan Institute for the Arts at the University of North Carolina School of the Arts
Member of the board, 2009–present
Baylor University
Robert Foster Cherry Professor for Great Teaching, 2010–2012
Vice provost for strategic educational initiatives, 2011–2012
Southwestern University
15th president, 2013–2020
St. David's Foundation
President and CEO

== Selected honors and awards ==
Some of the honors and awards Burger has received include:

- 2014 Elected to The Philosophical Society of Texas.
- 2013 Awarded an Honorary Degree (Doctor of Laws) from Williams College.
- 2013 Fellow of the American Mathematical Society.
- 2012 "Global Hero in Education", Named by Microsoft Corporation
- 2010 Telly Award, for the "Mathletes" episode of the NBC-Universal television series "The Science of the Olympic Winter Games" (the entire series won a 2011 Emmy Award)
- 2010 Game Changer, Named by The Huffington Post; "HuffPost's Game Changers salutes 100 innovators, visionaries, mavericks, and leaders who are reshaping their fields and changing the world."
- 2010 Robert Foster Cherry Award for Great Teaching from Baylor University
- 2007 Award of Excellence, for "educational mathematics videos that break new ground", Technology & Learning magazine
- 2007 Distinguished Achievement Award, for Educational Video Technology, The Association of Educational Publishers
- 2006 "100 Best of America", Listed in Reader's Digest Annual Special Issue as Best Math Teacher
- 2006 Lester R. Ford Award for the expository article A Tail of Two Palindromes
- 2003 Residence Life Academic Teaching Award, University of Colorado at Boulder
- 2001 Robert W. Hamilton Book Award, for "The Heart of Mathematics"
- 1988 Mathematics Teaching Award, The University of Texas at Austin

Burger is the Francis Christopher Oakley Third Century Professor of Mathematics and was the Lissack Professor for Social Responsibility and Personal Ethics (2010–2012) and the Gaudino Scholar (2008–2010) at Williams College, where he was also awarded the 2007 Nelson Bushnell Prize for Scholarship and Teaching.

Burger has been honored by The Mathematical Association of America on several occasions: 2001, Deborah and Franklin Haimo Award for Distinguished College or University Teaching of Mathematics; 2001–2003, George Pólya lecturer; 2004, Chauvenet Prize; and 2006, Lester R. Ford Award

== See also ==
- List of University of Waterloo people
