= Sandra Mitchell =

American historian and philosopher

Sandra D. Mitchell (born 1951) is an American philosopher of science and historian of ideas. She holds the position of distinguished professor in the department of History and Philosophy of Science at the University of Pittsburgh, the top rated school in the world for the subject according to the 2011 Philosophical Gourmet Report. Her research focuses on the philosophy of biology and the philosophy of social science, and connections between the two.

== Biography ==
Sandra D. Mitchell worked at the Ohio State University (1985–1989) and University of California, San Diego (1989–1999), before joining the Department of History and Philosophy of Science in 2000. She has been a fellow at the Center for Interdisciplinary Studies, at the University of Bielefeld (1991–1992), the Max Planck Institute for the Study of Societies in Cologne (2004–2005), the Institute for Advanced Study, Berlin (1993–1994), and the Max Planck Institute for the History of Science (2010).

Mitchell received a B.A. in philosophy from Pitzer College (1973), a M.Sc. in Logic, Philosophy and Scientific Method from the London School of Economics (1975), and a Ph.D. in History and Philosophy of Science from the University of Pittsburgh (1987).

In her more recent articles, she has argued that the search for a unified, reductionist Theory of Everything is futile. Instead, she suggests that the sciences focus on studying the complex correlations between elements and their emergent effects (self-organization) that, as she argues, a strictly reductionist approach is not able to adequately address.

== Bibliography ==
- 1997 (edited with Peter Weingart, Peter Richerson, Sabine Maasen): Human by Nature: Between Biology and the Social Sciences, Mahwah, New Jersey: Lawrence Erlbaum Associates. ISBN 978-0-8058-2154-3
- 2002 (edited with John Earman, Clark Glymour): Ceteris Paribus Laws. Dordrecht, Netherlands: Kluwer. ISBN 978-1-4020-1020-0
- 2003: Biological Complexity and Integrative Pluralism, Cambridge: Cambridge University Press. ISBN 978-0-521-81753-0
- 2008: Komplexitäten: Warum wir erst anfangen, die Welt zu verstehen, Frankfurt: Suhrkamp, ISBN 978-3-518-26001-2
- 2009: Unsimple Truths: Science, Complexity and Policy, Chicago: University of Chicago Press, ISBN 978-0-226-53265-3

== See also ==
- American philosophy
- List of American philosophers
