= Adam S. Weinberg =

American sociologist and academic administrator

Adam Weinberg

20th President of Denison University
- Incumbent
- Assumed office July 1, 2013
- Preceded by: Dale T. Knobel

Personal details
- Born: Adam Stein Weinberg; January 12, 1965 (age 61) St. Louis, Missouri, U.S.
- Education: Bowdoin College (BA); Northwestern University (MA, PhD)
- Profession: College President
- Website: Official website

Adam Stein Weinberg (born January 12, 1965) is an American sociologist, academic administrator, and the 20th and current president of Denison University. Previously, he was the president and CEO of World Learning and vice president and dean of the college at Colgate University.

== Early life ==
Adam Stein Weinberg was born in St. Louis, Missouri, on January 12, 1965. He is the son of Penny (Klamon) and Dr. Warren Abraham Weinberg, who was a pediatric neurologist, faculty member, and medical researcher at the University of Texas Southwestern Medical School. His family is Jewish. He grew up in St. Louis and Dallas, Texas. He played ice hockey as a student athlete. Weinberg is a graduate of Deerfield Academy and Bowdoin College, class of 1987. He also studied at Cambridge University as a Keasbey scholar before earning both master's and Ph.D. degrees in sociology at Northwestern University. He worked on Capitol Hill in Washington, DC, before pursuing graduate studies at Northwestern University. Weinberg is the brother of Ellen Weinberg-Hughes, a former women's ice hockey player and member of US women's national team at the 1992 Women's World Championship. He is the uncle of NHL players Quinn, Jack, and Luke Hughes.

== Career ==
=== Colgate University ===
In 1995 Weinberg joined the faculty at Colgate University as an assistant professor in the sociology and anthropology department, eventually becoming an associate professor. From 2002 to 2005 he served as vice president and Dean of the college. He was a founding director of Partnership for Community Development, focused on economic development and quality of life issues in the town and village of Hamilton and helped found the university's Center for Outreach, Volunteerism and Education. He was named a Phi Eta Sigma Professor of the Year and was honored with a Maroon Citation by the Colgate Alumni Corporation.

=== World Learning ===
From 2006 to 2009 Weinberg served as the provost and executive vice president of World Learning. From 2009 to 2013, he served as the organization's president and CEO. Founded in 1932, World Learning is an international nonprofit organization based in Brattleboro, Vermont, that focuses on international development, education, and exchange programs.

=== Denison University ===
On July 1, 2013, Weinberg became the 20th President of Denison University. During his tenure as the university's president, there has been significant expansion of the curriculum with new generation academic programs, global programs, and a deepening of the arts, including the construction of the Michael D. Eisner Center for the Performing Arts; a reinvention of career exploration with the launching of the Austin E. Knowlton Center for Career Exploration; and a campus-wide focus on mentorship as a defining feature of a liberal arts education.

== Affiliations and awards ==
Weinberg is a member of the Council on Foreign Relations’s Higher Education Working Group on Global Issues and the Talloires Network. Also, Weinberg is a member of the Columbus Partnership, that works to promote economic development in the Columbus, Ohio region. and the Council on Competitiveness. Weinberg has sat on many boards including The Midland Theatre, The Works, I Know I Can, The Great Lakes College Association, and The Ohio Foundation for Independent Colleges. While at World Learning, he was on the boards of InterAction and The Alliance of International and Cultural Exchange. He is the founding member of the Boys & Girls Club of Newark (Ohio), and he is a co-founding member of Democracy Matters.

In 2017, Weinberg received the Career Services Champion Award from the National Association of Colleges and Employers.

In 2022, Weinberg was awarded the Deerfield Academy Heritage Award in recognition of outstanding alumni.

== Selected works ==
- Nine essential practices to make college pay off, (Kiplinger, November 4, 2019)
- The move to stakeholder capitalism is an opportunity to reshape education, (The Boston Globe, September 5, 2019)
- Creating an Ecosystem of Faculty Mentorship (Inside Higher Ed, February 25, 2019)
- Educational and Cultural Exchanges to Restore America’s Image, (The Washington Quarterly, Summer 2008)
- Globalizing the Liberal Arts, July 24, 2018
- The Civic Responsibilities of Colleges, (HuffPost, December 6, 2017)
- Higher Education, Columbus and the Future of Jobs, (Columbus Dispatch, February 1, 2019)
- Being a Civically Engaged Campus that Contributes to Democratic Ways of Life, (Connections: Annual Journal of the Kettering Foundation, 2017).
- Urban Recycling and the Search for Sustainable Community Development (Princeton University Press, 2000) ISBN 978-0-6910-5014-0 (with David Pellow and Allan Schnaiberg)
- Local Environmental Struggles: Citizen Activism in the Treadmill of Production (Cambridge University Press, 1996) ISBN 0521555213
