= Matthew Karatz =

American journalist

- Born: 1971 (age 54–55)
- Occupations: Real estate developer, journalist
- Known for: Deputy Mayor of Los Angeles
- Children: 3
- Parent(s): Bruce Karatz; Janet Dreisen

Matthew Karatz is an American journalist, businessman, and politician. He has served as head of the Mayor's Office of Economic and Business Policy and has been noted for his previous role as a Los Angeles deputy mayor. Karatz has served as senior director in land acquisition at KB Home and as the vice president of acquisitions and development at Caruso Affiliated.

Prior to working in public service and the real estate industry, Karatz worked for ABC News and earned a News & Documentary Emmy Award for his work in investigative journalism.

== Early life and education ==
Matthew Karatz is the son of former KB Home chairman and CEO, Bruce Karatz and his first wife Janet Dreisen. In 1990, he graduated from Gould Academy, a college preparatory school. In 1994, he earned a Bachelor's degree in political science from Pitzer College.

== Career ==
=== Real estate ===
Karatz is managing partner at MDK Angelo Holdings, LLC, a private real estate and investment company based in Los Angeles. Karatz worked in the commercial real estate industry as the real estate portfolio manager for Avondale Investments, and as Vice President of Development and Acquisition at Caruso Affiliated. In addition, Karatz held several positions at KB Home's businesses in southern California, and served as the company's senior director of land acquisitions.

=== Journalism ===
Karatz worked as an investigative reporter for ABC News, with chief investigative correspondent Brian Ross, and Peter Jennings. He received a News & Documentary Emmy Award during his tenure.

=== Politics ===
In 2011, Karatz was appointed as deputy mayor by Los Angeles Mayor Antonio Villaraigosa, and served as the mayor's senior advisor on economic and business matters. He succeeded former mayoral candidate and current publisher and CEO of Los Angeles Times, Austin Beutner. Karatz supervised thirteen city departments including: Department of Building and Safety, Department of City Planning, the Los Angeles Convention Center, Los Angeles Tourism, Department of Water and Power, international trade, LAX and economic development initiatives related to the Port of Los Angeles. In February 2013, Karatz resigned his post as deputy mayor and stated his plans to return to the private sector.

=== Rubicon Project ===
In 2013, Karatz joined the Rubicon Project as chief of staff and head of strategic operations.

== Personal life ==
Karatz is married to Lindsey Edelman; they have three children. He and his wife are members of the Wilshire Boulevard Temple.
