= Pitzer College =

Private college in Claremont, California, US

- Motto: Provida Futuri
- Motto in English: Mindful of the Future
- Type: Private liberal arts college
- Established: 1963; 63 years ago
- Endowment: $191.8 million (2024)
- President: Strom C. Thacker
- Faculty: 105
- Undergraduates: 1,191
- Location: Claremont, California, United States; 34°6′14″N 117°42′20″W
- Campus: Suburban, 35 acres (14 ha)
- Colors: Orange and white
- Mascot: Cecil the Sagehen
- Website: www.pitzer.edu

Pitzer College is a private liberal arts college in Claremont, California. It was founded in 1963 as a women's college in the Claremont Colleges consortium and became coeducational in 1970.

Pitzer enrolls approximately 1000 students. Pitzer offers 41 majors and 22 minors, many of them cross-disciplinary. The college has a curricular emphasis on the social sciences, behavioral sciences, international programs, and media studies. Pitzer is known for its social justice culture and experimental pedagogical approach.

Pitzer competes in the NCAA Division III's Southern California Intercollegiate Athletic Conference (SCIAC) in a joint athletic program with Pomona College (another consortium member) as the Pomona-Pitzer Sagehens. Notable alumni include federal officials, authors, and various figures in the entertainment industry. Pitzer is a top producer of Fulbright US Student Program awardees.

== History ==
Pitzer was made the sixth institution of the Claremont Colleges when it was founded in 1963 as a women's college by Russell K. Pitzer (1878–1978), a California citrus magnate, philanthropist, and Pomona College alumnus. In April 1963, John W. Atherton, the dean of faculty and a professor of English at Claremont Men's College (now Claremont McKenna College) was hired as Pitzer's first president, and over the next seventeen months he recruited students, faculty, and trustees and constructed Scott and Sanborn Halls just in time for the fall 1964 semester. During the college's first year, students and faculty created the curriculum and the school's system of governance. The college graduated its first class of students in 1965 and became co-educational in the fall of 1970. The first academic term in the fall of 1964 began with eleven professors and 153 students from sixteen states and five countries. Pitzer's sixth president, Melvin L. Oliver, was the first African American to lead any of the five Claremont Colleges.

=== Presidents ===
- John W. Atherton (1963–1970)
- Robert H. Atwell (1970–1978)
- Frank L. Ellsworth (1979–1991)
- Marilyn Chapin Massey (1992–2002)
- Laura Skandera Trombley (2002–2015)
- Thomas Poon (2015–2016, acting and interim)
- Melvin L. Oliver (2016–2022)
- Jill A. Klein (2022–2023, interim)
- Strom C. Thacker (2023–present)

== Campus ==
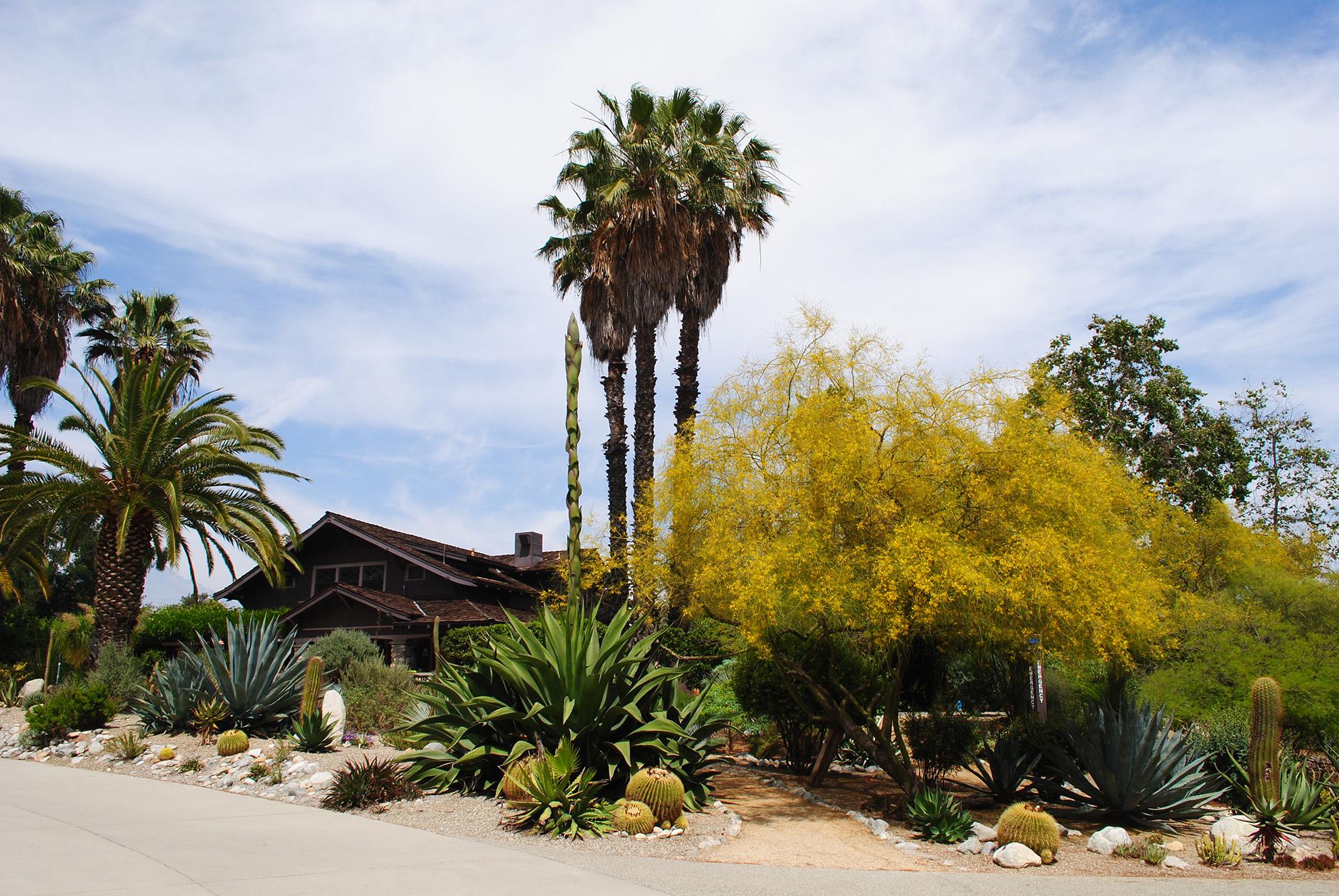
The Rodman Arboretum surrounds the Grove House at Pitzer College.

Pitzer's campus is in Claremont, California, covering an area of approximately 35 acres (14 ha). The campus is located approximately 10 mi (16 km) west of LA/Ontario International Airport and Los Angeles can be accessed via Metrolink. Access to campus is also provided via Interstate 10 and Interstate 210. The campus comprises sixteen buildings, including five residence halls. West and East Halls earned Platinum LEED certification when they opened 2012.

The Pitzer College campus occupies the northeast corner of the Claremont Colleges property, which contains seven institutions of higher education coordinated through the Claremont University Consortium. The Claremont Colleges comprise Pomona College (founded in 1887), Claremont Graduate University (1925), Scripps College (1926), Claremont McKenna College (1946), Harvey Mudd College (1955), Pitzer College (1963), and Keck Graduate Institute of Applied Life Sciences (1997). At present, the campus is split approximately in half by Pitzer Road. Harvey Mudd College is adjacent to Pitzer's north, Scripps to the west, and Claremont McKenna to the south.

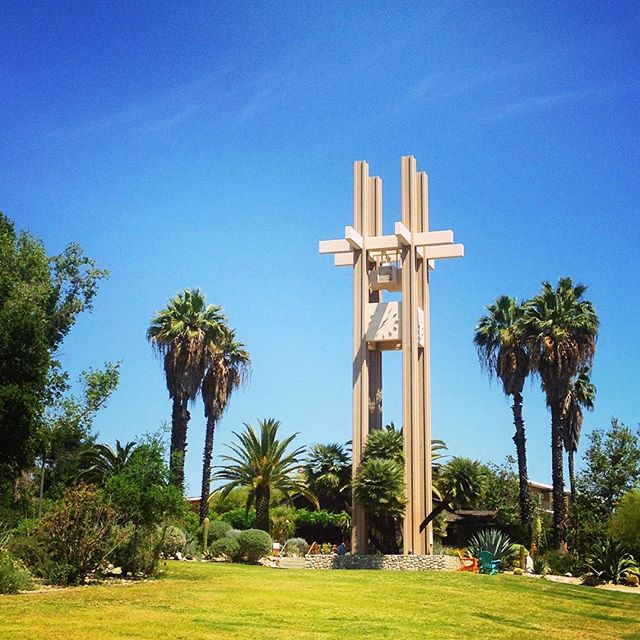
Brant Clock Tower

Contemporary architecture characterizes the majority of Pitzer's buildings, several of which were designed by Gwathmey-Siegel following major donations from Eli Broad, a board member emeritus and former chair of the Pitzer College Board of Trustees. A notable exception is the Grove House, a California bungalow built in 1902 for a local citrus grower during the height of the Arts and Crafts movement. The building, a popular campus hangout to this day, was purchased for $1.00 and moved to Pitzer in 1977 under the direction of professor emeritus Barry Sanders. The Grove House is home to a cafe, the Women's Center, the Hinshaw Gallery and the EcoCenter.

Most landscaping on the campus follows principles of xeriscaping. Several varieties of citrus and other fruit are grown throughout campus and an organic community garden, dedicated grove and chicken coop are located north of Mead Hall. The 10-acre John R. Rodman Arboretum, an attempt to save surviving native chaparral vegetation from demolition, was founded in 1984. It contains 16 themed gardens with drought-tolerant, native landscaping.

The campus also includes auditoriums, sports courts, and science buildings.

Located directly northwest of the main campus, the Robert J. Bernard Biological Field Station, a resource of The Claremont Colleges, is an 86-acre (35 ha) nature preserve consisting of coastal sage scrub.

The Outback Preserve, located in the northeast section of campus, occupies just over three acres of the John Rodman Arboretum. The preserve is home to one of the rarest ecosystems in the world: Alluvial Sage Scrub. Undergoing ecological restoration as part of the Outback Restoration Project, the preserve is a living-learning laboratory. The project seeks to restore the Outback Preserve to a more intact alluvial sage scrub ecosystem, removing invasive plants and ensuring the success of native species. Each semester there are a small number of courses utilizing the Outback Preserve. Courses are open to all students at the Claremont Colleges.

Pitzer owns and operates a 145-acre (59 ha) field station on secondary growth rainforest, the Firestone Center for Restoration Ecology. The facility is located approximately two kilometers east of Playa Dominical, Costa Rica. The property borders the Hacienda Barú nature reserve. The center is home to programs in Pitzer's science, language and international studies curricula.

== Rankings ==
Academic rankings

Liberal arts
- U.S. News & World Report: 36
- Washington Monthly: 52

National
- Forbes: 54
- WSJ/College Pulse: 77

The U.S. News & World Report College and University rankings 2025 edition ranked Pitzer College as tied for the 36th best national liberal arts college overall and tied for 54th in "Top Performers on Social Mobility" out of 211 evaluated liberal arts colleges.

In Forbes' 2019 college rankings, Pitzer was named 54th best among the 650 top-ranked colleges, universities and, service academies in the U.S. In addition, Pitzer was named the 44th best private college, the 22nd best liberal arts college, and the 11th best college in the West.

== Academics ==
As a member of the Claremont College Consortium, Pitzer students have access to nearly all facilities available to students enrolled at the other colleges, in addition to all facilities administered by the Claremont College Consortium. Any student attending Pitzer can enroll in classes at the other four colleges, and can complete an off-campus major if the major is not offered by Pitzer.

Pitzer offers 41 majors and 22 minors, many of them cross-disciplinary, and each student is assigned a faculty advisor upon their arrival on campus. The college expects students to take an active part in planning their course of study and has few distribution requirements. The most popular majors, based on 2021 graduates were:

- Research and Experimental Psychology (22)
- Environmental Science (20)
- Organizational Behavior Studies (18)
- Political Science and Government, General (18)
- Economics (17)

The student/faculty ratio is 10:1, and 100% of Pitzer's tenure-track faculty hold a Ph.D. or the terminal degree in their field.

The college operates 58 study abroad programs, including 41 international exchanges and 6 domestic exchanges. Pitzer College also operates its own study abroad programs in Brazil, Costa Rica, Ecuador, Italy, Nepal, Tanzania/South Africa/Zimbabwe, and Vietnam.

In 2021, Pitzer was ranked as a top producer of Fulbright US Student Program awardees for 13 consecutive years and one of the nine baccalaureate institutes who had been top producers of Fulbright US students every year for at least the past decade.

== Admission ==
Enrolled fall freshman statistics
	2023	2019	2018	2017	2016	2015
Applicants	4,415	4,358	3,753	4,142	4,149	
Admits	605	581	608	569	559	
Admit rate	13.7%	13.3%	16.2%	13.7%	13.5%	
Enrolled	276	273	262	268	267	
Yield rate	45.6%	47.0%	43.1%	47.1%	47.8%	
SAT range	1350–1460	1340–1490	1310–1490	1300–1450	1250–1440	
ACT range	30–33	30–33	29–32	29–32	29–32	

Nearly two decades after becoming the first college on the West Coast to adopt an SAT-optional admission policy, Pitzer College switched to a test-free admission policy for at least three years, beginning with the admission cycle for fall 2022. Admission to Pitzer College is rated as "most selective" by U.S. News & World Report. For the Class of 2027, Pitzer College accepted 15.9% of applicants (enrolling fall 2023) with an average high school GPA of 4.07. Of the 32% of enrolled freshmen submitting SAT scores, the middle 50% range was 1370–1460 for the composite score, 668–730 for evidence-based reading and writing, and 680–750 for math, while of the 28% of enrolled freshmen submitting ACT results, the middle 50% range for the composite score was 30–33.

== Student body ==
Pitzer College enrolls approximately 1000 students, making it the third largest of the five undergraduate Claremont Colleges (Claremont McKenna and Pomona have larger student bodies, while Harvey Mudd and Scripps are smaller). Pitzer College ranks 25th nationwide among all Baccalaureate Colleges for percentage of its students who study abroad, and Pitzer has the highest rate of students who study abroad among the Claremont Colleges. Students of color constitute over 49.6% of the total student body and Pitzer enrolls 10% international students, the third largest among the Claremont Consortium behind Pomona College (12%) and Claremont Mckenna College (16%).

=== Community involvement ===
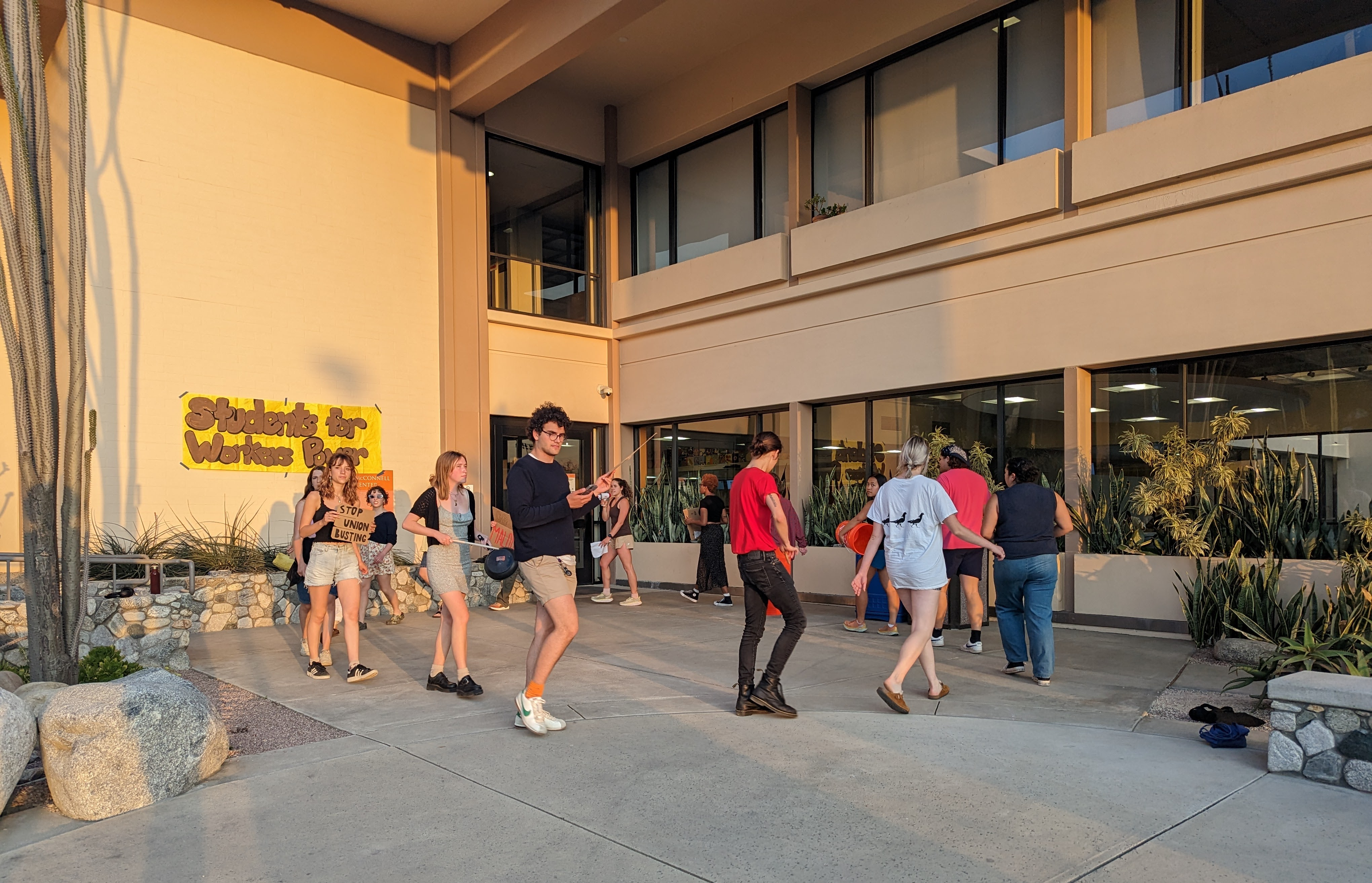
Pitzer students protest the firing of three dining hall workers for supporting union organizing.

The Pitzer College community is known for its involvement outside of the classroom. Its students, faculty, and staff donate over 100,000 hours to community service annually. The college has been named to the President's Higher Education Community Service Honor Roll seven times.

Much of Pitzer's community engagement occurs in the Community Engagement Center (CEC). The CEC runs the Pitzer in Ontario Program, a comprehensive semester-long service learning and cultural immersion program with a strong theoretical foundation in the human sciences informed by the best practices in the field of experiential education. The program integrates extensive internship experiences in city, private or non-profit organizations with interdisciplinary coursework that provides the theoretical framework from which social and urban issues can be evaluated.

At the Campus Compact 20/20 Visioning Summit on October 17, 2006, the Corporation for National and Community Service recognized Pitzer as one of 28 California campuses distinguished for community service and Hurricane Katrina relief efforts. Pitzer College received Mother Jones Magazine 2006 Campus Activism for Thinking Outside of the Box.

Pitzer College students including former Speaker of the California State Assembly Fabian Nunez '97 helped in founding the Pomona Economic Opportunity Center. Through the Community Engagement Center, dozens of Pitzer students volunteer each semester with programs at Camp Afflerbaugh, Azuza School District, and California Youth Authority Chino.

=== Events and traditions ===
Kohoutek Music and Arts Festival began in 1974 and is a student-run multi-day outdoor music and arts festival held each spring on the Pitzer campus. The event, which is free and open to all Claremont Colleges community members, is named after Comet Kohoutek. The festival generally includes student vendors, fire performances, a farmers market, and other activities.

Orientation Adventure is the pre-Welcome Week program for incoming students. Usually, students go on an outdoor adventure trip or can opt for a city based adventure.

Murals on the interiors and exteriors of campus buildings provide unique visual atmosphere to Pitzer college.

Snackie Snack is a free late-night snack served by the Pitzer Activities (PAct) Programming Board. During exam periods, Snackie Snack is served by the president and members of the cabinet.

Reggae Fest began in 2003 as a fall concert event. The festival runs over the course of a single day and features professional bands, free food, and beverages. In 2016, the Pitzer College Student Senate suspended funding for the event amid concerns that it was culturally appropriative and disrespectful toward Jamaican culture.

== Student life ==
=== Club and intramural sports ===
The school also has many options for intramural sports ranging from basketball, flag football, soccer to even pickleball.

=== Gold Student Health and Wellness Center ===
Originally opened in 1995, the Gold Student Health and Wellness Center was renovated and reopened in 2014.

=== Residential Life Project ===
The Residential Life Project is expected to be completed in three phases over the next 10 to 15 years. Phase I, which included Sanborn, Pitzer, and Atherton Halls, was completed and inaugurated in September 2007 and received LEED Gold recognition from the United States Green Building Council in 2008. Robert Redford and Ed Begley Jr. were the keynote speakers at the dedication ceremony of the Residential Life Project. Phase II, which incorporates four new residence halls, a demonstration kitchen, an archive, a board room and program/faculty offices, was completed in 2012 and earned LEED platinum certification.

When Pitzer's Residential Life Project is complete, the college expects to become the first college in the nation to have all Gold or Platinum LEED certified residence halls.

=== Student clubs and organizations ===
Pitzer has more than 50 student clubs and organizations on campus, in addition to over 200 others within the Claremont Colleges consortium.

== Athletics ==
Varsity teams
Women's	Men's
Basketball	Baseball
Cross country	Basketball
Golf	Cross country
Lacrosse	Football
Soccer	Golf
Softball	Soccer
Swimming and diving	Swimming and diving
Tennis	Tennis
Track and field	Track and field
Volleyball	Water polo
Water polo	

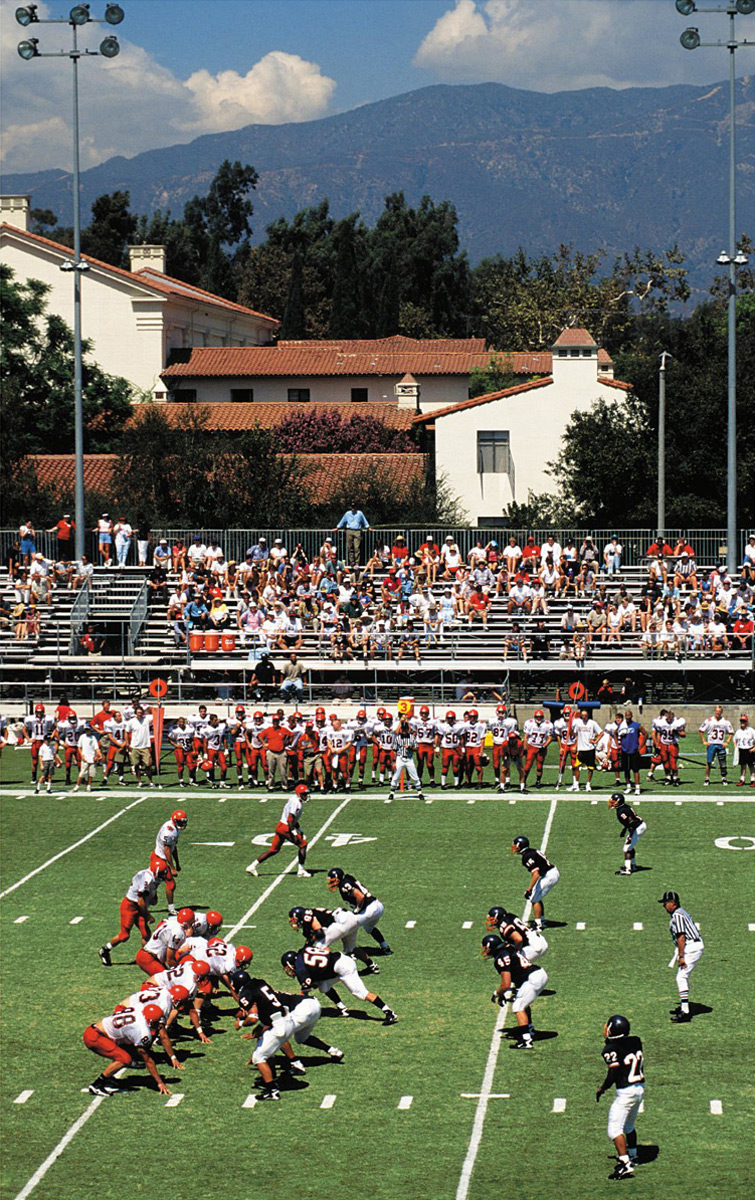
A Pomona-Pitzer football game

Pitzer's varsity athletics teams compete jointly with Pomona College (another consortium member) as the Pomona-Pitzer Sagehens. The 11 women's and 10 men's teams participate in NCAA Division III in the Southern California Intercollegiate Athletic Conference (SCIAC). Pomona-Pitzer's mascot is Cecil the Sagehen, a greater sage-grouse, and its colors are blue and orange. Its main rival is the Claremont-Mudd-Scripps Stags and Athenas (CMS), the other sports combination of the Claremont Colleges. The Sagehens ranked 15th out of 323 competing Division III schools and 2nd among SCIAC schools in the 2024‍–‍2025 Division III NACDA Directors' Cup, which ranks athletics programs and awards points relative to their finish in NCAA championships.

Club and intramural sports are also offered in various areas, such as dodgeball, flag football, and surfing. The physical education department offers a variety of activity classes each semester, such as karate, playground games, geocaching, and social dance.

=== Athletics history ===
Pitzer College began competing with Pomona College in 1970, when it was seven years old. The interim arrangement became permanent two years later.

== Cost and financial aid ==
For the 2024–25 academic year, tuition is $64,888, an estimated total cost of attendance is $89,792. About thirty-seven percent of Pitzer students receive financial assistance in loans, work study, scholarships, and/or institutional grants. Pitzer utilizes the Federal FAFSA and the CSS Profile to determine financial need, and Pitzer has stated a commitment to meeting 100% of every student's demonstrated financial need. The average financial aid package at Pitzer is $40,250. Since 2004, the college has significantly reduced the average amount of indebtedness of its students to $19,422, well below the national average of more than $35,000.

== Notable alumni ==
- Anne Archer 1969, actress
- Matthew Berkowitz, filmmaker
- David Bloom 1985, news anchor
- Max Brooks 1994, author and lecturer
- Matthew Cooke 1996, filmmaker
- Dennis Cooper, writer and performance artist
- John Darnielle 1995, novelist and singer-songwriter
- Kevin de León 2003, president of the California State Senate
- Eric Douglas, actor and comedian
- Mablean Ephriam 1971, former prosecutor for the city of Los Angeles and actress
- Eli Erlick 2016, transgender activist
- Susan Feniger 1976, celebrity chef
- Tom Freund 1993, singer-songwriter and musician
- Amy Gerstler 1978, poet
- Steven González 1985, Chief Justice of the Washington State Supreme Court
- Jenniphr Goodman 1984, writer/director
- Matthew Karatz 1994, deputy mayor of Los Angeles
- John Landgraf 1984, FX Network president
- J.Lately 2009, rapper
- Dana Levin 1987, poet
- Hunter Lovins, co-founder of Rocky Mountain Institute
- Setha Low 1969, anthropologist
- Jonah Matranga 1991, singer-songwriter
- Sandra Mitchell 1973, professor and philosopher of science
- Sharon Monsky 1975, founder of the Scleroderma Research Foundation
- Dee Mosbacher, documentary filmmaker, gay rights activist, and psychiatrist
- Debbie Mucarsel-Powell 1992, member of the U.S. House of Representatives from Florida's 26th congressional district
- Matt Nathanson 1995, singer-songwriter and musician
- Ashwin Navin 1998, CEO of Sambaa
- Fabian Núñez, former Speaker of the California State Assembly
- Susan Patron 1969, author
- Sarah Penna 2006, entrepreneur
- Nick Simmons 2011, reality television personality
- Sophie Simmons reality television personality
- Michael Simpson 1986, producer/composer
- Rob Magnuson Smith 1991, author
- Diana Vicezar 2023, Paraguayan entrepreneur
- Debra Wong Yang 1981, former United States Attorney

== Notable faculty ==
- Halford Fairchild, psychologist
- Judith Grabiner, mathematician
- Gina Lamb, artist activist
- David Moore, psychologist
- Gregg Popovich, men's basketball coach
- Dana Ward, political scientist
- Phil Zuckerman, sociologist

== See also ==
- Pomona-Pitzer College Athletics
