= CAIS =

CAIS may refer to:

== Organisations ==
- Canadian Academy of Independent Scholars
- Canadian Accredited Independent Schools
- Canadian Association for Information Science
- Canadian Association for Irish Studies
- Capitol Area Internet Service, an early ISP servicing the Washington, DC area until 2001; See Erol's Internet
- Center for AI Safety
- Changchun American International School
- Christian Alliance International School
- Chinese American International School

== Other uses ==
- Cais (surname)
- Complete androgen insensitivity syndrome
- Chemical Agent Identification Set
- Cais (song) - a song by Milton Nascimento
- Communications of the Association for Information Systems, an academic journal; See the founding editor Paul Gray

== See also ==
- Central American Integration System (Sistema de la Integración Centroamericana, or SICA)
- CAI (disambiguation)
  - Calcium–aluminium-rich inclusion (CAI)
