= Kai =

Kai or KAI may refer to:

== Arts and entertainment ==
=== Fictional entities ===
- Kai (name), includes list of fictional characters called Kai
- The Kai, a fictional society in the Lone Wolf gamebooks
- Cobra Kai, a fictional karate dojo in The Karate Kid movies and Cobra Kai streaming television series.
- Dragon Ball Z Kai, revised version of the anime series Dragon Ball Z

=== Music ===
- Kai (group), an Asian-American R&B musical group
- Kai (singer, born 1981), (Jung Ki-yeol), South Korean singer and actor
- Kai (Canadian singer) (Alessia De Gasperis-Brigante, born 1990), Canadian singer-songwriter
- Kai (musician, born 1993), musician in the Japanese metal band Esprit D'Air and English rock band The Sisters of Mercy
- Kai (entertainer, born 1994) (Kim Jong-in), South Korean singer, member of the South Korean-Chinese boy group Exo
  - Kai (EP), the 2020 eponymous debut extended play by Korean singer Kai
- "Kai!", a 2025 song by Olamide and Wizkid
- Kai, drummer in the Japanese rock band The Gazette
- Kai, a compilation album in the Dir En Grey discography (2001)
- "Kai", song by the Future Sound of London, from their 1994 album, ISDN
- Kai, a kind of overtone singing in the Altai Republic and Khakassia

== Businesses and organizations ==
- Korea Aerospace Industries, a South Korean aerospace company
- Kereta Api Indonesia, the Indonesian railway operator
  - KAI Commuter, an Indonesian commuter rail operator
- Communist Workers' International (German: Kommunistische Arbeiter-Internationale), a council communist international
- Studio Kai, a Japanese animation studio

== People ==
- Kai (name) includes lists of people with the given name and surname
- Kayı (tribe) or Kai tribe, an Oghuz Turkic people
- Kai (wrestler) (Atsushi Sakai, born 1983), Japanese professional wrestler
- Caleb Lawrence McGillvary, known for the viral video "Kai the Hatchet-Wielding Hitchhiker"

== Places ==
- Kai, Iran, a village in West Azerbaijan Province, Iran
- Kai Islands, Indonesia
- Kaï, Mali, a small town and commune
- Kai Province, an old Japanese province
- Kai, Yamanashi, a Japanese city
- Kaizhou District, formerly Kai County, Chongqing Municipality, China

== Other uses ==
- Kai (conjunction), in Greek, Coptic and Esperanto
- KaiOS, a mobile operating system for keypad feature phones
- Kai Restaurant, Arizona
- kai, ISO 639-3 language code for the language Karai-karai
- Kanaanäische und Aramäische Inschriften, standard source for text of Canaanite and Aramaic inscriptions not contained in Tanakh or Old Testament
- Kai stingaree (Urolophus kaianus), a species of stingray in the family Urolophidae
- Kai, a cultivar of Karuka
- Kai, in Māori cuisine and New Zealand cooking, a term widely used to refer to food
- Kai, short for Kai Ken, a Japanese dog breed named after the Kai Province
- Kai, the main protagonist in the upcoming anime series Tokyo Override
- Kai (film), an Indian film

== See also ==
- Yung Kai (born 2002), Canadian musician
- Cai (disambiguation)
- Kay (disambiguation)
- Kei (disambiguation)
- Kye (disambiguation)
