= Kei Kato =

Kei Kato may refer to:

- Rome Kanda, Japanese tarento, comedian and actor who has worked under the alias of Kei Kato
- Kei Katō, a Japanese women's professional shogi player

== See also ==
- Kei (disambiguation)
- Kato (disambiguation)
