= Claremont Graduate University =

Private graduate university in California, US

Coordinates: 34.10413°N 117.71267°W

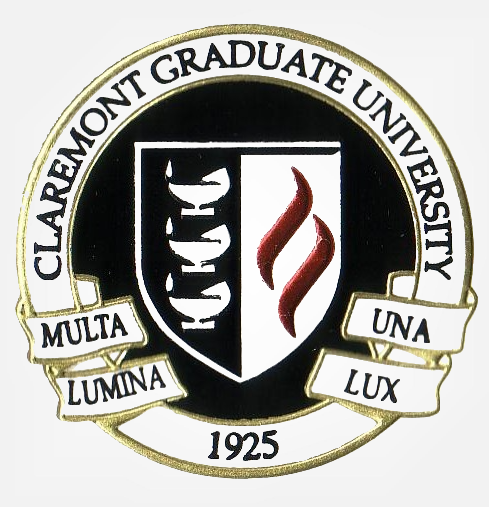
- Former names: Claremont University College (1925–1962); Claremont Graduate School and University Center (1962–1967); Claremont University Center (1967–1998)
- Motto: Multa lumina, una lux (Latin)
- Motto in English: "Many flames, one light"
- Type: Private postgraduate research university
- Established: 1925; 101 years ago
- Parent institution: Pomona College (2026-present)
- Affiliations: Claremont Colleges; NAICU
- Endowment: $205.7 million (2024)
- President: Michelle Bligh (interim)
- Faculty: 111 full-time, 88 part-time
- Students: 2,261 graduate students
- Location: Claremont, California, United States
- Campus: Suburban, 19 acres (7.7 ha)
- Website: cgu.edu

The Claremont Graduate University (CGU) is a private postgraduate research university in Claremont, California, United States. Founded in 1925, CGU is a member of the Claremont Colleges consortium which includes five undergraduate and two graduate institutions of higher education.

The university is organized into seven separate units: the School of Arts & Humanities; School of Community & Global Health; Drucker School of Management; School of Educational Studies; the School of Social Science, Policy, & Evaluation; the Center for Information Systems & Technology; and the Institute of Mathematical Sciences. It is classified among "R2: Doctoral Universities – High research activity."

== History ==
Founded in 1925, CGU was the second of the Claremont Colleges to form, following Pomona College and preceding Scripps College. The school has undergone several name changes since its inception. After being called Claremont University College for 37 years, in 1962 the school officially became known as Claremont Graduate School and University Center. Five years later, in 1967, the name was again changed to Claremont University Center, and in 1998 it acquired the name Claremont Graduate University.

The Claremont Colleges were designed to incorporate the Oxford Model of higher education. Instead of one large university composed of several separate schools, the Claremont Colleges are made up of different institutions designed around differing theories of pedagogy. CGU was founded upon the principle that graduate education is separate and distinct from undergraduate education. Students discover and cultivate their disciplines during undergraduate course work; at CGU students continue cultivation of their own disciplines, but are also expected to augment this with research that incorporates other disciplines as well. This is called "Transdisciplinarity" and is an essential component of Claremont Graduate University's functioning theory of pedagogy.

The school is home to more than 2,000 master's and PhD students, as well as approximately 200 full and part-time faculty members. The Carnegie Foundation for the Advancement of Teaching has classified Claremont Graduate University as a CompDoc/NMedVet: Comprehensive doctoral (no medical/veterinary) with high research activity. Its seven academic units and other related programs and institutes award master's and/or doctoral degrees in 31 disciplines. Enrollment is limited and classes are small. In 2018, the university also introduced its first online master's degree programs.

In October 2026, CGU announced a strategic partnership with Pomona College where the latter would become its parent institution and sole corporate member, after its alleged acquisition.

== Academics ==
=== Claremont Colleges ===
Among the contiguous CGU, Keck Graduate Institute of Applied Life Sciences, and undergraduate colleges (Pomona, Claremont McKenna, Harvey Mudd, Scripps, and Pitzer), cross-registration is free, and the members share libraries, health care, security, and other facilities.

=== Schools ===
==== Arts & Humanities ====
The School of Arts and Humanities includes departments in the fields of Art, Arts Management, Religion, History, English, Music, Cultural Studies, Archival Studies, Media Studies, and Applied Women's Studies. These subjects have an interest in interdisciplinary studies that provide disciplinary depth as well as cross-disciplinary flexibility.

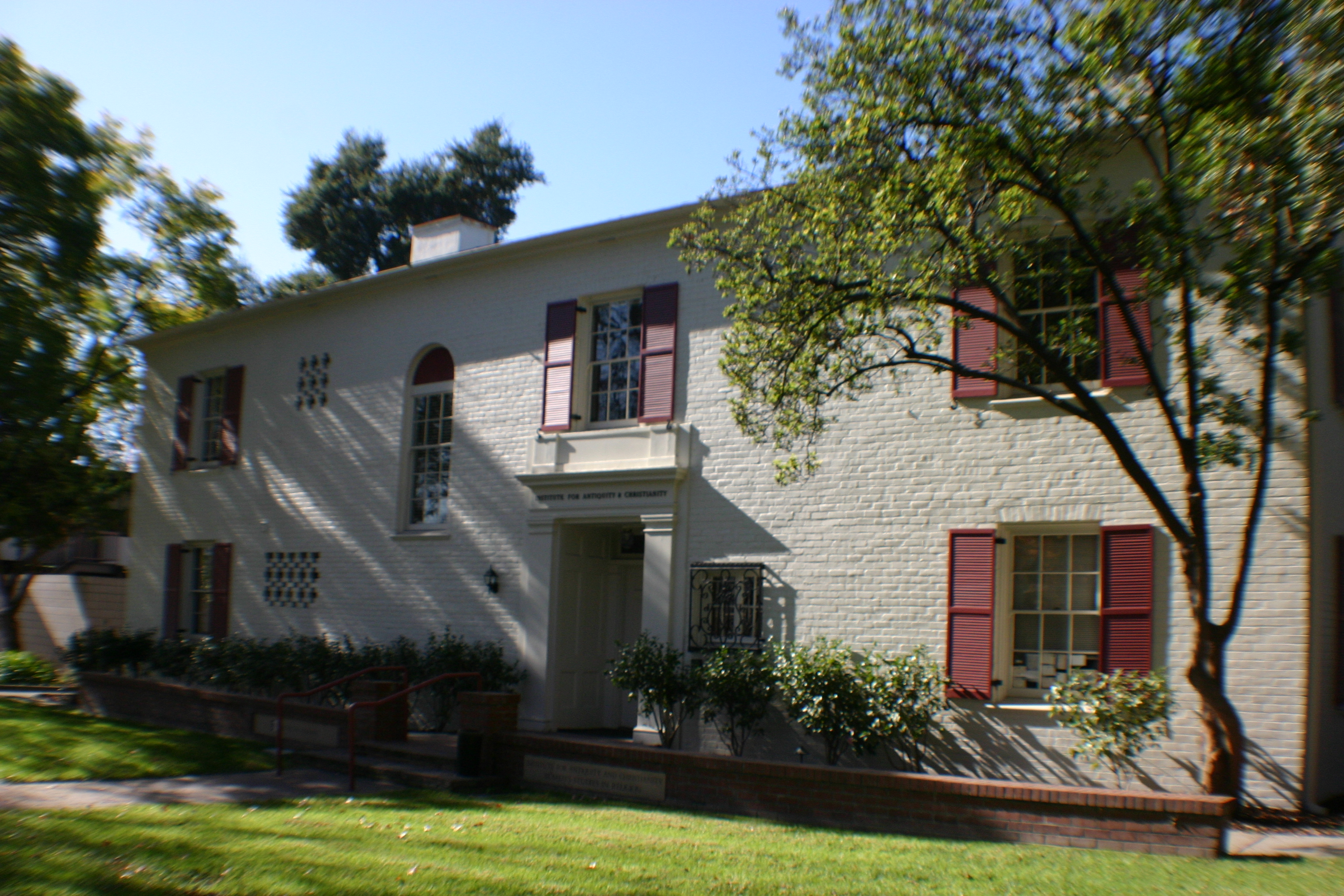
The Institute for Antiquity & Christianity, which houses the School of Arts and Humanities and the Department of Religion

In the Department of Religion, students can earn a degree with a focus in Mormon Studies, Catholicism, Islamic Studies, History of Christianity, Hebrew Bible, Indic Studies, Coptic Studies, Zoroastrianism; additional programs include Women's Studies in Religion, Religion and American Politics, Ethics and Culture, and Philosophy of Religion and Theology.

==== Social Science, Policy & Evaluation ====
SSSPE encompasses the Division of Politics and Economics and the Division of Behavioral and Organizational Sciences. SSSPE offers M.A. and Ph.D. programs in Political Science, American Politics & Political Philosophy, Public Policy & Evaluation, International Studies (Comparative and/or World Politics), International Political Economy, Economics, Global Commerce & Finance, and joint degrees with MBA. SSSPE offers the first Ph.D. and M.A. concentrations in the Western United States focused on the Science of Positive Psychology.. The program also offers the first Ph.D. degree in neuroeconomics which bridges economics, psychology, and cognitive neuroscience.

==== Community & Global Health ====
Formed in 2008, the School of Community and Global Health is dedicated to generating scientific knowledge about the causes and prevention of disease and the improvement of health and well-being of diverse populations locally and globally. The school is responsible for training professional practitioners to translate prevention science into improved practice and policy for health promotion and disease prevention at the individual, community and global levels.

The school offers a Ph.D. in Health Promotion Sciences, DrPh., M.P.H. degrees; the M.P.H. program, which has a variety of concentrations, is accredited by the Council on Education for Public Health. As of 2019, the school enrolled over 140 students, had a 12:1 student-faculty ratio, and had over 90 alumni.

==== Drucker School of Management ====
The Peter F. Drucker and Masatoshi Ito School of Management follows the Drucker philosophy based on people (management as a human enterprise, as a liberal art) and looks beyond traditional perceptions of economics, instead espousing management as a liberal art, focusing on social theory, history, and sustainability.

==== Educational Studies ====
The School of Educational Studies offers the M.A. and Ph.D in Teaching, Learning and Culture, Education Policy, Evaluation and Reform, Higher Education/Student Affairs, Special Education and Urban Educational Leadership.

==== Center for Information Systems & Technology ====
CISAT was founded in 1983 by Paul Gray as an independent entity. Unconstrained by a typical business school structure, students are allowed to focus specifically on those topics associated with IS&T. The school provides a solid technical grounding in IT systems, while at the same time, addressing the significant management challenges to designing, developing, implementing and assessing IT systems in applied business and governmental settings.

==== Institute of Mathematical Sciences ====
The Institute of Mathematical Sciences offers a variety of masters and doctoral degrees, and maintains a strong applied research component through its internationally recognized Engineering and Industrial Applied Mathematics Clinic, offering students first-hand experience in solving significant problems in applied mathematics for business and industry clients. IMS also provides joint programs in financial engineering, computational science, and computational and systems biology.

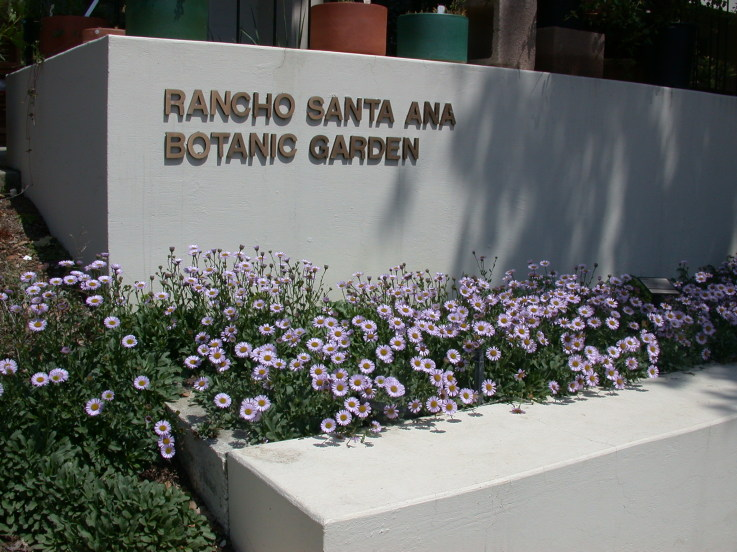
California Botanic Garden

=== Other programs and institutes ===
==== Botany Department ====
In conjunction with the California Botanic Garden, Claremont Graduate University offers master's and doctoral degrees in botany emphasizing systematics and evolution of higher plants. Subfields include monographic and revisionary studies, cytotaxonomy, molecular systematics, phylogenetics, plant anatomy and comparative aspmorphology, ecology, plant geography, and reproductive biology.

==== Peter F. Drucker Institute ====
Peter Drucker Institute is a think tank established to advance the principles of Peter F. Drucker.

==== Museum Leadership Institute ====
The Museum Leadership Institute at Claremont Graduate University is a source of continuing professional development for current and future leaders of museums and other nonprofit institutions.

CGU also has a number of other institutes and affiliations, including Sotheby's Institute of Art, the Claremont Evaluation Center, the Quality of Life Research Center, and the Institute for Democratic Renewal, among several others.

== Campus ==
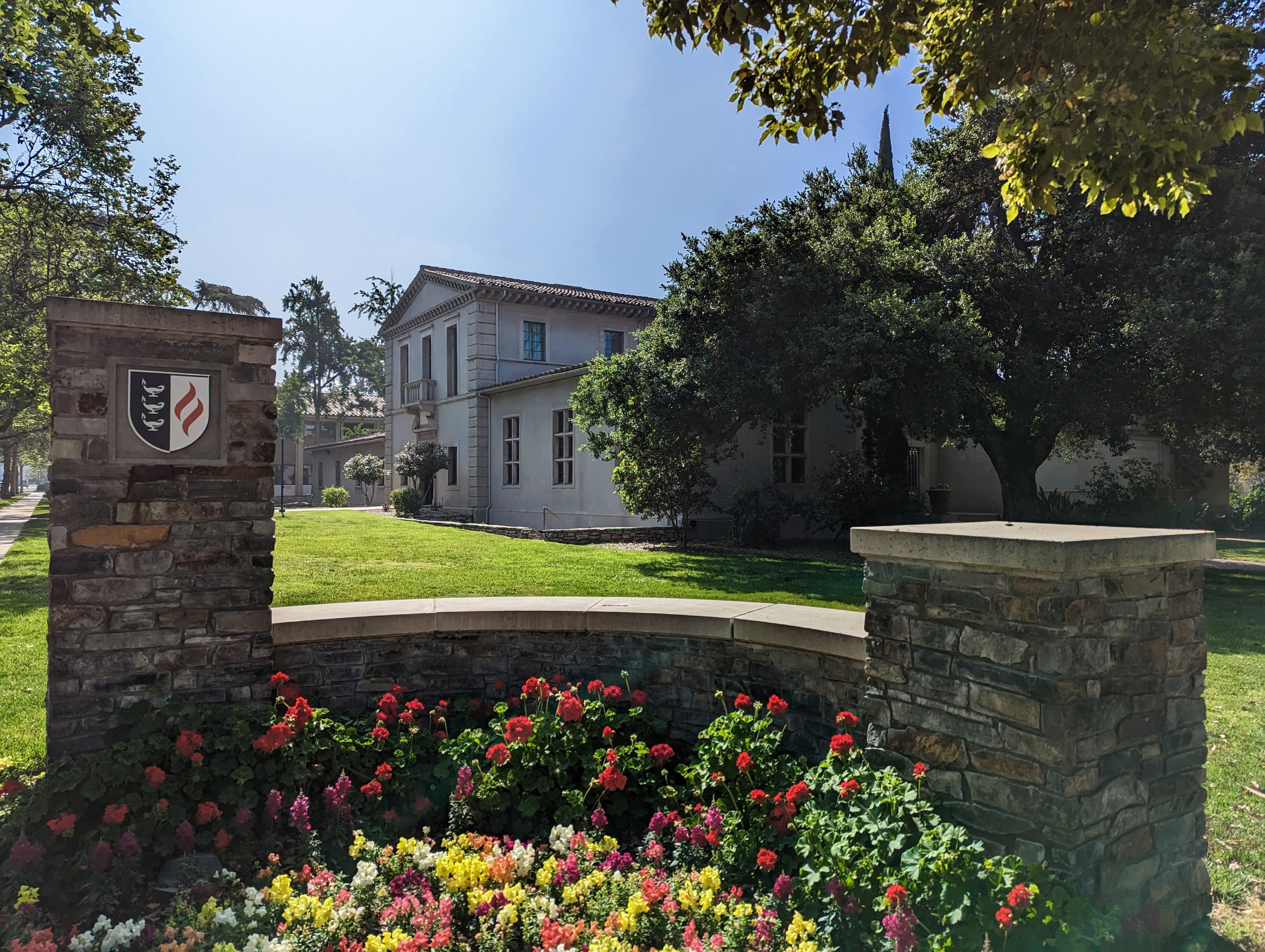
Stone wall marking campus entrance

=== Location and buildings ===
As part of the Claremont Colleges, CGU sits on 550 acres (220 ha) of land and includes over 175 buildings that is home to The Claremont Colleges Services in Claremont, California.

In July 2007, CNN/Money magazine ranked Claremont as one of the top 5 places to live in the United States.

Harper Hall

==== Harper Hall ====
Harper Hall is the oldest building on CGU's campus, originally housing the graduate library. It is now the administration building centralizing CGU's student and administrative functions. Classrooms and study areas take up a majority of Harper Hall's lower level.

==== Stauffer Hall and Albrecht Auditorium ====
Stauffer Hall (with Albrecht Auditorium attached to it) is a three-level academic building where the School of Educational Studies' Teacher Education program offices are located. Additionally, The East Gallery and the Peggy Phelps Gallery have been relocated to Stauffer Hall after the closure of the (now former) CGU Art Building. Students from CGU's Music program utilize the bottom floor of Stauffer Hall and the Albrecht Auditorium to rehearse and practice.

Albrecht Auditorium is the largest class on CGU's campuses, often used for recital events and for TEDx talks.

==== Academic Computing Building ====
The ACB is a three-story, 27,000-square-foot (2,500 m^{2}) facility completed in 1985, which was renovated in 2009 to include the third floor. It houses academic computing resources, the School of Social Science, Policy, & Evaluation, the Center for Information Systems and Technology, two computer labs, and the Kay E-Health Center. It is also home to the Paul Gray PC Museum.

==== Ron W. Burkle Building ====
The Ron W. Burkle building was completed in 1998. Named after CGU fellow Ronald Burkle, it is currently home to the Peter Drucker and Masatoshi Ito Graduate School of Management. It is a three-story, 36,000-square-foot (3,300 m^{2}) facility housing offices, classrooms and lecture halls, the Drucker Library and the Drucker Institute.

==== Former CGU Art Building ====
The CGU Art Building was previously home to two galleries, The East Gallery and the Peggy Phelps Gallery. This building was sold to Scripps College in 2024.

==== Paul Gray PC Museum ====
The Paul Gray PC Museum is a computer museum at Claremont Graduate University. It is named in honor of the late Paul Gray, a former professor at the university who founded CGU's information sciences program, and is located in the Center for Information Systems and Technology. As of 12 November 2005, the museum is showing the "Best PCs Ever", based on the article "The 25 Greatest PCs of All Time" published by PC World.

== The Kingsley & Kate Tufts Poetry Awards ==
Claremont Graduate University is home to the Kingsley and Kate Tufts Poetry Awards. Each award is presented annually to an American poet for a collection of poetry written in the English language. The $100,000 Kingsley award was established in 1992 by Kate Tufts to honor her late husband, poet and writer Kingsley Tufts. It is the largest monetary prize in the nation for a mid-career poet. A year later, the $10,000 Kate Tufts Discovery Award was established to recognize promising early-career poets.

== Administrators ==
=== List of Presidents ===
#	Image	President	Term start	Term end	Ref.
1		James A. Blaisdell	1925	1936	
acting		William S. Ament	1935 (Note: Acting president. Note: Overlap in years because Ament was hired July 1, 1935, while Blaisdell was on sabbatical.)	1937	
2		Russell Story	1937	1942	
3		Robert J. Bernard (Note: Bernard ran the university from 1942 to 1959 under the title administrative director.)	1959	1963	
acting		William W. Clary	1963	1963	
4		Louis T. Benezet	1963	1970	
5		Howard R. Bowen	1970	1971	
6		Barnaby Keeney	1971	1976	
7		Joseph B. Platt	1976	1981	
8		John D. Maguire	1981	1998	
0		Steadman Upham	1998	2004	
Interim		William Everhart	2004	2005	
10		Robert Klitgaard	July 1, 2005	February 19, 2009	
Interim		Joseph C. Hough, Jr.	February 20, 2009	November 14, 2010	
11		Deborah A. Freund	November 15, 2010	June 30, 2014	
Interim		Robert Schult	July 1, 2015	December 31, 2016	
Interim		Jacob Adams	January 1, 2017	June 30, 2018	
12		Len Jessup	July 1, 2018	June 1, 2024	
Interim		Tim Kirley	June 2, 2024	Present	

Table notes:

Note: There appears a discrepancy in the numbering of presidents in the official Claremont Graduate University news articles since earlier include interim and acting presidents while later ones do not.

== See also ==
- List of postgraduate-only institutions

== Bibliography ==
- Bernard, Robert J., An Unfinished Dream: A Chronicle of the Group Plan of the Claremont Colleges; The Castle Press, 1982.
- Blaisdell, James Arnold, The Story of a Life: An Autobiography; Penn Lithographics, 1984.
- Clary, William W., The Claremont Colleges: A History of the Development of the Claremont Group Plan; The Castle Press, 1970.
- Douglass, Malcolm P (2010). Phoenix in Academe: The Birth and Early Development of the Claremont Graduate University, 1925-1952. Xlibris. ISBN 9781450097659. OCLC 1035675923.
