= Alan J. Viergutz =

Venezuelan business executive (born 1953)

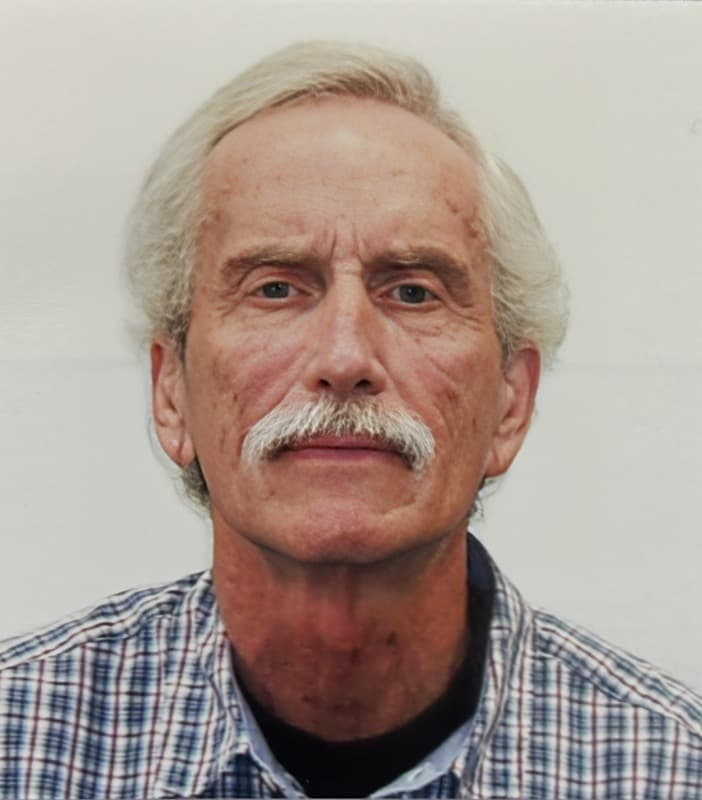
- Alan J. Viergutz
- Born: 1953 (age 72–73); Montevideo Uruguay
- Citizenship: Citizen of U.S.A., France, Uruguay and Venezuela
- Education: Stanford University
- Occupations: Petroleum analyst and corporate executive
- Employer: Grupo Centec
- Title: President and chairman
- Awards: Order of Merit of Work and the Order of Francisco de Miranda

Alan J. Viergutz (born 1953) is the president of Grupo Centec. Viergutz is a former president of the Venezuelan Oil Chamber and works additionally as an oil-industry analyst.

== Early life and education ==
Viergutz spent his early years studying at the Lycee Francais in Montevideo, Uruguay and afterwards at the Colegio Francia in Caracas, Venezuela. He graduated from Phillips Exeter Academy in 1970 and attended Stanford University and Claremont College between 1970 and 1977, where he received a bachelor's degree in industrial engineering, a master’s in mechanical engineering, and an MBA. Afterwards he received a PhD.

== Career ==
Viergutz is a former president of the Venezuelan Oil Chamber. He was one of the first analysts to alert the wider industry to the problems resulting from the "Aperture" of the Caldera government and the attempts by Hugo Chavez to convert the Venezuelan Oil Industry into a tool in developing a socialistic State. Viergutz now serves as president and chairman of Grupo Centec, a group of six Venezuelan petroleum-related firms. In addition to his work with Grupo Centec Viergutz works as an oil industry analyst out of Caracas, commenting in the media regarding trends related to the industry, such as OPEC policies.

Viergutz wrote a self-published book, 1995-2001, Years of Upheaval in the Venezuelan Oil Industry, published in 2002. He has also commented on other aspects of Venezuelan society in the media, including political and social current events, in addition to foreign-based oil-related events.

Viergutz has acted as advisor to the Venezuelan government and has represented Venezuelan petroleum interests abroad at events like the 1996 OPEC Convention and the World Petroleum Congress. Venezuelan commissions and governing bodies he has been on have included the National Petrochemical Commission, the Economic Commission of the Chamber of Deputies, the Advisory Commission of the Ministry of Energy and Mines, and the Energy and Mines Commission of the Congress of the Republic. In the public sector he has been on the Council of Venezuelan and US Managers and the Pro-Defensa del Petróleo. In the private sector he has been the director of Fedecámaras, the National Chamber of Commerce and Industry, and Director of Consecomercio, the National Chamber of Commerce in Venezuela.

Viergutz is an airplane pilot with an SEL/MEL (IFR) license including SOLO flying with Citation Jet CE510 rating
