= Robert J. Bernard Field Station =

Biological field station in Claremont, California, United States

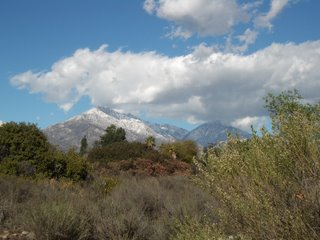
Mountains seen across coastal sage scrub in the Bernard Field Station

The 85 acre Robert J. Bernard Biological Field Station (BFS) is located on the north side of Foothill Boulevard between College Avenue and Mills Avenue in Claremont, California. The BFS provides facilities and ecological communities for high-quality teaching and research in biological, environmental, and other sciences to the students, faculty, and staff of the Claremont Colleges. It may also be used by members of other academic institutions and by public groups for educational purposes and is home to the FLUXNET site US-BFS. The BFS is a member of the Organization of Biological Field Stations. It was named after Claremont Colleges president Robert J. Bernard.

== Mission statement ==
The mission statement of the Bernard Field Station, taken from the station's website, is the following:

"To provide facilities and ecological communities for high-quality teaching and research experiences in the biological, environmental, and other sciences, to the students, faculty, and staff of the Claremont Colleges."[2]

Implied in the BFS mission is that this community resource exists and is valued for its pedagogic and ecological benefit to the Claremont Colleges and larger Claremont community.

== Use ==
The BFS is a natural laboratory in which the scientific study of natural processes takes place. It is unusual for college students to have a field station within walking distance of the rest of their campus. Although the facility is located in the center of the city, the fence allows projects to be conducted without outside disturbance. The diversity of habitats, both natural and man-made, provides a wealth of possibilities for teaching and experimentation.

=== Educational programs ===
Students in introductory and upper-level courses at the five undergraduate colleges (Claremont McKenna College, Harvey Mudd College, Pitzer College, Pomona College, and Scripps College) use the facility. More specifically, the following programs are affiliated with the station: Harvey Mudd College Biology, Keck Science Department of Scripps, Pitzer, and Claremont McKenna Colleges, Pitzer College Environmental Analysis, Pomona College Biology, Pomona College Environmental Analysis, California Botanic Garden. The station is integral to many regular courses within these programs, and provides the opportunity for independent research projects. Additionally, the BFS has been used by courses in art, anthropology, archaeology, astronomy, and English as a Second Language. Pitzer's Leadership in Environmental Education Partnership (LEEP) program brings many elementary schoolchildren to the station each year. The US Geological Survey maintains a monitoring station on the grounds and both long and short-term research projects are carried out by faculty from the Claremont Colleges and from other institutions. Although the main purpose of the Station is as a teaching and research facility for the Claremont Colleges’ students, its contributions to the greater community have been substantial. Since its beginning in 1976, the Station has been visited by many Claremont schoolchildren, Scouts, and community groups. Since this land formed part of the home village site of the Gabrieleno- people, the Station provides an area for cultural and ethnobotanical study. This site also contains some of the natural landscape of Claremont looking much as it did before development. It therefore provides opportunities to investigate natural relationships and the effects on them of surrounding development, as well as being of historical interest.

=== 2015-16 use statistics ===
The Robert J. Bernard Field Station Annual Report presents the following use statistics for the 2015–16 academic year:

1. Gathered from 5,811 days of monitoring, on average, more than 15 people use the resources of the BFS each day.

2. 29 courses at the Claremont Colleges used the field station as a part of their course curriculum, providing hands-on educational experiences to approximately 855 students.

3. 28 research projects affiliated with the Claremont Colleges were conducted at the BFS. 5 of which were senior thesis projects, and faculty published four articles relating to research conducted at the BFS.

4. The Leadership in Environmental Education Partnership (LEEP) through Pitzer College brought over 150 fifth and sixth graders to learn about Southern California ecology.

5. The BFS was the location for the third annual BFS Earth Day Event, where over 100 people from the community visited the BFS for celebratory and educational opportunities.

6. Outside of the Claremont Colleges, the BFS hosted four classes from other institutions including Cal Poly Pomona, CSU Fullerton, and Pasadena City College. Additionally, the BFS provided resources for 8 research projects from UC Riverside, Arizona State University, Cal Poly Pomona, UC Davis, CSU Fullerton, and York University.

7. The BFS is primarily maintained by volunteers. In the 2015–2016 academic year, over 75 volunteers participated in the volunteer program, averaging out to about 290 volunteer hours. The majority of volunteer work involves removing invasive plants and clearing up overgrown trails.

== Habitat ==
The BFS contains native plant communities mixed with an array of drought-tolerant Old World species that have become naturalized in southern California. The average annual rainfall in Claremont is about 15 inches and the BFS is located on an alluvial fan which means the soil is fast-draining. Because of these factors, organisms are adapted to low water availability and the landscape is brown and dry much of the year.

Approximately two-thirds of the Station is coastal sage scrub. This ecosystem was never common and has largely disappeared due to development. Estimates are that less than 15% of it remains. It is part of the Mediterranean Biome. Coastal sage scrub consists mostly of small to medium shrubs which are adapted to winter rains and long, dry summers, and annuals which complete their life cycle in the spring. There are grasslands in the south and the east. The northeastern portion was at one time a citrus grove and is now a grassland. Oaks were planted along the road to the now-disused Infirmary, which was built in the 1930s to house ill students from Pomona College. An open-air outdoor classroom has been constructed next to it, and both native and exotic species grow in the area around these buildings. A natural stand of oak-sycamore woodland can be found in the “neck” where water seeps up along an earthquake fault. A riparian forest has grown up around the artificial lake.

== Organisms ==
The field station website contains lists and photographs of many species found there. Some of the common plants are California Sagebrush, buckwheat, yerba santa, white sage, golden currant, and redberry, along with poison oak. The lake is a refuge for Western Pond Turtles displaced by development. The BFS houses a number of Species of Special Concern such as the Coastal Cactus Wren, Nevin's Barberry, and the Silvery Legless Lizard. Surveys of the organisms are still underway. So far, over 170 species of birds, 27 species of mammals, 17 species of reptiles and amphibians, over 250 species of higher plants, 40 species of lichen (one new to science--Lecanora munzii ), and many hundreds of species of insects and other invertebrates have been identified. Recently, a mite (a new, undescribed Parateneriffia species: J. Exp. Biol. 213: 2551–2556) with exceptional heat tolerance and speed was discovered here.

=== Invasive species ===
While the BFS provides a sanctuary for many Southern California species, certain invasive species have been introduced to the area and directly affect the native wildlife of the region. Several of these exotic species include Tree Tobacco, the Mexican Fan Palm, the Bird of Paradise Shrub. Efforts to eradicate these species are undertaken by the volunteer program.

==== Economic and environmental implications ====
The presence of invasive plants and animals has both negative environmental and economic implications in that the introduced species are responsible for direct damage and control costs on the BFS, as well as their invasiveness on native species. While the BFS is itself a public good, the control of invasive species is likewise a public good. As a positive externality, the volunteer efforts to remove invasive species from the BFS are undersupplied. While the BFS has strict regulations regarding who can visit/enter the station, the presence of invasive species is inevitable and certainly has economic implications as a public good.

==== On-site related research ====
In the published journal article by Thomson et al. titled "Why are native annual abundances low in invaded grasslands? Testing the effects of competition and seed limitation," the authors investigate the implications of competitive suppression on native species by exotic grasses.

Staubus et al. investigates how native arthropods are affected by invasive species in "Carbon and nitrogen storage in California sage scrub and non-native grassland habitats." These species invade both Southern California's threatened Sage Scrub, as well as include non-native Argentine Ants.

== History of the station ==
In the 1920s, Pomona College was under strong pressure to expand. Rather than do that and reduce the benefits of a small, liberal arts institution to Pomona's students, President Blaisdell conceived the idea of forming a group of small colleges that would fund some facilities in common. His vision inspired Ellen Browning Scripps to buy 250 acres of land and donate it for educational use. This land underlies parts of the present colleges, the School of Theology, and the California Botanic Garden (formerly Rancho Santa Ana Botanic Garden). Some of the land was sold. Some is leased to the Claremont Golf Course. None of the plans for building on the remaining 85 acres succeeded, and gradually this land came to be used as an informal teaching facility. In 1975, there was a proposal to sell this portion of the Scripps Trust to developers. In order to prevent this, Donald McKenna raised the money necessary to buy the land from the Trust. The donation also paid for fencing the area and for construction of pHake Lake (1978), and provided a small endowment. In 1980, the facility was officially opened and named in honor of Robert J. Bernard who had been involved in the development of the colleges since the beginning of the Group Plan.

In Robert Bernard's book about the history of the Claremont Colleges, “An Unfinished Dream”, he states:“A tour of the property readily convinces visitors of the importance of keeping such a beautiful expanse of land, shrubs, and trees for scientific purposes.” However, the future of the Station is uncertain. In 2001, the Claremont Consortium agreed not to build on the central portion for 50 years, following intense student protests against plans to locate the Keck Graduate Institute on them. Since then, Harvey Mudd College has purchased the western 11.4 acres for future development, and will sell half of this to Claremont Graduate University for their expansion plans. There is no agreement to preserve any of the rest. In fall 2010, Pitzer College proposed purchasing 14 acres to the east of the temporarily protected portion with the intention of renovating the Infirmary and establishing a new institute centered there. The area would be added to the habitat that is temporarily preserved. This proposal has not yet gained approval from the consortium. The Friends of the Bernard Biological Field Station (FBBFS) produce newsletters which include updates on the situation and information on the plants and animals, as well as on other items of interest.

=== Management ===
The Robert J. Bernard Field Station is managed by a Director in consultation with a Faculty Advisory Committee. The Faculty Advisory Committee is composed of one representative from each of the major Claremont College programs affiliated with the station (Harvey Mudd College Biology, Keck Science Department of Scripps, Pitzer, and Claremont McKenna Colleges, Pitzer College Environmental Analysis, Pomona College Biology, Pomona College Environmental Analysis, California Botanic Garden). This committee advises the director on: academic uses and research, appropriate usage by community groups, habitat maintenance and traffic monitoring, as well as budgetary needs.

=== Funding ===
According to the 2015-16 Annual Report, the BFS received grants from the Henry David Thoreau Foundation ($31,000) for funding student research, the National Science Foundation ($23,879) towards field station planning, and Schenk Fund ($4000) intended for research on plants.

With these funds, the director was able to hire 26 student researchers, as well as hire and train 12 student education interns, whose job is to implement environmental curriculum for fourth graders in the Claremont Unified School District.

== Publications ==
The following includes a list of publications written about research conducted at the BFS:

1. Hollowell, A. C., J. U. Regus, D. Turissini, K. A. Gano- Cohen, R. Bantay, A. Bernardo, D. Moore, J. Pham, and J. L. Sachs. 2016. Metapopulation dominance and genomic island acquisition of Bradyrhizobium with superior catabolic capabilities. Proceedings of the Royal Society B: Biological Sciences 283: 20160496.

2. Wheeler, M. M., M. M. Dipman, T. A. Adams, A. V. Ruina, C. R. Robins, and W. M. Meyer III. 2016. Carbon and nitrogen storage in California sage scrub and non-native grassland habitats. Journal of Arid Environments 129: 119-125

3. Thomson, D. M., R. Cruz-de Hoyos, K. Cummings, and E. L. Schultz. 2016. Why are native annual abundances low in invaded grasslands? Testing the effects of competition and seed limitation. Plant Ecology 217: 431–432.

4. Hollowell, A. C., J. U. Regus, K. A. Gano, R. Bantay, D. Centeno, J. Pham, J.Y. Lyu, D. Moore, A. Bernardo, G. Lopez, A. Patil, S. Patil, Y, Lii, and J. L. Sachs. 2016. Epidemic spread of symbiotic and non-symbiotic Bradyrhizobium genotypes across California. Microbial Ecology 71: 700–710.
