= Kei =

Kei or KEI may refer to:

== People ==
- Kei (given name)
- Kei, Cantonese for Ji (姫)
- Kei, Cantonese for Qi (奇, 祁, 亓)
- Shō Kei (1700–1752), king of the Ryūkyū Kingdom
- Kei (singer) (born 1995), stage name of South Korean singer Kim Ji-yeon
- Princess Kei (Keihime; died 1649) of Japan
- Kei Nishikori (born 1989), Japanese professional tennis player
- Kei Garō (ケイ ガロウ; born 1981), Japanese illustrator best known as the original character designer of Hatsune Miku

== Automobiles ==
- Kei car, a Japanese category of small automobiles
  - Suzuki Kei, a kei car produced by Suzuki between 1998 and 2009
- Kei truck, a Japanese category of small pickup trucks
  - Scion KEI-01, a rebadged Daihatsu Hijet

== In fiction ==
- xxxHolic: Kei, the second season of the anime
- Sir Kei or Sir Kay, a character in Arthurian legend
- Kei, a character in Akira media
- Kei, a character in Dirty Pair media
- Kei, a character in the Ape Escape universe
- Kei, a fictional country in Twelve Kingdoms media
- Kei, a character in Moon Child
- Kei Nagase, a character in the Ace Combat universe
- Kei, short for Keiichiro, a character in Wangan Midnight and Wangan Midnight Maximum Tune

== KEI ==
- Knowledge Ecology International, dealing with issues of intellectual property
- Knowledge Economic Index, on knowledge economy
- Keyword Effectiveness Index for a web site
- Kinetic Energy Interceptor, former planned American missile defense program
- Keithley Instruments, NYSE symbol

== Other uses ==
- Kei or Kai Islands, part of the Maluku Islands, Indonesia
  - Kei language
- kei(x), one of the Kelvin functions
- Kei school of Buddhist sculpture, Japan
- Kei Rail, a South African rail project
- Kei cricket team, South Africa
- Kei, subgroup of the Kugyō in the Japanese pre-Meiji court
- Great Kei River, in South Africa
- a style in Japanese street fashion or a Japanese pop subculture, e.g. Visual kei
- Kei (ritual gong), a Japanese musical instrument

== See also ==
- Kai (disambiguation)
- KIE (disambiguation)
