= KYE =

KYE or Kye may refer to:

- Kye (given name)
- Kye (surname)
- Kye (video game)
- Kye Hill, Huntly, Aberdeenshire
- KYE Systems, a Taiwanese computer peripheral manufacturer
- Key Monastery, Lahaul & Spiti District, Himachal Pradesh, India
- Cows, in Scotland and northern England
- The Korean variant of rotating savings and credit association
- An initialism of Know Your Enemy (disambiguation)
