= Robert J. Bernard =

American academic administrator

Robert James Bernard (February 6, 1894 – June 9, 1981) was an American academic administrator. He was instrumental in the founding of the Claremont Colleges, a consortium of adjacent, affiliated higher education institutions in Claremont, California, and served as its leader from 1942 to 1963.

== Early life ==
Bernard was born in Collinwood, Ohio, and grew up in Denver, Colorado. He briefly attended Colorado College before transferring to Pomona College when his family moved to Hollywood. He majored in English and graduated in 1917.

== Career ==
After graduation, he became an assistant to Pomona president James Blaisdell. When the Claremont Colleges were established in 1925, he was appointed secretary under Blaisdell. He became administrative director in 1942; his title changed to managing director in 1944 and president in 1959.

== Later life ==
Bernard retired in February 1963. He was president and then executive director of the Association of California Independent Colleges and Universities between 1961 and 1967. He wrote a history of the Claremont Colleges, titled An Unfinished Dream, shortly before his death in 1981.

== Legacy ==
The Bernard Field Station, a biological research station owned by the Claremont Colleges, is named after him.

== Bibliography ==
- Drake, Frances Bernard (1996). Two Men and an Idea: Robert Bernard with James Blaisdell, Partners in Pioneering the Group Plan of the Claremont Colleges. Claremont University Center. OCLC 35369939.
- A Brief History of the Group Plan of the Claremont Colleges. Claremont, California: Claremont University Center. 1993.
- Bernard, Robert J. (1982). An Unfinished Dream: A Chronicle of the Group Plan of The Claremont Colleges. Claremont, California: Claremont University Center. OCLC 9199564.
