= Claremont Colleges =

College consortium in Claremont, California

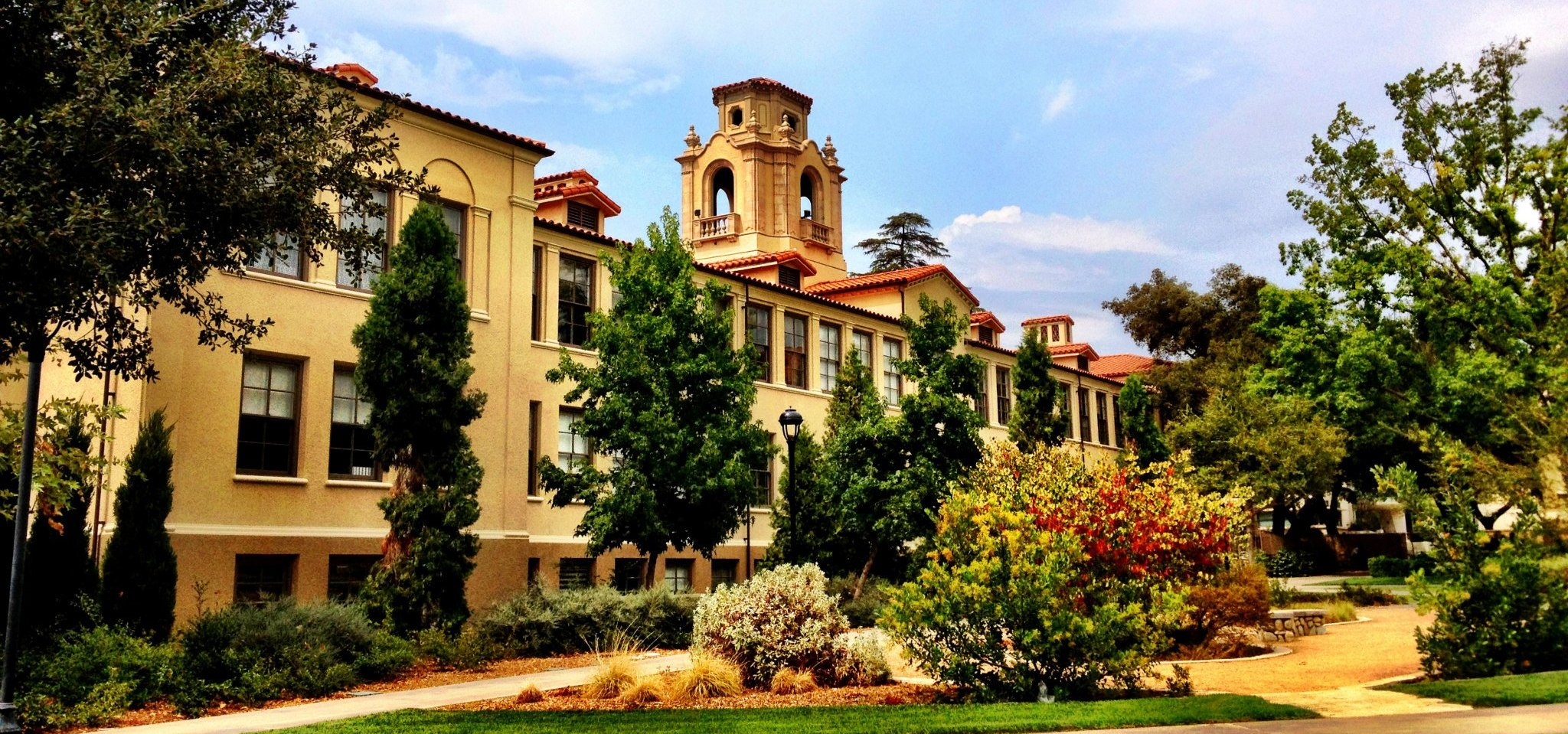
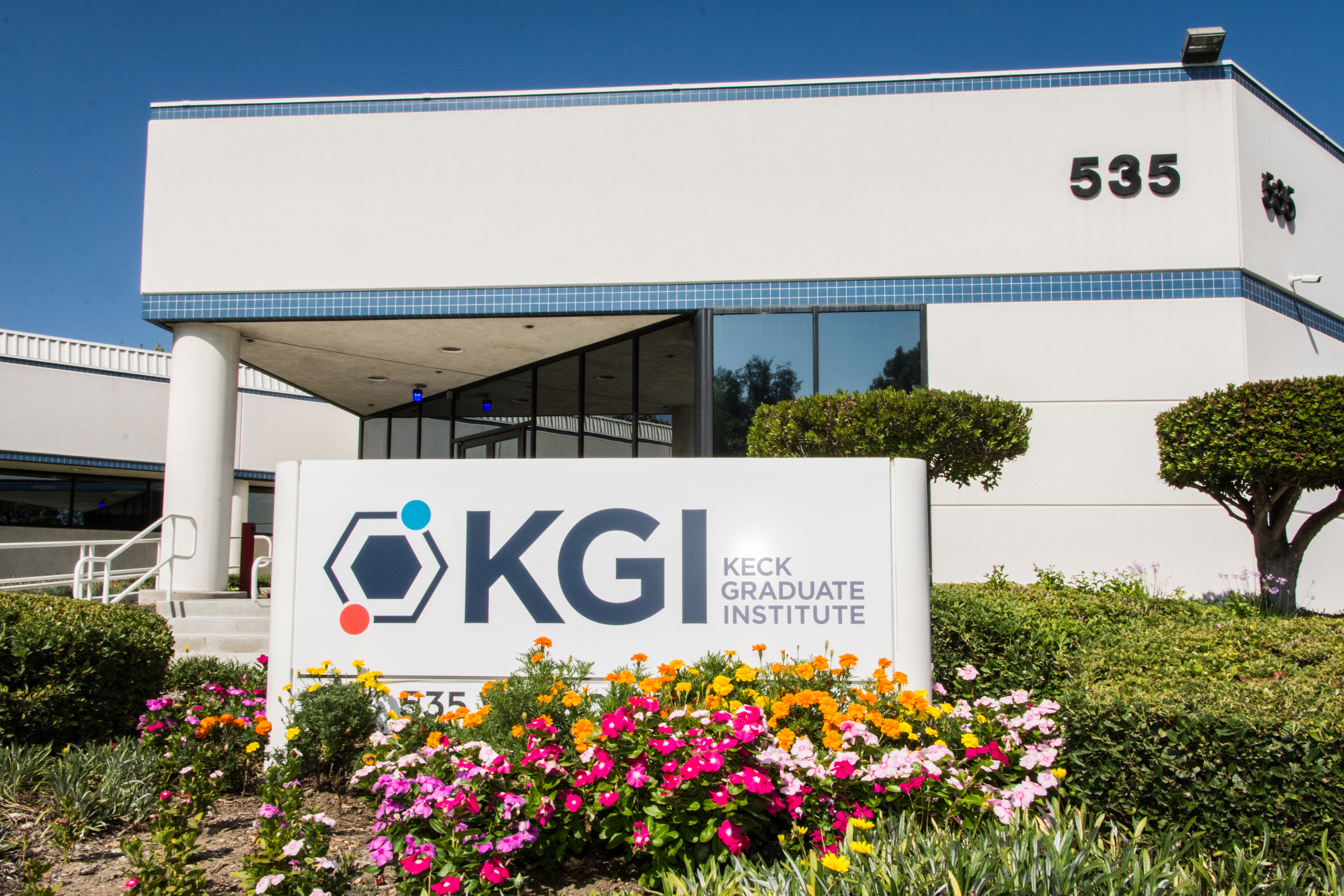
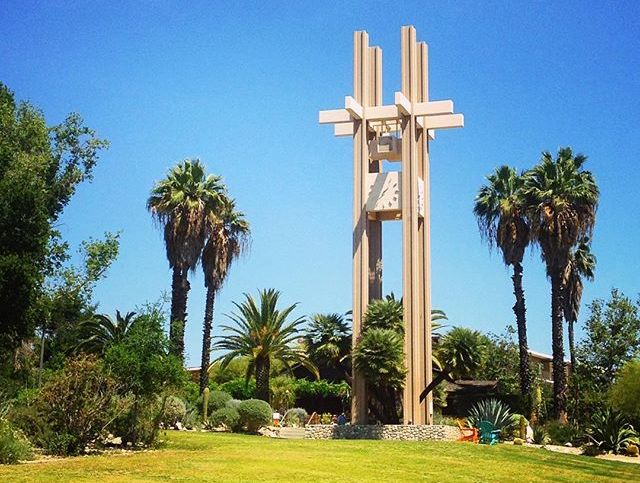
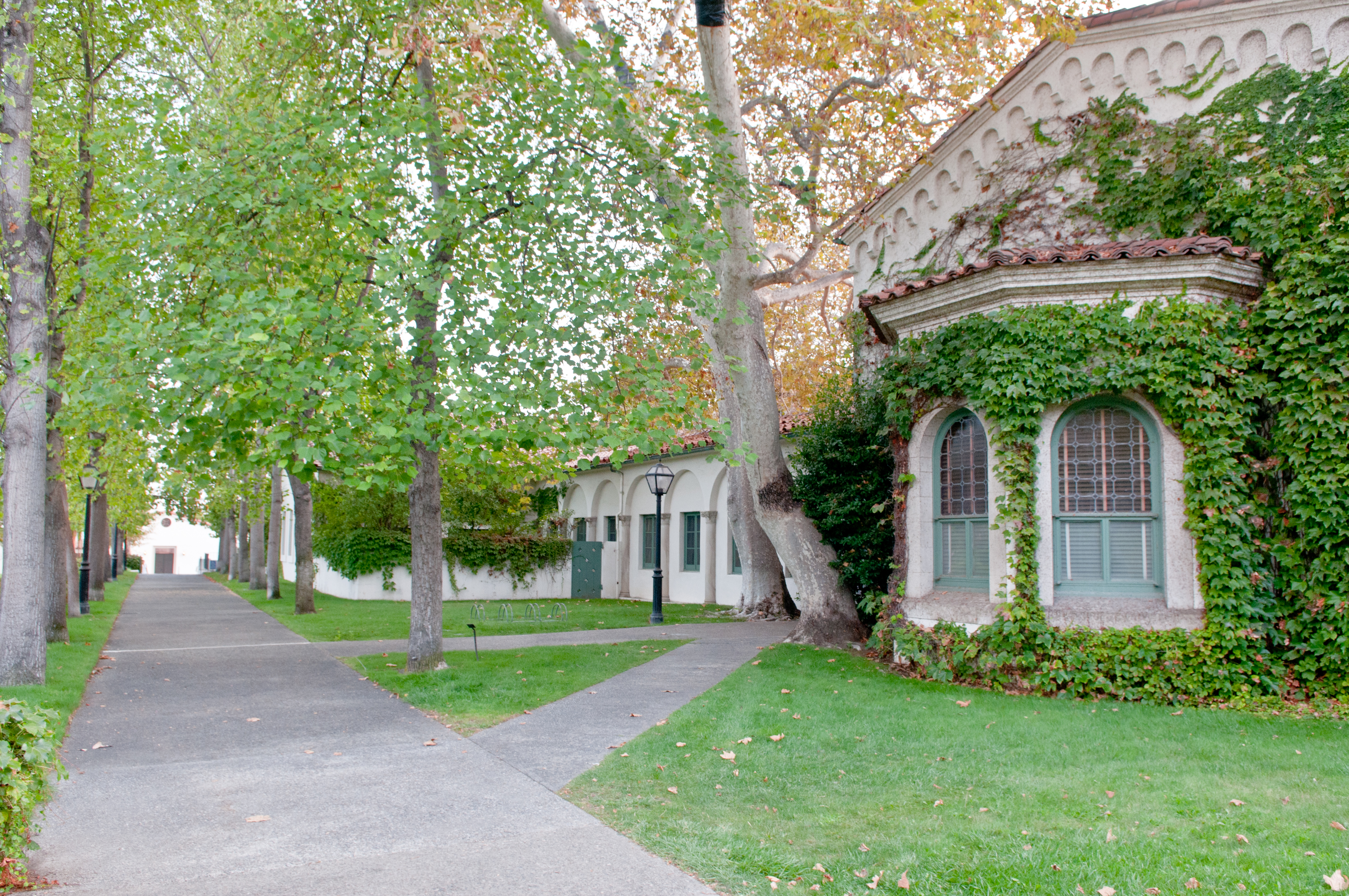
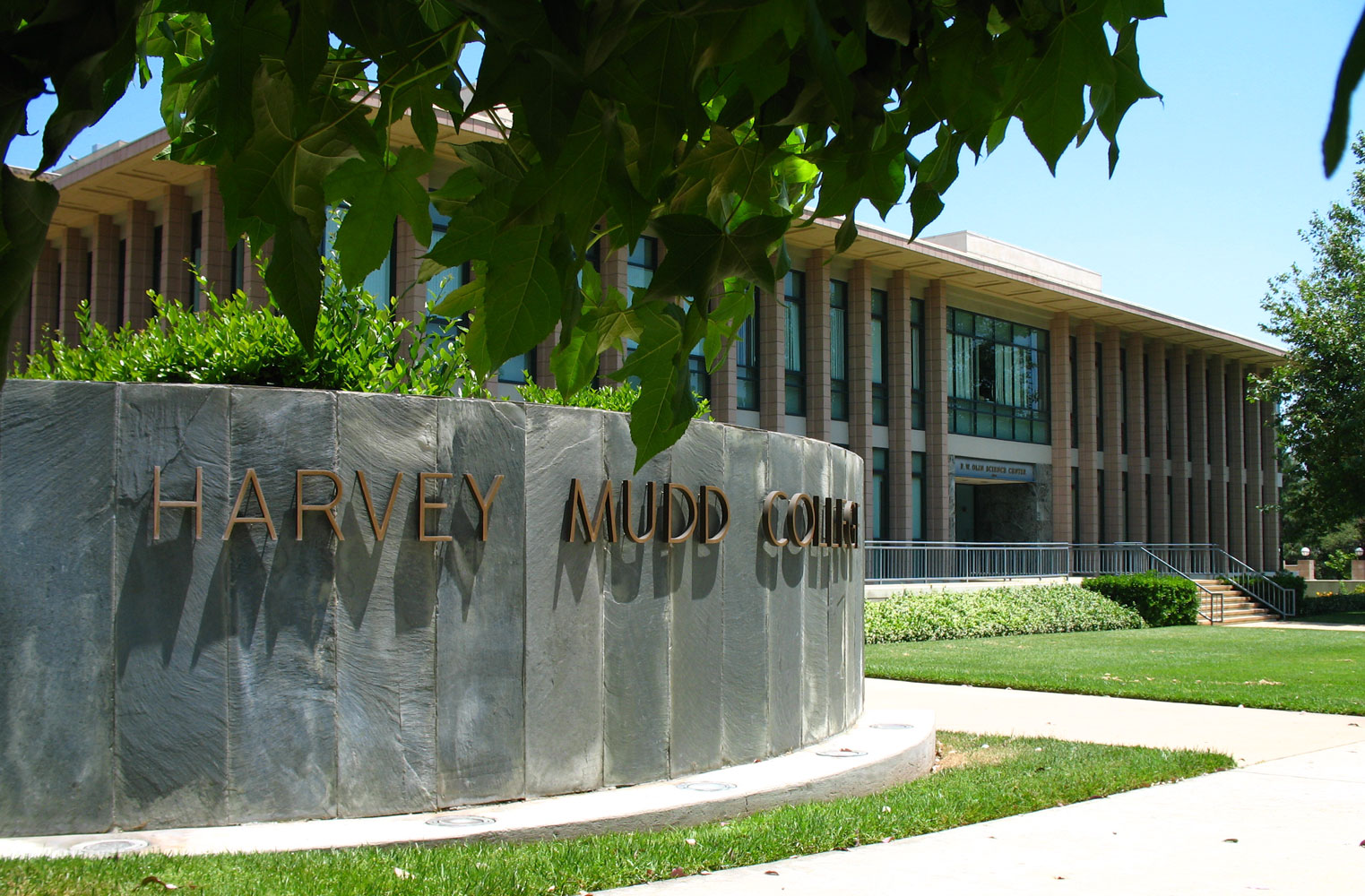
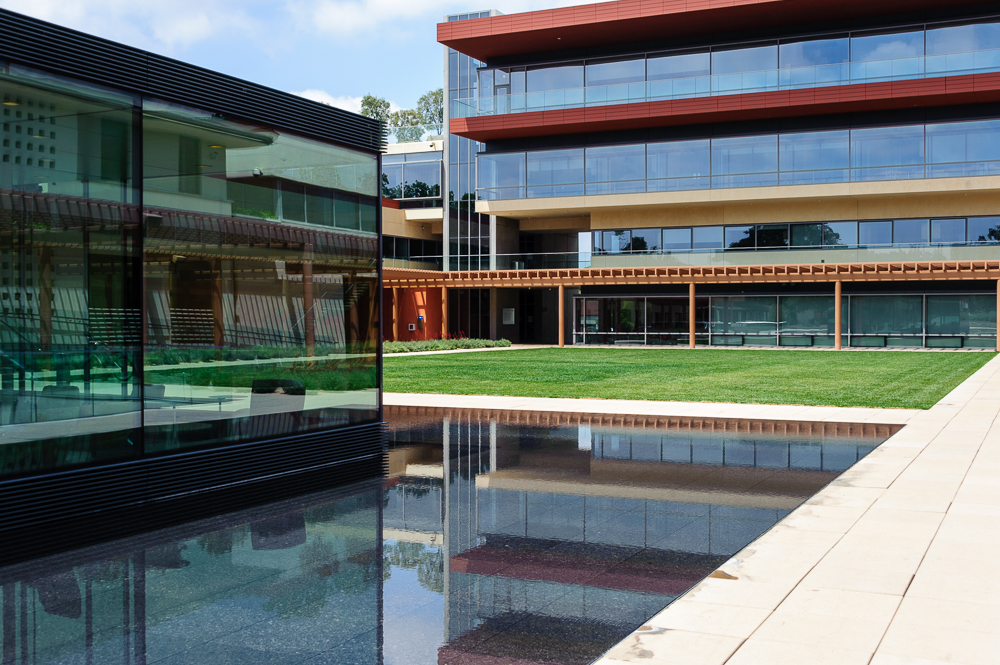
- (clockwise from top): Pomona College; Claremont Graduate University; Scripps College; Claremont McKenna College; Harvey Mudd College; Pitzer College; Keck Graduate Institute
- Former name: Claremont University Consortium (until 2017)
- Type: Private consortium
- Established: October 14, 1925
- Founder: James Blaisdell
- Endowment: $27 million (2019) (Note: Does not include the endowments of the member institutions.)
- Budget: $47 million (2019) (Note: Does not include the budgets of the member institutions.)
- CEO: Stig Lanesskog
- Students: About 8500
- Location: Claremont, California, United States; 34°06′09″N 117°42′45″W
- Campus: Suburban, 546 acres (221 ha)
- Nicknames: Pomona-Pitzer Sagehens; Claremont-Mudd-Scripps Stags and Athenas
- Sporting affiliations: NCAA Division III – SCIAC
- Website: www.claremont.edu

The Claremont Colleges (known colloquially as the 7Cs) are a consortium of seven private institutions of higher education located in Claremont, California, United States. They comprise five undergraduate colleges (the 5Cs)—Pomona College, Scripps College, Claremont McKenna College (CMC), Harvey Mudd College, and Pitzer College—and two graduate schools: Claremont Graduate University (CGU) and Keck Graduate Institute (KGI). All the members of the consortium, except KGI, have adjoining campuses, together covering roughly 1 mi^{2} (2.6 km^{2}).

The consortium was founded in 1925 by Pomona College president James A. Blaisdell, who proposed a collegiate university design inspired by Oxford University. He sought to provide the specialization, flexibility, and personal attention commonly found in small colleges, but with the resources of a large university. The consortium has since grown to roughly 8,500 students and 3,600 faculty and staff, and offers more than 2,000 courses every semester. Admission to the Claremont Colleges is considered highly selective.

The colleges share a central library, campus safety services, health services, and other resources, managed by The Claremont Colleges Services (TCCS). Among the undergraduate schools, there is significant social interaction and academic cross-registration, but each college maintains a distinct identity.

== Colleges ==
Map of the Claremont Colleges

The five undergraduate colleges are:

- Pomona College (founded 1887) is the oldest of the Claremont Colleges and the largest of the undergraduate schools. It is coeducational and offers majors in the arts, humanities, social sciences, and natural sciences.
- Scripps College (founded 1926) is a women's college. It offers an interdisciplinary curriculum with an emphasis on the humanities.
- Claremont McKenna College (founded 1946), was founded as Claremont Men's College and became coeducational in 1976. It specializes in political science, economics, finance, and international relations.
- Harvey Mudd College (founded 1955) specializes in engineering, mathematics, computer science, and the physical and biological sciences but also includes coursework in the humanities and social sciences.
- Pitzer College (founded 1963) is known for its experimental pedagogical approach and focus on social justice. Its curriculum emphasizes the social sciences.

The two graduate universities are:

- Claremont Graduate University (founded 1925) awards master's and doctoral degrees in 31 disciplines across seven schools.
- Keck Graduate Institute (founded 1997) is a biomedical graduate school, with schools of applied life science, pharmacy and health sciences, and medicine. It also formerly co-sponsored a remote four-year undergraduate program, Minerva Schools at KGI, which has since spun off as Minerva University, an independent institution no longer affiliated with KGI or with the Claremont Colleges.

The Claremont School of Theology (founded 1885) (and thus Claremont Lincoln University) is affiliated with the consortium but is not a member. In January 2024, after nearly a decade of litigation, the Claremont School of Theology finalized a deal to sell the 16 acres of prime Claremont Village real estate it had occupied since 1957 back to the Claremont Colleges for $7.7 million.

== History ==
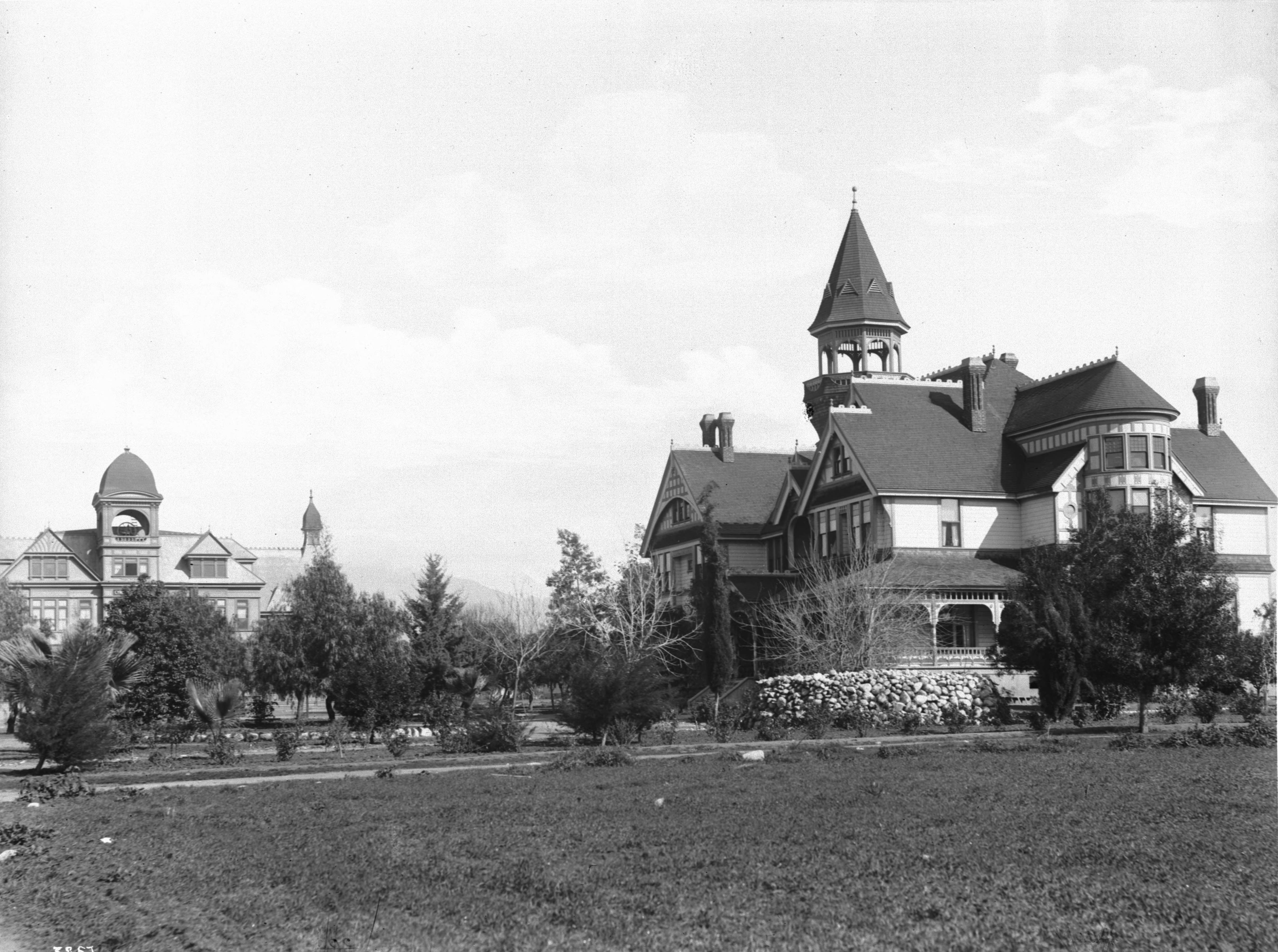
An exterior view of Pomona College in 1907, featuring its two earliest buildings: Sumner Hall (right) and Holmes Hall (left)

Before the idea of the Claremont Colleges, Pomona College was founded in 1887 in Pomona, California. Pomona began after a group of congregationalists envisioned a "New England-type" college on the West Coast. The college relocated to Claremont in 1888 after acquiring an unfinished hotel there. By 1923, Pomona College faced a problem: the school's population was growing. Pomona had to choose to either continue expanding or to limit the amount of growth at the college. The college's president at the time, James Blaisdell, developed a different option. He advised that the college choose to form a consortium of differentiated small colleges, modeled after Oxford and Cambridge. In October 1923, Blaisdell wrote to Ellen Browning Scripps describing a vision of educational excellence he had for the future Claremont Colleges:

I cannot but believe that we shall need here in the South [of California] a suburban educational institution of the range of Stanford. My own very deep hope is that instead of one great undifferentiated university, we might have a group of institutions divided into small colleges—somewhat on the Oxford type—around a library and other utilities which they would use in common. In this way I should hope to preserve the inestimable personal values of the small college while securing the facilities of the great university. Such a development would be a new and wonderful contribution to American education. Now the thing which would assure this future institution to Southern California is land ... It is now or never. To save the needed land for educational use seems to me to guarantee to Southern California one of the great educational institutions of America. Other hands through the centuries will carry on the project and perfect it. But never again can there come so fundamental a service as this.

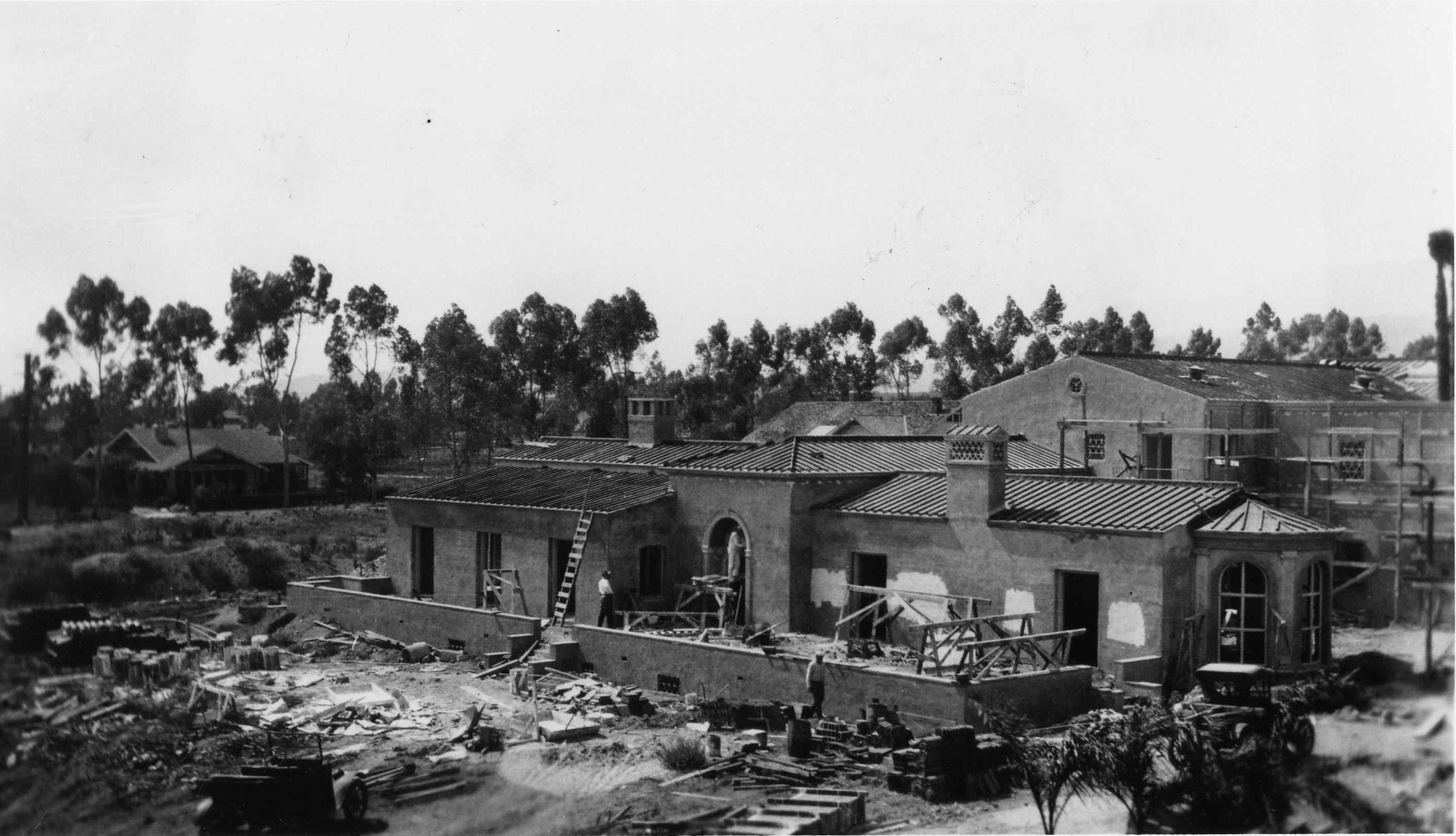
Construction of Eleanor Joy Toll Hall at Scripps, c. 1927

The start of the Claremont Colleges came in 1925 with the addition of a graduate school, now known as Claremont Graduate University. The college was originally known as Claremont College and began to function in 1927. The second addition came in 1926 when Ellen Browning Scripps founded Scripps College. Scripps College allowed Ellen Browning Scripps to put-forth her plan of a school which offered women access to a higher education, to better their professional careers and to better their personal lives. Scripps College officially opened in 1927.

The novelty of the arrangement, combined with marketing that drew up the perception of the West Coast as a novel frontier, led to nationwide interest in and praise for the colleges in the 1930s. Paul Monroe of Harvard University, the foremost educational historian of the era, wrote that year, "The torch of learning was borne aloft in the first century by Antioch and Athens; in the second century by Rome and Alexandria; by Padua and Paris in the twelfth; Oxford and Cambridge in the fifteenth; Harvard and Yale in the seventeenth; Columbia and Chicago in the nineteenth; the Claremont Colleges of the West in the twentieth."

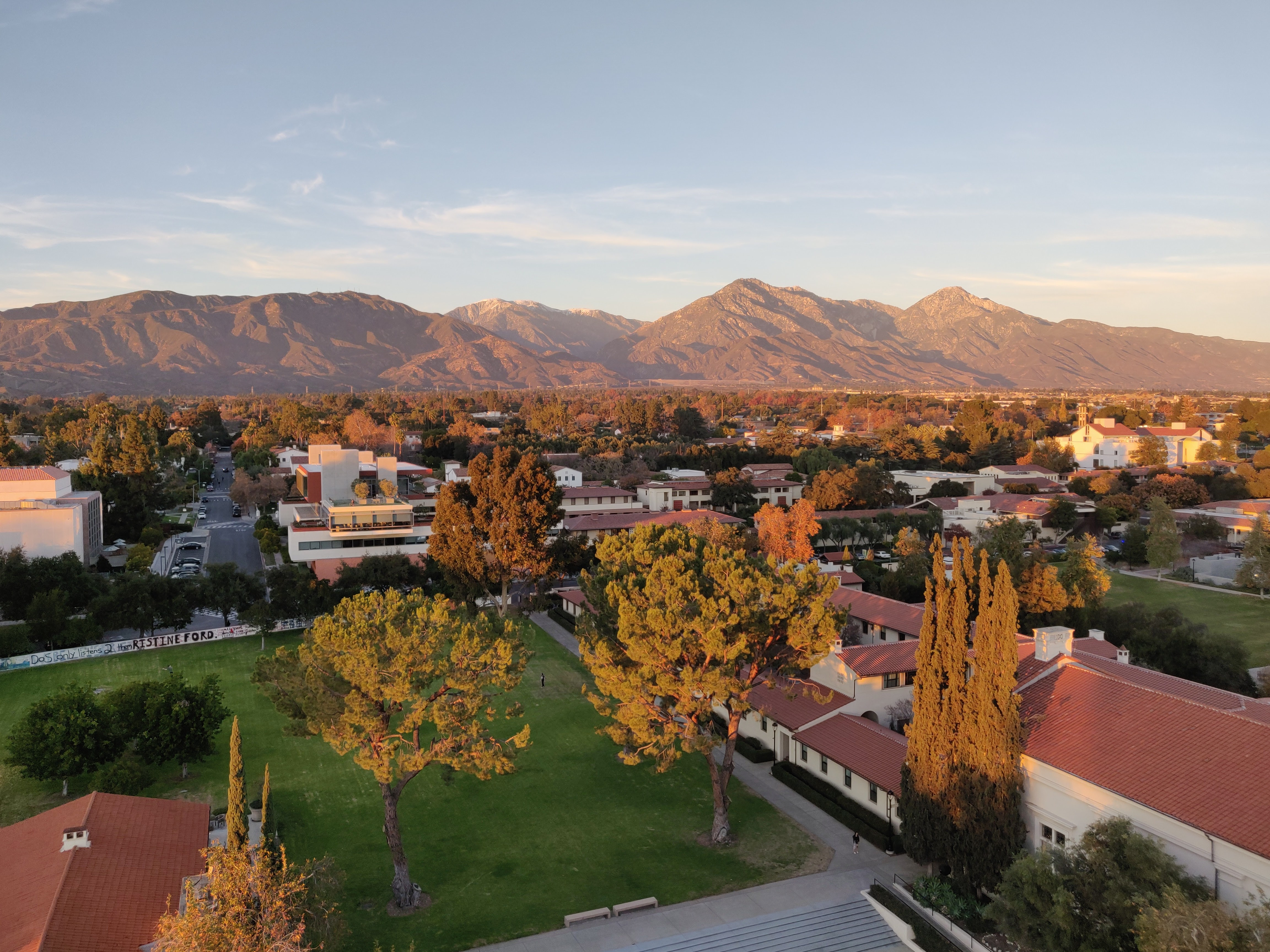
View of the Claremont Colleges in 2018, looking north from the Smith Clock Tower

In 1946, 86 students and 7 faculty members formed the fourth institution of the Claremont Colleges, the Claremont Men's College, now known as Claremont McKenna College. CMC was formed as a fully male undergraduate school until women were admitted in 1976. In 1955, Harvey Mudd College became the fifth institute in the consortium. HMC was founded by Harvey Seeley Mudd, a former chairman of the Board of Fellows of Claremont College. He envisioned an undergraduate college in the consortium that focused its education in science and engineering. In 1963, Pitzer College joined the Claremont Colleges. Pitzer was founded as a college for woman focusing on the social sciences. Later in 1970, Pitzer enrolled 80 men. The school was named after Russell K. Pitzer, an important benefactor in the development of the institution. The final and seventh college to join the consortium was Keck Graduate Institute. KGI was founded in 1997 after a $50 million donation from W.M. Keck Foundation. The graduate school focuses on post-graduate biomedical applications. Initially planned to be located on Bernard Field Station lands, protests forced the institute to relocate to a site southwest of the Claremont Village. Alongside the institutions, Claremont College Services was founded on July 1, 2000. The Claremont College Services provides educational support to all the institutions in the consortium. Specifically, TCCS aids in projects of group planning, establishment of new institutions into the consortium and hold expansion lands.

== Organization and operation ==
The Claremont Colleges employ approximately 3,600 people as of 2022. A report commissioned for the colleges estimated that the consortium had a regional economic impact of $706.8 million during the 2016–2017 academic year.

== Reputation and rankings ==
Admission to the Claremont Colleges is considered highly selective. The Fiske Guide to Colleges describes the consortium as "a collection of intellectual resources unmatched in America." According to the American Liberal Arts College rankings released by U.S. News & World Report in fall 2021, the "5Cs" were ranked among the top 35 liberal arts colleges in the United States: Pomona College (#3), Claremont McKenna College (#9), Harvey Mudd College (#29), Scripps College (#33), and Pitzer College (#33). Additionally, all of the undergraduate colleges are categorized as "Most Selective". Forbes ranked the 5C's among the top 60 undergraduate colleges (including universities and military academies) in the nation and within the top 25 liberal arts colleges for its 2017 report: Pomona College (#10 overall, #1 LAC), Claremont McKenna College (#11 overall, #2 LAC), Harvey Mudd College (#18 overall, #5 LAC), Scripps College (#43 overall, #16 LAC), and Pitzer College (#59 overall, #23 LAC). In 2025, Niche listed the top 3 liberal arts colleges in the United States as Harvey Mudd College (#1), Pomona College (#2), and Claremont McKenna College (#3). U.S. News & World Report also releases individual graduate program rankings for the Claremont Graduate University, with several of its programs ranking in the top tier of graduate programs nationwide.

== Shared facilities, programs, and resources ==
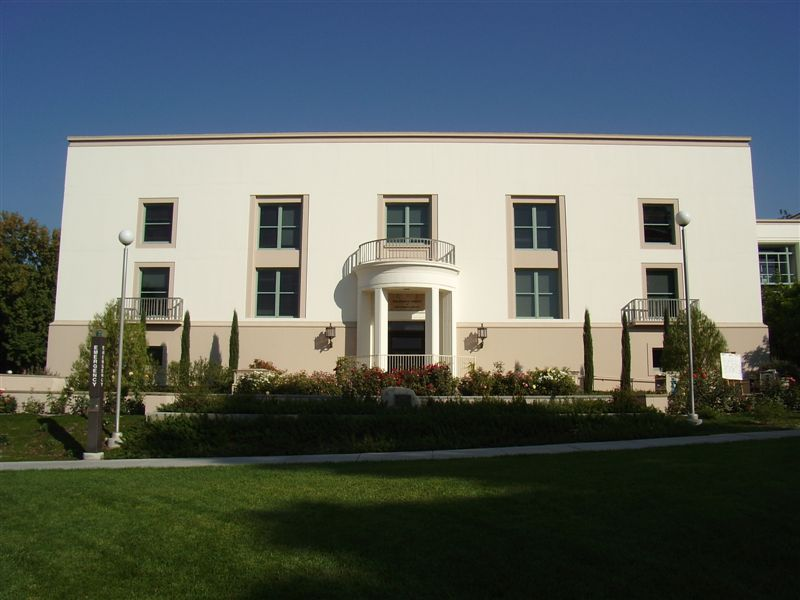
Honnold Library

Each college is independent in that students receive their degrees from the one college in which they are enrolled, and administration and admissions departments are independent. The seven-institution Claremont Colleges system is supported by The Claremont Colleges Services (TCCS), which provides centralized services, such as a library, student health, financial and human resources, telecommunications, risk management, real estate, physical plant maintenance, and other services, for those colleges.

The Claremont Colleges Library (also known as Honnold/Mudd Library) holds more than 3.4 million items as of 2023, of which 1 million are physical and 2.3 million are digital.

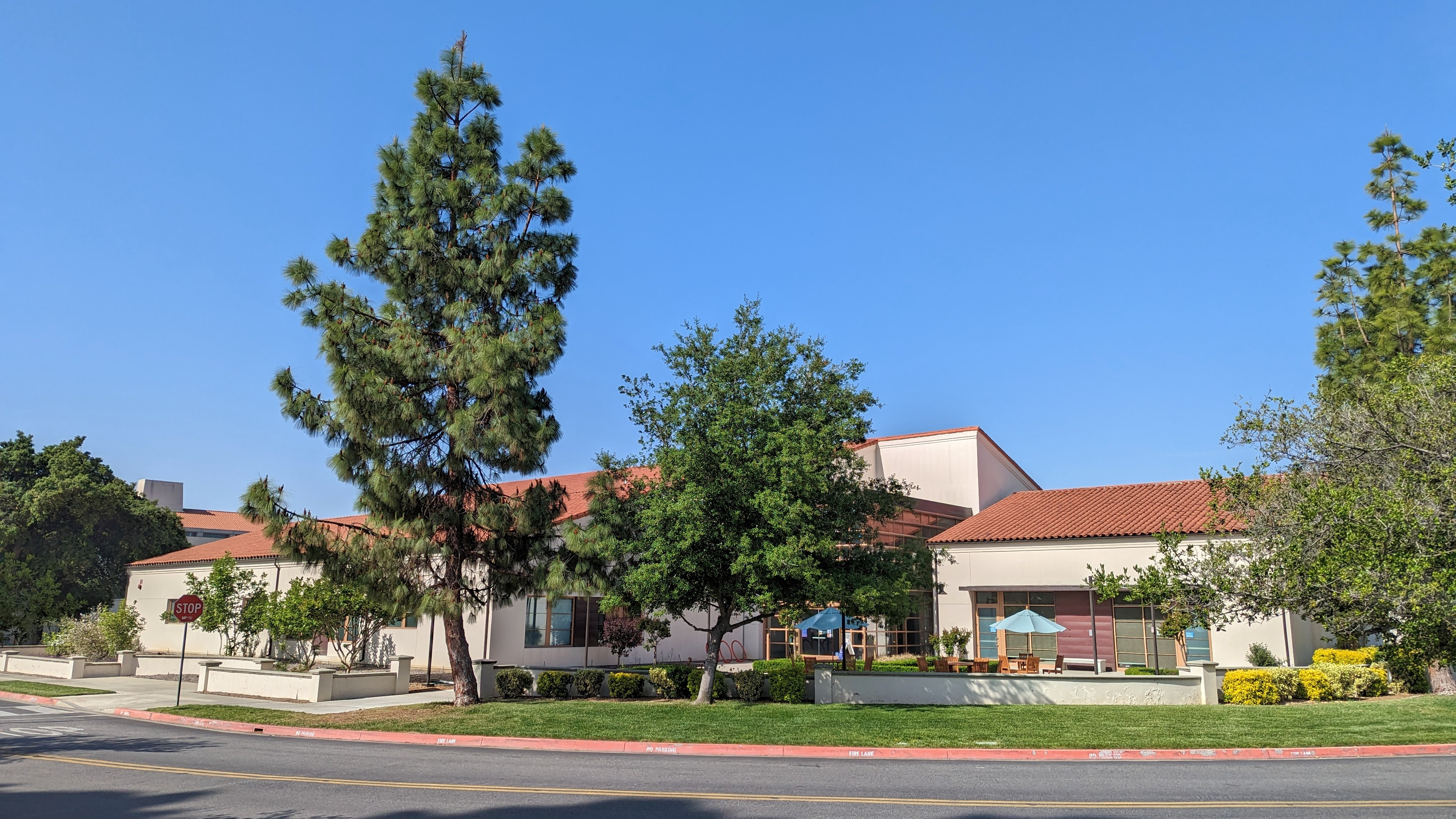
The Tranquada Student Services Center

Other shared facilities include Campus Safety, the Tranquada Student Services Center (which houses Baxter Medical Center, Monsour Counseling Center, and the Health Education Outreach), McAlister Center (home of the Office of the Chaplains and the Claremont Card Center), EmPOWER Center (which works to address sexual violence), the Huntley Bookstore, all dining facilities, and several sports facilities. The Sontag Center for Collaborative Creativity, colloquially termed "the Hive", was established in 2015 to support creative learning. The Claremont Colleges Library is an example of the level of cooperation in terms of support services. The size of the library collection ranks third among the private institutions in California, behind only Stanford and USC.

Shared academic departments include the Intercollegiate Women's Studies Center, the Intercollegiate Department of Chicano Studies, the Intercollegiate Department of Asian American Studies, the Intercollegiate Department of Africana Studies (formerly Black Studies), the Intercollegiate Department of Religious Studies, the Intercollegiate Department of Media Studies, and the Five-College Theater Department. In January 2008, the Claremont Colleges also formed the Claremont Center for the Mathematical Sciences, which is led by the Claremont Graduate University and is a collaborative center for faculty members working in mathematics.

Shared intercollegiate programs include the European Union Center of California, the Chicano/Latino Student Affairs Center, the Office of Black Student Affairs, the Office of the Chaplains, Hillel, and the Queer Resource Center.

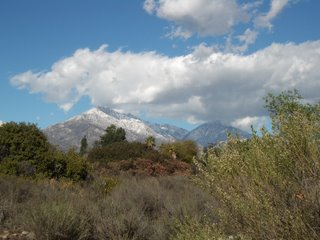
Bernard Field Station, with the San Gabriel Mountains in the background

In addition, Pitzer College and Scripps College share a single science program, the Department of Natural Sciences. Many research projects and courses use the Robert J. Bernard Field Station, an 86-acre (35 ha) natural area which consists principally of the rare Coastal Sage Scrub ecosystem. Since 2024, the Bernard Field Station has been home to the FLUXNET site US-BFS.

The Claremont Colleges have been praised by higher education experts for their high level of cooperation and the overall success of their model, although the colleges' differing financial resources have led to occasional tensions. They have influenced the operations of other consortia and collegiate universities, but their model remains unique with few other institutions operating comparably.

=== Clubs and organizations ===
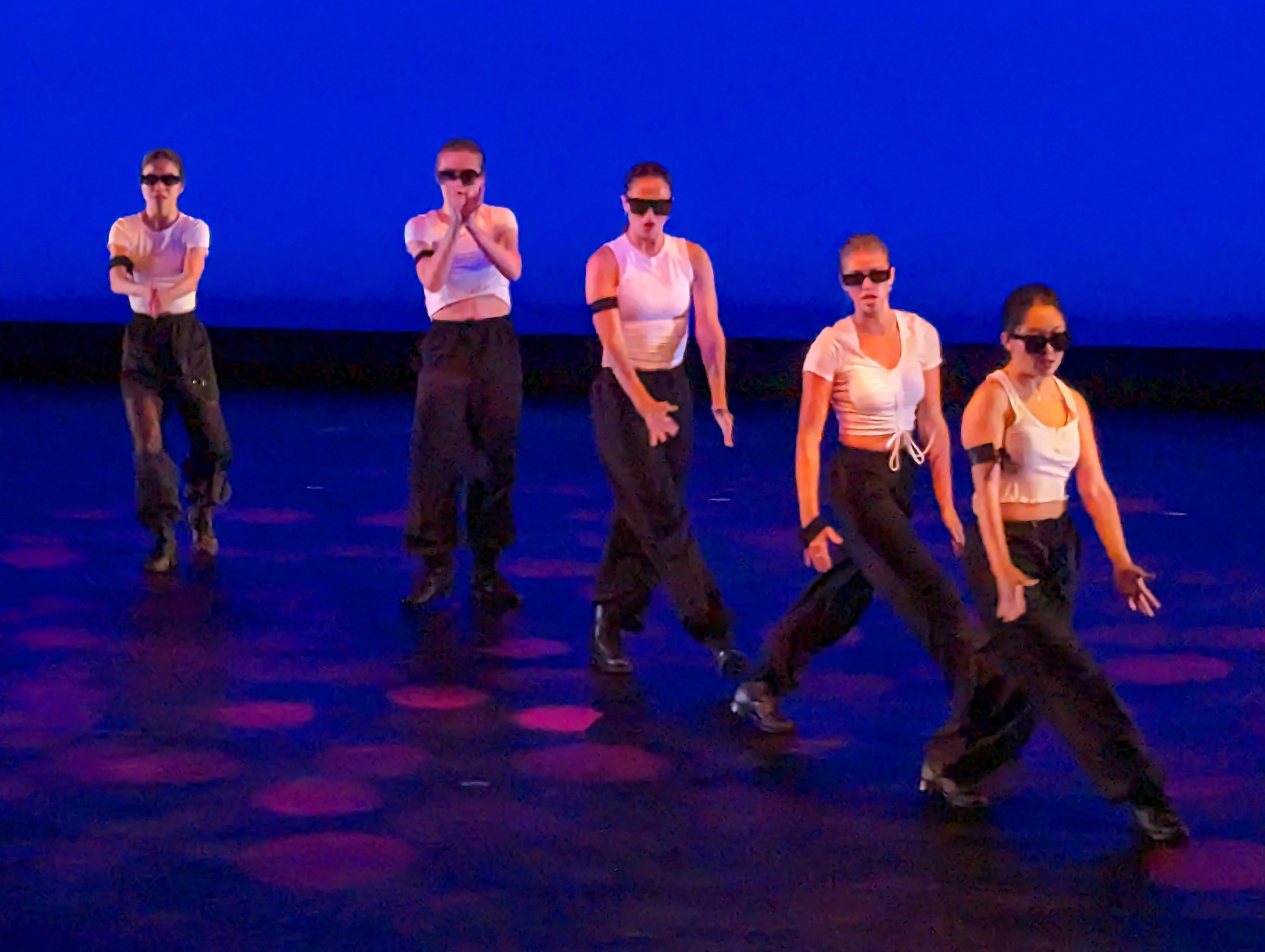
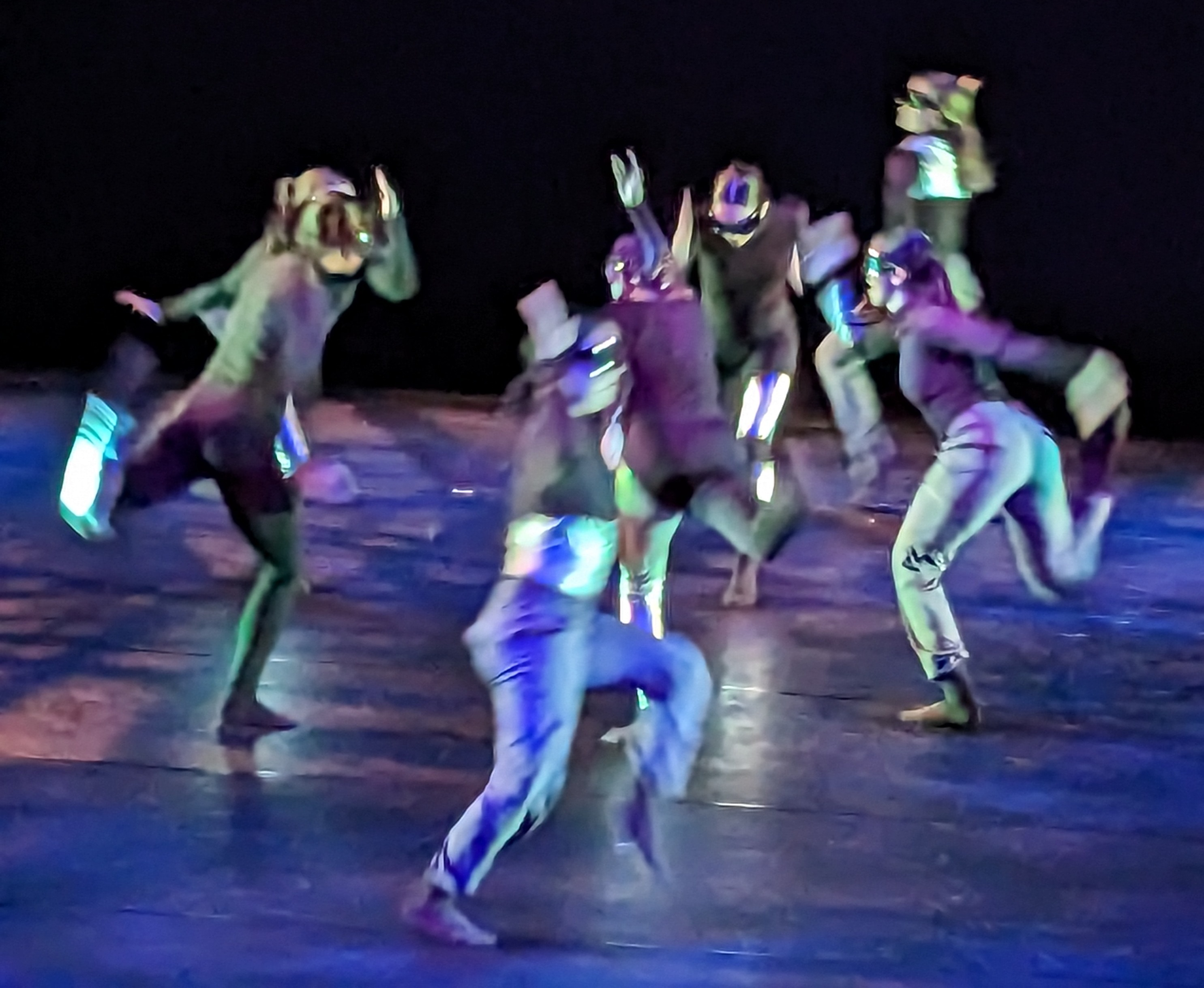
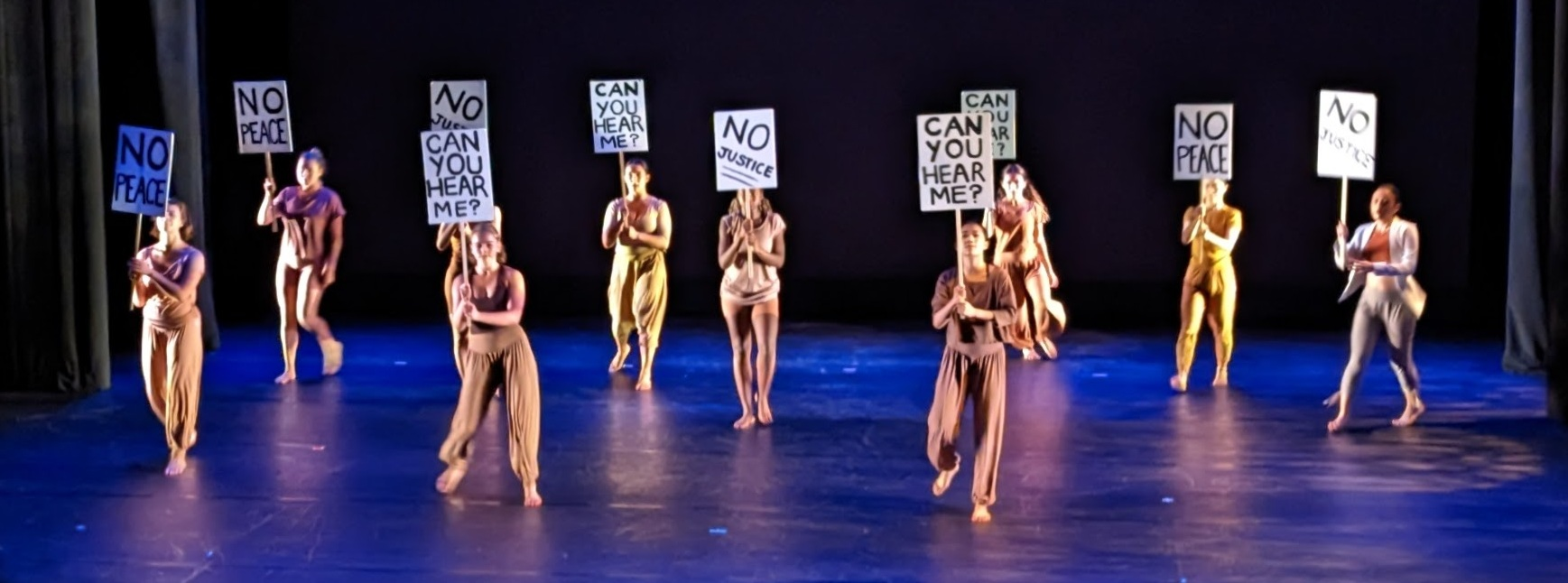
Scenes from a Pomona spring dance concert

Some extracurricular organizations on campus are specific to an individual college, whereas others are open to students at all 5Cs or 7Cs. In total, there are nearly 300 clubs and organizations across the 5Cs.

There are several media organizations at the Claremont Colleges, the largest of which is The Student Life, the oldest college newspaper in Southern California. It publishes a weekly print edition as well as online content. The college-specific newspapers Scripps Voice, CMC Forum, and Muddraker cover their home institutions. Pomona also has a student-run radio station, KSPC. The Claremont Independent, a conservative magazine, has produced articles about the 5Cs' political culture that have been picked up by national conservative media outlets and drawn criticism from many students. The Golden Antlers publishes satirical content.

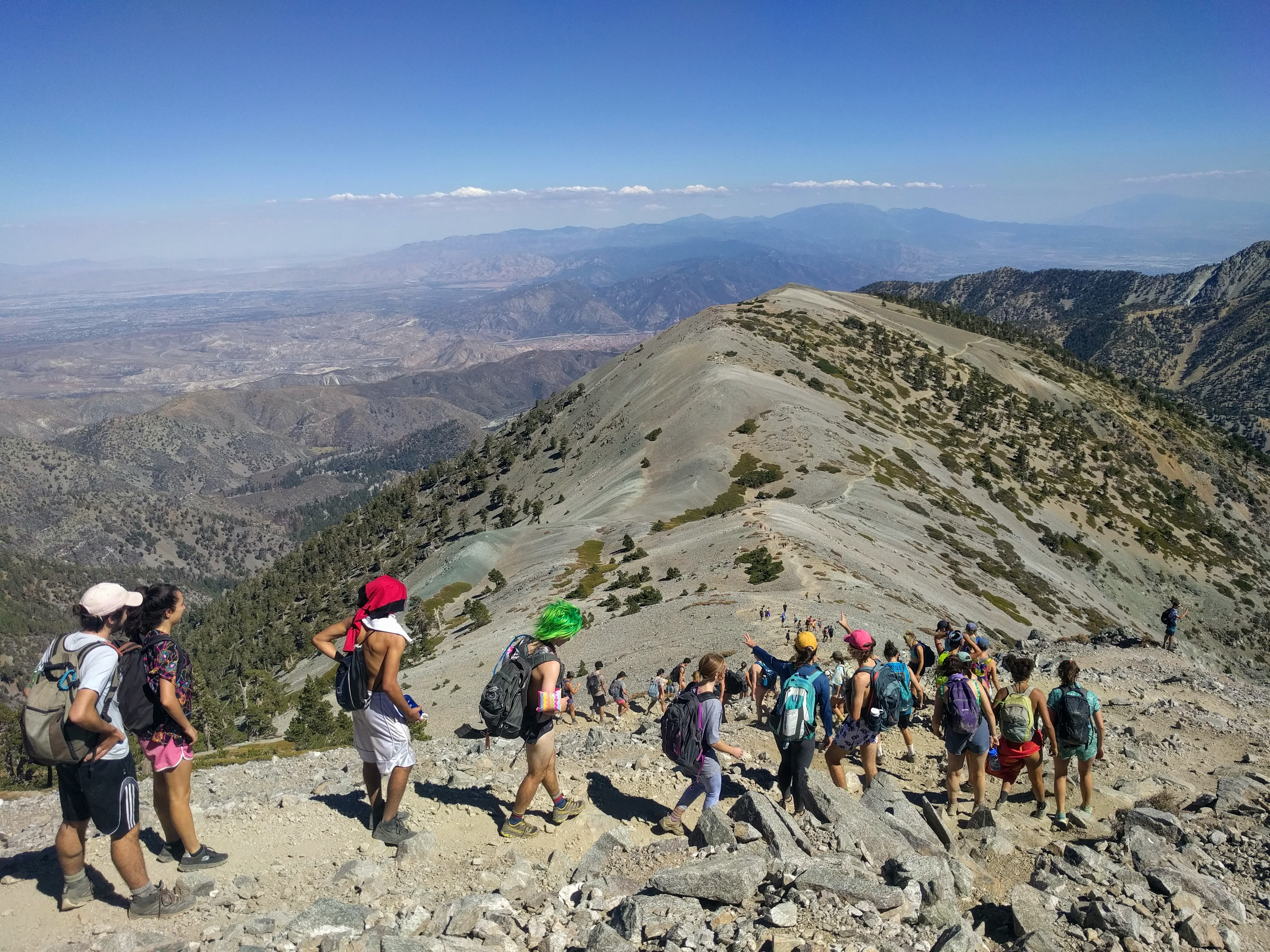
An On the Loose hike descends from the summit of Mount Baldy toward the Devil's Backbone ridge in the San Gabriel Mountains north of campus.

On the Loose (OTL), the outing club of the 5Cs, sponsors trips to outdoors destinations. Its flagship event, an annual hike up Mount Baldy in swimwear or goofy costumes, can draw more than 100 participants. It is affiliated with the Outdoor Education Center of Pomona College (OEC), which lends equipment to students for free and provides outdoor leadership training.

There are several dance groups on campus, including the Claremont Colleges Ballroom Dance Company (CCBDC), which has more than 130 dancers, making it the third-largest collegiate program in the U.S. It has won multiple national championships. The Pomona College Theater Department produces four mainstage productions and a dance concert each year, and there are several smaller student-run productions as well. The 5Cs have two improv groups, Without a Box and Underground Theatrical Institution (UTI).

There are eight a cappella groups on campus. One, the Claremont Shades, hosts the annual SCAMFest concert, which draws singers from other Southern California colleges. Another, Midnight Echo, hosts the less extensive annual Human Symphony. The other six groups are the Ninth Street Hooligans, Blue & White, After School Specials, Earth Tones, Mood Swing, and One Night Stanza.

== Comparison of undergraduate colleges ==
	Pomona	Scripps	Claremont McKenna	Harvey Mudd	Pitzer
Students	1766	1137	1393	921	1242
Faculty	243	136	184	110	118
2021 endowment	$3.04 billion	$540 million	$1.22 billion	$443 million	$179 million
2016 cost of attendance	$68,790	$70,497	$70,523	$73,550	$70,025
Domestic white, non-Hispanic students	35.2%	52.9%	41.4%	33.9%	45.4%
Domestic students of color	47.3%	37.4%	36.2%	50.6%	38.4%
International students	11.5%	5.5%	16.9%	10.1%	10.9%
Receiving financial aid	56.1%	56.7%	45.5%	69.1%	42.1%
Male/female ratio	50:50	0:100	52:48	52:48	46:54
2018 acceptance rate	7.0%	24.1%	8.9%	14.5%	13.2%
2017 transfer acceptance rate	9.6%	N/A	2.5%	6.8%	13.5%
First-Year Admitted Yield	54%	34%	53%	36%	43%
Six-year graduation rate	93%	88%	90%	96%	83%
Retention rate	98%	92%	97%	98%	95%
Enrolled SAT 25–75% range	1370–1530	1284–1458	1340–1510	1470–1570	1310–1490
Enrolled ACT 25–75% range	30–34	29–33	30–34	33–35	29–32
Ranked in top 10% of HS class	94%	73%	82%	90%	63%
Ranked in top 25% of HS class	100%	91%	96%	100%	88%
Percent of classes under 10 students	18%	17%	8%	32%	15%
Percent of classes under 20 students	71%	80%	84%	58%	71%
Percent of classes over 50 students	0%	0%	2%	4%	0%

== People ==
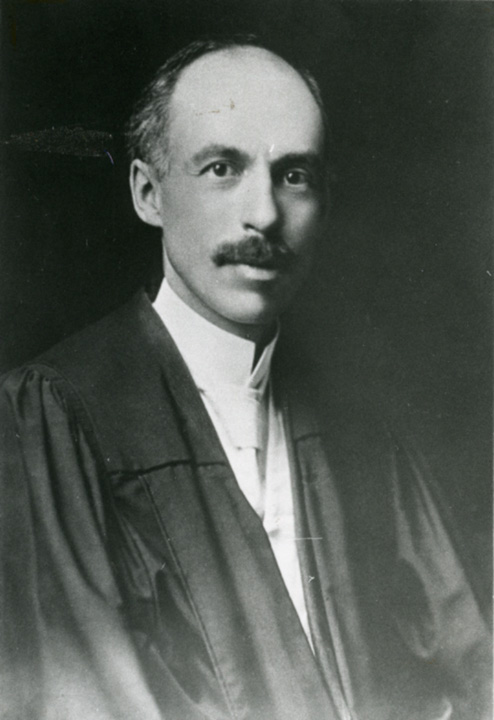
James Blaisdell, founder of the Claremont Colleges

Many notable people have been affiliated with the colleges as alumni, faculty, staff, and administrators. Coverage of them is divided into articles by college:

- List of Pomona College people
- List of Claremont Graduate University people
- List of Scripps College people
- List of Claremont McKenna College people
- List of Harvey Mudd College people
- List of Pitzer College people
- List of Keck Graduate Institute people

The CEO of The Claremont Colleges Services is Stig Lanesskog.

== Athletics ==
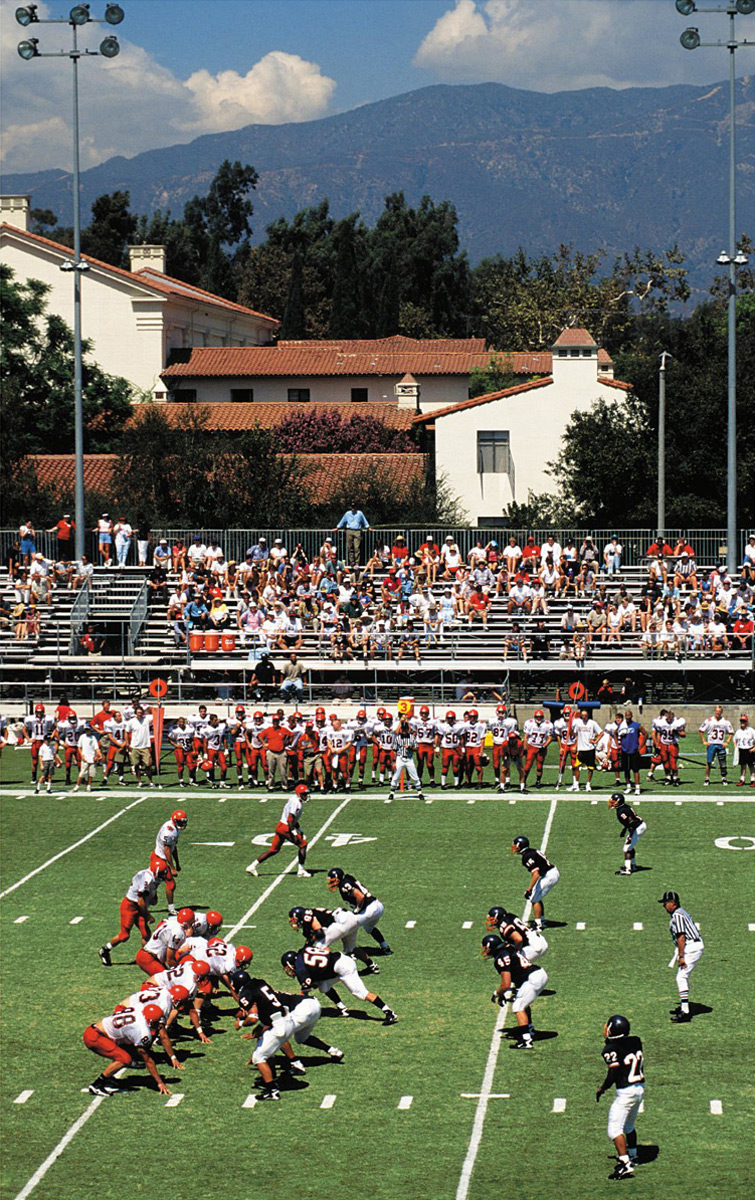
A Pomona-Pitzer football game

Pomona College and Pitzer College compete together as the Pomona–Pitzer (PP) Sagehens. Claremont McKenna College, Harvey Mudd College and Scripps College also compete together as the Claremont–Mudd–Scripps (CMS) Stags (for male teams) and Athenas (for female teams). The teams participate in NCAA Division III in the Southern California Intercollegiate Athletic Conference (SCIAC). In the Division III Final Standings for the 2016–2017 academic year, Claremont-Mudd-Scripps ranked fourth nationally, while Pomona-Pitzer ranked 29th; they were the top two performers in the SCIAC. Culturally, the Claremont Colleges place less emphasis on sports than many other institutions.

=== Club and intramural sports ===
In addition to the varsity teams, there are several 5C club sports teams.

The roller hockey club, the Claremont Centaurs, won the Division 3 Championship of the West Coast Roller Hockey League in 2009–2010, 2010–2011, and 2011–2012.

The men's and women's rugby union both attended Division II Nationals in 2004 and 2006, and the men's team (Claremont Colleges Lions) won the Division II national championship in 2010 and the National Small College championship in 2017 and 2019.

The women's ultimate team reached Nationals in 2004, 2011, 2013, 2014, 2015, 2016, 2017, 2018, and won the tournament in 2012, and the men's ultimate frisbee were 2008 Southern California Sectional champions and 2011 Division III National champions.

Other club sports offered at the 5Cs include men's lacrosse, field hockey, crew, and cycling.

== Bibliography ==
- Bernard, Robert J. (1982). An Unfinished Dream: A Chronicle of the Group Plan of The Claremont Colleges. Claremont, California: Claremont University Center. OCLC 9199564.
- A Brief History of the Group Plan of the Claremont Colleges. Claremont, California: Claremont University Center. 1993.
- Clary, William W. (1970). The Claremont Colleges: A History of the Development of the Claremont Group Plan. Claremont, California: Claremont University Center. OCLC 125108.
- Duke, Alex (1996). "Claremont: The 'Oxford Plan of the Pacific'". Importing Oxbridge: English Residential Colleges and American Universities. New Haven, Connecticut: Yale University Press. pp. 125–143. ISBN 9780300067613.
- Fiske, Edward B. (July 6, 2021). Fiske Guide to Colleges 2022 (38th ed.). Naperville, Illinois: Sourcebooks. pp. 146–147, 154–156. ISBN 978-1-4926-6498-7.
- Thelin, John R. (July 1, 1977). "California and the Colleges". California Historical Quarterly. 56 (2): 140–163. doi:10.2307/25157701. ISSN 0097-6059. JSTOR 25157701.
- Yale Daily News staff (July 1, 2014). The Insider's Guide to the Colleges (41st ed.). New York: St. Martin's Press. pp. 314–358. ISBN 978-1-4668-4835-1.
