= Cai =

Cai or CAI may refer to:

== Places ==
- Cai (state), a state in ancient China
- Caí River, Rio Grande do Sul, Brazil
- Cái River, Vietnam
- Cairo International Airport (IATA airport code), Egypt
- Caithness (Chapman code), a historic county in Scotland

== Organisations ==
- Canadian Airlines International, a defunct Canadian airline
- Capitol Archaeological Institute, an archaeological institute, part of The George Washington University, US
- Central Asia Institute, a non-profit organization that promotes education in Central Asia
- Chartered Accountants Ireland, Ireland's largest accountancy body
- Christian Assemblies International, an Australian-based charity organisation and religious group
- Club Alpino Italiano, the Italian alpine club
- Coleraine Academical Institution, a school in Northern Ireland
- College of Anaesthesiologists of Ireland, a medical training body in Ireland
- Community Associations Institute, an influential trade association and special interest group
- Compagnia Aerea Italiana, parent company of Alitalia, Italy
- Confederation of Australian Industry, forerunner of the Australian Chamber of Commerce and Industry
- Content Authenticity Initiative, an association for provenance metadata
- Corendon Airlines (ICAO airline code), a Turkish airline
- Corpo Aereo Italiano, an element of the Italian Regia Aeronautica during the Battle of Britain
- WCAI, a group of NPR radio stations in Massachusetts, US

== Science and technology ==
- Calcium–aluminium-rich inclusion, a type of mineral
- Carbonic anhydrase inhibitor, in pharmacology
- Codon Adaptation Index, a measure of codon bias in protein-coding DNA sequences
- Cold air intake, of an automobile
- Computer-aided inspection
- Computer assisted instruction or e-Learning
- Computer-assisted language learning
- Conodont Alteration Index, an estimate of the maximum temperature reached by a sedimentary rock
- Controlled Auto-Ignition, a technology of internal combustion for reciprocating engines

== Sport ==
- Club Atlético Independiente, an Argentine football (soccer) team
  - Club Atlético Independiente (women), the women's division of the football team
- Comisión de Actividades Infantiles, an Argentine football (soccer) team
- Club Atlético Ituzaingó, an Argentine football (soccer) team
- Club Atletico Independiente de La Chorrera, a Panamanian football (soccer) team
- Club Atlético Independiente de Neuquén, an Argentine football (soccer) team

== Other uses ==
- Cai (name), Welsh and alternative spelling of the name Kai
- Cai (surname), a common Chinese surname
- Comprehensive Agreement on Investment, a proposed deal between China and the European Union
- Mesoamerican languages (ISO 639-2 and ISO 639-5 codes)
- Sir Kay (Welsh: Cai), a character in Arthurian legend

== See also ==
- Kai (disambiguation)
- CAIS (disambiguation)
