= Deborah Freund =

American academic administrator

Deborah Anne Freund is an American university administrator and academic specializing in health economics. She was the president of Claremont Graduate University from 2010 to 2015.

== Education ==
Freund received a Bachelor of Arts (BA) in Classics from Washington University in St. Louis in 1973, a Master of Public Health (MPH) in medical care administration in 1975, a Master of Arts (MA) in Applied Economics in 1975, and a PhD in Economics in 1980, the latter three degrees all from the University of Michigan.

== Academic career ==
Freund began her career at UNC Chapel Hill in 1985 and later took administrative positions at Indiana University Bloomington, Syracuse University, and Claremont Graduate University.

=== UNC Chapel Hill ===
From 1985-1988, Freund was the director of the Program on Health Economics and Finance at the Health Services Research Center, director of the PhD Program in Health Policy and Administration, and director of the Clinical Economics Training Program at the University of North Carolina at Chapel Hill.

=== Indiana Bloomington ===
Freund was vice chancellor for academic affairs and dean of the faculties, and vice president of the IU System on Academic Affairs. She also served as associate dean of Indiana University's O'Neill School of Public and Environmental Affairs, and was director of its Bowen Research Center.

=== Syracuse University ===
Freund started her appointments as Vice-Chancellor and Provost for Academic Affairs at Syracuse University in 1999 and also served as the distinguished professor of public administration and economics at the Maxwell School of Citizenship and Public Affairs.

At Syracuse, she was instrumental in developing a new reimbursement database and website with health care pricing information which reduced conflict of interest in reimbursement and led to an almost $100 million in settlements.

=== Claremont Graduate University ===
Freund was the first female president of Claremont Graduate University from 2010 to 2015. Prior to taking the post at Claremont, she was considered for Chancellor of UCLA. She was the sole candidate left in the search, but pulled out of final negotiations, mainly because her husband was not offered a faculty position at UCLA. She was also considered for President of University of Iowa.

In 2015, Freund joined RAND Corporation and was appointed to the Paul O'Neill Alcoa Professorship in Policy Analysis.

== Personal life ==
Freund is married to economist Thomas J. Kniesner and the couple has one son, William Freund Kniesner.
