= William W. Clary =

American lawyer and academic

William Webb Clary (1888 – October 12, 1971) was an American lawyer and academic. He was a partner with O'Melveny & Myers and was involved with the administration of the Claremont Colleges consortium, including a stint as acting president of Claremont University College (later renamed Claremont Graduate University) in 1963.
