= Kei (ritual gong) =

Gong used in Japanese Buddhist practices

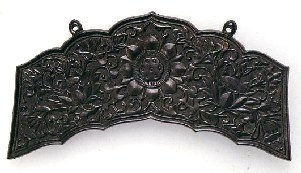
A kei from the Zenrin-ji in Kyoto

A kei (Japanese: 磬, Hepburn: kei) is a gong used in Buddhist practice in Japan. Kei were adapted from the ancient Chinese instrument known in English as a "sounding stone"; they share the same Chinese character.
