= Kye Hill =

Coordinates: 57.422°N 2.861°W

Kye Hill is a hill by Huntly, Aberdeenshire, Scotland. It lies southwest of The Clashmach hill and is nearly the same height. There is a former limestone quarry on the north side. The name originated from it being a favourite grazing place of the cows belonging to the surrounding farmers, "kye" being Scots language for "cows".
