= Chemical Agent Identification Set =

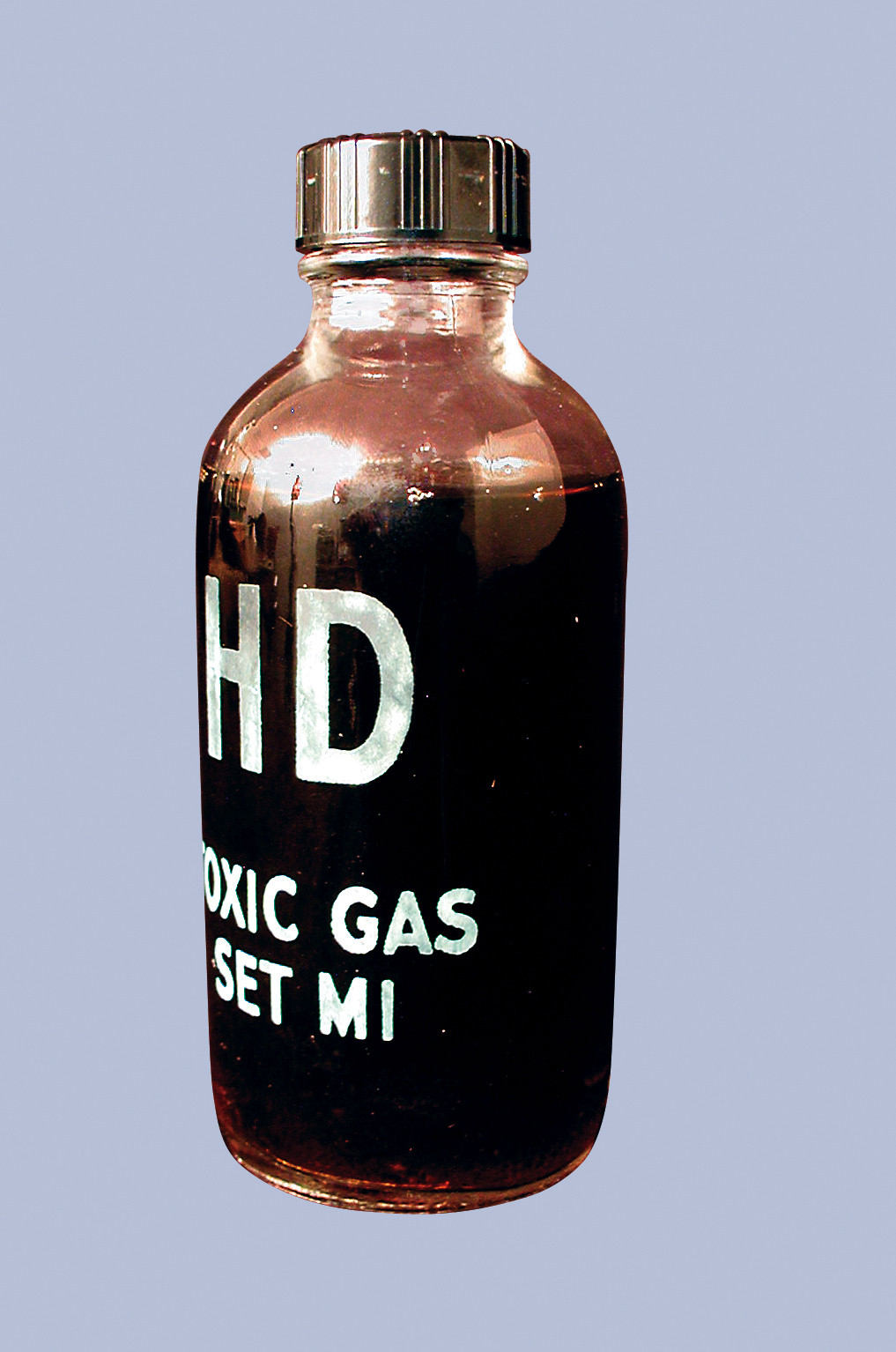
A typical glass bottle from a type of CAIS known as a "toxic gas set". This one contains sulfur mustard (HD).

Chemical Agent Identification Sets (CAIS), known by several other names, these sets typically consisted of glass vials or bottles containing small quantities of chemical agents and were employed across all branches of the military-United States Armed Forces from 1928–1969 to provide instruction in the detection, handling, and identification of chemical warfare. While most CAIS were destroyed in the 1980s, a number of sets remained buried or forgotten in storage. The U.S. Army Chemical Materials Agency continues to occasionally demilitarize CAIS units that are discovered, particularly those unearthed during construction or environmental remediation projects.

== History ==
=== Nomenclature ===
Throughout the military's use of CAIS they were known by several different common names aside from Chemical Agent Identification Sets. The other names were: Toxic Gas Sets, Chemical Agent Identification Training Sets, Instructional War Gas Identification Sets, Detonation War Gas Identification Sets, and Instructional Gas Identification Replacement Sets.

=== General history ===
CAIS were used by all branches of the United States military for training in detection, handling and familiarization with chemical warfare agents between the 1930s and 1960s. The U.S. Army used CAIS to train its soldiers from 1928 until 1969. During this time period more than 100,000 CAIS units were produced by all branches of the military. CAIS were declared obsolete in 1971 and systematically recalled from military installations during two operations. The first recall operation, Operation Set Consolidation I (SETCON I), was in 1978; SETCON II followed on in 1980.

== Specifications ==
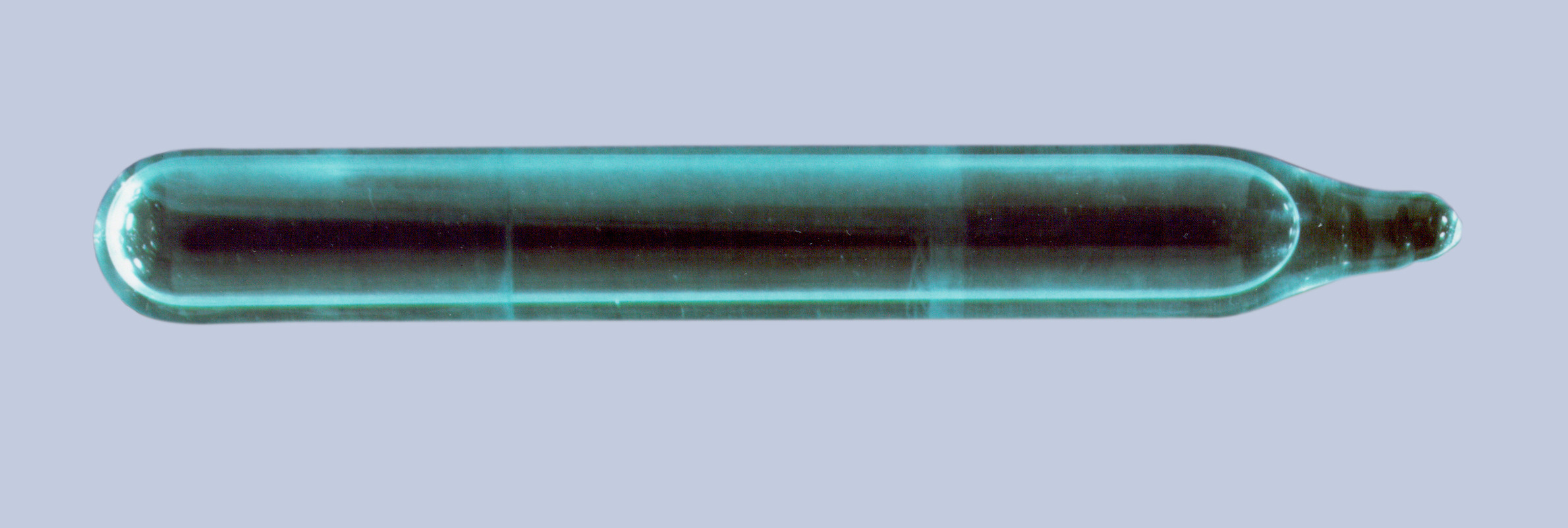
An example of a glass ampule found in Chemical Agent Identification Sets

Chemical Agent Identification Sets were small glass vials, ampules or bottles which contained small amounts of chemical warfare agents or industrial chemicals. Each set contained more than two dozen glass ampules, each ampule contained about 100 milliliters of chemical agent. There were three subsets of CAIS, distributed in 18 different set configurations. These subsets included bottles of sulfur mustard used to purposely contaminate equipment or terrain for decontamination training. Another type of CAIS were known as "sniff sets" and were used to train soldiers to recognize the color and odor of chemical agents. Used indoors, the sniff sets contained agent-impregnated charcoal and agent simulants; they contained very little actual chemical warfare agent.

== Chemical agents ==
Each of the CAIS held between one and five different chemical agents. The agents used in CAIS were phosgene, adamsite, lewisite, cyanogen chloride, chloroacetophenone, sarin, nitrogen mustard, sulfur mustard and chloropicrin. In addition, triphosgene, a phosgene simulant, and ethyl malonate, a tabun simulant were also used. Sarin was the only nerve agent used in CAIS.

== Disposal programs ==
Following the recall operations of the late 1970s and early 1980s, 21,400 CAIS were sent to Rocky Mountain Arsenal where they were destroyed by incineration. The destroyed CAIS represented the entire stockpile then in storage. This initial disposal took place from May–October 1979 and again from May 1981-December 1982.

Though the stockpile of CAIS were destroyed decades ago, there remained the problem of what to do with CAIS found buried underground. Most of the other 80,000 or so CAIS were used during training but some were disposed of, the primary method of disposal was burial. The U.S. Army Chemical Materials Agency was assigned the task of destroying CAIS as they were found, usually through ongoing construction projects. Most parts of the CAIS can be disposed of as hazardous waste, but the concentrated mustard agent must be neutralized before it is shipped. The Single CAIS Access and Neutralization System (SCANS) is a handheld container for safely mixing the mustard agent with a neutralizing agent.
