= KIE =

KIE or Kie may refer to:

== Academics ==
- Key Information Extracted - Several abstracts of scientific papers, especially in PubMed start with this acronym.

== People with the given name ==
- Kie Kitano (北乃 きい; born 1991), Japanese actress, singer and gravure idol
- Kie Kusakabe (日下部 基栄; born 1978), Japanese judoka
- Kie Nakai (中井 貴惠; born 1957), Japanese actress
- Kie Nakanishi (中西 貴映; born 1995), Japanese badminton player
- Kie Tamai (玉井 希絵; born 1992), Japanese rugby union and rugby sevens player

== Places ==
- KIE, IATA airport code of Kieta Aropa Airport in Papua New Guinea
- Kiè, a town in Burkina Faso
- Kié-Ntem, is a province of Equatorial Guinea
- Kie, Friesland

== Other uses ==
- Kinetic isotope effect (KIE in chemistry)
