= Kai Restaurant =

Native foods restaurant in Arizona

Coordinates: 33°16′0″N 111°59′31″W

- Interactive map of Kai Restaurant

Restaurant information
- Location: Chandler, Arizona, United States

Kai Restaurant is a Forbes Travel Guide 5-star restaurant in Chandler, Arizona. It specializes in native regional cuisine of central Arizona with locally sourced heirloom ingredients, sometimes from the Gila River Indian Reservation. The menu is influenced by local Maricopa and Pima culture.

The restaurant has many accolades including being rated AAA 5 diamond and Forbes 5 star since 2009. It was the highest rated restaurant in the world according to Forbes for 3 of those years. Kai was ranked as the number 3 restaurant in the world by OpenTable in 2015.
