= Cais (surname) =

Cais is a surname. Notable people with the surname include:

- Davide Cais (born 1994), Italian footballer
- Jan Cais (1878–1950), Czech Roman Catholic priest
- Michel Cais, pilot-in-training
- Milan Cais (born 1974), Czech artist and musician
