= Know Your Enemy =

Know your enemy (or know thine enemy) is a saying derived from Sun Tzu's The Art of War.

It may also refer to:

== Music ==
- Know Your Enemy (Lȧȧz Rockit album), 1987
- Know Your Enemy (Manic Street Preachers album), 2001
- Know Your Enemy, an album by Behind Enemy Lines
- "Know Your Enemy" (Green Day song), 2009
- "Know Your Enemy" (Rage Against the Machine song), 1992
- "Know Your Enemy", a song by Hybrid from the album Morning Sci-Fi
- "Know Your Enemy", a song composed by Yoko Kanno from Ghost in the Shell: Stand Alone Complex O.S.T. 3
- "Know Your Enemy", a song by Killswitch Engage from Atonement

== Other uses ==
- Know Your Enemy (podcast), American political podcast
- Know Your Enemy: Japan, a 1945 American propaganda film
- "Know Your Enemy", a 2018 episode of Voltron: Legendary Defender

== See also ==
- "Know Thy Enemy", an episode of the television series The Vampire Diaries
