= Fiske Guide to Colleges =

American media company

The Fiske Guide to Colleges is an American media company that publishes, inter alia, descriptions, ratings, and analysis for more than 320 U.S. colleges and universities. It is the best-selling college guide in the United States, although it remains significantly less well-known than rankings such as the U.S. News & World Report Best Colleges rankings. It was begun in 1982 by Edward B. Fiske while he was the education editor of The New York Times, a position he held from 1974 to 1987.

== History ==
The guide was begun during Fiske's tenure at The New York Times as The New York Times Selective Guide to Colleges, but has since become independent and publishes through Sourcebooks. The initial publication of the guide was controversial because it included criticism of some schools, such as a college that had recently become co-educational that Fiske described as hostile to women. More recently, the guide has received praise from the media, with USA Today describing it as the best college guide available.

== Methodology ==
The guide's evaluations includes narrative descriptions of more than 300 selective colleges and universities of different types, reported from interviews with students and other sources. This distinguishes it from U.S. News and similar competitors, which rely on reputational surveys and other quantitative measures but largely defer to schools to write their own narrative descriptions. This results in a focus centered more around individual fit than comparative prestige. Fiske emphasizes that he produces ratings, not rankings, describing his work as analogous to restaurant reviews.

In addition to the descriptions, each school is rated on a one-to-five scale in three categories: academics, social life, and quality of life. As of 2021, the Fiske Guide no longer reports average SAT and ACT scores.
