= Paul Gray (information technology) =

Paul Gray (1930 – May 10, 2012) was an American information systems pioneer, and Professor Emeritus at Claremont Graduate University where he was the founding chair of The School of Information Systems and Technology. The School of Information Systems and Technology at Claremont Graduate University is the home of the Paul Gray PC Museum.

== Biography ==
Gray received a PhD in Operations Research from Stanford University in 1968.

He has been a member of the faculty at Stanford, Georgia Institute of Technology, University of Southern California, Southern Methodist University, University of California, Irvine, and Claremont Graduate University. Gray served as secretary of The Institute of Management Sciences from 1975 to 1979, vice president at large from 1983 to 1986, and president from 1992 to 1993.

Gray was the founding editor of CAIS, the Communications of the Association for Information Systems and served as editor-in-chief from 1999 to 2006. He is on the editorial board of CAIS and eight other journals.

In 1999, he was elected Fellow of the Association for Information Systems. In 2000, he was named Educator of the Year by EDSIG. In 2002, he was elected Fellow of the Institute for Operations Research and Management Science (INFORMS). In 2002, he received the LEO Award of the Association for Information Systems for Lifetime Achievement. In 2003, he received the INFORMS George E. Kimball Medal. In 2006, he received the Lifetime Achievement Award of SIGMIS.

Paul Gray, professor emeritus at Claremont Graduate University (CGU), died on May 10, 2012, from injuries suffered in a car crash. He was 81.

== Selected publications ==
Gray is the author of 13 books and over 140 professional articles. Books, a selection:

- Gray, P., Watson, H. J., King, W. R., & McLean, E. R. (1997). Management of information systems. Dryden Press.
- Negash, Solomon, and Paul Gray. Business intelligence. Springer Berlin Heidelberg, 2008.

Articles, a selection:

- Gray, Paul. "Group decision support systems." Decision Support Systems 3.3 (1987): 233-242.
- Gorgone, John, and Paul Gray. "MSIS 2000: model curriculum and guidelines for graduate degree programs in information." Communications of the AIS 3.1es (2000): 1.
- Ives, B., Valacich, J., Watson, R. T., Zmud, R., Alavi, M., Baskerville, R., ... & Whinston, A. B. (2002). What every business student needs to know about information systems. Communications of the Association for Information Systems, 9(30), 1-18.
- Gorgone, J. T., Gray, P., Stohr, E. A., Valacich, J. S., & Wigand, R. T. (2006). "MSIS 2006: model curriculum and guidelines for graduate degree programs in information systems." ACM SIGCSE Bulletin, 38(2), 121-196.
