= James A. Blaisdell =

American academic (1867–1957)

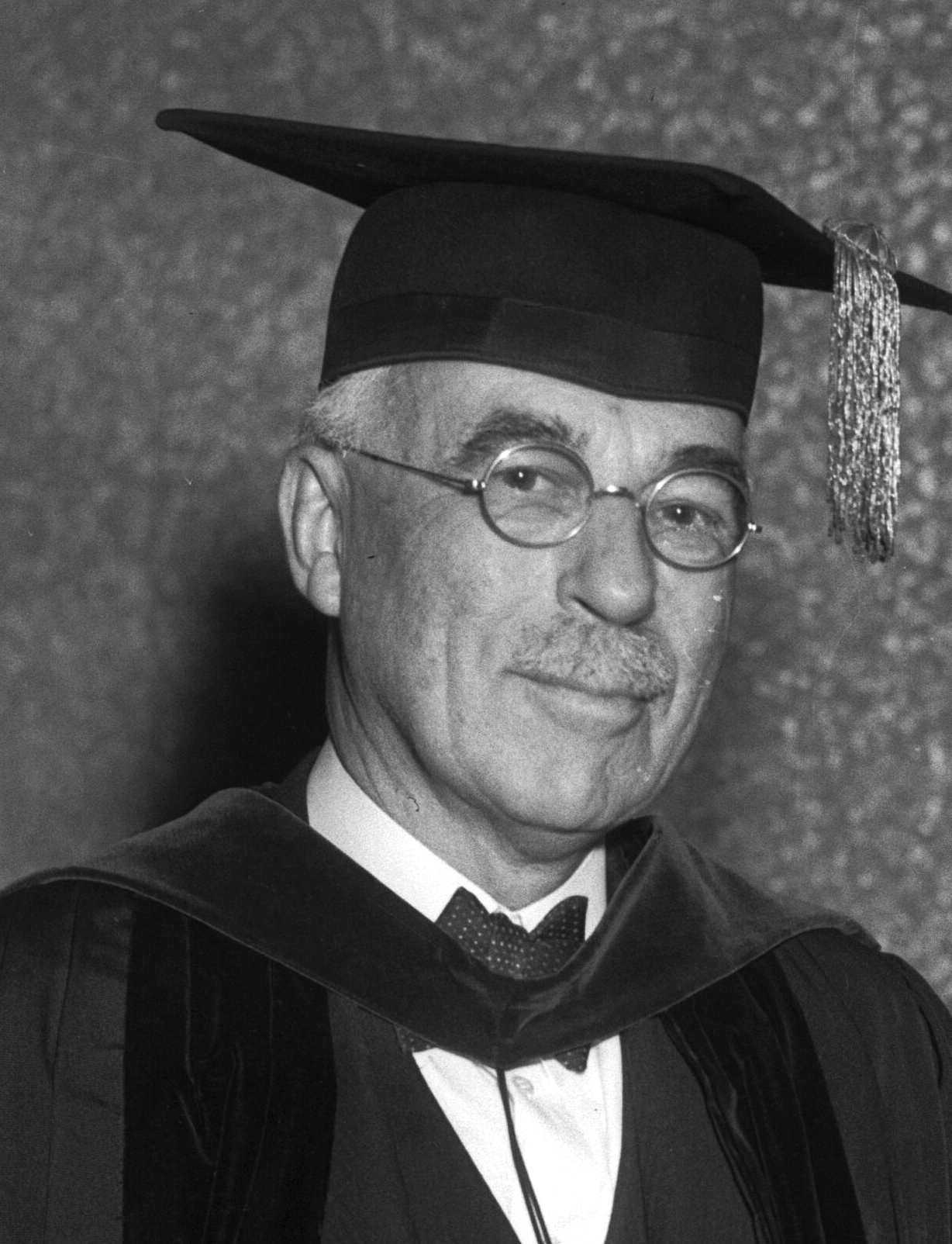
- Blaisdell in 1936

4th President of Pomona College
- In office July 1, 1910 – July 1, 1928
- Preceded by: George A. Gates
- Succeeded by: Charles K. Edmunds

Personal details
- Born: James Arnold Blaisdell; December 15, 1867 Beloit, Wisconsin
- Died: January 29, 1957 (aged 89) Claremont, California
- Spouses: Florence Carrier Blaisdell (died 1940) Anne Grassie Blaisdell (m. 1943)
- Children: 4
- Education: Beloit College
- Profession: Academic

James Arnold Blaisdell (December 15, 1867 – January 29, 1957) was an American minister, theologian, and academic administrator. He was the fourth president of Pomona College (1910–1927) and founder and "head fellow" of the Claremont Colleges (1927–1935).

== Life and career ==
He was born in Beloit, Wisconsin; his father was a philosophy professor at Beloit College. Blaisdell graduated from Beloit College in 1889, and went on to become a minister in Waukesha, Wisconsin for a time, until he went back to Beloit College to be the Chair of the Bible Department, as well as the director of the library, in 1903.

He became president of Pomona College in 1910 and the College’s finances, success and visibility quickly increased. He envisioned what would become the Claremont Colleges in 1923 when faced with increasing enrollment at Pomona, so that rather than compromising the small college’s atmosphere, several small schools could coexist and share common facilities such as a library, much like Oxford. He became the head of the Claremont University Consortium in 1927, when he resigned as president of Pomona. He continued in this capacity until 1935, retiring to La Jolla, California, but upon the death of his wife in 1940, returned to Claremont, California for the last 17 years of his life, observing and overseeing the growth of what had become five institutions.

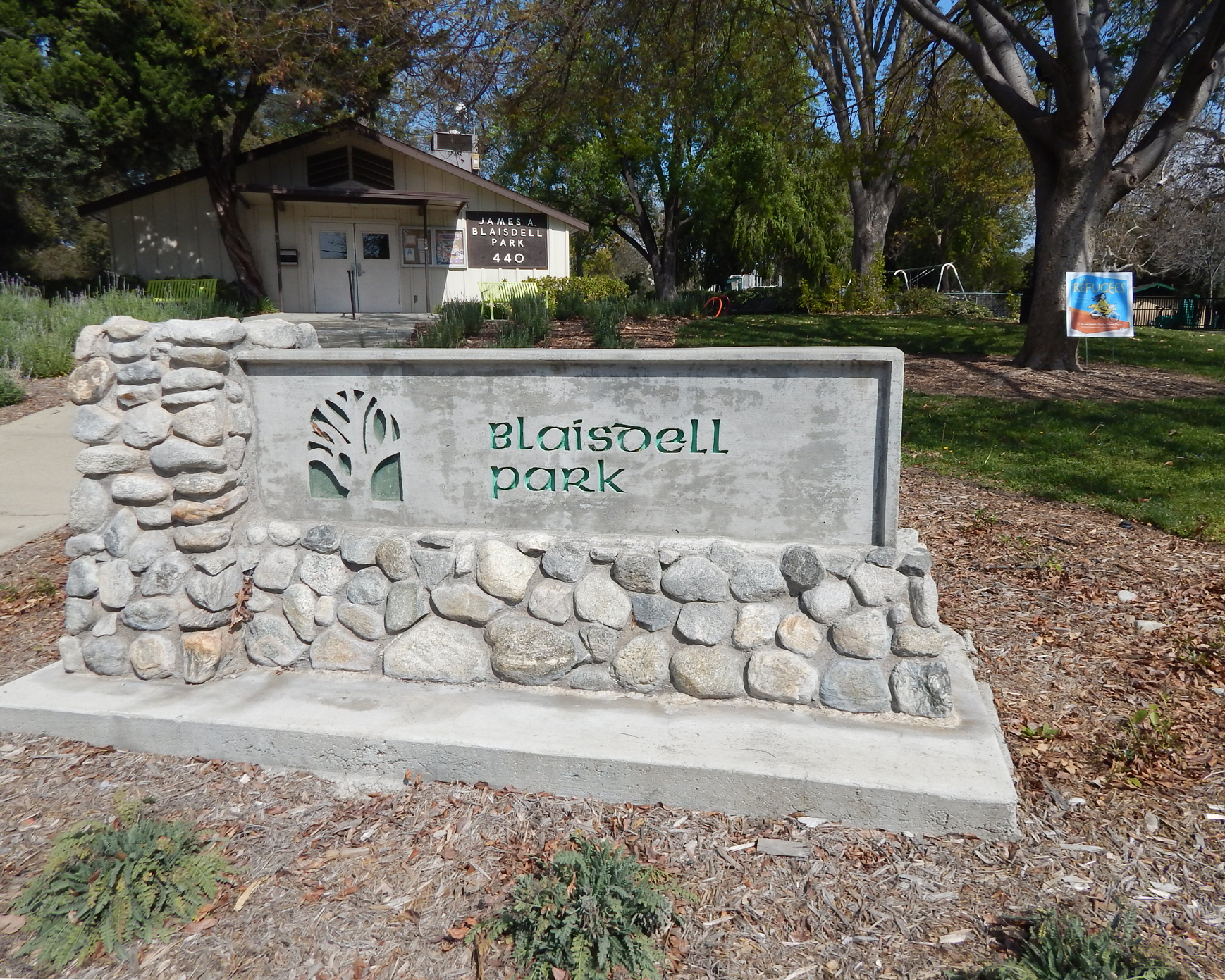
James A. Blaisdell Park, Claremont, California

Blaisdell was honored by the city of Claremont with the dedication of a public park in his name in 1962. It is located on South College Avenue. He is buried in nearby Oak Park Cemetery in Claremont.
