= Sharon Monsky =

American founder of Scleroderma Research Foundation (1953–2002)

Sharon Lynn Monsky
- Born: October 23, 1953; Omaha, Nebraska
- Died: May 11, 2002 (aged 48); Santa Barbara, California
- Cause of death: Scleroderma
- Spouse: Mark Scher (m. 1977)
- Children: 3
- Website: srfcure.org

Sharon Monsky (October 23, 1953 – May 11, 2002) was an American health activist who founded the Scleroderma Research Foundation.

== Early life ==
Monsky was born in Omaha, Nebraska on October 23, 1953. She was a competitive figure skater as a teenager.

Monsky received a BA in Economics at Pitzer College, where she also met her future husband Mark Scher. She received her MBA from Stanford University in 1980, while living in San Francisco and working on the Pacific Stock Exchange.

== Scleroderma Research Foundation ==
In 1982, while working as a management consultant for McKinsey & Co. Inc., Monsky was diagnosed with scleroderma and was told she had only two years to live. The rare disease hardens the skin and internal organs of young women of child-bearing age causing disfigurement, and is potentially fatal.

In reaction to the lack of awareness of the disease in the medical community, she went on to found the Scleroderma Research Foundation in 1987, an organization dedicated to finding a cure. According to the New York Times, "Ms. Monsky's activities generated more than $14 million for research and helped expand understanding of the disease. Money she disbursed for basic medical research on scleroderma led to the publication of scientific articles exploring potential cures. Her work also helped make scleroderma better known." Ms. Monsky applied her business expertise to successful fund-raising efforts. For example, she organized an annual fund-raiser which in 1992 combined top comedians such as Bob Saget plus fine cuisine which drew 420 people and netted donations of $125,000.

Monsky's friend actress Dana Delany said "Sharon's work literally convinced researchers that there was hope in finding a cure ... Before research can begin researchers have to be convinced there is a light at the end of the tunnel. Now we know it's a solvable problem held back only by research resources." In 1996, Monsky appeared in the ABC TV movie For Hope alongside Delany. Reflecting on her work, Monsky has stated, "I'm in the business of finding a cure for scleroderma...and the best thing of all is that I'm in the business to go out of business."

After living 18 years beyond the original prognosis, Monsky died on May 11, 2002, at age 48, due to complications from the disease.
