= Dana Delany =

American actress (born 1956)

- Delany in 2026
- Born: March 13, 1956 (age 70); New York City, U.S.
- Education: Wesleyan University
- Occupation: Actress
- Years active: 1974–present
- Known for: China Beach; Desperate Housewives; Body of Proof

Dana Delany (born March 13, 1956) is an American actress. After appearing in small roles early in her career, Delany received her breakthrough role as Colleen McMurphy on the ABC television drama China Beach (1988–1991), for which she received the Primetime Emmy Award for Outstanding Lead Actress in a Drama Series in 1989 and 1992. She received further recognition for her appearances in the films: Light Sleeper (1992), Tombstone (1993), Exit to Eden (1994), The Margaret Sanger Story (1995), Fly Away Home (1996), True Women (1997) and Wide Awake (1998). Delany also provided the voice of Lois Lane in Superman: The Animated Series, Justice League and Justice League Unlimited. Delany has the longest tenure of playing Lois Lane, having portrayed the character intermittently over a span of 17 years.

In the 2000s, Delany appeared in main roles on several short-lived television series, including: Pasadena (2001), Presidio Med (2002–2003) and Kidnapped (2006–2007). From 2007 to 2010, she starred as Katherine Mayfair on the ABC television series Desperate Housewives, for which she received a Prism Award in 2009. Delany then starred as Megan Hunt on the ABC medical drama Body of Proof (2011–2013), and as Crystal Harris on the Amazon Prime Video drama series Hand of God (2014–2017).

== Early life ==
Delany was born in New York City, the daughter of interior designer Mary Burnett Welles and John Joseph Delany, CEO of Coyne & Delany Co., a plumbing manufacturing firm. She has a sister, Corey, and a brother, Sean. She was raised Roman Catholic. She has stated that, even as a little girl, she always wanted to go into acting. "The reason a person first gets into acting is because you want attention from your parents as a little girl", she told a reporter. In her childhood, she went with her family to many Broadway shows and was fascinated by films.

After growing up in Stamford, Connecticut, she attended Phillips Academy in Andover, Massachusetts, for her senior year and was a member of the school's first co-educational class. Then-senior Delany wrote an op-ed in 1974 about her experience of being a one-year student during the school's first semesters of co-education. "Andover was the best time of my life", she recalled. She played the lead role of Nellie Forbush in the school's spring musical production of South Pacific opposite Peter Kapetan as Emile. She commented: "It was just a little awkward to be Nellie at first because she hesitates to marry Emile since he had once lived with a Polynesian woman – I don't agree with her reasoning so that made things a bit hard at the beginning". She appeared in a student video directed by classmate Jonathan Meath in a film class taught by Steve Marx. She graduated in 1974 with the academic honor of nomination to the school chapter of the Cum Laude Society, awarded that year to 80 out of 378 graduating seniors.

She majored in theater at Wesleyan University, where (among other productions) she appeared in one of the first performances of María Irene Fornés feminist play Fefu and Her Friends. Delany also worked summer stock productions during vacations before graduating in 1978. Later, in an interview, she reported that she sometimes had eating disorders during this time of her life. She said: "I binged... I starved... I was one step from anorexia – a piece of toast and an apple would be all I would eat in a day".

== Career ==
=== 1980s: Stage, television, China Beach ===
After college, she found acting work in New York City in daytime soap operas including Love of Life and As the World Turns, and supported herself by acting in commercials such as for Wisk laundry detergent. She starred in the Broadway show A Life and won critical acclaim in 1983 in Nicholas Kazan's off-Broadway Blood Moon, where The New York Times cited her "skillful verisimilitude" handling a difficult part requiring two roles "and she does them both with authority". Delany moved to Hollywood and during the next few years found work guest starring in TV shows like Moonlighting and Magnum, P.I. and Thirtysomething.

Delany's first audition for the lead role of nurse Colleen McMurphy was unsuccessful. "They thought I wasn't pretty enough", she said in an interview. She finally won the role when she showed up to her next audition with her "long tresses cut into a bob", after the producers lost their first choice (Delany had cut her hair at the request of director Paul Schrader, who had cast her in the film Patty Hearst). China Beach aired weekly from 1988 to 1991 and brought intense media attention to the actress. This role not only garnered two Primetime Emmy Awards, but two additional Primetime Emmy Award nominations and two Golden Globe Award nominations. The show ended after four seasons in 1991.

=== 1990s: Movies, television, voice ===
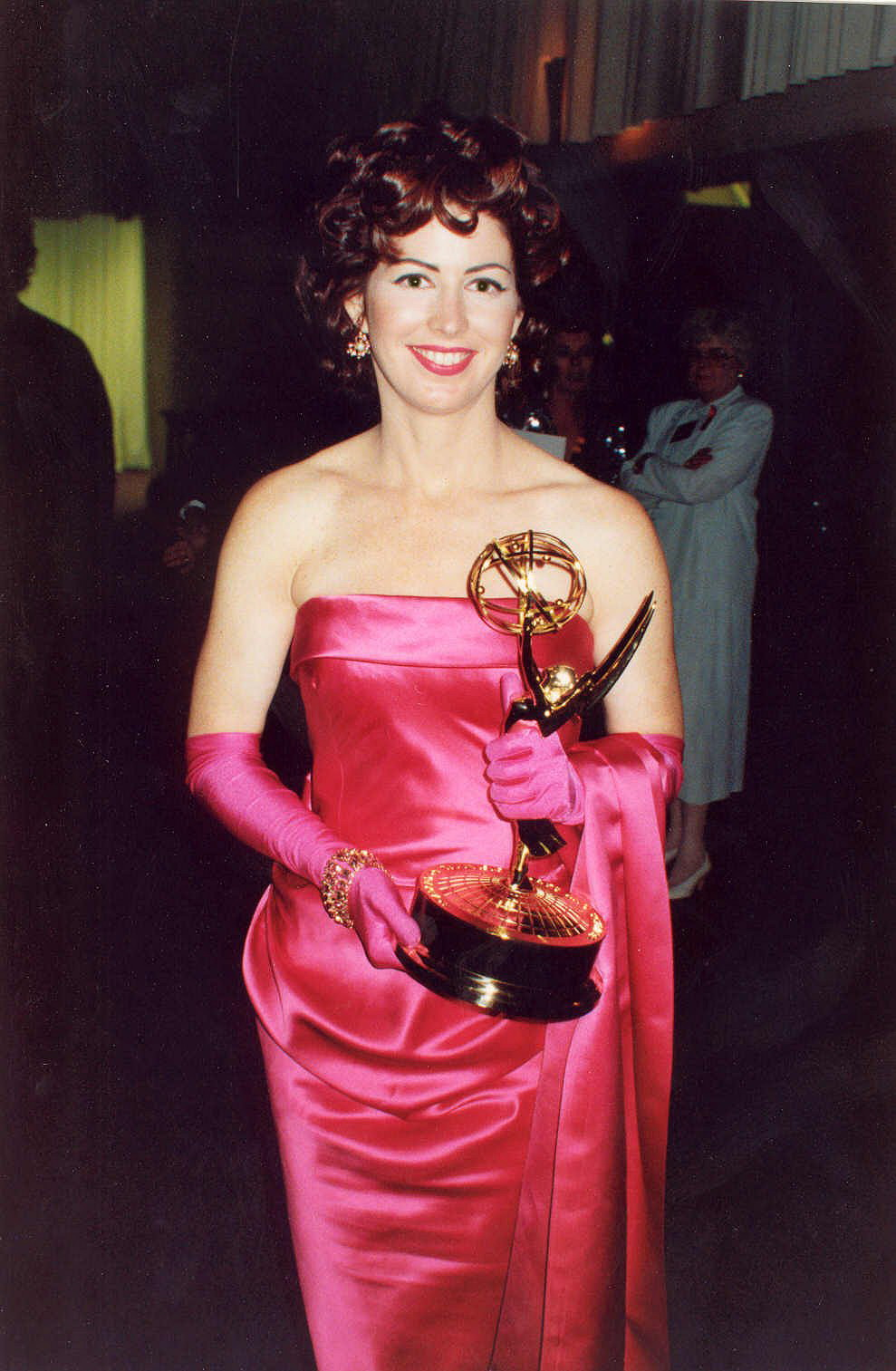
Delany at 44^{th} Primetime Emmy Awards, holding the award she won in 1992.

In 1991, Delany was chosen by People magazine as one of the 50 most beautiful people in the world. In the years following China Beach, Delany worked steadily in television, movies and theater. In addition, she established herself as a significant voice talent.

Delany won leading roles in a string of feature films such as the TV movie A Promise to Keep, Light Sleeper, Housesitter and Fly Away Home, as well as appearing in the TV mini-series Wild Palms. She also took on controversial roles, such as Mistress Lisa in Exit to Eden, where one film critic commented "The script was awful—Dana looked great".

On September 21, 1993, the CBS television film Donato and Daughter, directed by Rod Holcomb, premiered. In it Delany is paired with Charles Bronson to play the leads. Delany plays Bronson's daughter, both cops assigned to investigate a serial killer. Delany gave several reasons why she wanted to do the project. She said the story was appealing because "it was the relationship between the two that interested me. We see so many movies now about serial killers, it's really being overdone, so I wanted to emphasize the relationship between father and daughter". Also she liked that there was no romantic subplot by saying "why is it that in every movie, there has to be a male female thing going on? Why can't it be about a woman and her family and her work? That was the challenge because you want her to be strong and capable, but you also don't want her to be one-dimensional". Another reason she accepted is because she wanted to work with Charles Bronson. In Kay Gardella's review published in The Gazette she says "Delany and Bronson work well together. Bronson shows a warmer, more caring side than his usual tough-guy image allows. And Delany, as attractive as ever, is crisp and efficient as cop".

On December 25, Tombstone premiered in cinemas. She turned in her best known performance of the decade alongside Kurt Russell's Wyatt Earp, playing his love interest and future common-law wife Josephine Marcus.

Now a box office draw in her own right, the stage was set for the success she would encounter later in her career. Live Nude Girls included frank discussion by women of their sexual fantasies at a bachelorette party using a low-budget improvisational comedy format with strong chemistry between the actors. Reviews were mixed: Los Angeles Times critic Richard Natale liked the film but wrote older male film executives believed it to be "uncommercial"; another critic agreed it was "genuine girl talk" but "didn't have a lot of substance" and viewers "don't get to know the characters in the film". She also starred as Margaret Sanger in the TV movie Choices of the Heart: The Margaret Sanger Story (1995), about the controversial nurse who crusaded for women's reproductive rights in the early 1900s.

In 1995, Delany appeared in the Broadway show Translations and in May 1997, she returned to her alma mater Phillips Academy to work with theater students as an artist-in-residence. She appeared in TV movies such as True Women (1997) and Resurrection (1999). In 1998, Delany reportedly turned down the role of Carrie Bradshaw in the hit TV show Sex and the City. She declined the role partly because of the negative audience reaction she received with a similar film, Exit to Eden, a few years prior. Sex and the City became a successful series, and the role of Carrie made Sarah Jessica Parker world-famous. Delany played a gun-toting mother in an episode of the TV series Family Law (1999) for which she earned a Primetime Emmy Award nomination, but the series was not rerun due to sponsorship withdrawal.

Delany's first voice work was the character Andrea Beaumont in the 1993 animated feature film Batman: Mask of the Phantasm based on the popular TV show Batman: The Animated Series. She was also mentioned by name in one variation of the theme song of Animaniacs, another Warner Bros. production. She then voiced Lois Lane in Superman: The Animated Series, reprised her role as Lois Lane for the character's guest appearances in Justice League and Justice League Unlimited. She also voiced the character in The Batman. She returned to the DC Universe in an episode of Batman: The Brave and the Bold as Vilsi, an alternate universe variation of Lois Lane. She reprised her role in the 2013 animated movie Justice League: The Flashpoint Paradox.

=== 2000s: Television, movies, stage, Desperate Housewives ===
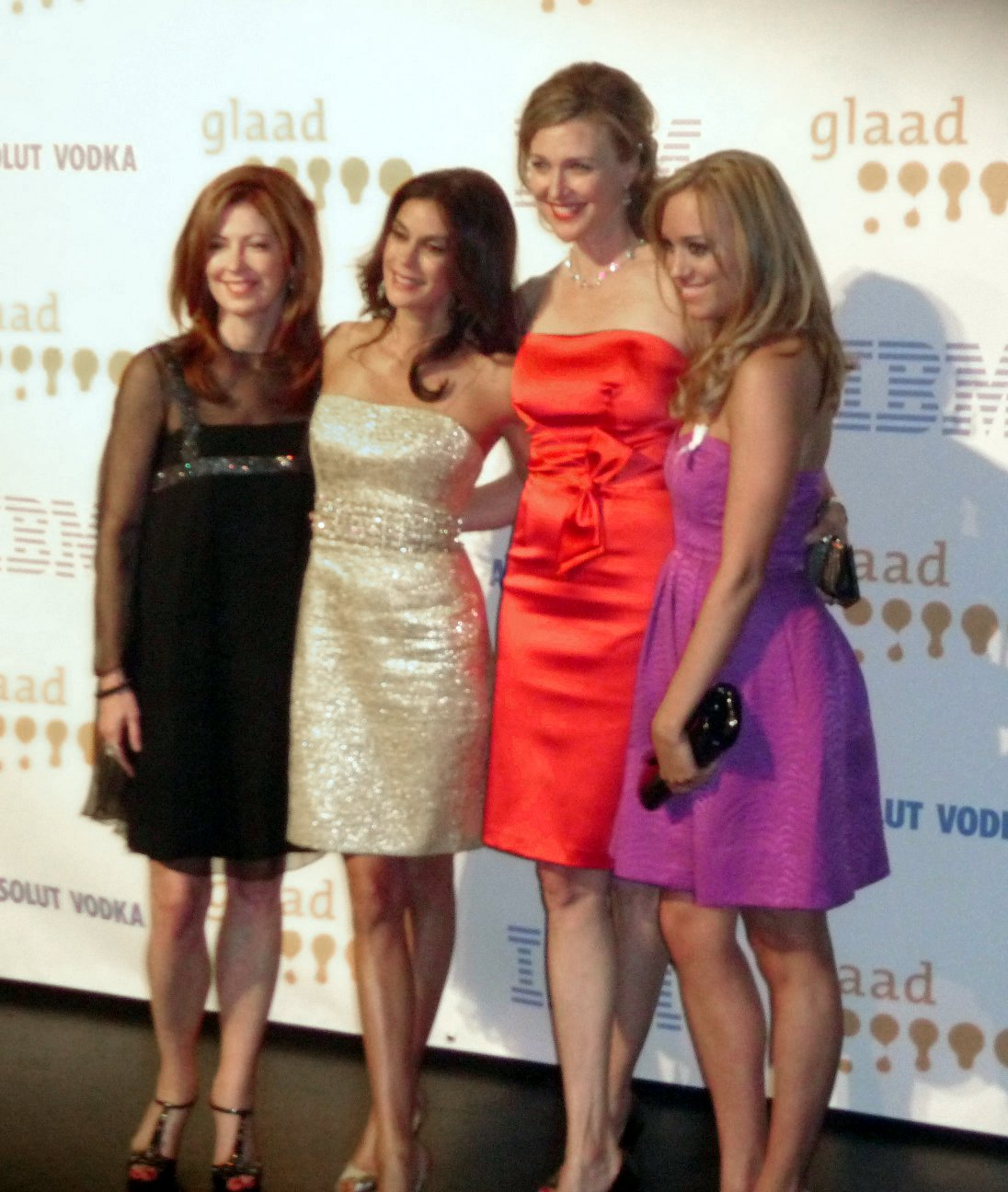
Delany, Teri Hatcher, Brenda Strong and Andrea Bowen at the 20^{th} GLAAD Media Awards in 2009.

Delany continued to find work in a variety of projects, doing pilots, TV series, made-for-TV movies, and feature films. She appeared in the NBC drama Good Guys/Bad Guys (2000), which Newsweek termed a "Sopranos knock-off". She appeared in the short-lived Pasadena (2001), a Fox production which was described as a "twisted rich-family saga" with a "great cast". Delany commented in an interview: "You can see Pasadena as a black comedy or see it as really tragic. A lot of soaps on television now don't have that layer of tragedy to them". She was an actor and co-executive producer of the film Final Jeopardy (2001). New York Daily News TV critic David Bianculli gave a positive review to both her performance as an actor—"Delany, as always, does pensive and independent better than most actresses"—and as a producer. She played a doctor in the TV series Presidio Med (2002), described as a "conventional but pleasant drama populated by characters dedicated to medicine who also have messy personal lives". She appeared in TV movies such as A Time to Remember (2003), and Baby for Sale (2004). She appeared in feature films by indie film producers, such as The Outfitters (1999), Mother Ghost (2002), and Spin (2003).

Returning to theater, she played an artsy and incompetent woman who questions the "imposed conventions of society" after discovering her husband's affair in the Pulitzer-prize winning Dinner With Friends (2000, New York City, Los Angeles, Boston); her performance earned positive reviews generally. She played Beatrice in Shakespeare's Much Ado About Nothing (2003, San Diego); one critic described the "verbal sparring" between Delany and actor Billy Campbell as a "joy".

From 2004 to 2006, Delany played many guest roles on TV shows, such as: Law & Order: Special Victims Unit, Boston Legal, Kojak, Related, The L Word and Battlestar Galactica. She also starred in the short-lived TV series Kidnapped (2006). One critic wrote "Delany is alternately furious and despondent as Ellie, and she and Hutton (Timothy Hutton) can do more without words than other actors can do with pages of dialogue. They're absolutely convincing as rich, complicated Manhattanites and as parents who come face to face with the scary reality that they can't always protect their kids".

Delany appeared as herself in the TV documentary Vietnam Nurses with Dana Delany which explored their lives and treatment after returning to the United States. Delany has become "something of a heroine to the nurses who served in Vietnam", according to Los Angeles Times writer Susan King, who noted that the actress worked on a nationwide nurse recruitment program in 1990 called the McMurphy project.

In 2007, Delany appeared in the films A Beautiful Life, Camp Hope, and Multiple Sarcasms.

Delany initially declined the offer to play one of the four Desperate Housewives principal characters, Bree Van De Kamp, saying it was too similar to her role on Pasadena. The show became a popular prime-time soap opera with substantial ratings. But in 2007, she was again offered a role by producer Marc Cherry, this time as a supporting housewife, and she joined the cast of the well-established series for the 2007–08 season. Reaction to the addition of Delany was positive; one critic wrote "... casting Dana Delany as Katherine Mayfair in Season 4 is one of the smartest things Cherry has ever done. Not many actors can deftly deliver both comedy and drama, but Delany makes it look easy". She commented about playing housewife Katherine Mayfair: "The hardest thing for me was figuring out the tone of the piece because it's such a specific tone – so it was more of an acting challenge than anything else". She commented in 2008: "I hope that she doesn't lose her snarkiness, because that's always fun to play". On May 13, 2008, it was announced that Delany would reprise her role on Desperate Housewives for season five, having been promoted to the sixth lead.

=== 2010s: Television series and movies ===
In March 2010, Delany appeared as FBI agent Jordan Shaw in a two-part story on the TV series Castle, which stars Nathan Fillion, who played her character's second husband on Desperate Housewives. Delany also voiced a character Margaret Rosenblatt in the film Firebreather in 2010. Delany left Desperate Housewives to star in the new ABC series Body of Proof originally slated to begin airing in late 2010. In the series, Delany played a brilliant neurosurgeon turned medical examiner after a car accident causes her to lose dexterity in her hands. Delany in real life had an experience similar to her character of Dr. Megan Hunt. Two weeks before filming the pilot episode, Delany's car was hit by a bus in Santa Monica; two fingers of her hand were broken and her car was totaled. Delany describes her character in Body of Proof as being "complicated, smart and definitely complex".

In May 2011, Delany was the host of the fourth annual Television Academy Honors. In 2011, Delany came ninth in People magazine's annual 100 Most Beautiful list. Delany appeared in the crime drama Freelancers with director Jessy Terrero. The film also stars Robert De Niro, Forest Whitaker, and 50 Cent. It was released to DVD on August 21, 2012, and had a limited release in theaters in September.

In December 2016, Delany was the primetime guest host on Turner Classic Movies. She appeared in dozens of wraparounds on the channel, filling in for Robert Osborne. Delany was cast for CBS's Drama The Code in August 2018.

== Personal life and public image ==
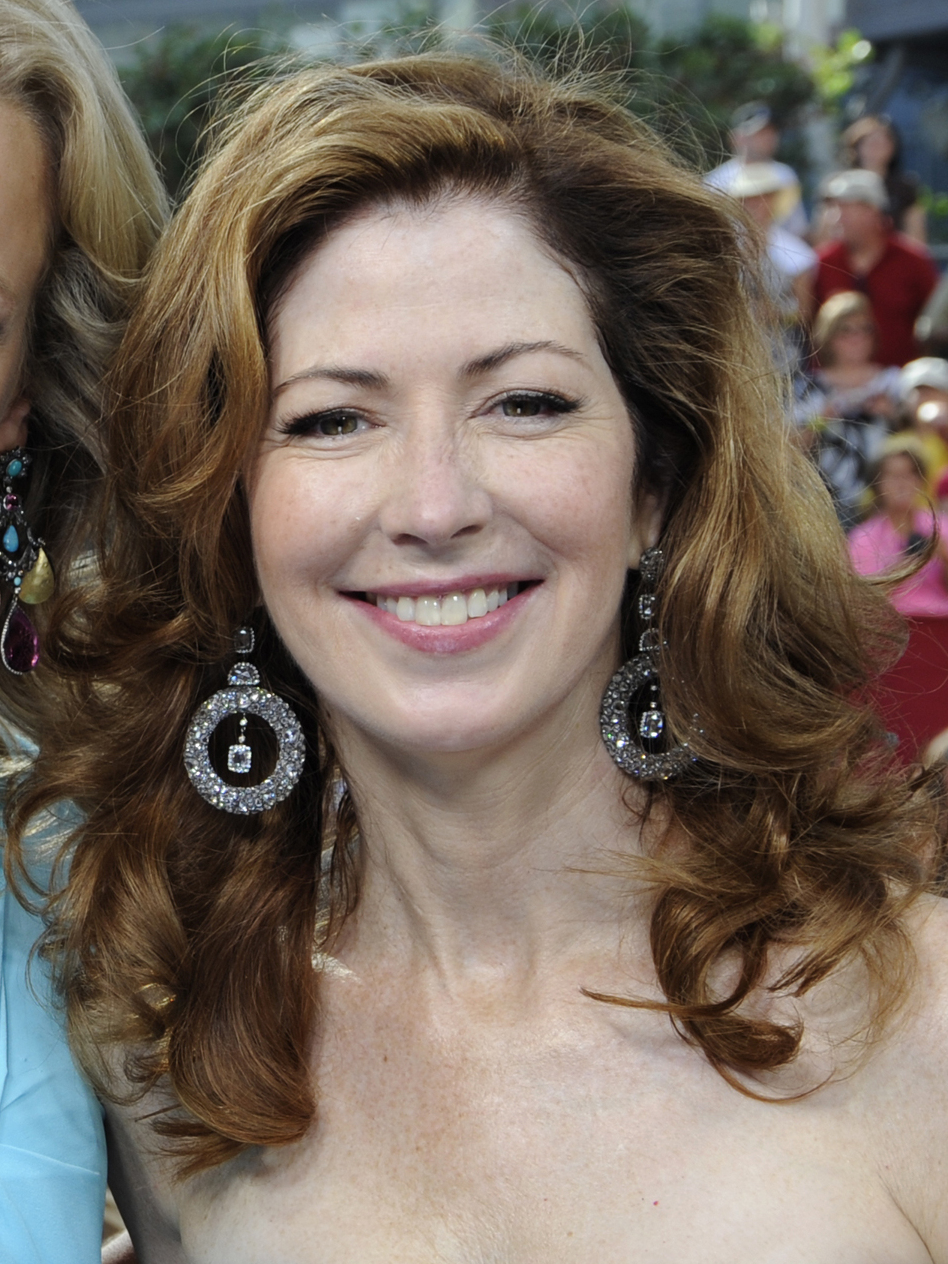
Delany at the 61^{st} Primetime Emmy Awards in 2009

Delany was a member of the Hollywood Women's Political Committee. Since the mid-1990s, Delany has served on the board of the Scleroderma Research Foundation, and with her friend Sharon Monsky, she helped campaign for support in finding a cure for scleroderma. Working with director Bob Saget, she starred in the TV movie For Hope (1996) based on Saget's sister Gay, who had died as a result of the disease. She appeared as a contestant on Celebrity Jeopardy in 2001, 2006 and 2009 to raise money for scleroderma research. Scleroderma "robs these women of not only their own lives in many cases, but robs their families which include countless children", she explained in 2002.

Delany is a board member of the arts advocacy organization Creative Coalition. She appeared in June 2009 in an onstage meeting in New York alongside White House social secretary Desiree Rogers to discuss ways to promote American cinematic creativity. In August 2009, Delany was named co-president of the Creative Coalition, joining Tim Daly in the leadership of the organization. Delany explained her support for the arts in an interview: "I just think it's so important for children and the future of the country and people's general happiness. I'm one of those people who, whenever I feel cut off spiritually or emotionally, I go to a museum or a play or a movie, and I'm just transported". She participated as a celebrity guest in fundraising events that support the rights of same-sex couples to marry.

In addition, she has supported Planned Parenthood. She attended the organization's 90th birthday celebration in New York City in 2006. Delany said: "It's hard to imagine where we'd be in this country had Margaret Sanger not founded that first clinic here in New York, 90 years ago". She attended events sponsored by the Gay and Lesbian Alliance Against Defamation. She is a Democrat who campaigned for Hillary Clinton in 2016.

Delany has never been married nor had any children. She commented about her personal life in an interview in 2006: "I turned 50 and I'm ready to get married... I don't know who he is yet but I'm ready... He has to be smart, funny and kind". She added a year later: "Marriage has never been a big deal for me... But, I think I'm ready now... I got to have all the fun in the world, to experience a lot of people and figure out what I really like". Delany (in 1988) said she doesn't find being a celebrity to be that appealing: "I'm not a 'personality'. I am never recognized, which I take as a compliment. I have a love-hate thing with publicity".

Delany, in 2003, tried having an injection of botox in her forehead, but the needle hit a nerve and created a bruise that affected the muscle in her right eye, causing it to droop slightly. In 2010, she vowed she would never have plastic surgery.

In 2010, Delany told Prevention that she prefers eating healthily, including vegetables, tofu, fish, gluten-free pasta, and bread.

In April 2011, Delany finished 9^{th} in People magazine's annual 100 Most Beautiful list.

In 2019, Delany commented on her approach to acting:

"The whole non sibi thing really informs my work ... Every role that I choose ... has to give back to the audience or say something about the world that has resonance and is reflective of the times we're in ... It also has to be able to make people think, or look at something differently ... Otherwise, why do it? It can't be about self-gratification. It can't be about ego. It can't be about money or being famous. I really believe that if you do the things that have meaning for you, the rest will come".

— Dana Delany (2019)

== Filmography ==
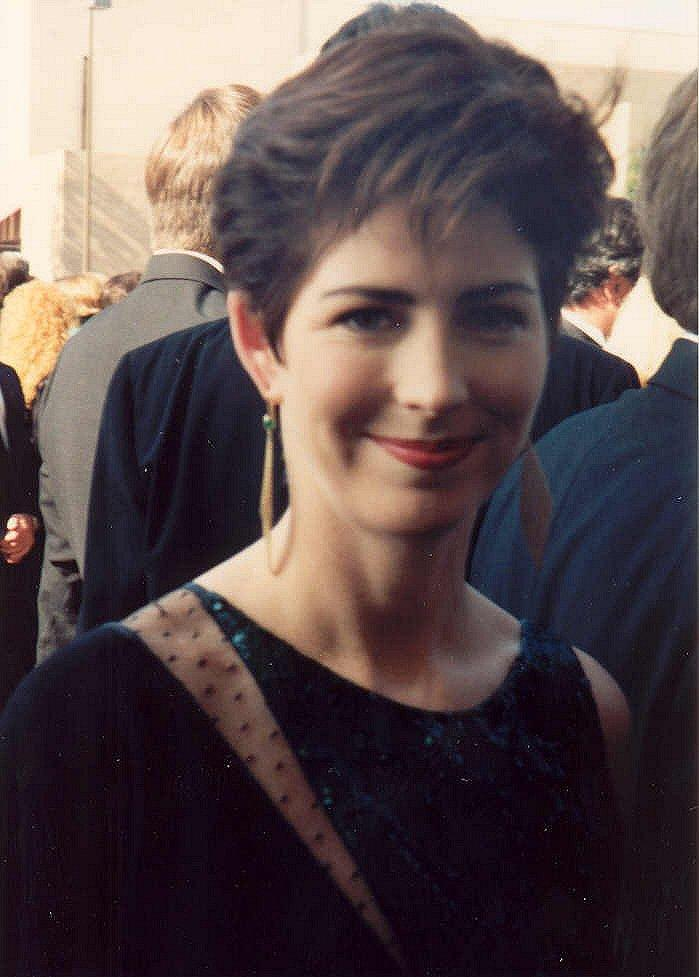
Delany at 43^{rd} Primetime Emmy Awards in 1991

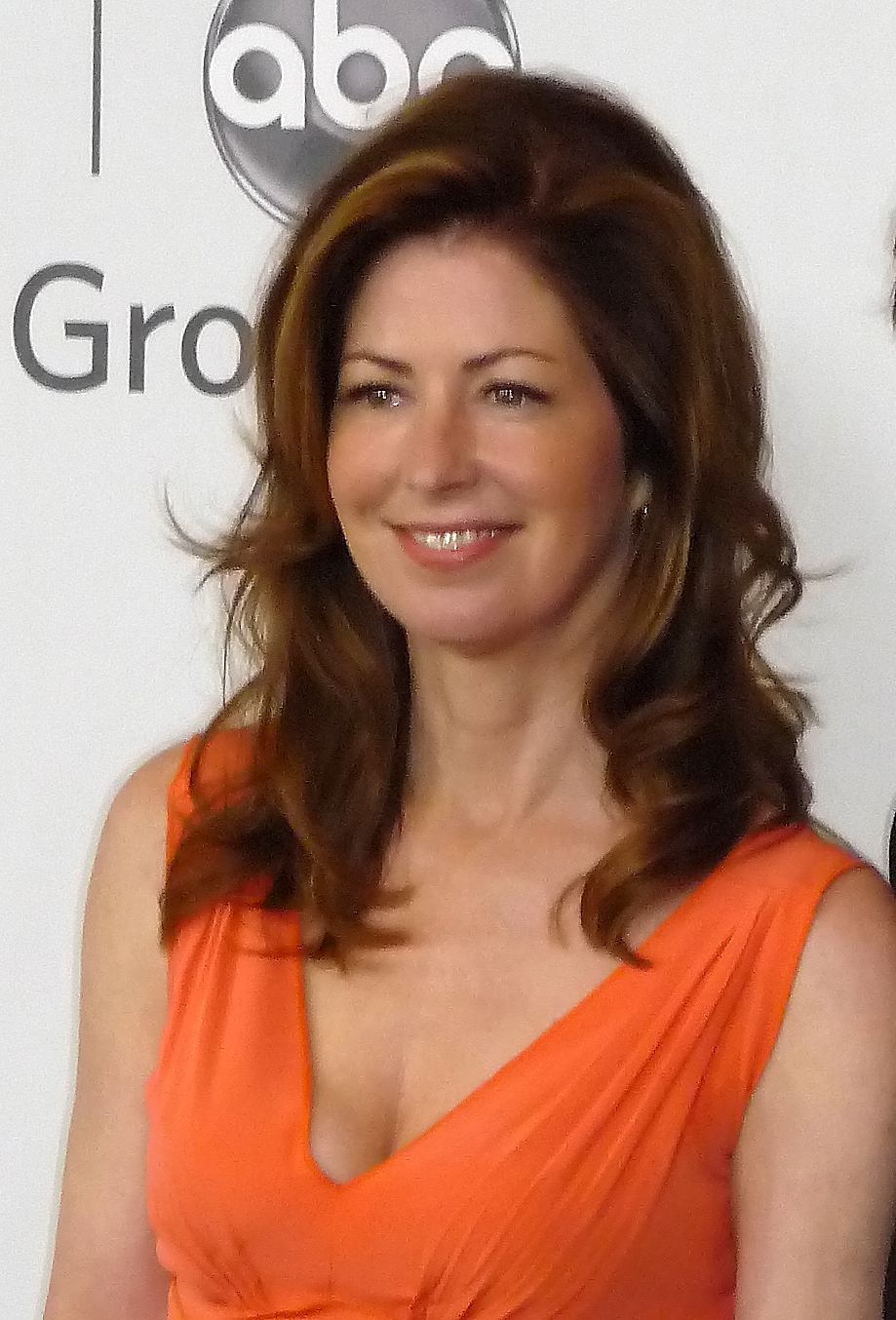
Delany in 2010

Film
Year	Title	Role	Notes
1981	The Fan	Saleswoman in record store	
1984	Almost You	Susan McCall	
1986	Where the River Runs Black	Sister Ana	
1988	Masquerade	Anne Briscoe	
1988	Patty Hearst	Gelina	
1988	Moon over Parador	Jenny	
1992	Light Sleeper	Marianne	
1992	Housesitter	Becky Metcalf	
1993	Tombstone	Josephine Marcus	
1993	Batman: Mask of the Phantasm	Andrea Beaumont / Chimera	Voice
1994	Exit to Eden	Lisa Emerson	
1995	Live Nude Girls	Jill	
1996	Adventures of Mowgli	Bagheera	Voice, English dub
1996	Fly Away Home	Susan Barnes	
1998	The Patron Saint of Liars	Rose Cleardon Abbott	
1998	The Curve	Dr. Ashley	
1998	Wide Awake	Mrs. Beal	
1999	Outfitters	Cat Bonfaim	
2000	The Right Temptation	Anthea Farrow-Smith	
2002	Mother Ghost	Karen Bennett	
2003	Spin	Margaret Swift-Bejarano	
2005	Getting to Know You	Marla	Short
2006	Superman: Brainiac Attacks	Lois Lane	Voice
2007	Route 30	Amish Martha	
2008	A Beautiful Life	Anne	
2008	Flying Lessons	Jeanne	
2010	Multiple Sarcasms	Annie	
2010	Camp Hope	Patricia	
2010	Drunkboat	Eileen	
2012	Freelancers	Lydia Vecchio	
2013	Justice League: The Flashpoint Paradox	Lois Lane	Voice
2017	Literally, Right Before Aaron	Wendy	
2020	Wild Mountain Thyme	Pub Band	
2024	The Union	Nicole	
2026	The Basics of Philosophy	Gloria	Post-production

Television
Year	Title	Role	Notes
1978	Ryan's Hope	Ryan's bar patron	
1978–79	Love of Life	Amy Russell	Series regular
1981	As the World Turns	Hayley Wilson Hollister	Series regular, role from January 2, 1981, to December 1, 1981
1984	Threesome	Laura Shaper	TV film
1984	The Streets	Jeannie	TV film
1985	Moonlighting	Jillian Armstrong	Episode: "Knowing Her"
1986	A Winner Never Quits	Nora	TV film
1986	Liberty	Moya Trevor	TV film
1986–87	Magnum, P.I.	Cynthia Farrell	Episodes: "L.A." and "Out of Sync"
1987	Sweet Surrender	Georgia Holden	Series regular, 6 episodes
1988	Thirtysomething	Eve	Episode: "South by Southeast"
1988–91	China Beach	Colleen McMurphy	Series regular, 62 episodes
1990	A Promise to Keep	Jane Goodrich	TV film
1992	Cheers	Susan Metheny	Episode: "Love Me, Love My Car"
1993	Wild Palms	Grace Wyckoff	TV miniseries, 5 episodes
1993	Donato and Daughter	Lieutenant Dena Donato	TV film
1994	The Enemy Within	Betsy Corcoran	TV film
1994	Texan	Anne Williams	TV short
1995	Fallen Angels	Helen Fiske	Episode: "Good Housekeeping"
1995	Choices of the Heart: The Margaret Sanger Story	Margaret Sanger	TV film
1996	For Hope	Hope Altman	TV film
1996	Wing Commander Academy	Gwen Archer Bowman	Voice, 13 episodes
1996–2000	Superman: The Animated Series	Lois Lane	Voice, 44 episodes
1997	Duckman	Dr. Susan Fox	Voice, episode: "Role with It"
1997	True Women	Sarah Ashby McClure	TV film
1997	Spy Game	Honey Trapp	Episode: "Dead and Gone, Honey"
1998	The Patron Saint of Liars	Rose Cleardon Abbott	TV film
1998	Rescuers: Stories of Courage: Two Couples	Johtje Vos	TV film
1999	Resurrection	Clare Miller	TV film
1999	Sirens	Sally Rawlings	TV film
1999	Shake, Rattle and Roll: An American Love Story	Elaine Gunn	TV film
2001	Family Law	Mary Sullivan	Episode: "Safe At Home"
2001	Final Jeopardy	Alexandra Cooper	TV film, also co-executive producer
2001–02	Pasadena	Catherine McAllister	Series regular, 13 episodes
2002	Conviction	Martha	TV film
2002–03	Presidio Med	Dr. Rae Brennan	Series regular, 13 episodes
2003	A Time to Remember	Britt Calhoun	TV film
2003–05	Justice League	Lois Lane, Loana	Voice, 7 episodes
2004	Baby for Sale	Nathalie Johnson	TV film
2004	Law & Order: Special Victims Unit	Carolyn Spencer	Episode: "Obscene"
2004	Boston Legal	Samantha Fleming	Episode: "Truth Be Told"
2005	Kojak	Kate McNeil	Episodes: "All Bets Are Off, Parts I and II"
2005–06	Related	Francesca Sorelli	Episodes: "Francesca" and "The Move"
2006	The L Word	Senator Barbara Grisham	Episode: "Light My Fire"
2006	Battlestar Galactica	Sesha Abinell	Episode: "Sacrifice"
2006	The Woman with the Hungry Eyes	Theda Bara	Voice
2006	Kidnapped	Ellie Cain	Series regular, 13 episodes
2007	The Batman	Lois Lane	Voice, episode: "The Batman/Superman Story"
2007–10, 2012	Desperate Housewives	Katherine Mayfair	Series regular (Seasons 4–6), Special guest star (Season 8); 55 episodes
2010	Batman: The Brave and the Bold	Vilsi Vaylar	Voice, episode: "The Super-Batman of Planet X!"
2010	Castle	Special Agent Jordan Shaw	Episodes: "Tick, Tick, Tick..." and "Boom!"
2010	Firebreather	Margaret Rosenblatt	Voice, TV film
2011–13	Body of Proof	Dr. Megan Hunt	Series regular, 42 episodes
2014–17	Hand of God	Crystal Harris	Series regular, 20 episodes
2015	The Comedians	Julie	Recurring role, 5 episodes
2015	No Second Chance	Loraine Tansmore	French miniseries, 4 episodes
2018	Bull	Assistant US Attorney Banner	Episode: "Bad Medicine"
2019	The Code	Colonel Glenn Turnbull, USMC	JAG Premier April 9, 2019
2021	The American Guest	Edith Roosevelt	HBO Max miniseries
2022–2026	Tulsa King	Margaret Devereaux	Main role (seasons 1–4); 31 episodes
2023	The Other Two	Emily Overruled	Episode: "Brooke Gets Her Hands Dirty"
2023	Mayans MC	Deputy Patricia Devlin	Final season; 5 episodes

Other work
Year	Title	Role	Notes
1974	South Pacific	Nellie Forbush	Musical at Phillips Academy
1980	A Life		Broadway play
1983	Wisk detergent	Lady in an elevator	TV commercial (opposite Tom McBride)
1983	Blood Moon	Innocent pre-med student	Off-broadway production by Nicholas Kazan
1995	Translations	Maire	Broadway play (short-lived)
1998	Louise Brooks: Looking for Lulu		Documentary
2000	Dinner With Friends	Beth	Stage; Pulitzer-prize script
2002	Superman: Shadow of Apokolips	Lois Lane	Video game
2003	Much Ado About Nothing	Beatrice	Stage, San Diego
2006	Vietnam Nurses with Dana Delany	Host	Documentary
2007	Life on the Refrigerator Door	Narrator	Audio book by Alice Kuipers
2009	PoliWood	Herself	Documentary
2009	Annul Victory	Herself	Documentary
2013	The Parisian Woman	Chloe	Play
2017	The Night of the Iguana	Maxine Faulk	Play
2018	Collective Rage: A Play in 5 Betties	Betty No. 1	Off-Broadway production written by Jen Silverman
2024	Highway Patrol	Herself	Play

== Awards and nominations ==
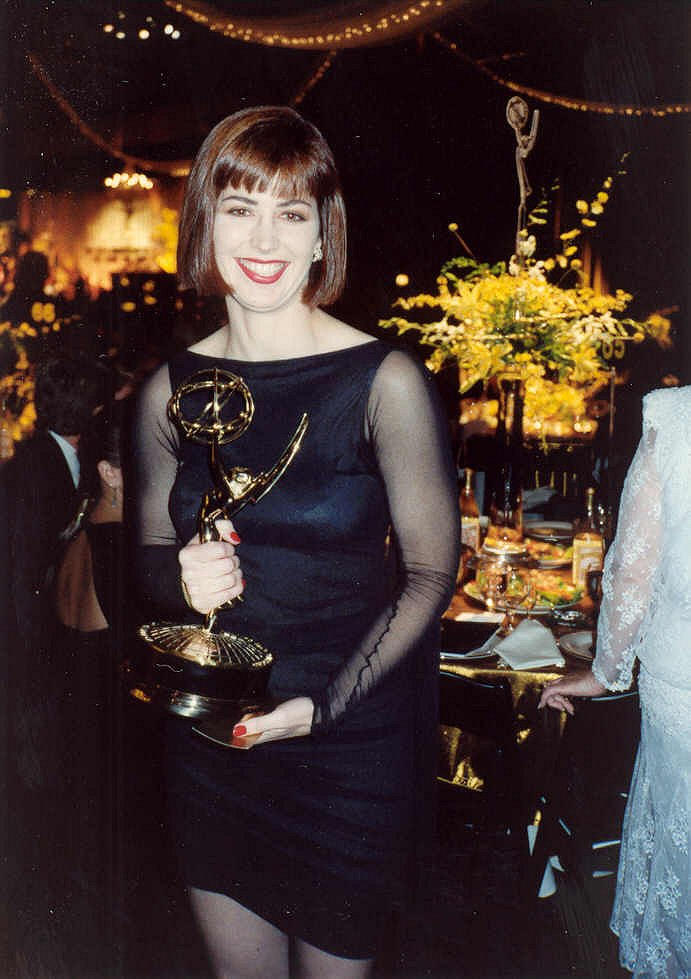
Delany at 41^{st} Primetime Emmy Awards, holding the award she won in 1989.

Year	Award	Category	Film or series	Result
1989	Primetime Emmy Award	Outstanding Lead Actress in a Drama Series	China Beach	Won
1989	Viewers for Quality Television Award	Best Actress in a Quality Drama Series	China Beach	Won
1990	Primetime Emmy Award	Outstanding Lead Actress in a Drama Series	China Beach	Nominated
1990	Golden Globe Award	Best Actress in a Television Series – Drama	China Beach	Nominated
1990	Viewers for Quality Television Award	Best Actress in a Quality Drama Series	China Beach	Won
1991	Primetime Emmy Award	Outstanding Lead Actress in a Drama Series	China Beach	Nominated
1991	Golden Globe Award	Best Actress in a Television Series – Drama	China Beach	Nominated
1991	Viewers for Quality Television Award	Best Actress in a Quality Drama Series	China Beach	Won
1992	Primetime Emmy Award	Outstanding Lead Actress in a Drama Series	China Beach	Won
1998	Lone Star Film & Television	Best TV Actress	True Women	Won
2001	Primetime Emmy Award	Outstanding Guest Actress in a Drama Series	Family Law	Nominated
2007	TV Land Award	Lady You Love to Watch Fight for Her Life in a Movie of the Week	Movie of the Week	Nominated
2008	Screen Actors Guild Award	Outstanding Performance by an Ensemble in a Comedy Series	Desperate Housewives	Nominated
2009	PRISM Award	Best Performance in a Comedy Series	Desperate Housewives	Won
2009	Screen Actors Guild Award	Outstanding Performance by an Ensemble in a Comedy Series	Desperate Housewives	Nominated
2014	Los Angeles Drama Critics Circle Award	Outstanding Lead Performance	The Parisian Woman	Nominated
