= The Kidnapping of Edgardo Mortara =

The Kidnapping of Edgardo Mortara may refer to:

- The Mortara case, an Italian cause célèbre in the 1850s and 1860s
- The Kidnapping of Edgardo Mortara, a 1997 non-fiction book by David I. Kertzer
- The Kidnapping of Edgardo Mortara (film), a cancelled film adaptation of the Kertzer book
