= Jodi Peikoff =

American lawyer

- Education: Cardozo School of Law (JD)
- Occupation: Lawyer
- Known for: Power lawyer in Hollywood

Jodi Peikoff is an American lawyer based in New York City. A partner at Peikoff Mahan, she specifically practices law in the entertainment business.

Variety's 2024 Legal Impact Report named Peikoff a "top entertainment lawyer." The Hollywood Reporter named her as one of "Hollywood’s Top 100 Attorneys" for several years, as well a "power lawyer."

== Education ==
Peikoff attended the Cardozo School of Law.

== Career ==
Peikoff has represented America Ferrera, Felicity Jones, Charlotte Wells, Ezra Miller, Tilda Swinton, Lee Pace, Sally Hawkins, Mark Rylance, Dan Stevens, Paterson Joseph, and many others. Her deals include bringing Ferrera onto Barbie, getting Rylance onto Dunkirk, Ready Player One, and The Kidnapping of Edgardo Mortara as a co-star, landing an eight-figure deal for Kristen Anderson-Lopez and Robert Lopez as songwriters for Frozen 2, signing Miller to Fantastic Beasts and The Flash, and more.

In 2020, Peikoff was one of 368 women lawyers who signed an amicus brief to the Supreme Court of the United States on behalf of reproductive rights.

== Honors ==
- The Hollywood Reporter's Power Lawyers 2015
- The Hollywood Reporter's Power Lawyers 2016
- The Hollywood Reporter's Power Lawyers 2019
- The Hollywood Reporter's Power Lawyers 2020
- The Hollywood Reporter's Power Lawyers 2021
- The Hollywood Reporter's Power Lawyers 2022
- The Hollywood Reporter's Power Lawyers 2023
- The Hollywood Reporter's Power Lawyers 2024
