= Spin (2003 film) =

- Directed by: James Redford
- Written by: Donald Everett Axinn; James Redford
- Produced by: Donald Everett Axinn; Laurel Ladevich; Claudine Magre; Jay Parini
- Starring: Ryan Merriman; Stanley Tucci; Dana Delany; Paula Garcés; Rubén Blades
- Music by: Todd Boekelheide
- Distributed by: Screen Media Films
- Release dates: November 8, 2003 (Los Angeles International Film Festival); October 15, 2004 (United States)
- Running time: 107 minutes
- Country: United States
- Language: English

Spin is a 2003 American drama film starring Ryan Merriman, Stanley Tucci, Dana Delany, Paula Garcés and Rubén Blades. It was released at the Cannes Film Market 17 May 2004 and was limited released in the United States 15 October 2004. Spin was adapted from a novel by Donald Everett Axinn. The film won two awards at the Heartland Film Festival in 2003.

== Cast ==
- Ryan Merriman as Eddie Haley
- Stanley Tucci as Frank Haley
- Dana Delany as Margaret
- Paula Garcés as Francesca
- Rubén Blades as Ernesto
