= Steven Spielberg's unrealized projects =

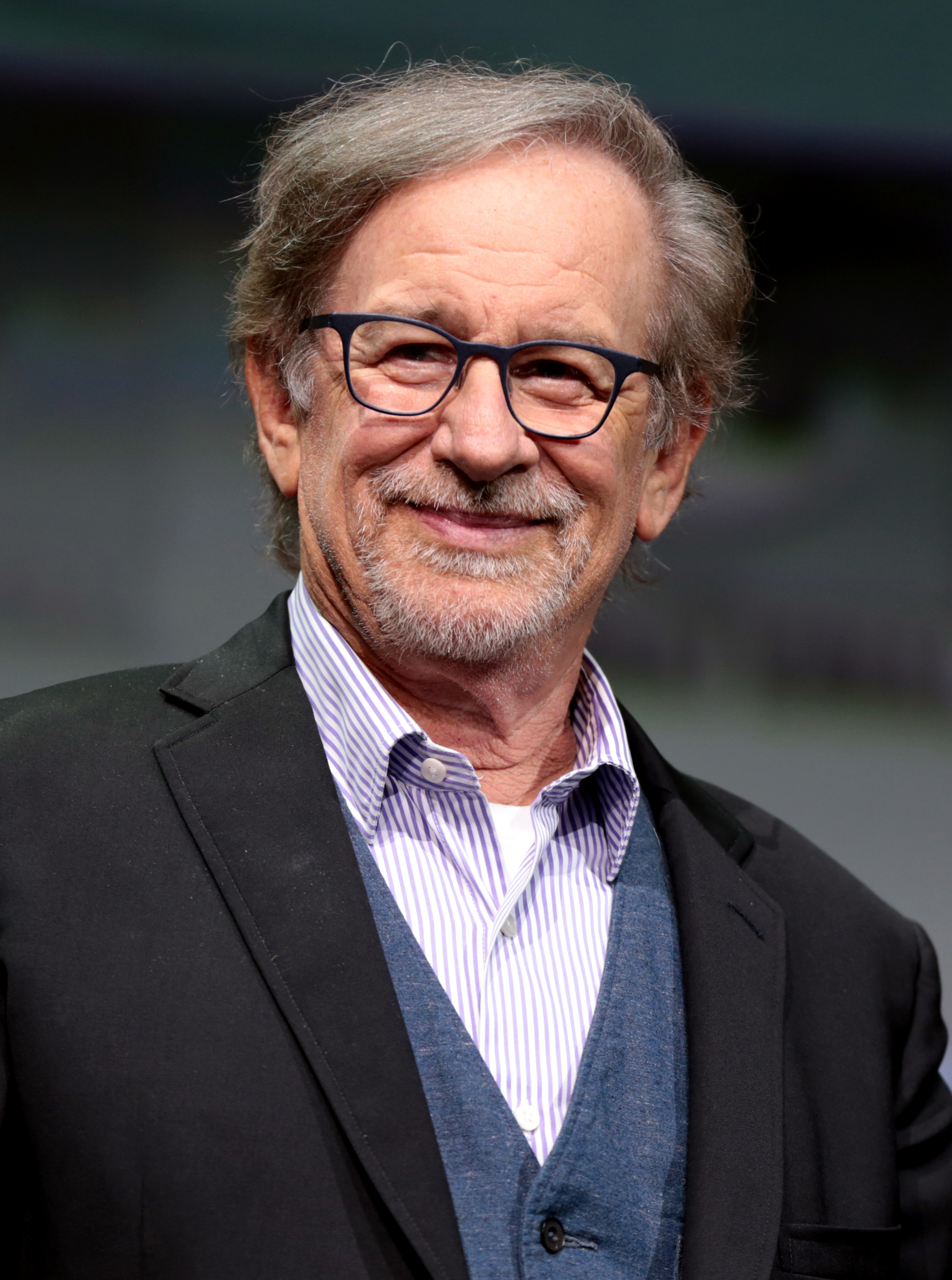
Spielberg, pictured at the 2017 San Diego Comic-Con

During his long career, American filmmaker Steven Spielberg has worked on a number of projects which never progressed beyond the pre-production stage under his direction. Some of these projects fell into "development hell" or were officially canceled, some were turned over to other production teams, and others never made it past the speculative stage.

== 1960s ==
=== A Wooden Nickel ===
In 1966, Spielberg took an interest in directing Claudia Salter's screenplay A Wooden Nickel, which was sold to Universal Pictures, but at the time he was only 20 years old and no studio would hire him.

=== Snow White ===
In February 1969, it was reported that a young Spielberg was hired by producer Dick Berg to direct a "modern retelling" of Snow White for Universal Pictures, based on a story by Donald Barthelme published in The New Yorker in 1967. This version was to be set in a Chinese food factory, and feature the title character "[sharing] her San Francisco apartment with seven young men while waiting for her prince to show up." In the 1970s, he pitched the property again to Universal, alongside Ace Eli and Rodger of the Skies and the Thomas Crapper biopic, but it failed to materialize.

=== Winkler ===
In addition to Barthelme's Snow White, another project Spielberg flirted with directing as his feature debut was a love story called Winkler.

=== Ace Eli and Rodger of the Skies ===
In 1969, Spielberg teamed with comedy writer Carl Gottlieb to pitch a World War I aircraft flying film to Warner Bros. Pictures, but the deal fell through due to Spielberg's young age. Still intrigued by the prospect of making a barnstorming film, Spielberg enlisted Claudia Salter to help him conceive a father-son story, which would become the basis for Ace Eli and Rodger of the Skies. When the screenplay was finished, Spielberg sent it to 20th Century Fox president Richard D. Zanuck, who wanted to buy the property but would also decline to hire him to direct it. By 1970, following Zanuck's departure from the studio, Fox announced that Spielberg would direct Ace Eli, with Joe Wizan producing. A year later, Robert Fryer took over as producer and replaced Spielberg with John Erman. The film originally ended with the character Eli committing suicide, but the studio recut it to give it a happier ending and shelved it for two years. Unhappy with the final film, Salter, Erman and the producers had their names removed from the credits. Spielberg was so displeased when he finally saw it that he publicly complained it had been "turned into a really sick film. They should bury it."

== 1970s ==
=== Flushed with Pride: The Story of Thomas Crapper ===
At the beginning of the 1970s, Spielberg tried to convince Universal Pictures to greenlight the production of Flushed with Pride: The Story of Thomas Crapper, the semi-satirical biography of Thomas Crapper, who, as the book suggested, invented the flushing toilet. Spielberg approached screenwriters Gloria Katz and Willard Huyck to write the script.

=== Slide ===
Around 1971, actor Joseph Walsh wrote California Split, a screenplay about his own gambling addiction which he developed with Spielberg at his home for eight months. At this time, the screenplay was called Slide and Spielberg had a deal to direct it at MGM with Walsh as producer and Steve McQueen starring in the role which Elliott Gould would later play. However, studio head Jim Aubrey wanted them to change it to "a straight movie", demanding it be retitled Lucky Chip and for Dean Martin to be the star of it. Walsh and Spielberg left MGM and took the script to Universal Pictures where they had an agreement with Richard D. Zanuck and David Brown. Zanuck and Brown then hired Spielberg to direct The Sugarland Express, leaving Robert Altman to take his place. Spielberg later told Walsh, "I would have definitely made more money with this film [than Sugarland]. But I could never have made a better picture."

=== White Lightning ===
Before choosing The Sugarland Express, Spielberg considered directing the Burt Reynolds vehicle White Lightning as his first theatrical release. "I spent two-and-a-half months on the film," Spielberg explained, "met Burt once, found most of the locations and began to cast the movie, until I realized it wasn't something that I wanted to do for a first film. I didn't want to start my career as a hard-hat, journeyman director. I wanted to do something that was a little more personal."

=== Cruising ===
In the early 1970s, film producer Philip D'Antoni hired Spielberg to direct a film adaptation of Gerald Walker's novel Cruising. Spielberg was reportedly attached to the project for three years before officially dropping out. According to D'Antoni, "We just couldn't come up with a script that met with my satisfaction... So we decided to abandon the project, and figured we'd go on to do something else together some other day, and Steven went back to L.A." The film adaptation was eventually directed by William Friedkin.

=== ER ===
Michael Crichton initially wrote a screenplay for a film about an emergency room, and met with Spielberg in 1974, with Spielberg intended to direct. The film would be shelved until the 1990s, when Crichton and Spielberg revisited it and both concluded it would work better as a television series, which debuted in 1994.

=== Lucky Lady ===
Spielberg was considered to direct Lucky Lady for 20th Century Fox. The script was written by Willard Huyck and Gloria Katz, and Paul Newman was to have starred in the film had Spielberg directed. However, Spielberg could not direct the film due to his commitment with Jaws.

=== The Bingo Long Traveling All-Stars & Motor Kings ===
In 1975, it was reported that Spielberg had agreed to direct The Bingo Long Traveling All-Stars & Motor Kings for Universal Pictures, and planned to join screenwriters Hal Barwood and Matthew Robbins in a meeting with producer Rob Cohen. Spielberg would depart from the film several months later due to post-production obligations on Jaws. John Badham took his place and made his feature directorial debut with the film.

=== Superman ===
Around 1975, after the success of Jaws, Alexander Salkind and his son Ilya wanted to hire Spielberg to direct Superman, the first theatrical movie based on the Superman comic book series. However, due to Spielberg's commitment to Close Encounters of the Third Kind, the Salkinds finally hired Richard Donner to direct the film.

=== The Spy Who Loved Me and Moonraker ===
In 1975, Spielberg called Albert R. Broccoli offering to direct The Spy Who Loved Me, but was turned down. In 1978, after the successful release of Close Encounters of the Third Kind, he offered to direct a second time on Moonraker. Afterwards, he became uninterested in directing any James Bond films.

=== The Ninth Man ===
Spielberg's follow-up to Jaws was almost an adaptation of John Lee's then newly published WWII thriller novel The Ninth Man, which was inspired by the true events of eight Nazi saboteurs who landed by submarine and were captured on Long Island in 1942, with the ninth man managing to escape. Filmmaker Todd Field later revived the project in 2004 and had sought to direct it through DreamWorks.

=== Unused Indiana Jones film concepts ===
The Adventures of Indiana Smith: In May 1977, Spielberg met his colleague George Lucas in Hawaii. During that vacation, Lucas convinced Spielberg to make a film based on the film serials of the 1930s and 1940s. Lucas previously wrote a script for the planned film, entitled The Adventures of Indiana Smith; in which the main character, Indiana Smith, was based on James Bond. However, at the final moment, both Lucas and Spielberg made many changes to the script, whose concept was used to create Raiders of the Lost Ark, and subsequently, the Indiana Jones film franchise.

Indiana Jones and the Monkey King: In September 1984, after the critical mixed reception of Indiana Jones and the Temple of Doom, George Lucas wrote a script entitled Indiana Jones and the Monkey King for the third installment of the film series. The film had the Fountain of Youth as the MacGuffin. Spielberg was attached to direct, but at the final moment, Spielberg decided to hire Chris Columbus to rewrite the script, and the third film ended up being Indiana Jones and the Last Crusade.

Indiana Jones and the Saucermen from Mars: In 1995, a time after the cancellation of The Young Indiana Jones Chronicles, Jeb Stuart wrote a script for the fourth film in the Indiana Jones film series, entitled Indiana Jones and the Saucermen from Mars. Spielberg was supposed to direct it, while George Lucas was supposed to serve as producer. Although Lucas loved the script, Spielberg and Ford had issues with it, so Spielberg hired Indiana Jones and the Last Crusade writer Jeffrey Boam to make a rewrite of Stuart's script. However, the script was finally rejected after the release of Independence Day, which was released one year later. The fourth film, entitled Indiana Jones and the Kingdom of the Crystal Skull, was finally released in 2008.

Indiana Jones and the City of Gods: On May 17, 2002, IGN reported that The Young Indiana Jones Chronicles writer Frank Darabont would write the fourth film of the Indiana Jones franchise, entitled Indiana Jones and the City of Gods, in which ex-Nazis would chase Indiana Jones. The script is very similar to the final script, including Indy's and Marion's wedding and a scene with army ants, but it did not include Indiana Jones' son. Spielberg liked the script very much, but George Lucas disliked it, and for that reason, he hired David Koepp to write the film. The film ended up being Indiana Jones and the Kingdom of the Crystal Skull, which was released in 2008, with Spielberg returning as director.

Indiana Jones 5: On February 26, 2020, it was reported that Spielberg chose not to direct the fifth Indiana Jones film, as he wanted to "pass along Indy's whip to a new generation to bring their perspective to the story". James Mangold took over as director, with Spielberg remaining involved in the film as an executive producer, while Ford starred as Jones.

=== Close Encounters of the Third Kind sequel ===
In late 1977, after the successful reception of Close Encounters of the Third Kind, Spielberg expressed interest in filming a sequel or a prequel. However, he later refused the idea, because he felt that "the army's knowledge and ensuing cover-up is so subterranean that it would take a creative screen story, perhaps someone else making the picture and giving it the equal time it deserves". He also did not want developer Columbia Pictures to make a sequel without him, which had happened with Universal Pictures' Jaws.

=== Night Skies ===
After his decision not to make a sequel to Close Encounters of the Third Kind, Spielberg started the development of his next project, a science fiction horror film entitled Night Skies, whose concept was pitched by him during the development of Close Encounters. The film was intended to be a spiritual follow-up to Close Encounters. Lawrence Kasdan was attached to write the screenplay. The film was never made, although elements of it inspired two other Spielberg films: Poltergeist and E.T. the Extra-Terrestrial (although the first was not directed by Spielberg).

=== Growing Up ===
In the late 1970s, Spielberg approached Robert Zemeckis and Bob Gale, whose script 1941 he was already preparing to shoot, to write for him a small, low-budget film about his youth in Arizona that he could quickly make before embarking on 1941. Announced in 1978 as "a personal story of his own young adulthood", their script was a foul-mouthed, R-rated comedy about 12-year-olds then called After School, which Spielberg approved of. "I don't want to make a movie about children that's dimples or cuteness," he said at the time. "It's my first vendetta film. I'm going to get back at about twenty people I've always wanted to get back at". The film (retitled at some point to Clearwater, and finally Growing Up), was set to shoot in May 1978 with a budget of just $1.5 million, but when cinematographer Caleb Deschanel called the script "disgusting", Spielberg backed out of the project.

=== Magic ===
In the late 1970s, Spielberg expressed interest in directing a film adaptation of William Goldman's novel Magic and considered casting Robert De Niro for the lead role. The film ended up being directed by Richard Attenborough and Spielberg admitted, "...I went to see the picture and realized that it was a hell of a lot better than what I would have done."

=== Something Wicked This Way Comes ===
In the late 1970s, Spielberg expressed interest in filming Ray Bradbury's story Something Wicked This Way Comes, which would eventually be directed by Jack Clayton, through Disney in 1983.

== 1980s ==
=== Blackhawk ===
In the early 1980s, Spielberg announced that he had plans to direct a film adaptation of the Blackhawk comic book series. Dan Aykroyd was attached to play Blackhawk. However, the project never materialized and Spielberg chose to direct Raiders of the Lost Ark. In April 2018, new development emerged when it was announced that Spielberg would produce/direct a new film adaptation of Blackhawk for Warner Bros. Pictures, with the screenplay being written by David Koepp. Spielberg would also co-produce the film with Kristie Macosko Krieger and Sue Kroll.

In 2021, a fan unearthed a now deleted Instagram post from David Koepp stating that the film was still in development and that Spielberg was still attached. The title at that time was Blackhawks.

=== Reel to Reel ===
Around 1980, during the filming of Raiders of the Lost Ark, Spielberg contacted Gary David Goldberg to make a semi-autobiographical musical film entitled Reel to Reel. The film's plot would have been surrounding a filmmaker named Stuart Moss, and his direction of a musical remake of Invaders From Mars. The film was officially announced in production in 1983, but Spielberg finally abandoned the project and chose to direct Indiana Jones and the Temple of Doom. According to the Los Angeles Times, the film was to have been directed by Michael Cimino and distributed by Columbia Pictures.

=== Three Amigos ===
After he finished Raiders of the Lost Ark, Spielberg almost planned to direct the comedy Three Amigos next, with Steve Martin, Bill Murray and Robin Williams as the leads. He chose to direct E.T. the Extra-Terrestrial instead.

=== The Talisman ===
Spielberg has made several attempts to make a film adaptation of Stephen King and Peter Straub's 1984 novel The Talisman ever since he and Universal Pictures bought the film rights in 1982. In the mid-2000s, Spielberg almost adapted The Talisman into a six-hour miniseries for TNT.

=== E.T. II: Nocturnal Fears ===
In July 1982, Spielberg hired E.T. the Extra-Terrestrial writer Melissa Mathison to write a script for a sequel film, entitled E.T. II: Nocturnal Fears. The film's plot would have shown Elliott and his friends getting abducted by evil aliens and follow their attempts to contact E.T. for help. However, Spielberg finally decided to cancel the sequel's production, feeling it "would do nothing but rob the original of its virginity".

=== Untitled musical film ===
In a 1982 interview with Première, Spielberg revealed he was then planning a musical film project with Quincy Jones. "I'm a big fan of Quincy's. I thought this would be a perfect opportunity to combine what he does best with what I do well and make a 'dangerous' movie." This project failed to materialize, and instead, the two collaborated on The Color Purple (which Jones produced and scored) in 1985, which would be adapted into a musical several decades later.

=== Starfire ===
In December 1982, Spielberg planned to team with fellow filmmaker Brian De Palma for the science fiction film Starfire, after several projects the two wanted to make first.

=== Big ===
Spielberg was initially attached to direct Big but dropped out when his son Max was born and due to scheduling conflicts with Empire of the Sun. He had many meetings with James L. Brooks about the film and wanted to cast Harrison Ford as Josh, but Penny Marshall would ultimately fill his position, and cast Tom Hanks for the role instead. Spielberg later said that his decision to not direct the film was because he believed his sister Anne would not get any credit for her script, since they are siblings.

=== Rain Man ===
Spielberg was among the few filmmakers attached to direct Rain Man prior to Barry Levinson's official involvement. It was Spielberg who convinced screenwriter Ronald Bass to make the character of Raymond Babbitt an autistic savant. Spielberg dropped out as he was obligated to direct Indiana Jones and the Last Crusade, but has also since expressed regret for not having directed Rain Man.

=== Calvin and Hobbes ===
In 1988, Spielberg requested to speak to cartoonist Bill Watterson about potentially making an animated film based on his popular daily comic strip Calvin and Hobbes. When Universal Press Syndicate tried to set up an appointment, Watterson immediately shut the idea down, as he was not interested in turning it into a movie.

=== Who Discovered Roger Rabbit ===
In 1989, Spielberg discussed with J. J. Abrams the possibility of making a prequel to the successful Who Framed Roger Rabbit. The prequel's plot would have been Roger Rabbit, Baby Herman, and Richie Davenport traveling west to seek Roger's mother, in the process meeting Jessica Krupnick (Roger's future wife), a struggling Hollywood actress. While Roger and Ritchie are enlisting in the Army, Jessica is kidnapped and forced to make pro-Nazi Germany broadcasts. The film would also have been the first true film from Amblin Entertainment's animation division Amblimation. However, after directing Schindler's List, Spielberg refused to direct any films satirizing the Nazis.

== 1990s ==
=== Cape Fear ===
In the early stages of development, Spielberg was slated to direct the remake of the 1962 film Cape Fear whereas Martin Scorsese would direct Schindler's List (1993). Had Spielberg directed, he envisioned the roles of Max Cady and Sam Bowden to be portrayed by Bill Murray and Harrison Ford respectively. Spielberg eventually decided to swap projects with Scorsese in favor of directing Schindler's List instead. Although he was uncredited, Spielberg did remain as an executive producer of the remake.

=== Rules Don't Apply ===
In 1990, Spielberg was attached to direct Warren Beatty in a biopic about Howard Hughes film that was written by Bo Goldman. The film was eventually made without Spielberg's involvement and released in 2016 under the title Rules Don't Apply.

=== Ultimatum ===
As reported in August 1990, Spielberg was interested in directing Ultimatum, a 1980 spec script by Robert Roy Pool and Laurence Dworet about "a presidential adviser battling terrorists." The script was sold for $500,000 after the success of The Hunt for Red October.

=== The Curious Case of Benjamin Button ===
In 1991, Spielberg was slated to make a film adaptation of F. Scott Fitzgerald's 1922 short story The Curious Case of Benjamin Button for Universal Pictures, with Tom Cruise playing the titular role. However, Spielberg dropped out due to his commitment with the films Hook (1991), Jurassic Park (1993) and Schindler's List (1993).

=== Shrek ===
Also in 1991, Spielberg bought the rights to William Steig's 1990 children's book Shrek!. Spielberg originally envisioned his adaptation as a traditionally animated film from Amblin Entertainment, with Bill Murray as the voice of the titular character and Steve Martin as the voice of Donkey. Despite co-founding DreamWorks Animation—the eventual owner of the Shrek franchise—in 1994, Spielberg moved on to other projects.

=== Thunder Below ===
As early as 1992, Spielberg was interested in directing a film for DreamWorks based on the World War II biography Thunder Below! by Eugene B. Fluckey. He turned to Shane Salerno to write the screenplay, who later described this collaboration as his "writing school".

=== The Bridges of Madison County ===
Also around 1992, Spielberg considered making The Bridges of Madison County his next film following Schindler's List. By 1994, he backed out to take a year off after working on Jurassic Park and Schindler's List back-to-back.

=== Why Can't I Be Audrey Hepburn? ===
According to Ryan Murphy on his appearance on the radio program Fresh Air with Terry Gross, Murphy sold a script he wrote to Spielberg called Why Can't I Be Audrey Hepburn? about a woman who is obsessed with famous film actress Audrey Hepburn, who was left at the altar and who then meets a man just as Audrey-centric as she. The film was going to star Téa Leoni and Jennifer Love Hewitt as different roles. Spielberg was interested in making it, but the film's production was canceled after nothing new came out of it, and Spielberg had a lot of other projects in the 1990s he was busy working on.

=== The Little Things ===
Spielberg was attached to direct the film in 1993, with John Lee Hancock writing the screenplay. Spielberg would exit the project, deeming the story too dark. Hancock would assume the director chair himself, and the film would be released in 2021 starring Denzel Washington, Rami Malek and Jared Leto.

=== In Dreams ===
According to screenwriter Bruce Robinson, after Jennifer 8, he wrote the serial killer film In Dreams for Spielberg, which ended up being rewritten and directed by Neil Jordan instead.

=== Pirates of the Caribbean ===
In the mid-1990s, Spielberg acquired a copy of an early Pirates of the Caribbean draft based on the theme park attraction, written by Ted Elliott and Terry Rossio. Amblin bought the script, and Bill Murray, Steve Martin and Robin Williams were on Spielberg's mind for the Jack Sparrow role, but Disney did not care for his take on the material. A completely different script, also written by Elliott and Rossio, would eventually see production in the 2000s, with Johnny Depp in the Sparrow role under direction of Gore Verbinski.

=== Meet the Parents ===
It was reported that back in 1996, Spielberg was slated to direct Jim Carrey in a remake of Greg Glienna's 1992 film Meet the Parents for Universal Pictures. However, Spielberg, along with Carrey, left the project due to schedule conflicts. Spielberg's company DreamWorks served as a co-distributor of the 2000 remake.

=== The Haunting ===
Stephen King recalled in the late 1990s that Spielberg attempted to direct a remake of the 1963 film, with King serving as screenwriter. However, King left the project due to creative differences with Spielberg. As a result, Jan De Bont directed the film instead and Spielberg executive produced it under the Amblin umbrella.It was distributed by DreamWorks.

=== Mozart and the Whale ===
Development on Mozart and the Whale first began around 1997, when Spielberg was set to direct the film at DreamWorks, with Robin Williams interested in starring. The screenplay was written by Ron Bass based on the real-life story of Jerry and Mary Newport.

=== The Mask of Zorro ===
Spielberg briefly considered directing The Mask of Zorro through DreamWorks, but opted instead to helm Saving Private Ryan. After watching The Red Squirrel, Stanley Kubrick advised Spielberg to hire Julio Medem to direct the film. Spielberg contacted Medem, but the Spanish filmmaker rejected the opportunity, and the job eventually went to Martin Campbell.

=== The Mark ===
In January 1998, Spielberg signed on to direct Rob Liefeld's spec script The Mark, with Will Smith set to star, until Smith told Liefeld that Spielberg dropped out due to production and merchandising complications, which Liefeld revealed on a 2015 Twitter thread.

=== Memoirs of a Geisha ===
Although he served as a producer of the film, Spielberg initially signed on to direct the adaptation of Arthur Golden's novel Memoirs of a Geisha in April 1998. He decided not to direct it when he agreed to direct A.I. Artificial Intelligence instead.

=== Lindbergh ===
Also in 1998, Spielberg and DreamWorks purchased the rights to A. Scott Berg's biography Lindbergh, which Paul Attanasio was hired to adapt. "I didn't know very much about [Lindbergh] until I read Scott Berg's book and I read it only after I purchased it," he told The New York Times Magazine in 1999. "I think it's one of the greatest biographies I've ever read but his America First and his anti-Semitism bothers me to my core, and I don't want to celebrate an anti-Semite unless I can create an understanding of why he felt that way. Because sometimes the best way to prevent discrimination is to understand the discriminator."

=== The Notebook ===
In 1998, Spielberg was eyeing to direct The Notebook for New Line Cinema as a possible next project. Jeremy Leven wrote the script, based on the novel of the same name by Nicholas Sparks. Spielberg wished to film it with Tom Cruise playing Noah Calhoun, but his commitment to other projects led him to step away by the following year. The adaptation was eventually made by Nick Cassavetes in 2004.

=== I'll Be Home ===
In February 1999, Spielberg announced that he was working on an autobiographical film, entitled I'll Be Home, written by his sister Anne. Spielberg himself, in collaboration with Tony Kushner, later wrote the 2022 autobiographical film The Fabelmans.

=== The Big Ticket ===
In June 1999, it was reported that Gore Verbinski was in final negotiations to direct The Big Ticket for DreamWorks, based on an idea conceived by Spielberg. Jim Herzfeld wrote the script which centers on a man who is obsessed with watching car chases on the evening news.

== 2000s ==
=== Harry Potter and the Philosopher's Stone ===
Prior to Chris Columbus's official involvement, Spielberg was considered to direct Harry Potter and the Philosopher's Stone. Spielberg stated in 2012: "I was offered Harry Potter. I developed it for about five or six months with Steve Kloves, and then I dropped out." Spielberg wanted to combine the Harry Potter books into an animated film, but Warner Bros. Pictures president Alan F. Horn objected. Spielberg also wanted Haley Joel Osment to portray the titular character. Spielberg ultimately backed out as director due to creative differences with J. K. Rowling. He went on to direct A.I. Artificial Intelligence instead.

=== The Curse of Monkey Island ===
In the start of 2000, Spielberg was set to make his first animated feature film based on the Lucasarts video game series Monkey Island, a game series he was a fan of at the time. Spielberg was set to direct, produce and co-write the screenplay with Ted Elliott, with concept art by the original game's designer Steve Purcell and animator Tony Stacchi, executive produced by Spielberg's best friend and founder of the game's developer, George Lucas.

=== Big Fish ===
In August 2000, Spielberg was in talks to direct an adaptation of Daniel Wallace's novel Big Fish: A Novel of Mythic Proportions. Spielberg reportedly wanted Jack Nicholson to portray Edward Bloom. However, he dropped out of the project and was replaced by Tim Burton, who ended up directing the film.

=== Ghost Soldiers ===
On January 24, 2002, it was reported that Spielberg would direct an adaptation of Hampton Sides's book Ghost Soldiers with Josh Friedman writing the script and Tom Cruise was set to star in and produce the film.

=== Arkansas ===
In August 2002, Empire cited the abandoned western Arkansas that Spielberg was involved and Tom Cruise was in talks to star in the film.

=== Spares ===
In August 2002, a project called Spares based on the Michael Marshall Smith novel of the same name about human clones was also cited as a possible collaboration by Spielberg and Tom Cruise.

=== Ikiru remake ===
In November 2002, it was reported that Spielberg and DreamWorks decided to produce a remake of the 1952 Japanese film Ikiru, by Akira Kurosawa. In March 2003, Tom Hanks signed on to star in the film as the dying old man, and novelist Richard Price was in talks to write the screenplay. The film was expected to begin production sometime the following year. In 2008, it was reported that Spielberg was possibly eyeing to direct the film. An unrelated English-language remake, Living, was released in 2022, directed by Oliver Hermanus.

=== The Rivals ===
On May 21, 2003, Spielberg was set to direct and produce the film The Rivals for Paramount Pictures, with Robin Swicord writing. It was revealed that Nicole Kidman and Gwyneth Paltrow were set to play Sarah Bernhardt and Eleanor Duse, until Marion Cotillard replaced Paltrow. In 2008, Spielberg left the project due to DreamWorks Pictures' split from Paramount, which still has the project.

=== The Secret Life of Walter Mitty ===
John Goldwyn recalled in the spring of 2003 that Spielberg expressed interest in directing the remake of The Secret Life of Walter Mitty (1947) for Paramount Pictures, on the condition that Jim Carrey play the titular role. However, Paramount put the project in turnaround by the end of 2003. The film was eventually remade in 2013, with Ben Stiller serving as director in addition to playing the titular role.

=== The Catcher in the Rye ===
It was reported in 2003 that Spielberg attempted to direct a film adaptation of J. D. Salinger's novel The Catcher in the Rye, but could not obtain the rights from Salinger.

=== The Time Traveler's Wife ===
Around 2004, Spielberg briefly expressed interest in directing the film adaptation of Audrey Niffenegger's The Time Traveler's Wife. As of 2005, Robert Schwentke had entered final negotiations to direct it, and the film was released in 2009.

=== The Goonies sequel ===
On June 6, 2005, Richard Donner stated that he and Spielberg had written a story for a film sequel of Donner's acclaimed The Goonies, despite the fact that the main cast did not have any interest in reprising their roles for a sequel.

=== Man About Town ===
According to screenwriter Mike Binder, Spielberg was once attached to direct his 2006 Lionsgate film Man About Town, before allegedly backing out and later blocking its star, Ben Affleck, from taking part. The project initially started as a collaboration between the two after the success of Binder's The Upside of Anger. "We were talking about power and the struggles, and he was going through a thing where someone broke into his house—it was crazy. So I wrote this thing for him," Binder recalled. They spent months developing the screenplay at DreamWorks, but just as it was heading toward production, Spielberg suddenly backed away. "He called me and said, 'I got bad news. I'm not making this movie. Kate [Capshaw] talked me out of it. It's too autobiographical," he explained. Spielberg then went on to recommend that Binder direct the film.

=== Interstellar ===
The film began development in June 2006, when Spielberg and Paramount Pictures announced plans for a science fiction film based on an eight-page treatment written by Lynda Obst and Kip Thorne. Obst was attached to produce. By March 2007, Jonathan Nolan was hired to write a screenplay. After Spielberg moved his production studio DreamWorks from Paramount to Walt Disney Studios in 2009, Paramount needed a new director for Interstellar. Jonathan Nolan recommended his brother Christopher Nolan, who joined the project in 2012. Spielberg would end up praising the final film from Nolan in 2026 and stated that it "was a much better movie in Chris Nolan’s hands than it would have been in mine."

=== The Trial of the Chicago 7 ===
In July 2007, Aaron Sorkin wrote a script entitled The Trial of the Chicago 7, based on the conspiracy trial of the Chicago 7. Producers Spielberg, Walter F. Parkes and Laurie MacDonald collaborated on the development of Sorkin's script, with Spielberg intending to direct the film. Sacha Baron Cohen was originally cast as Abbie Hoffman, while Spielberg approached Will Smith for the role of Bobby Seale, and planned to meet with Heath Ledger about playing Tom Hayden. The Writers Guild of America strike, which started in November 2007 and lasted 100 days, delayed filming and the project was suspended until October 2018, when Sorkin was announced as the director of the film.

=== Oldboy ===
Spielberg was attached to adapt the manga Old Boy in the late 2000s. Will Smith was set to star and it was reported to be based on the manga not the earlier film adaptation. The project was abandoned due to rights issues. The film ended up being released on November 27, 2013, directed by Spike Lee and starring Josh Brolin.

=== The 39 Clues ===
In June 2008, DreamWorks acquired the screen rights to The 39 Clues adventure series, with Spielberg eyeing the project as a possible directing vehicle, prior to the first novel's publication. Both Spielberg and Scholastic Media president Deborah Forte were set to produce film adaptations of all ten planned books. By September that year, Jeff Nathanson was set as the screenwriter of the first installment in the series, reteaming with Spielberg for the fourth time. Brett Ratner and Shawn Levy both later became attached to direct at different times, before the rights were bought by Universal, in August 2013.

=== Chocky ===
In September 2008, The Hollywood Reporter reported that Spielberg had acquired the rights of John Wyndham's novelette Chocky to make a film adaptation of it. However, no updates were made after this announcement.

=== Untitled Martin Luther King Jr. biopic ===
On May 19, 2009, it was reported that Spielberg was to make a film about the life of civil rights activist Martin Luther King Jr. after buying the rights to his life story. Spielberg said of the project in 2013: "I wouldn't call it a biopic, it's more a story of King and the movement and also about how his admiration for Mahatma Gandhi helped to shape his moral core." As of March 15, 2018, Spielberg still holds the rights to King's story.

=== Untitled Horace Greasley biopic ===
On June 15, 2009, it was reported that Spielberg was to make a film about British Army private Horace Greasley, who claimed to have secretly escaped and returned to Nazi German prisoner-of-war camps 200 times during World War II. However, no updates were made after this announcement.

=== Matt Helm ===
On July 30, 2009, it was reported that Spielberg was considering directing or producing a serious rebooting of the Matt Helm franchise, rewritten by Paul Attanasio.

=== Harvey ===
On August 2, 2009, Spielberg stated that he would direct a film adaptation of the play Harvey. Will Smith, Robert Downey Jr. and Tom Hanks were considered to play the lead role, while Jonathan Tropper was hired to write the screenplay. DreamWorks and 20th Century Fox would have developed the film. However, Collider confirmed on December 4, 2009, that the project was cancelled due to problems with the lead role selection.

=== Pirate Latitudes ===
On August 27, 2009, Spielberg announced his intention to adapt the Michael Crichton novel Pirate Latitudes, reportedly having wanted to make a pirate film. Spielberg hired David Koepp to pen the screenplay. Anil Ambani's Reliance Big Entertainment and Spielberg's DreamWorks Studios will produce the film, which will be the third of Crichton's novels Spielberg has adapted, after the highly successful Jurassic Park films. This project is still in development.

== 2010s ==
=== Untitled George Gershwin biopic ===
On January 31, 2010, it was reported that Spielberg was going to direct a biopic about the life of composer George Gershwin, with Zachary Quinto portraying him and Doug Wright writing. Principal photography for the biopic was slated to begin in April that same year, but it never came to fruition. On February 20, 2013, it was reported that Spielberg was still interested in making a biopic about Gershwin's life. Later, in 2026, Spielberg stated he had been deep in pre-production and had cast Colman Domingo as Todd Duncan but ultimately opted not to make it.

=== Robopocalypse ===
On October 22, 2010, Spielberg had signed on to direct a film adaptation of Daniel H. Wilson's novel Robopocalypse, with Drew Goddard writing. Chris Hemsworth, Anne Hathaway and Ben Whishaw had signed on to star in the film. However, on January 9, 2013, Robopocalypse was placed on hold indefinitely, mainly because of its production expenses. The next day, Spielberg clarified he was working on a new script that would be "more economically but also much more personally". In July 2015, concept artwork was leaked onto the Internet. On March 7, 2018, Michael Bay signed on to direct the adaptation.

=== A Steady Rain ===
On July 21, 2011, it was reported that Spielberg was going to direct the film adaptation of Keith Huff's A Steady Rain, with Hugh Jackman set to reprise his role.

=== Gods and Kings ===
On November 15, 2011, it was reported that Spielberg was in talks with Warner Bros. Pictures to direct Gods and Kings, a biopic about the life of Moses. On March 4, 2013, it was confirmed that Spielberg dropped out of the project.

=== American Sniper ===
On May 2, 2013, it was announced that Spielberg had signed on to direct the film adaptation of Chris Kyle's 2012 autobiography American Sniper. However, on August 5 that same year, it was announced that Spielberg left the project due to a budget disagreement between him and Warner Bros. Pictures.

=== Thank You for Your Service ===
On June 4, 2013, it was first reported that Spielberg was considering to direct a film adaptation of David Finkel's 2013 nonfiction book Thank You for Your Service, with Daniel Day-Lewis attached to star. Then, on February 20, 2015, it was reported that Spielberg might direct the film later that year. Finally, in June 2015, it was officially announced that the film's screenwriter Jason Hall would direct the film, after Hall convinced Spielberg to let him direct.

=== Montezuma ===
On January 6, 2014, Spielberg was considering directing Montezuma as his next possible project, based on a 50-year-old script by Dalton Trumbo about the collision between Emperor Moctezuma II and Hernán Cortés, which was reportedly being rewritten by Steve Zaillian. Javier Bardem was attached to play Cortés, and Zaillian was to produce the film alongside Spielberg. This was later redeveloped into the Amazon series Cortes, which was cancelled during filming due to the COVID-19 pandemic.

=== It's What I Do ===
On March 2, 2015, Spielberg had signed on to direct a film adaptation of Lynsey Addario's memoir It's What I Do: A Photographer's Life of Love and War, with Jennifer Lawrence set to star as Addario. However, Spielberg and Lawrence moved on from the film. On October 24, 2018, Ridley Scott signed on to direct, with Scarlett Johansson set to star as Addario, until Johansson dropped out the following day, after finding out it was funded by the Saudi crown prince, Mohammed bin Salman.

=== The Kidnapping of Edgardo Mortara ===
On April 11, 2016, it was announced that Spielberg would direct a film adaptation of David Kertzer's book The Kidnapping of Edgardo Mortara, with Tony Kushner serving as screenwriter and Mark Rylance portraying Pope Pius IX. The book is based on the true story of Jewish-Italian Edgardo Mortara, who was kidnapped and forced to convert to the Catholic Church. Oscar Isaac was to have portrayed the adult Mortara in Spielberg's movie. Spielberg planned to start filming in February 2017 but, after having trouble finding a six-year-old boy to play the film's lead, he cancelled the project in favor of directing The Post (2017) upon reading Liz Hannah and Josh Singer's script.

=== Maestro ===
Spielberg considered directing the Leonard Bernstein biopic Maestro, and had approached Bradley Cooper to star. When Spielberg decided not to, Cooper said he wanted to "throw his hat in the ring" as a possible director. By 2018, Cooper was firmly attached as both actor and director after Spielberg saw a pre-release screening of his film A Star Is Born.

=== Untitled Ulysses S. Grant biopic ===
On May 17, 2018, it was announced Spielberg was negotiating to direct a biopic of President Ulysses S. Grant, which would see Leonardo DiCaprio play Grant and David James Kelly writing the screenplay. Since then, no new announcements on the project have been made.

=== Spielberg's After Dark ===
On June 9, 2019, Jeffrey Katzenberg announced in a press conference at the Banff World Media Festival that Spielberg was writing a horror series for Katzenberg's then-upcoming service, Quibi. Spielberg requested that the program only be available to watch after sunset. In October 2020, it was announced that Quibi was shutting down, leaving the fate of the series in question.

== 2020s ==
=== Untitled Frank Bullitt film ===
In February 2022, Deadline Hollywood reported that Spielberg was developing an original film centered around the character Frank Bullitt, a fictional San Francisco police officer originally portrayed by Steve McQueen in the 1968 film Bullitt. The screenplay was set to be written by Josh Singer, who previously co-wrote The Post for Spielberg. McQueen's son Chad and granddaughter Molly were to both serve as executive producers. Spielberg had hoped to shoot the film following West Side Story, but due to the negotiations with McQueen's estate taking longer than expected, he chose to direct The Fabelmans first instead. In November, it was announced Bradley Cooper was cast to portray the titular character, and would also join as a producer alongside Spielberg and Kristie Macosko Krieger.

=== The Fabelmans sequel ===
During a virtual conversation with Indian filmmaker S. S. Rajamouli in February 2023, Spielberg said that he will not rule out the possibility of a sequel to The Fabelmans, but confirmed that there are currently no immediate plans.

=== The Thursday Murder Club ===
Also in 2023, Spielberg had eyed directing The Thursday Murder Club as his next film, before the SAG-AFTRA strike halted his plans. At the time, Meryl Streep and Viola Davis were circling two of the lead roles, but when Spielberg stepped back and took credit as an executive producer instead, both actresses subsequently dropped out. They were replaced by Helen Mirren and Celia Imrie, and the film was ultimately directed by Chris Columbus.

=== Untitled Western film ===
In a 2025 interview with The Hollywood Reporter conducted soon after he completed Disclosure Day, Spielberg made it clear that he was already thinking about his next project, which was coming from "an appetite [to make] a Western"; something he said that's "eluded [him] for all of these decades." During the 2026 SXSW Film Festival, Spielberg stated that it would subvert the classic mythology of the American frontier without relying on the genre's typical stereotypes.

=== Call of Duty ===
According to a report from Puck News, Spielberg had pushed to direct Activision's live action film version of the blockbuster gaming franchise Call of Duty. However, the pitch presented by Spielberg and his team at Amblin was rejected over demands of top-of-market pay, final cut, and full creative and marketing control. Instead, Activision executives were said to have favored a pitch from Paramount's David Ellison that gave the company far more oversight. A deal was then struck with Paramount in September 2025.

== Offers ==
=== MacArthur ===
Spielberg turned down the offer to direct MacArthur, a biopic about the life of Douglas MacArthur.

=== The Taking of Pelham One Two Three ===
Spielberg also turned down the offer to direct The Taking of Pelham One Two Three (1974).

=== Star Trek: Planet of the Titans ===
Spielberg was asked to direct Star Trek: Planet of the Titans, but was too busy at the time to accept the offer.

=== Altered States ===
Spielberg turned down the offer to direct Altered States after Arthur Penn left due to creative differences. Ken Russell took his place, and the film was released in 1980.

=== Return of the Jedi ===
Spielberg's longtime friend George Lucas originally wanted him to direct the third entry of the original Star Wars trilogy, Star Wars: Episode VI - Return of the Jedi (1983) and Spielberg was eager to do so, but Lucas was unsuccessful in getting him the job because of his dispute with the Director's Guild at the time.

=== A Day with Wilbur Robinson ===
Spielberg was offered by author William Joyce to direct a live action adaptation of his book A Day with Wilbur Robinson, He turned it down, and the film became Meet the Robinsons.

=== The Truman Show ===
Spielberg was among the list of filmmakers considered to direct the film, before Peter Weir officially assumed the position.

=== Star Wars: Episode I – The Phantom Menace ===
In the 1990s, George Lucas met with Spielberg, Robert Zemeckis and Ron Howard at different times to possibly direct Star Wars: Episode I – The Phantom Menace. Howard revealed on a 2015 Happy Sad Confused podcast episode that they each turned the offer down because they wanted Lucas to direct the film instead.

== Producer only ==
=== Congo ===
In 1982, Spielberg signed on to produce an adaptation of the Michael Crichton novel Congo when Brian De Palma became attached to direct the film.

=== Carpool ===
In 1986, it was reported that Spielberg was set to produce Robert Zemeckis and Bob Gale's script Carpool, to be directed by Brian De Palma.

=== Untitled Jeremiah S. Chechik film ===
Sometime in the 1980s,

=== The Realm ===
In the 1990s, Spielberg reunited with fellow Cal State alumna Claudia Salter on a project she wrote for Amblin Entertainment titled The Realm, which she had developed along with producer Andrea McCall.

=== Doom's IV ===
In January 1993, Variety reported that Amblin Entertainment had signed a deal with comics creator Rob Liefeld to develop a multimedia franchise to produce a feature film called Doom's IV, which would see Liefeld's studio producing a comic book tie-in, and Liefeld himself possibly providing character designs for the film. While several issues of the comic book were released in 1994, The film never went into production.

=== Creepy Karpis ===
In March 1993,

=== Body Language ===
In 1994,

=== Cats ===
Spielberg planned to adapt an animated musical of the play with his former animation studio Amblimation. It would have been set in World War II, but was abandoned following the studio's closure in 1997.

=== Mort the Dead Teenager ===
In April 1997, Spielberg and Robert Zemeckis were attached to produce a film version of Mort the Dead Teenager at DreamWorks, with Jim Cooper writing the script. Elijah Wood was in talks for the starring role of Mort and Dominique Swain as his love interest.

=== Alvin and the Chipmunks ===
In June 1997, it was reported that Robert Zemeckis had a film in development at Universal based on Alvin and the Chipmunks, which Spielberg was attached to produce.

=== The Martian Chronicles ===
Also in 1997, Spielberg and John Davis were producing a film adaptation of Ray Bradbury's The Martian Chronicles for Universal Pictures. Michael Tolkin and John Orloff were some of the writers who worked on a script, which failed to get off the ground. In 2011, Paramount Pictures acquired the rights to produce a film franchise with Davis producing through Davis Entertainment.

=== Bad Dog ===
In November 1997,

=== Inspector Gadget ===
Prior to the release of the 1999 Disney film Inspector Gadget, Spielberg was at one point slated to produce a film adaptation of the 1980s animated series of the same name, his two choices were either Chevy Chase or Steve Martin as Inspector Gadget.

=== St. Agnes' Stand ===
On April 17, 2003, Spielberg optioned the rights to Thomas Eidson's novel St. Agnes' Stand, and was going to produce with Martin Scorsese directing the film and Charles Randolph writing the script.

=== The Adventures of Tintin sequels ===
Before the release of The Adventures of Tintin, the plan to make sequels was asserted as early as 2007, with Spielberg set to produce this time, and Peter Jackson directing. In 2011, Jackson said he planned to shoot the film following his work on The Hobbit films. By 2018, no production on the sequels had been made, with Spielberg and Jackson both individually asserting their intentions to continue the franchise. In 2026, Jackson stated that the Tintin sequel film would be his next directorial endeavor and that he had completed the script.

=== Napoleon TV miniseries ===
In March 2013, Spielberg announced that he was developing a miniseries based on the life of Napoleon. In May 2016, it was announced that Cary Fukunaga is in talks to direct the miniseries for HBO, from a script by David Leland, based on extensive research materials accumulated by Stanley Kubrick over the years.

=== The Grapes of Wrath ===
In July 2013, it was reported that Spielberg was interested in producing a film adaptation of the John Steinbeck novel The Grapes of Wrath. Daniel Day-Lewis was slated to star in Spielberg's adaptation. However, the film was prevented from being made due to a rights issue between Steinbeck's surviving relatives.

=== The Bully Pulpit ===
In October 2013,

=== Like Father, Like Son remake ===
It was indicated by The New York Times that Spielberg had hired Chris and Paul Weitz to write an English-language adaptation of the Japanese film Like Father, Like Son, for him to produce.

=== The Last Starfighter remake ===
According to Seth Rogen, in November 2014, Spielberg tried and failed to secure the rights to produce a remake of the 1980s sci-fi film The Last Starfighter.

=== Destiny ===
In 2015,

=== The Voyeur's Motel ===
In April 2016, it was reported that Spielberg would produce Sam Mendes' film adaptation of the Gay Talese novel and article The Voyeur's Motel. In November 2016, the film was cancelled because of the documentary Voyeur.

=== Powerhouse ===
In May 2016,

=== Untitled Walter Cronkite biopic ===
On June 14, 2016,

=== Aleister Arcane ===
On June 21, 2016,

=== The Fall ===
In July 2016,

=== Intelligent Life ===
On October 4, 2016,

=== My Magical Life ===
On October 27, 2016,

=== A Hope More Powerful than the Sea ===
On October 29, 2018, Spielberg and J. J. Abrams were reported to co-produce the film adaptation of Melissa Fleming's A Hope More Powerful than the Sea about Doaa Al Zamel's escape from the Syrian Civil War, with Lena Dunham writing the script.

=== The Mother Code ===
In March 2019,

=== Untitled Bee Gees biopic ===
In November 2019,

=== Big Tree ===
In June 2022,

=== Ultra ===
In December 2022,

=== Leopoldstadt ===
In May 2023,

=== Untitled Martin Luther King Jr. biopic ===
In October 2023,

=== Long Lost ===
In January 2024,

=== Ready Player Two ===
In March 2024, Spielberg confirmed that an adaptation of Ready Player Two, the sequel novel to Ready Player One, was in development with him producing.

=== Untitled Transformers/G. I. Joe crossover film ===
In April 2024,

=== The Heaven & Earth Grocery Store ===
In May 2024,

=== The Challenger TV series ===
On June 7, 2024,

=== James ===
On June 20, 2024, it was revealed that Taika Waititi was in talks to direct a film adaptation of the Percival Everett novel James with Spielberg executive producing through Amblin Entertainment.

=== Cola Wars ===
In September 2024,

== See also ==
- Steven Spielberg filmography
