= Donato and Daughter =

- VHS cover
- Also known as: Dead to Rights
- Genre: Crime drama
- Based on: Donato & Daughter by Jack Early
- Teleplay by: Robert Roy Pool
- Directed by: Rod Holcomb
- Starring: Charles Bronson; Dana Delany
- Music by: Sylvester Levay
- Country of origin: United States
- Original language: English

Production
- Executive producer: Neil Russell
- Producers: Marian Brayton; Anne Carlucci
- Cinematography: Thomas Del Ruth
- Editor: Christopher Nelson
- Running time: 90 minutes
- Production companies: Multimedia Motion Pictures; ARD Degeto Film

Original release
- Network: CBS
- Release: September 21, 1993

Donato and Daughter, released on video as Dead to Rights, is a 1993 American crime drama television film directed by Rod Holcomb and written by Robert Roy Pool, based on the 1988 novel by Jack Early. It stars Charles Bronson and Dana Delany as a father and daughter, both LAPD detectives, who must team up to stop a serial killer. It aired on CBS on September 21, 1993.

The project appealed to Delany because of its focus on the relationship between father and daughter, which she found more compelling than the typical overdone serial killer plots. She appreciated the absence of a romantic subplot, valuing the opportunity to portray a strong, multifaceted female character centered on family and work. Delany also took the role to work with Charles Bronson, describing him as tough but sweet and funny, often lightening tense moments with impromptu musical performances. To prepare for her role, Delany spent time with police officers.

== Plot ==
Two Los Angeles Police Department detectives, a father and daughter who have had a frosty relationship for a long time, must team up to stop a brutal sexual predator and serial killer who targets nuns.

== Cast ==
- Charles Bronson as Sergeant Mike Donato
- Dana Delany as Lieutenant Dena Donato
- Xander Berkeley as Russ Loring
- Jenette Goldstein as Detective Judy McCartney
- Louis Giambalvo as Chief Hugh Halliday
- Marc Alaimo as Detective Petsky
- Tom Verica as Bobby Keegan
- Robert Gossett as Detective Bobbins
- Bonnie Bartlett as Renata Donato
- Julianna McCarthy as Adele Loring
- Patti Yasutake as Dr. Stewart
- Richard Kuss as Chief Stone
- Michael Cavanaugh as Vinnie Stellino
- Kim Weeks as Andrea Loring

== Production ==
The film is based on a book by the same name by Jack Early.

Delany said that the story appealed to her because "it was the relationship between the two that interested me. We see so many movies now about serial killers, it's really being overdone, so I wanted to emphasize the relationship between father and daughter."

Also she liked that they were no romantic subplot by saying "why is it that in every movie, there has to be a male female thing going on? Why can't it be about a woman and her family and her work? That was the challenge because you want her to be strong and capable, but you also don't want her to be one-dimensional."

Finally she accepted the project because she wanted to work with Charles Bronson. Of the actor she said she "wanted to work with Charles Bronson because he's kind of an icon. It was fun, but he's a tough nut to crack, not easy to get to know. But underneath it all he's a very sweet man, and quite funny."

On his performance Delany added "you watch Charlie with a gun in his hands and you know he's done it so many times, it's so natural to him, this is probably the most talking he's done in a while. He got down. There's an emotional confrontation between us. He did not try to avoid it." She also added that when things got tense on set Bronson would perform impromptu musical numbers to ease the atmosphere.

Delany spent time with cops to prepare for the role.

== Reception ==
Susan Stewart of the Detroit Free Press gave three stars. She wrote that while there is no subtlety it is highly entertaining. Her final consensus was that "it helps that the photography is fabulous, the sets full of quietly significant details, and the score, something you almost never notice on a cop show, is moody in the extreme. "Donato" has elements of the great British TV drama Prime Suspect; Delany might have taken lessons from Helen Mirren for her tortured, chain-smoking tough gal character. But Delany is so good, she doesn't seem derivative. In the end, Bronson does what Bronson does best, and you want to cheer."

In Kay Gardella's review published in The Gazette, she wrote that while superior cop dramas do exist it was involving one. Of the actors, she says "Delany and Bronson work well together. Bronson shows a warmer, more caring side than his usual tough-guy image allows. And Delany, as attractive as ever, is crisp and efficient as cop."

In his Los Angeles Times review, Jon Matsumoto gave the film credit for trying "to inject some complex human interaction into its standard mystery-thriller format. But alas this film is so unconvincing as a relationship movie that you end up wishing it had solely been a thrill-packed whodunit." He appreciated Xander Berkeley's performance saying that he "brings the right dose of crazed intelligence to his role of the psychopath."
