= The Big Town (1987 film) =

1987 film by Harold Becker

- Theatrical release poster
- Directed by: Ben Bolt; Harold Becker (uncredited)
- Screenplay by: Robert Roy Pool
- Based on: novel The Arm by Clark Howard
- Produced by: Martin Ransohoff
- Starring: Matt Dillon; Diane Lane; Tommy Lee Jones; Bruce Dern; Tom Skerritt; Lee Grant; Suzy Amis
- Cinematography: Ralf D. Bode
- Edited by: Stuart H. Pappé
- Music by: Michael Melvoin; Frank Fitzpatrick (Music Editor)
- Production company: Albacore Productions Inc.
- Distributed by: Columbia Pictures
- Release date: September 25, 1987
- Running time: 109 minutes
- Country: United States
- Language: English
- Budget: $10 million or $17 million
- Box office: $1,733,000

The Big Town is a 1987 American neo-noir thriller film about a young man who comes to the big city to work as a professional gambler, in the process becoming romantically involved with two women—one of whom is already married. The film was directed by Ben Bolt and Harold Becker (uncredited) and it stars Matt Dillon, Diane Lane, and Tommy Lee Jones.

== Plot ==
In 1957, J. C. Cullen is a small-town crapshooter who heads to Chicago, Illinois, to seek his fortune. There he becomes the pawn of two high-rolling professional gamblers, Mr. and Mrs. Edwards. He later gets mixed-up in a revenge scheme cooked up by Lorry Dane, the embittered stripper wife of strip-joint owner George Cole. Before he knows what's happened, Cullen is embroiled in two torrid romances: one with Dane and the other with nice girl Aggie Donaldson. He also nearly loses his life by ending up in the middle of a deadly feud between Edwards, Cole, and Phil Carpenter, the man Mr. Edwards accuses of causing him to lose his eyesight.

== Main cast ==
Actor	Role
Matt Dillon	J. C. Cullen
Diane Lane	Lorry Dane
Tommy Lee Jones	George Cole
Bruce Dern	Mr. Edwards
Lee Grant	Ferguson Edwards
Tom Skerritt	Phil Carpenter
Suzy Amis	Aggie Donaldson
David Marshall Grant	Sonny Binkley
Don Francks	Carl Hooker
Del Close	Deacon Daniels
Cherry Jones	Ginger McDonald
David James Elliott	Cool Guy (as David Elliott)
Chris Benson	Shooter

== Production ==
The film was based on the Clark Howard novel The Arm, published in 1967. In October 1967 it was announced Peter Thomas would produce a film version of the novel from a script by Dennis Murphy for CBS Films. No film resulted. The novel was published in paperback in 1970.

In 1986 producer Martin Ransohoff signed a three-picture deal with Columbia and Vestron Video, off the back of Ransohoff's success with Jagged Edge (1985). The first film he wanted to make was an adaptation of The Arm. Matt Dillon signed to star.

Ransohoff had previously made The Hustler, about pool sharks, and The Cincinnati Kid, about poker; The Arm was about dice. Ransohoff said, "I made The Cincinnati Kid 20 years ago, and I was amused at the possibility of filling in a third - pool, poker and craps, they're sort of the three major areas of table gambling. This area of dice hadn't been dealt with." Ransohoff admitted he was unhappy with the title of the novel. "We're reviewing it because people are misled. Some people think it's a sequel to The Natural. Others think it deals with druggies. Whatever it's called, this could do it for Matt Dillon like Hustler did for Paul Newman and Cincinnati Kid for Steve McQueen."

Filming took place in Toronto, Canada. The original director was Harold Becker. He left the film during production and was replaced by Ben Bolt. Bolt was a suggestion of Columbia's new head of production, David Puttnam, who had started his job after the film had been greenlit.

Filming finished several weeks later than originally intended, meaning Diane Lane (who previously co-starred with Matt Dillon in The Outsiders and Rumble Fish) had to miss out on a theatre job she had lined up.

Dillon said, "it's not really about a kid but about growth. Umm, he's a small-town guy who outgrows the town. He's nocturnal, a gambler who shoots dice all night - but he's got a certain amount of naïveté. He's naive. He's not a dark character, even though he lives in the dark. He's honest even though he doesn't make an honest living. He's got purity."

== Reception ==
=== Critical ===
The film received a mixed reception. Audiences polled by CinemaScore gave the film an average grade of "C+" on an A+ to F scale.

The Los Angeles Times said the film "is so entertaining, so true to its period that it's easy to peg it as another '50s nostalgia piece when it actually possesses the kind of complexity usually associated with less commercial, less starry productions. It is very much in the spirit that former Columbia Pictures Chairman David Puttnam said he wanted to bring to Hollywood. The film also marks a terrific screen coming of age for Matt Dillon, who for the first time seems more man than boy, and it is a strong directorial debut for Ben Bolt... Robert Bolt. No element, however, is more impressive than Robert Roy Pool's superlative script." On Rotten Tomatoes, the film has an aggregated score of 50% based on 4 positive and 4 negative reviews.

=== Box office ===
The movie was not a box office success, earning less than $2 million.

=== Soundtrack ===
The soundtrack to the film includes Ronnie Self's composition "Big Town,"

== Notes ==
- Yule, Andrew (1989). Fast fade : David Puttnam, Columbia Pictures, and the battle for Hollywood. Delacorte Press. ISBN 9780440501770.
