= Robert Roy Pool =

American screenwriter (born 1953)

Robert Roy Pool (born 1953) is an American screenwriter, best known for his authorship of the motion pictures Outbreak (1995), starring Dustin Hoffman, and The Big Town (1987), starring Matt Dillon. He also received a "story by" credit on the motion picture Armageddon (1998), which starred Bruce Willis and Billy Bob Thornton. Pool has collaborated with Laurence Dworet, a former emergency department doctor, on multiple scripts including the unproduced Ultimatum.

== Filmography ==
Year	Film	Credit	Notes
1987	The Big Town	Screenplay By	Based on the novel "The Arm" by Clark Howard
1993	Donato and Daughter	Screenplay By	Based on the novel of the same name by Jack Early
1995	Outbreak	Written By	Co-Wrote screenplay with Laurence Dworet
1996	Phone Calls from the Dead	Written By	TV Movie
1998	Armageddon	Story By	Co-Wrote Story with Jonathan Hensleigh
