= Outbreak (1995 film) =

1995 film directed by Wolfgang Petersen

- Theatrical release poster
- Directed by: Wolfgang Petersen
- Written by: Laurence Dworet; Robert Roy Pool
- Produced by: Gail Katz; Arnold Kopelson; Wolfgang Petersen
- Starring: Dustin Hoffman; Rene Russo; Morgan Freeman; Cuba Gooding Jr.; Patrick Dempsey; Donald Sutherland; Kevin Spacey
- Cinematography: Michael Ballhaus
- Edited by: William Hoy; Lynzee Klingman; Stephen E. Rivkin; Neil Travis
- Music by: James Newton Howard
- Production companies: Arnold Kopelson Productions; Punch Productions, inc.
- Distributed by: Warner Bros.
- Release date: March 10, 1995
- Running time: 128 minutes
- Country: United States
- Language: English
- Budget: >$50 million
- Box office: $189.8 million

Outbreak is a 1995 American medical disaster film directed by Wolfgang Petersen and written by Laurence Dworet and Robert Roy Pool. The film stars Dustin Hoffman, Rene Russo and Morgan Freeman, and co-stars Donald Sutherland, Cuba Gooding Jr., Kevin Spacey and Patrick Dempsey.

The film focuses on an outbreak of Motaba—a fictional virus similar to ebolavirus and orthomyxoviridae—in Zaire, and later in a small town in California. It is set primarily in the United States Army Medical Research Institute of Infectious Diseases and the Centers for Disease Control and Prevention, as well as the fictional town of Cedar Creek, California. Outbreak's plot follows the actions of military and civilian agencies to contain the spread of a deadly, contagious disease.

The film, released by Warner Bros. on March 10, 1995, was a box-office success, and Spacey won two awards for his performance. A real-life outbreak of the Ebola virus was occurring in Zaire when the film was released. The film's popularity resurged during the COVID-19 pandemic, ranking as the fourth most streamed film in the United States on Netflix on March 13, 2020.

== Plot ==
The single biggest threat to man's continued dominance on the planet is the virus.

— Joshua Lederberg, Ph.D., Nobel laureate, Film introduction: Outbreak (1995)

In 1967, during the Stanleyville mutinies, a virus called Motaba, which causes a deadly fever, is discovered in the African jungle. To keep the virus a secret, U.S. Army officers Donald McClintock and William Ford order the bombing of the camp where soldiers were infected, killing all occupants.

Twenty-eight years later, USAMRIID virologist Colonel Sam Daniels investigates an outbreak in Zaire which wiped out an entire village aside from two survivors (the shaman and a young boy). He and his crew – Lieutenant Colonel Casey Schuler and new USAMRIID officer Major Salt – gather information and return to the United States. Ford, now a brigadier general and Daniels's superior officer, dismisses Daniels's fears that the virus will spread.

A white-faced capuchin monkey that is host to the virus is smuggled into the country. James "Jimbo" Scott, a worker at a California animal testing laboratory, is infected when he steals the monkey. Scott tries to sell the monkey to Rudy Alvarez, a pet-store proprietor, but Alvarez refuses to buy it. The monkey scratches Alvarez and he later becomes infected. A hospital technician in Cedar Creek is also infected after accidentally breaking a vial of Alvarez's blood.

Scott releases the monkey into the woods outside Palisades. While flying to Boston, Scott develops symptoms and infects his girlfriend, Alice, at the airport. Their illness is investigated by Dr. Roberta Keough, a CDC scientist and Daniels's ex-wife. Scott, Alice, and Alvarez die, but Keough determines no one else in Boston was infected.

In Cedar Creek, the virus quickly mutates into an airborne, influenza-like strain after many are infected in a superspreading event at a local movie theater. Daniels flies to Cedar Creek against Ford's orders, joining Keough's team with Schuler and Salt. As they search for the monkey, the Army quarantines the town and imposes martial law. Schuler is infected when his suit tears, and Keough accidentally sticks herself with a contaminated needle.

When Ford provides an experimental serum that cures the original strain, Daniels realizes that his superiors knew about the virus before the outbreak. Daniels learns about Operation Clean Sweep, a military plan to contain the virus by bombing Cedar Creek, incinerating the entire town and its residents, ostensibly to prevent Motaba's expansion to pandemic proportions. However, McClintock, now a major general, wants to conceal the mutated virus's existence and preserve the original strain as a biological weapon.

To prevent Daniels from finding a cure, McClintock orders him arrested for carrying the virus. Daniels escapes, and he and Salt fly a helicopter to the ship at sea that carried the monkey. Daniels obtains a photo of the monkey and releases it to the media; a mother in Palisades contacts the CDC upon realizing her young daughter has been playing with the monkey (which she named Betsy). Daniels and Salt arrive and Salt tranquilizes Betsy. Ford delays the bombing after Daniels informs him Betsy was captured.

On their return flight, Daniels and Salt are pursued by McClintock in another helicopter. Salt fires two rockets into the trees, setting them afire to simulate a crash. Back in Cedar Creek, Salt mixes Betsy's antibodies with Ford's serum to create an antiserum; although it is not clear what happens to Schuler, they save Keough. McClintock returns to base and resumes Operation Clean Sweep, refusing to listen to Ford. Daniels and Salt fly their helicopter directly into the bomber's path to its target. With Ford's help, Daniels persuades the bomber's flight crew to detonate the thermobaric bomb over water and spare the town. Before McClintock can order another bombing, Ford relieves him of command and orders his arrest. Daniels and Keough reconcile as Cedar Creek's residents are cured.

== Cast ==
- Dustin Hoffman as Colonel Sam Daniels, MD
- Rene Russo as Roberta "Robby" Keough, MD
- Morgan Freeman as Brigadier General William "Billy" Ford, MD
- Donald Sutherland as Major General Donald "Donnie" McClintock
- Kevin Spacey as Lieutenant Colonel Casey Schuler, MD
- Cuba Gooding Jr. as Major Salt, MD
- Patrick Dempsey as James "Jimbo" Scott
- Zakes Mokae as Dr. Benjamin Iwabi
- Malick Bowens as Dr. Raswani
- Susan Lee Hoffman as Dr. Lisa Aronson
- Benito Martinez as Dr. Julio Ruiz
- Bruce Jarchow as Dr. Mascelli
- Leland Hayward III as Henry Seward
- Daniel Chodos as Rudy Alvarez
- Lance Kerwin as American Mercenary
- Dale Dye as Lieutenant Colonel Briggs
- Diana Bellamy as Mrs. Pananides
- J. T. Walsh as White House Chief of Staff (uncredited)
- David A. R. White as Army Pilot (uncredited)
- Jack Rader as Police Chief Fowler

== Production ==
Scenes in "Cedar Creek" were filmed in Ferndale, California, where tanks and helicopters were a common feature of daily life during nearly two months of filming. Other locations used were Dugway Proving Ground and Kauai.

Harrison Ford was offered the role of Sam Daniels, but turned it down. Sylvester Stallone and Mel Gibson were also offered the role, but also turned it down.

Producer Lynda Obst has stated it was due to the production of Outbreak that her film adaptation of The Hot Zone was dropped by 20th Century Fox, despite having, in her words, "the better package and ... the better script". She also claimed that director Wolfgang Petersen tried to entice Robert Redford, who was already cast for her film, to be a part of Outbreak, based on Redford's call to her. Obst would eventually have her adaptation of the book, but greenlit as a miniseries by National Geographic, which premiered in May 2019.

== Release ==
=== Box office ===
Outbreak was a commercial success. It topped the U.S. box-office list its opening weekend with a gross of $13.4 million, and spent three weeks at number one before Tommy Boy's release. It was number one in Japan for six weeks. The film grossed $67.7 million in the United States and Canada, and $122.2 million internationally, for a worldwide total of $189.9 million.

=== Critical reception ===
Outbreak received mixed reviews from critics. According to the review aggregator website Rotten Tomatoes, 59% of 64 critics gave the film a positive review, with an average rating of 5.7 out of 10. The website's consensus states: "A frustratingly uneven all-star disaster drama, Outbreak ultimately proves only mildly contagious and leaves few lasting side effects." On Metacritic, the film has a weighted average score of 64 out of 100, based on 21 critic reviews, indicating "generally favorable reviews". Audiences polled by CinemaScore gave the film an average grade of "A−" on a scale of A+ to F scale.

Roger Ebert of the Chicago Sun-Times gave it three and a half stars of four, calling Outbreak's premise "one of the great scare stories of our time, the notion that deep in the uncharted rain forests, deadly diseases are lurking, and if they ever escape their jungle homes and enter the human bloodstream, there will be a new plague the likes of which we have never seen."

Rita Kempley of The Washington Post also enjoyed the film's plot: "Outbreak is an absolute hoot thanks primarily to director Wolfgang Petersen's rabid pacing and the great care he brings to setting up the story and its probability."

David Denby wrote for New York magazine that although the opening scenes were well-done, "somewhere in the middle ... Outbreak falls off a cliff" and becomes "lamely conventional".

Janet Maslin of The New York Times found the film's subject compelling, but its treatment ineffective: "The film's shallowness also contributes to the impression that no problem is too thorny to be solved by movie heroics."

==== Scientific accuracy ====
The film's scientific liberties have been criticized, especially compared to the realism of the 2011 film Contagion. Implausibilities include the virus taking only an hour, rather than days, to multiply; the synthesis of the cure taking less than a minute, rather than many months; and the injection of the cure producing immediate improvement.

=== Accolades ===
Award	Date of ceremony	Category	Recipient(s)	Result	Ref.
ASCAP Film and Television Music Awards	April 22, 1996	Top Box Office Films	James Newton Howard (Note: Nominated for his work on Waterworld and Outbreak)	Won (Note: Tied with 10 other people)	
Critics' Choice Movie Awards	January 22, 1996	Best Supporting Actor	Kevin Spacey (Note: Nominated for his performance in The Usual Suspects, Seven, Swimming with Sharks, and Outbreak)	Won (Note: Tied with Ed Harris)	
Los Angeles Film Critics Association Awards	January 15, 1996	Best Supporting Actor	Kevin Spacey (Note: Nominated for his performance in Outbreak, Swimming with Sharks, Seven, and The Usual Suspects)	Runner-up	
NAACP Image Awards	April 6, 1996	Outstanding Supporting Actor in a Motion Picture	Cuba Gooding Jr.	Nominated	
New York Film Critics Circle Awards	January 7, 1996	Best Supporting Actor	Kevin Spacey	Won	
Saturn Awards	June 25, 1996	Best Science Fiction Film	Outbreak	Nominated	
Society of Texas Film Critics Awards	December 28, 1995	Best Supporting Actor	Kevin Spacey (Note: Nominated for his performance in The Usual Suspects, Seven, and Outbreak)	Won	

=== Later popularity ===
The film's popularity resurged during the COVID-19 pandemic, ranking as the fourth-most-streamed film on Netflix in the United States on March 13, 2020.
