= For Hope =

- Genre: Drama
- Written by: Susan Rice
- Directed by: Bob Saget
- Starring: Dana Delany; Chris Demetral; Henry Czerny; Polly Bergen; Sharon Monsky; Harold Gould
- Music by: Peter Rodgers Melnick
- Country of origin: United States
- Original language: English

Production
- Executive producers: Bernie Brillstein; Brad Grey; Bob Saget
- Producer: Karen Moore
- Production location: Vancouver
- Cinematography: Ron Orieux
- Editor: Michael S. Murphy
- Running time: 100 minutes
- Production companies: Brillstein-Grey Entertainment; Columbia Pictures Television

Original release
- Network: ABC
- Release: November 17, 1996

For Hope is a 1996 American drama television film starring Dana Delany and directed by Bob Saget. Written by Susan Rice and based on Saget's sister Gay, the film shows the experience of a young woman fatally afflicted with the disease scleroderma. Other cast members include Tracy Nelson and Chris Demetral. The film was produced by Brillstein-Grey Entertainment and Columbia Pictures Television and premiered on November 17, 1996 on ABC.

Dana Delany had to have some significant prosthetic makeup applied to simulate the various degrees of disfigurement the main character, Hope, experienced as a result of the disease.

The original airing achieved the top Nielsen ratings for the time slot. The film has periodically been rerun on various TV networks and is available on DVD and VHS for a $20 donation at the Scleroderma Research Foundation.

An extra feature of the film is that it includes a cameo appearance by Scleroderma Research Foundation founder Sharon Monsky.
