= Laurence Dworet =

Laurence Dworet, M.D. (usually just credited as Laurence Dworet) is an American screenwriter.

In 1990, he and his writing partner Robert Roy Pool sold their spec screenplay The Ultimatum for $500,000 against $1,000,000 if a film was made. It was the story of terrorists who plant an atomic bomb in an American city and threaten nuclear devastation unless their demands are met. Steven Spielberg described it as one of the three most exciting scripts he had ever read and was going to direct it, but the script became bogged-down in endless rewrites.

Using his medical background, Dworet and Pool wrote the screenplay for Outbreak which they sold to producer Arnold Kopelson for $250,000 as he wanted a rival virus picture to Fox's Crisis in the Hot Zone. Kopelson then paid Ted Tally $500,000 to rewrite the script.

An interview with Dworet can be found in William Froug's book The New Screenwriter Looks at the New Screenwriter.
