= Bob Saget =

American comedian and actor (1956–2022)

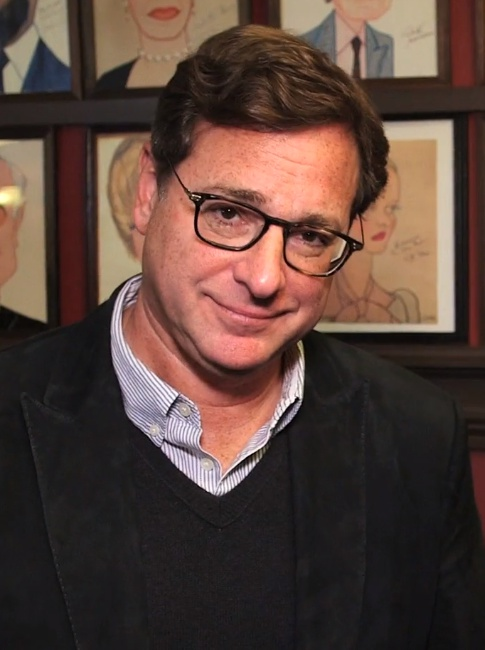
- Saget in 2015
- Born: Robert Lane Saget; May 17, 1956; Philadelphia, Pennsylvania, U.S.
- Died: January 9, 2022 (aged 65); Orange County, Florida, U.S.
- Burial place: Mount Sinai Memorial Park Cemetery
- Education: Temple University (BA)
- Spouses: Sherri Kramer (m. 1982; div. 1997); Kelly Rizzo (m. 2018)
- Children: 3
- Occupations: Stand-up comedian; actor; director; television host

Comedy career
- Years active: 1977–2022
- Medium: Stand-up; television; film
- Genres: Blue comedy; clean comedy; observational comedy; sexual comedy; musical comedy; satire; wit; wordplay
- Website: bobsaget.com

Robert Lane Saget (May 17, 1956 – January 9, 2022) was an American stand-up comedian, actor, director, and television host. He portrayed Danny Tanner on the sitcom Full House (1987–1995) and its sequel Fuller House (2016–2020). Saget was the original host of America's Funniest Home Videos (1989–1997), and the voice of narrator Ted Mosby on the sitcom How I Met Your Mother (2005–2014). He was simultaneously known for his family-friendly image and his profane comedian persona, with his 2014 album That's What I'm Talkin' About being nominated for the Grammy Award for Best Comedy Album.

== Early life ==
Robert Lane Saget was born into a Jewish family in Philadelphia, Pennsylvania, on May 17, 1956, the son of hospital administrator Rosalyn and supermarket chain executive Benjamin Saget. Benjamin had lost four siblings and four of Bob's own siblings died prematurely as well. Early in his life, his family moved to Norfolk, Virginia, where he briefly attended Lake Taylor High School. He later said that his sense of humor developed while he was a rebellious student at the Conservative synagogue Temple Israel in Norfolk. Due to a lack of family in Norfolk, he returned to Philadelphia for his bar mitzvah. The family later moved from Norfolk to the Encino neighborhood of Los Angeles, California, where Saget met Larry Fine of The Three Stooges and listened to him tell stories. The family then moved back to the Philadelphia area prior to his senior year, and he graduated from Abington Senior High School. Saget originally intended to become a doctor, but his Honors English teacher saw his creative potential and urged him to pursue an acting career.

Saget attended Temple University's film school, where he created Through Adam's Eyes, a black-and-white film about a boy who received reconstructive facial surgery; he received an award of merit in the Student Academy Awards. While attending university, he took the train to New York City and performed at comedy clubs such as The Improv and Catch a Rising Star; his act included a section where he played the Beatles song "While My Guitar Gently Weeps", using a water bottle to make his guitar appear to actually weep. He graduated from Temple with a BA in 1978. He intended to take graduate courses at the University of Southern California, but quit after only a few days. He later described himself at that time as a "cocky, overweight 22-year-old" who "had a gangrenous appendix taken out, almost died, [and] got over being cocky or overweight". He further discussed his burst appendix on Anytime with Bob Kushell, revealing that it happened on the Fourth of July at the UCLA Medical Center, and that surgeons put ice on the area for seven hours before taking his appendix out and finding that it had become gangrenous.

== Career ==
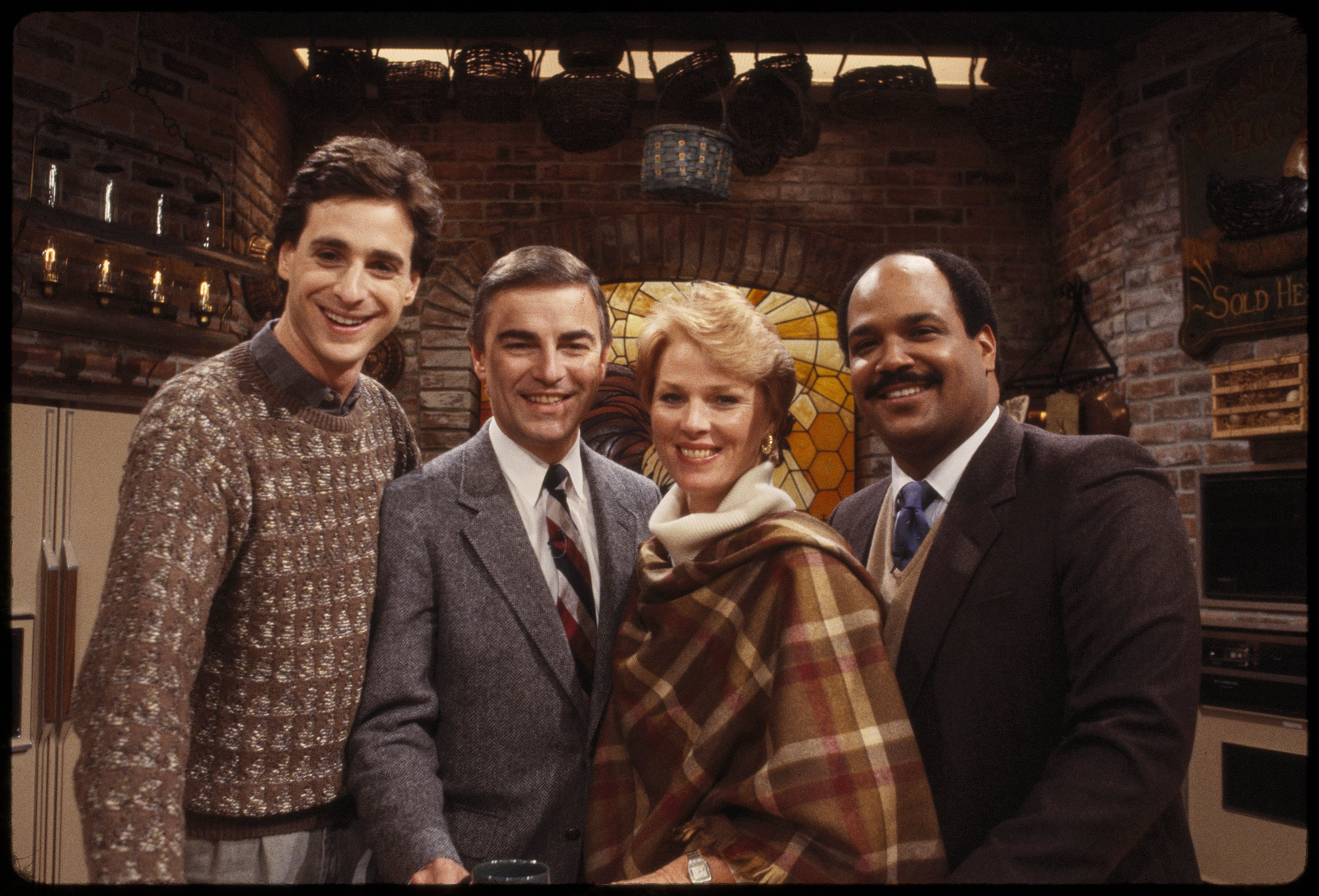
Saget with Rolland Smith, Mariette Hartley, and Mark McEwen in 1987

Following a short stint as a member of CBS' The Morning Program in early 1987, Saget was cast as Danny Tanner in Full House, which became a success with family viewers, and landed in the Nielsen ratings' Top 30 beginning with season three. In 1989, Saget began as the host of America's Funniest Home Videos, a role he held until 1997. During the early 1990s, Saget worked on both Full House and AFV simultaneously. In 2009, he returned to AFV for the 20th-anniversary one-hour special co-hosted with Tom Bergeron.

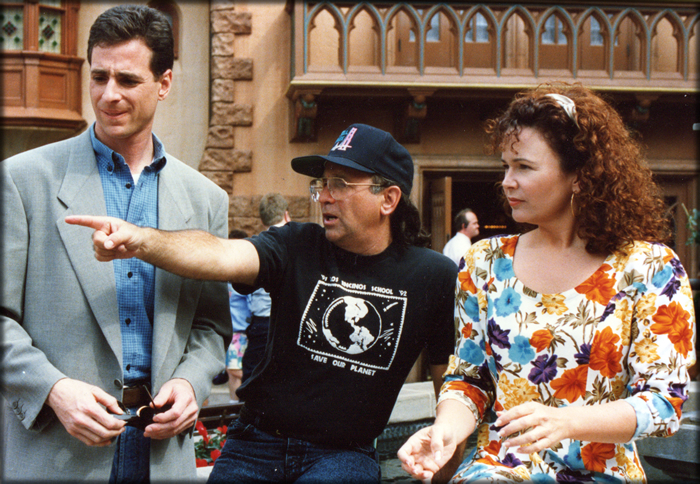
Saget acting as Danny Tanner on Full House

Saget directed the 1996 ABC television film For Hope, which was inspired by the life story of his sister, Gay Saget, who had died from scleroderma three years earlier. In 1998, he directed his first feature film, Dirty Work, starring Norm Macdonald and Artie Lange. Released one year after he left his role as host of America's Funniest Home Videos, the film received broadly negative reviews from critics and earned low box office returns. However, it has since become a cult favorite, due partially to Artie Lange's later popularity on The Howard Stern Show where the film is sometimes mentioned, often in unflattering terms. In 1998, Saget made a cameo appearance as a cocaine addict in the stoner comedy Half Baked.

In 2001, Saget took on another widowed-dad role, starring on Raising Dad on The WB. It co-starred Kat Dennings, Brie Larson, and Jerry Adler and lasted only one season, from October 5, 2001, to May 10, 2002. He served as the voice of the future Ted Mosby, who narrated the CBS sitcom How I Met Your Mother, which ran for nine seasons from September 19, 2005, to March 31, 2014. He was host of the NBC game show 1 vs. 100 from 2006 to 2008. His HBO comedy special, That Ain't Right, came out on DVD on August 28, 2007. It is dedicated to his father, Ben Saget, who died at age 89 on January 30, 2007, due to complications from congestive heart failure. From 2005 to 2010, Saget had a recurring role in four episodes of the HBO TV series Entourage playing a parody version of himself. He later appeared in the 2015 feature film based on the series. 2005 also saw him partake in "Rollin' with Saget", a song by Jamie Kennedy and Stuart Stone, about a night out with him that shows off his raunchier behaviors. The video appeared on the MTV series Blowin' Up, and he came to use it as a pseudo-theme song on his stand-up tours and website.

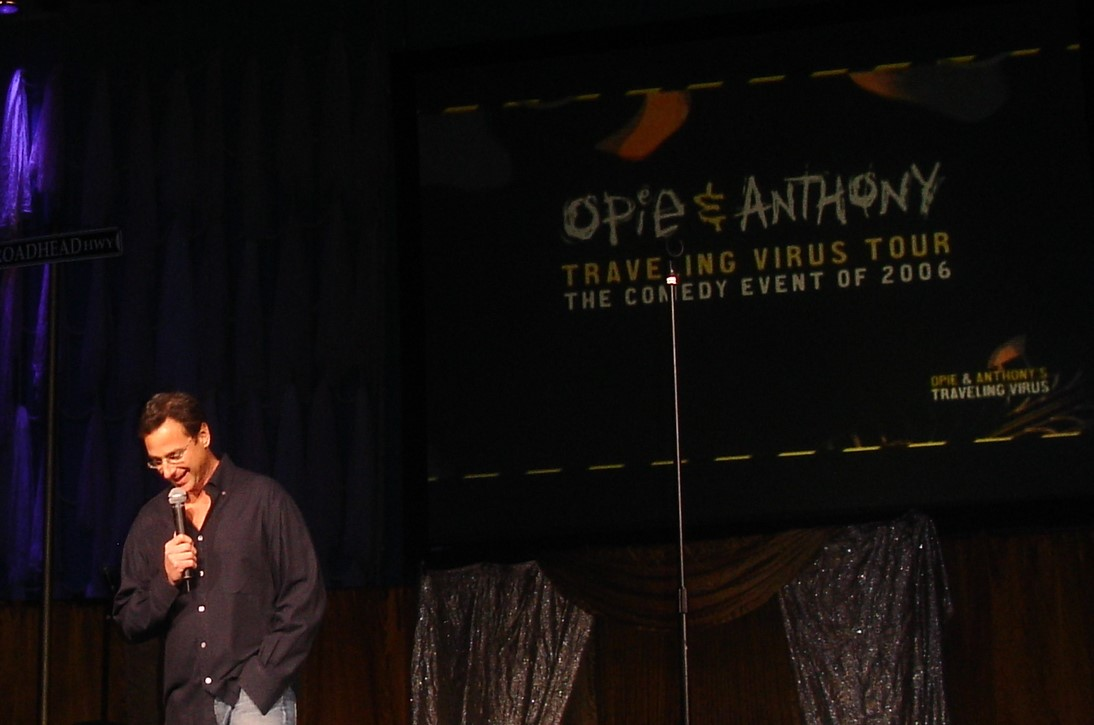
Saget during the 2006 Opie and Anthony's Traveling Virus Comedy Tour

Saget wrote, directed, and starred in Farce of the Penguins, a parody of 2005's March of the Penguins, which was released direct-to-DVD, in January 2007. Saget appeared in the Broadway musical The Drowsy Chaperone for a limited four-month engagement. He played "Man in Chair" while Jonathan Crombie, who normally played the character on Broadway, was with the national tour of the musical. On January 4, 2008, Saget's caricature was unveiled at Sardi's Restaurant. In April 2009, he debuted in a new sitcom along with his co-star Cynthia Stevenson on ABC called Surviving Suburbia. The series, which was originally slated to air on The CW, ended after a single abbreviated season. In 2010, Saget starred in the A&E series Strange Days, in which he followed others in different activities and lifestyles, documenting their adventures in unusual ways.

In 2014, his book Dirty Daddy was released, in which he writes about his career, comedy influences, and experiences with life and death. He embarked on a small tour in support of the book, including the Pemberton Music Festival, where he introduced Snoop Dogg prior to performing his own set. In the same year, he toured Australia for the first time with a stand-up show called Bob Saget Live: The Dirty Daddy Tour. The show was performed in the major cities of Melbourne, Sydney, Brisbane, and Perth.

In 2015 and 2016, he guest-starred in two episodes of Grandfathered, starring and produced by his Full House co-star John Stamos. From 2016 to 2020, Saget reprised his role as Danny Tanner for fifteen episodes of Full House's sequel series, Fuller House, including the series premiere and finale.

In 2017, he released another stand-up special, Bob Saget: Zero to Sixty.

In 2018, Saget began directing a documentary about one of his favorite comedians, Martin Mull. Both Saget and Mull died before the documentary, Who is Martin Mull?, was released on Netflix in 2026.

In 2019, he was announced as host of ABC's Videos After Dark. Saget also hosted the game show Nashville Squares on CMT, and made his first of three appearances as a panelist on To Tell the Truth.

In 2020, Saget competed in season four of The Masked Singer as "Squiggly Monster". Saget also launched a podcast titled Bob Saget's Here for You with Studio71. Its 130th and final episode, with comedian Dane Cook, was released posthumously on January 31, 2022.

He also made an appearance on Nikki Glaser's E! series Welcome Home Nikki Glaser? in an episode that aired on June 5, 2022.

In 2026, clips of Saget were featured in a documentary on Netflix by Judd Apatow about comedian Norm Macdonald. Macdonald was among the comedians who performed at the 2008 Comedy Central Roast of Bob Saget.

== Personal life ==
Saget married Sherri Kramer in 1982, and they had three daughters before divorcing in 1997. He was later married to television presenter Kelly Rizzo from 2018 until his death in 2022.

Saget was a board member of the Scleroderma Research Foundation. His efforts benefited celebrities such as actress Regina Hall. In an interview with Ability, he discussed how his sister was diagnosed with scleroderma at 43 and died at 47. She had previously been misdiagnosed numerous times. Another sister died of a brain aneurysm at the age of 32.

== Death ==
At about 4 p.m. EST on January 9, 2022, Saget was found dead in his room at a Ritz-Carlton hotel near Williamsburg in Orange County, Florida. At the time of his death, Saget was on a stand-up tour and had performed in Ponte Vedra Beach the previous evening. An autopsy report released on February 9 found that Saget had blunt head trauma from an accidental blow to the back of his head, most likely from a fall, and had subsequently died from the resulting injuries (subdural hematoma and subarachnoid hemorrhage) in his sleep. He was infected with COVID-19 at the time, though there were no signs that it played a role in his death. His funeral took place on January 14, and he was buried at Mount Sinai Memorial Park near the graves of his parents and sister. On February 15, Saget's family sued to prevent county officials from releasing additional documents from the investigation of his death, arguing that their graphic content would present privacy violations. On March 14, a permanent injunction was issued against releasing the documents.

=== Tributes ===
News of Saget's death broke during a broadcast of America's Funniest Home Videos, of which he was the original host, and ABC interrupted the program to announce it. A tribute video was posted on the show's official YouTube channel, and a dedication to Saget was added before the credits of the following episode. Clips of Saget's hosting of the show were run from January 16 to the end of 2021–22 season on America's Funniest Home Videos as tribute as well.

Saget had been honored with donations and offers to help the charity Scleroderma Research Foundation (SRF), whose board of directors Saget served on since 2003. According to a statement made by the foundation's executive director on January 13, 2022, the foundation received donations from more than 1,500 donors from all over the world, totaling more than $90,000. Additionally, a donation of $1.5 million was awarded to the charity by one of its board members in the form of a grant, which will match every donation made in memory of Saget.

A tribute special was filmed at The Comedy Store by Saget's longtime friend Mike Binder on January 30; titled Dirty Daddy: The Bob Saget Tribute and featuring footage from a private memorial held at Jeff Franklin's home, it was released on Netflix on June 10, 2022.

== Filmography ==
=== Comedy specials ===
Year	Title	Notes
1990	Bob Saget: In the Dream State Comedy Special	Himself
2007	That Ain't Right	Writer
2013	That's What I'm Talkin' About	Writer and producer; Nominated – Grammy Award for Best Comedy Album
2017	Zero to Sixty	Writer

=== Film ===
Year	Title	Role	Notes
1977	Through Adam's Eyes		Documentary short, writer/director Student Academy Award – Documentary Merit (Temple University)
1978	A Filmmaker's Film	Himself	Short, writer/director/producer/editor (Temple University)
1979	Spaced Out	Wurlitzer	Uncredited voice role in US version
1980	Devices	Therapy Patient	
1981	Full Moon High	Sportscaster	
1987	Critical Condition	Dr. Joffe	
1993	For Goodness Sake	Surgeon	
1997	Meet Wally Sparks	Reporter #4	
1998	Half Baked	Cocaine addict	Uncredited
1998	Dirty Work		Director
2003	Dumb and Dumberer: When Harry Met Lloyd	Walter Matthews	
2004	New York Minute	Himself	Cameo (no lines)
2005	The Aristocrats	Himself	Documentary
2005	Madagascar	Zoo Animal (voice)	
2007	Farce of the Penguins	Carl (voice)	Direct-to-video; also writer, director, and producer
2015	I Am Chris Farley	Himself	Documentary
2016	A Stand Up Guy	Mel	
2017	Gilbert	Himself	Documentary
2018	Benjamin	Ed	Also director and executive producer
2022	Daniel's Gotta Die	Lawrence	Posthumous release
2026	Who Is Martin Mull?	Himself	Also co-director; posthumous release

=== Television ===
Year	Title	Role	Notes
1981	Bosom Buddies	Bob the Comic	Episode: "The Show Must Go On"
1983	The Greatest American Hero	Rook	Episode: "Wizards and Warlocks"
1985	New Love, American Style	Various	4 episodes
1986	It's a Living	Dr. Bartlett	Episode: "The Doctor Danny Show"
1987–1995	Full House	Danny Tanner	Main role; 192 episodes
1989–1997	America's Funniest Home Videos	Himself/host	191 episodes, guest-hosted 2 episode in 2009 and in 2019; cameo in 2015
1989	The All-New Mickey Mouse Club	Danny Tanner	Episode: "Guest Day"
1992	Quantum Leap	Macklyn "Mack" MacKay	Episode: "Stand Up – April 30, 1959"
1992	To Grandmother's House We Go	Win-O-Lotto Lottery Host	Movie; uncredited
1994	Father and Scout	Spencer Paley	Movie; also executive producer
1995	Saturday Night Live	Himself (host)	Episode: "Bob Saget/TLC"
1996	For Hope		Movie; director and executive producer
1997	Jitters		Movie; director
2000	Becoming Dick	Bob	Movie (uncredited); also director
2000	The Norm Show	Mr. Atkitson	Episode: "Norm vs. Schoolin'"; also director
2001–2002	Raising Dad	Matt Stewart	22 episodes
2004	Joey	Himself	Episode: "Joey and the Road Trip"
2004	Huff	Butch	Episode: "Flashpants"
2005	Listen Up	Mitch	Episode: "Coach Potato"
2005–2010	Entourage	Himself	4 Episodes
2005–2014	How I Met Your Mother	Ted Mosby (in 2030)	208 episodes; Voice-over narration
2006–2008	1 vs. 100	Himself/host	Game show (28 episodes)
2006	Casper's Scare School	Dash (voice)	Movie; voice role
2006	Law & Order: Special Victims Unit	Glenn Cheales	Episode: "Choreographed"
2008	The Life & Times of Tim	Party Marty	Episode: "Mugger/Cin City"; voice role
2008	The Comedy Central Roast of Bob Saget	Himself	Special
2009	Surviving Suburbia	Steve Patterson	13 episodes
2010	Strange Days with Bob Saget	Himself/host	6 episodes
2011	Law & Order: LA	Adam Brennan	Episode: "Van Nuys"
2011	Louie	Himself	Episode: "Oh Louie/Tickets"
2014	Super Fun Night	Mr. Porter Warner	Episode: "Cookie Prom"
2014	Legit	Himself	Episode: "Licked"
2015, 2016	Grandfathered	Himself/ Ronnie	Episode: "Pilot"/ Episode: "The Sat Pack"
2016	Robot Chicken	Mike O'Malley, Galactus, Cable Guy (voices)	Episode: "The Unnamed One"
2016–2020	Fuller House	Danny Tanner	Recurring role; 15 episodes
2017	Michael Bolton's Big, Sexy Valentine's Day Special	Himself	Variety special
2017	Nightcap	Himself	Episode: "Bringing Up Baby"
2018	The Good Cop	Richie Knight	Episode: "Did the TV Star Do It?"
2018	Shameless	Father D'Amico	Episode: "Face It, You're Gorgeous"
2018	Bumping Mics with Jeff Ross & Dave Attell	Himself	1 episode
2019	Videos After Dark	Himself/host	2 episodes
2019	Historical Roasts	Abraham Lincoln	Episode: "Abraham Lincoln"
2019	Nashville Squares	Himself/host	10 episodes
2019–2021	To Tell the Truth	Himself	3 episodes
2020	The Masked Singer	Squiggly Monster	Eliminated after second appearance
2021	Nickelodeon's Unfiltered	Himself	Episode: "Dreaming of an Awful Waffle!"
2022	Phat Tuesdays: The Era Of Hip Hop Comedy	Himself	Documentary series; posthumous release
2022	Welcome Home Nikki Glaser?	Himself	Episode: "Love Shack Baby?"; posthumous release

== Written work ==
Saget, Bob. Dirty Daddy: The Chronicles of a Family Man Turned Filthy Comedian. 2014: It Books. ISBN 978-0-062-27478-6.
