= Snow White (Barthelme novel) =

1967 novel by Donald Barthelme

- First edition
- Author: Donald Barthelme
- Cover artist: Lawrence Ratzkin
- Language: English
- Genre: Fantasy fiction Postmodernism
- Publisher: Atheneum Books
- Publication date: 1967
- Media type: Print
- Pages: 181
- ISBN: 978-0-684-82479-6

Snow White is a post-modernist novel by author Donald Barthelme published in 1967 by Atheneum Books. The book inverts the fairy tale of the same name by highlighting the form by discussing the different expectations and compromises the characters make to survive in their world. This is done through Barthelme's fragmentary rhetoric and discourse, by shifting perspectives from the seven "dwarves" or Snow White herself, as well as the wicked step-mother, "Jane". It was Barthelme's first novel, published seven years after he started having his short stories published in literary magazines and publications such as The New Yorker.
