= Scleroderma Research Foundation =

Non-profit organization based in San Francisco

The Scleroderma Research Foundation (SRF) is a non-profit organization based in San Francisco that funds research into scleroderma. The SRF also funds and supports Scleroderma Centers of Excellence, including the Johns Hopkins Hospital's Scleroderma Center in Baltimore.

Over 30 years, the SRF has raised millions of dollars for scleroderma research. The organization funds research based on review and recommendations by its Scientific Advisory Board.

The SRF website provides information on treatments, research, and their signature fundraising event.
