= List of Scripps College people =

Notable alumnae and staff of Scripps College

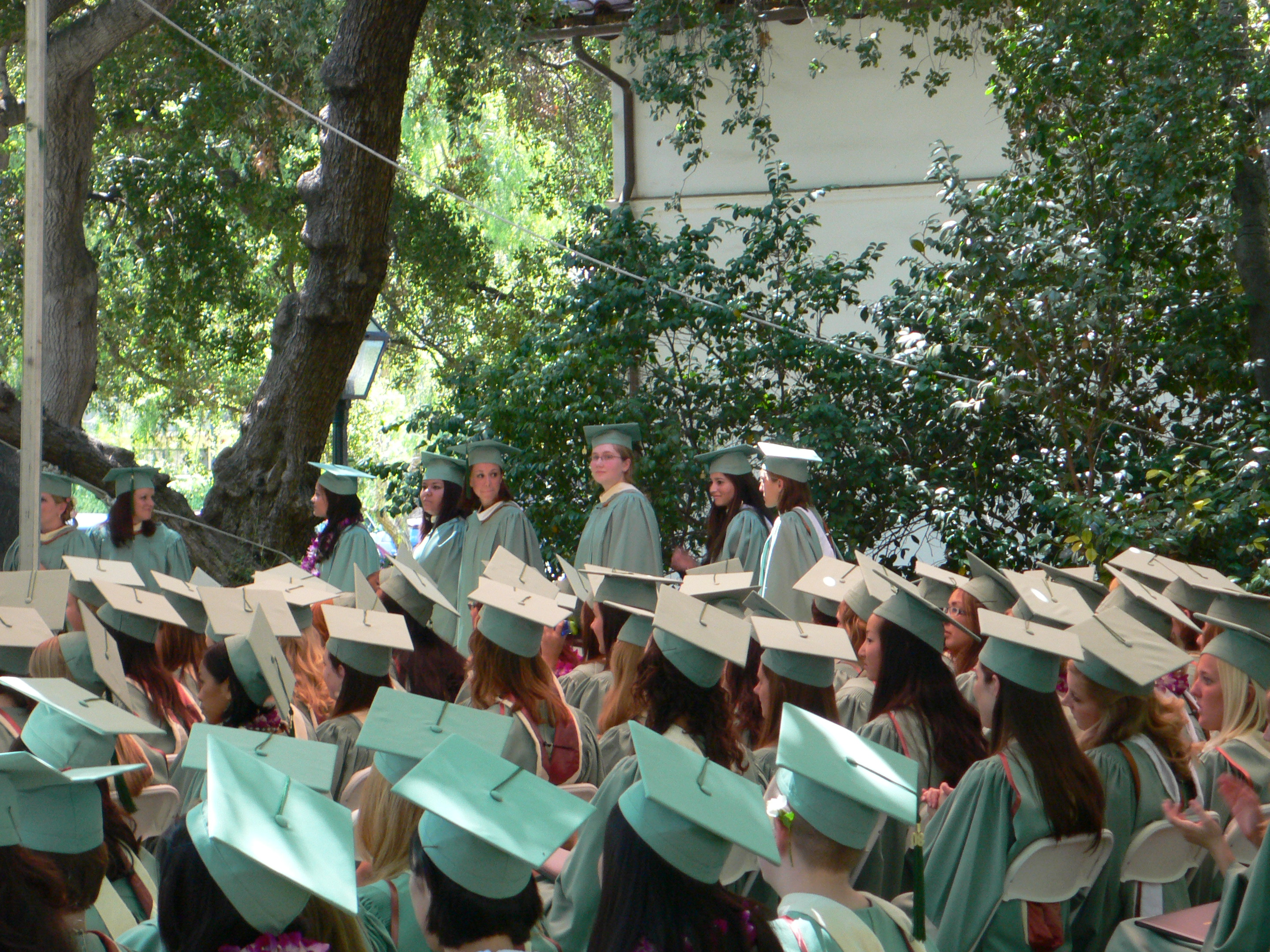
Graduation ceremony at Scripps College

Scripps College is a private liberal arts women's college in Claremont, California. It was founded in 1926 as a member of the Claremont Colleges, and is widely regarded as the most prestigious women's college in the Western United States. Many notable individuals have been affiliated with the college as graduates, non-graduating attendees, faculty, staff, or administrators.

Scripps has graduated 95 classes of students. As of the spring 2019 semester, the college enrolled approximately 1,110 students.

As of the spring 2026 semester, Scripps employs faculty members. The college has had nine official presidents and several interim presidents, including the current interim president, Amy Marcus-Newhall.

== Notable alumnae ==
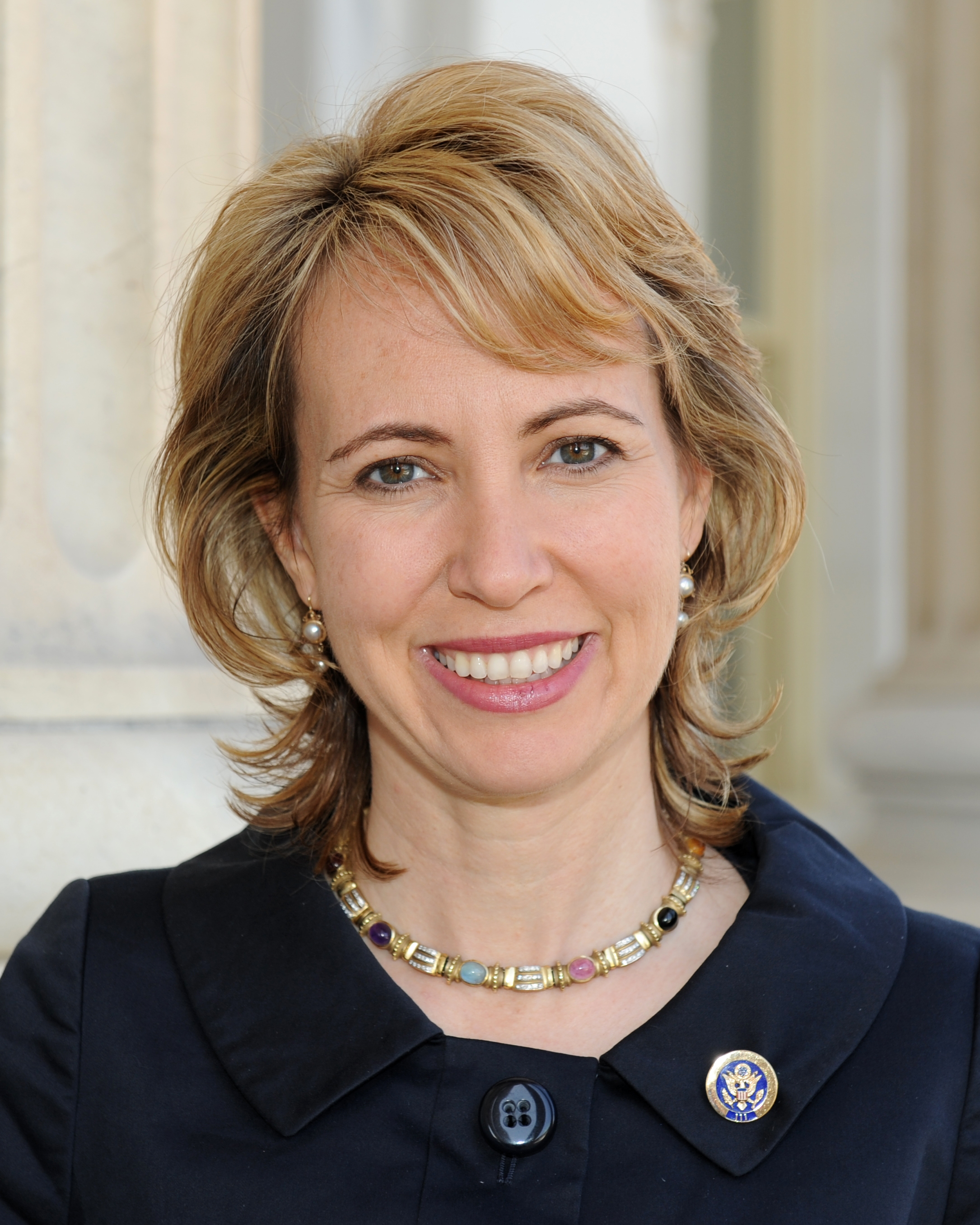
Former U.S. representative Gabby Giffords (D‑AZ 8th), class of 1993

Name	Class year	Notability	Ref.
Anne Hopkins Aitken	1932	Zen Buddhist in the Harada-Yasutani lineage	
Helene Mayer	Exchange student 1932–1934	Olympic gold medalist fencer who competed for Nazi Germany despite being Jewish	
Nancy Neighbor Russell	1953	Founder, Friends of the Columbia Gorge	
Molly Ivins	Attended 1962–1963	Newspaper columnist	
Beth Nolan	1973	White House Counsel for Bill Clinton	
Harriet Doerr	Attended 1975–1976	Novelist	
Alison Saar	1978	Sculptor and installation artist known for work on black identity	
Elizabeth Turk	1983	Sculpture artist	
Merodie A. Hancock	1987	Academic and president of Thomas Edison State University	
Gabby Giffords	1993	Democratic U.S. representative for Arizona's 8th district, gun control advocate	
Lily Foss	2013	New Hampshire State Representative for Hillsborough District 41	

== Notable faculty ==
Name	Active tenure	Notability	Ref.
Hartley Burr Alexander	1927–1939	Philosopher, writer, educator, scholar, poet, and iconographer	
Millard Sheets	1932–1955	Artist and designer	
Albert Stewart	1939–1965	Sculptor	
Lee Pattison	1941–1962	Concert pianist, composer, arranger, opera director	
Gail Kubik	1970–1980	composer, violinist	
Samella Lewis	1970–1984	Visual artist and art historian, printmaker and painter called the "godmother of African American art"	
Howard Smith (designer)	1976–1984	Artist and designer	
Michael S. Roth	1983–2000	Historian, university administrator, Hartley Burr Alexander Chair, President of Wesleyan University	
Hao Huang (pianist)	1994–present	Concert pianist, composer, playwright, Fulbright Scholar to Hungary, Bessie Bartlett Frankel Chair	
Ken Gonzales-Day	1995–present	Conceptual artist and historian, a fellow of the John Simon Guggenheim Memorial Foundation, Fletcher Jones Chair	
David Lloyd (academic)	1996-2004	Poet and professor of English and Humanities	
Juliet Koss	2000–present	Art historian	
Myriam J. A. Chancy	2008–present	Haitian-Canadian-American writer, fellow of the John Simon Guggenheim Memorial Foundation, Hartley Burr Alexander Chair	
Martha Gonzalez (musician)	2012–present	Chicana artivista (artist/activist) musician, feminist music theorist	
Vanessa C. Tyson	2015–present	Political scientist and politician	

== Presidents of Scripps College ==
The following persons served as president of Scripps College:

#	Image	Name	Term start	Term end	Ref.
1		Ernest Jaqua	1926	1942	
interim		Mary Kimberly Shirk	1942	1944	
2		Frederick Hard	1944	1964	
3		Mark Curtis	July 1, 1964	June 30, 1976	
4		John H. Chandler	July 1, 1976	June 30, 1989	
5		E. Howard Brooks	July 1, 1989	June 30, 1990	
6		Nancy Y. Bekavac	July 1, 1990	June 30, 2007	
interim		Frederick Weis (Note: Weis served as an interim president, but was elected full president before he stepped down, so he is counted in the college's official count.)	July 1, 2007	April 24, 2009	
7		Frederick Weis	April 24, 2009	June 30, 2009	
8		Lori Bettison-Varga	July 1, 2009	October 1, 2015	
interim		Amy Marcus-Newhall	October 2, 2015	July 31, 2016	
9		Lara Tiedens	August 1, 2016	April 14, 2021	
interim		Amy Marcus-Newhall	April 15, 2021	June 30, 2022	
10		Susan Keen	July 1, 2022	March 20, 2023	
interim		Amy Marcus-Newhall	March 20, 2023	April 6, 2023	
11		Amy Marcus-Newhall	April 6, 2023	Present	

Key
–	Denotes interim president

== See also ==
- List of Claremont Colleges people
