= Society of Les Voyageurs =

Student organization at the University of Michigan

- Formation: 1907; 119 years ago
- Type: University Student Group
- Headquarters: Habe Mills Pine Lodge, University of Michigan, Ann Arbor, Michigan
- Principal Officer: James McNair
- Affiliations: University of Michigan
- Website: https://maizepages.umich.edu/organization/societyoflesvoyageurs

The Society of Les Voyageurs is a student organization at the University of Michigan. It is one of the oldest university outing clubs in the United States. Founded in 1907, the Society of Les Voyageurs is the second oldest student organization on the University of Michigan campus. On Sunday evenings during the academic year, the Society hosts communal dinners known as "Sunday Feeds" along with educational programs and entertainment related to the outdoors.

== History ==
The Society of Les Voyageurs was founded in 1907 by University of Michigan students Elmer "Lindy" Lehndorff, Lawrence "Larry" Lark, and Chester MacChesney. They named the Society after the pioneering French-Canadian voyageurs of the Great Lakes fur trade, whom they admired as early adventurers and outdoorsmen. Society membership was initially open only to male students at the university. The Society's Constitution was amended in 1972 to allow for the admission of women, and the Society has been co-ed since that time. The Society has published an annual yearbook since 1910 as well as several volumes of Society history.

After nearly two decades of renting space on the University of Michigan campus, the Society drew up plans in 1924 to construct a cabin on several acres of property along the Huron River in Ann Arbor. "Pine Lodge", as it was originally named, was built almost entirely by Society members in the spring and summer of 1925, and has continually served since then as the home for the Society as well as a residence for student members. During the summer of 2012, the renamed Habe Mills Pine Lodge underwent an extensive renovation, including the installation of "Kay's Kitchen." The new kitchen is named for Kay Lane, a university student in the late 1960s and early 1970s upon whom Society members bestowed the title "Queen of the Cabin," and who ultimately paved the way for the admission of women as full members of the Society. After graduating from the University of Michigan, Kay remained active in the Society and was a well known friend and mentor to several generations of members.

=== 2012 Cabin renovation ===
Beginning in the summer of 2012, the cabin underwent a major renovation costing over $100,000. Plans for the renovation had been tossed around for years, and the final plans were made official in early January of that year. Most of the work was contracted out to by the River Carpentry, but many of the actives and alumni were around and gave a helping hand. The renovation consisted of expanding the dining room, adding an upstairs bathroom, re-doing the kitchen, adding in a hallway between the dining room and kitchen and expanding the upstairs lodge. The work was completed in August 2012, and was ready to welcome back students for the 2012 Fall semester. Potlucks continue as normal, but now there is more space to accommodate even more guests.

== Members ==
- Laurence McKinley Gould: noted American geologist, educator, polar explorer, and president of Carleton College
- Harold C. "Bud" Jordahl: noted environmental leader and Earth Day pioneer
- Milan C. Miskovsky: CIA lawyer who negotiated the release of downed U2 pilot Francis Gary Powers and the failed Bay of Pigs Invasion prisoners in 1962
- Grant W. Sharpe: pioneer of environmental interpretation and author of Interpreting the Environment
- John F. Turner: former director of the United States Fish and Wildlife Service, president of The Conservation Fund, and Assistant Secretary of State for Oceans and International Environmental and Scientific Affairs
- Red Berenson: former professional ice hockey player and coach of the University of Michigan men's ice hockey team
- Chad P. Dawson: Managing editor of the International Journal of Wilderness and co-author of the "Wilderness Management" 4th edition (2009, Golden, Co., Fulcrum Publishing)
- Steven E. Smitka: Olympic-level canoeist, philanthropist, and notable award winner. Managing editor of "Catch a Boat," a monthly self-help monograph (2021. Fitzroy + Co Publishing)
- Dr. Carroll B. Williams: pioneer scientist in entomology with the United States Forest Service, first African American student to graduate from University of Michigan School for Environment and Sustainability
