= Jaqua =

Jaqua is a surname. Notable people with the surname include:

- Ernest Jaqua (1882–1972), American academic
- Jon Jaqua (born 1948), American football player
- Nate Jaqua (born 1981), American soccer player, son of Jon

== See also ==
- Jaqua, California, alternate name of Iaqua, California
- Jaqua Township, Cheyenne County, Kansas
