= Frederick Hard =

American Shakespearean scholar

Frederick Hard (1898 – 1981) was an American Shakespearean scholar and academic administrator. He was the second and longest-serving president of Scripps College, a women's college in Claremont, California, from 1944 to 1964.
