= Lists of Claremont Colleges people =

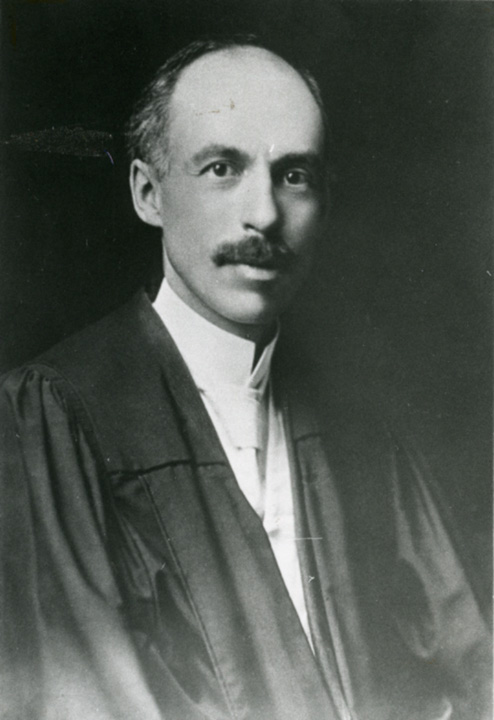
James Blaisdell, founder of the Claremont Colleges

These lists of Claremont Colleges people include notable graduates, non-graduating attendees, and past and present faculty, staff, and administrators of the Claremont Colleges (7Cs), a consortium of seven highly selective private institutions of higher education located in Claremont, California, United States. They are divided into articles by college:

- List of Pomona College people
- List of Claremont Graduate University people
- List of Scripps College people
- List of Claremont McKenna College people
- List of Harvey Mudd College people
- List of Pitzer College people
- List of Keck Graduate Institute people

== See also ==
- Claremont, California § Notable people
