= Scripps College =

Women's college in Claremont, California

- Motto: Incipit Vita Nova (Latin)
- Motto in English: "Here begins new life"
- Type: Private liberal arts women's college
- Established: 1926; 100 years ago
- Academic affiliations: Claremont Colleges; NAICU; CLAC; Annapolis Group
- Endowment: $503 million (2024)
- President: Amy Marcus-Newhall
- Faculty: 138 (100 full-time) (2023)
- Students: 1,103 (2023)
- Undergraduates: 1,082 (2023)
- Postgraduates: 21 (2023)
- Location: Claremont, California, U.S. 34°6′13″N 117°42′38″W
- Campus: Suburban, 32 acres (12.9 ha)
- Colors: Green and white
- Nickname: Stags (men) / Athenas (women)
- Sporting affiliations: NCAA Division III – SCIAC
- Mascot: La Semeuse ("she who sows")
- Website: www.scrippscollege.edu

Scripps College is a private liberal arts women's college in Claremont, California. It was founded as a member of the Claremont Colleges in 1926, a year after the consortium's formation. Journalist and philanthropist Ellen Browning Scripps provided its initial endowment.

Scripps is a four-year undergraduate institution and enrolled 958 students as of 2020. It offers instruction in the liberal arts with an emphasis on the humanities, and is known for its extensive interdisciplinary core curriculum. Its 32-acre (13 ha) campus was designed by Gordon Kaufmann in the Spanish Colonial Revival style and is listed on the National Register of Historic Places.

Scripps is regarded as the premier women's college in the West Coast of the United States. It is a top producer of Fulbright scholars. Its athletes compete on the Claremont-Mudd-Scripps Stags and Athenas joint team in the SCIAC, a Division III conference.

== History ==
=== Founding era ===
In November 1908, Ellen Browning Scripps, a philanthropist and prominent figure in the worlds of education, publishing, and women's rights based in La Jolla, Calif., first visited Pomona College in Claremont for its Dedication Day. She met many notable members of the young college, including James A. Blaisdell, its new president. Scripps continued to stay involved with Pomona College's community and kept in touch with Blaisdell in the years following the event, funding some of the college's lecture series.

Following an increase in enrollment of female students at Pomona College in 1919, Blaisdell turned to Scripps for the possibility of funding a "Woman's Campus." Scripps was willing to invest money into creating a college campus that would preserve her values of education. Over the next several years, she bought surrounding lots of land in Claremont and funded the construction of a new set of dormitories in what became "Scripps College for Women." According to Scripps, "The paramount obligation of a college is to develop in its students the ability to think clearly and independently, and the ability to live confidently, courageously, and hopefully." To provide a liberal arts experience with both an all-women's education and co-education, she wanted the college "to stress the essentials, reduce the size of the curriculum instead of increasing it."

Scripps initially did not want the college to be named after her, but Blaisdell convinced her that her name would help grow and publicize the college.

The development of Scripps College marked the start of Claremont's "group-college" system, similar to that of the Oxford Colleges, for which Scripps received much publicity. Scripps was featured on the cover of Time magazine for establishing this new consortium of colleges, which became known as the Claremont Colleges.

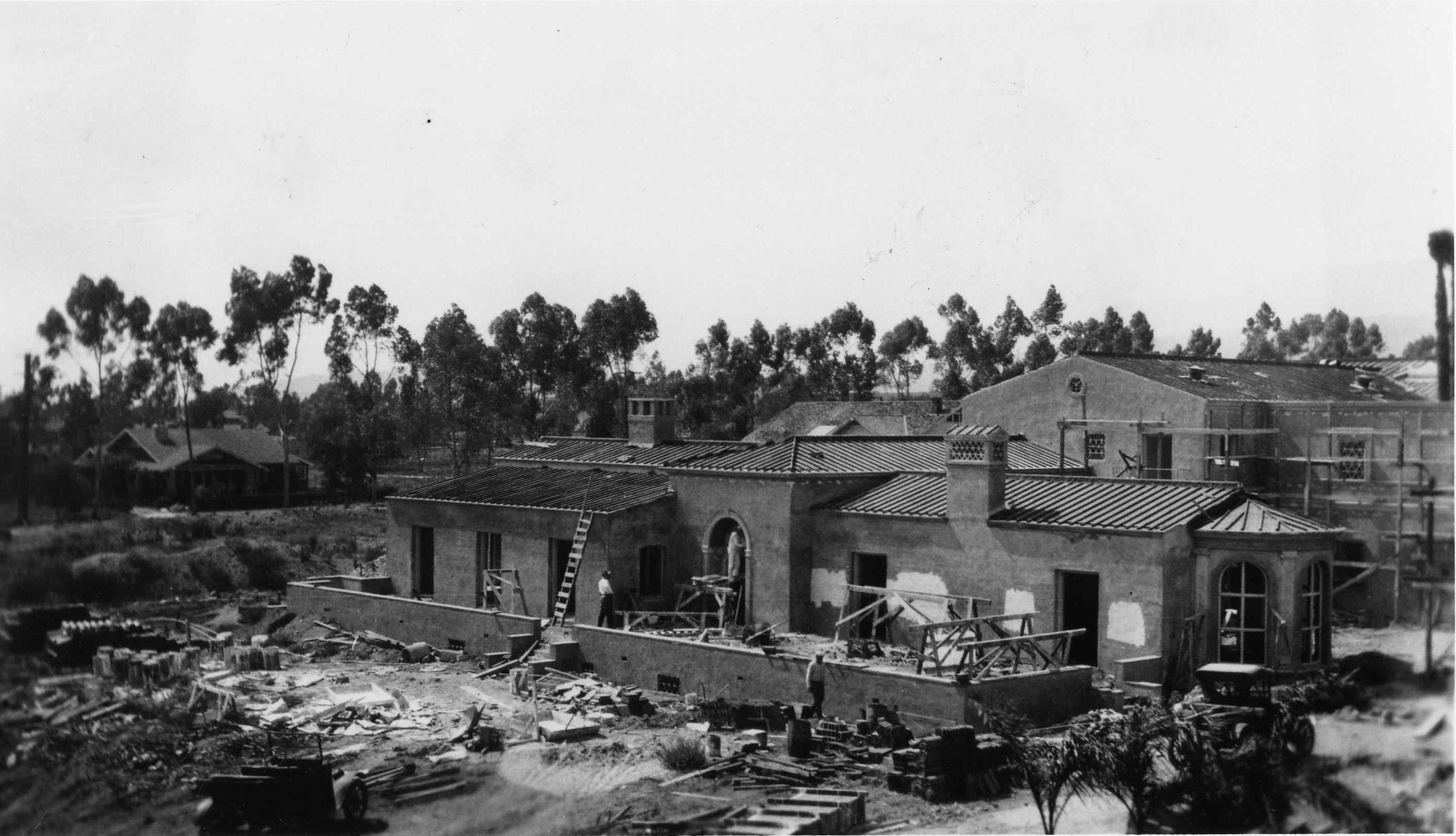
Construction of Toll Hall c. 1927

Scripps College was founded in 1926, following the coeducational Pomona College and Claremont Graduate University. Soon after, the first dormitory, created in 1927, was dedicated in memory of trustee Eleanor Joy Toll. Ernest J. Jaqua was inaugurated as the first president of Scripps College in the same dedication ceremony of Toll Hall. The second dormitory, established as a "sister building" to Toll Hall, was dedicated to Grace Scripps Clark, the niece of Ellen Browning Scripps and daughter of James E. Scripps, in November 1928. Balch Academic Hall and Browning Residence Hall, named for trustee Janet Jacks Balch and founder Ellen Browning Scripps, respectively, were dedicated in a joint ceremony in September 1929. Despite being designed by different architects, both halls adopted a "'Mediterranean' motif" unique to the campus.

=== Postwar era ===
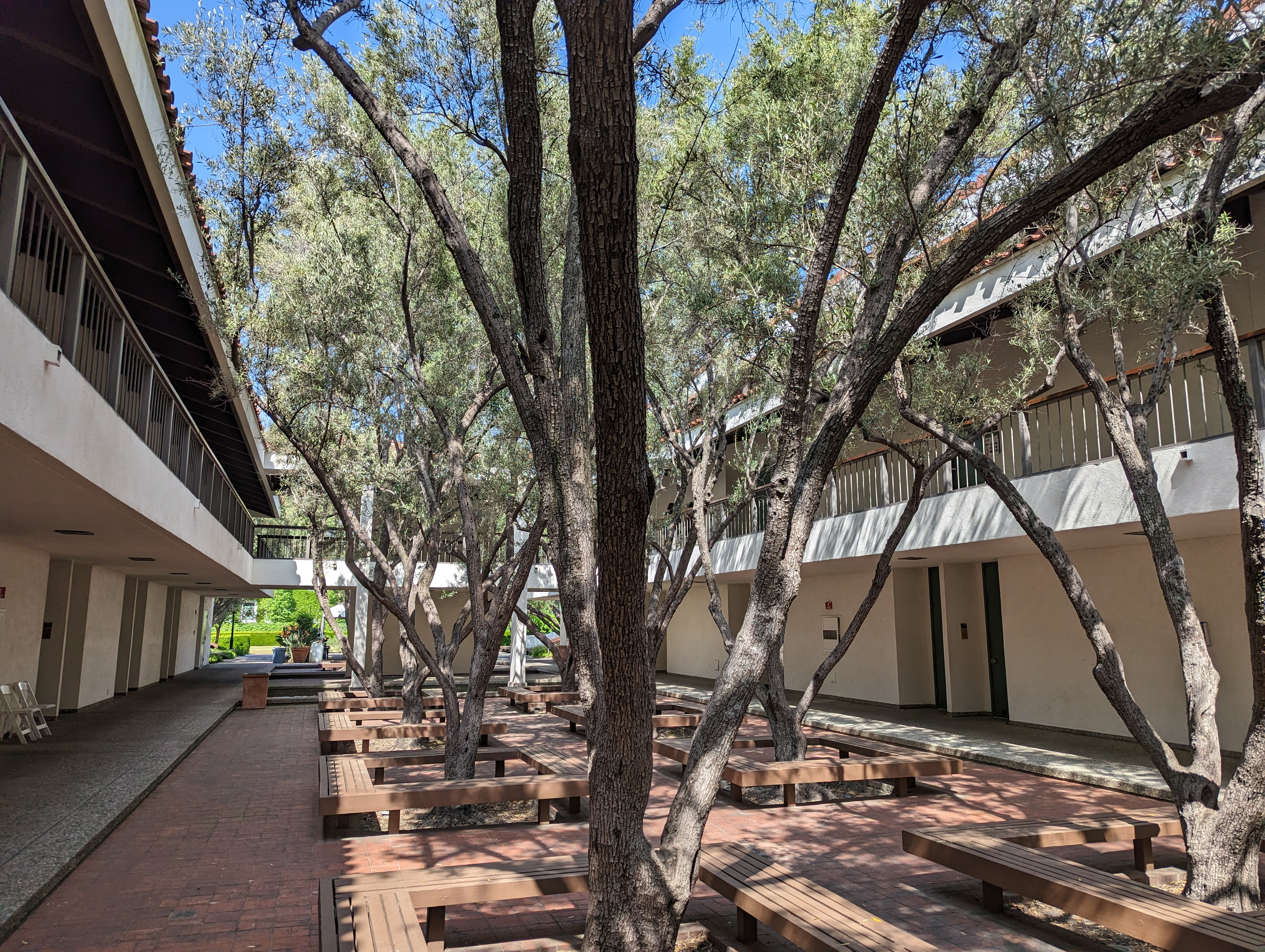
Olive tree grove in the Humanities Building

Over time, the college has moved away from its finishing school origins.

In 1958, the college opened the Music Building with a recital hall seating 150, a music library, classrooms, practice rooms, and faculty offices. The project was designed by Smith and Williams of Pasadena and funded by trustee Lucille Phillips Morrison.

In 1968, students occupied a grove of olive trees to save them from being cut down to make space for construction of the humanities building.

=== 21st century ===
In 2000, the college opened a centralized dining facility, Malott Commons, ending the practice of serving meals in the residence halls.

In 2014, the college began admitting transgender women.

== Campus ==
- Scripps College
- U.S. National Register of Historic Places
- U.S. Historic district
- Area: 17.5 acres (7.1 ha)
- Architect: Gordon B. Kaufmann
- Architectural style: Spanish Colonial Revival, Mediterranean Revival
- NRHP reference No.: 84000887
- Added to NRHP: September 20, 1984

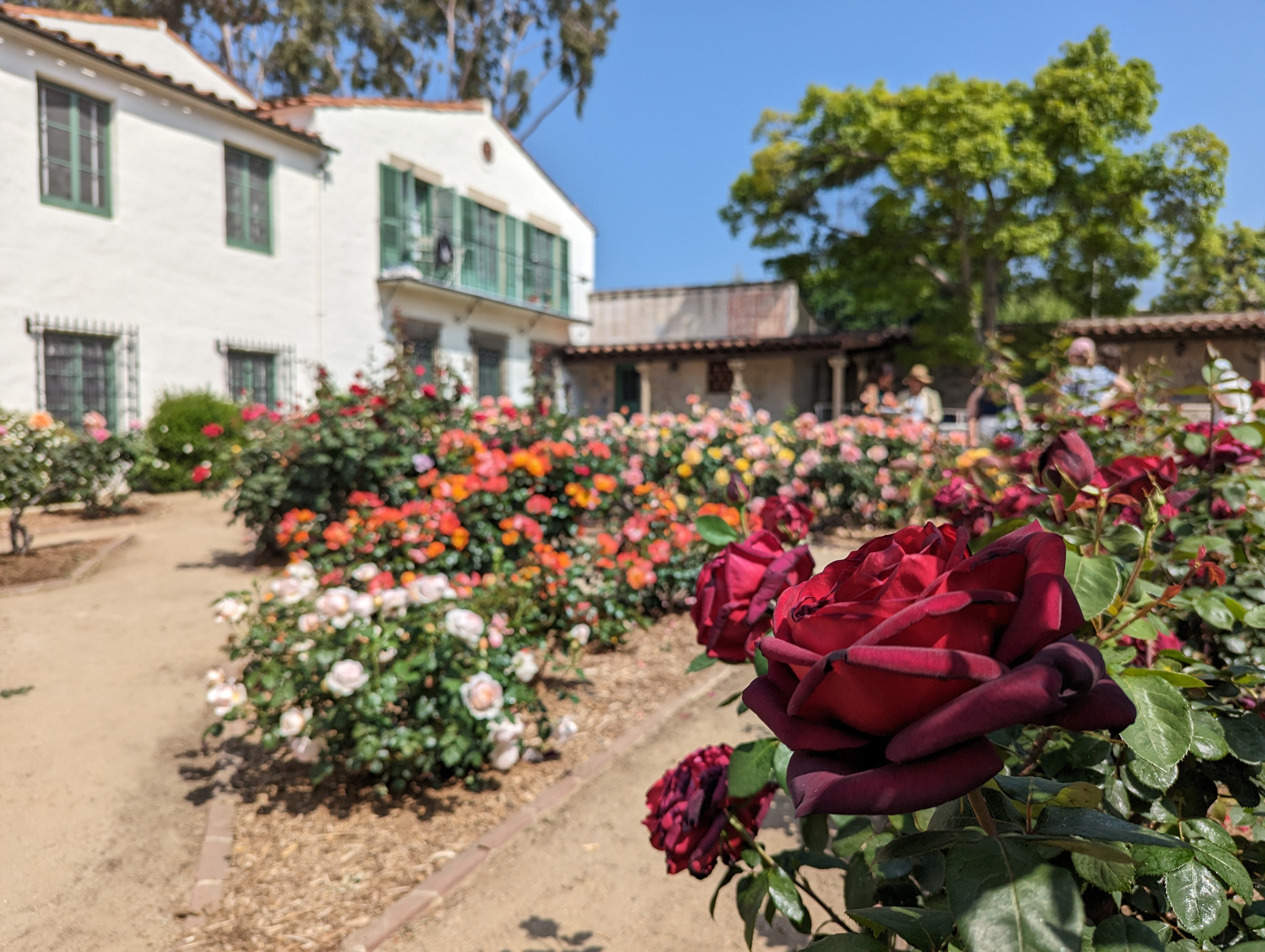
The Scripps College Rose Garden

Scripps College is frequently described as one of America's most beautiful college campuses and has been listed in the National Register of Historic Places since 1984. In its 2017 edition of The Best 379 Colleges, the Princeton Review cited the campus as the 12th-most beautiful in the United States, as has been corroborated by Forbes, U.S. News & World Report, The Huffington Post, and others.

Scripps College was the first recipient of the Getty Campus Heritage Initiative Program, which documented aspects of the college that were deemed historically significant and at risk of change. The original historic precinct was recorded and the history of each site (such as residence hall or garden) was given, an original appearance was described, and a recording of changes over time was taken. Different courtyards on site, such as the Sicilian Court, Iris Court, and Margaret Fowler Garden were surveyed and adjusted to resemble their initial designs wherever possible.

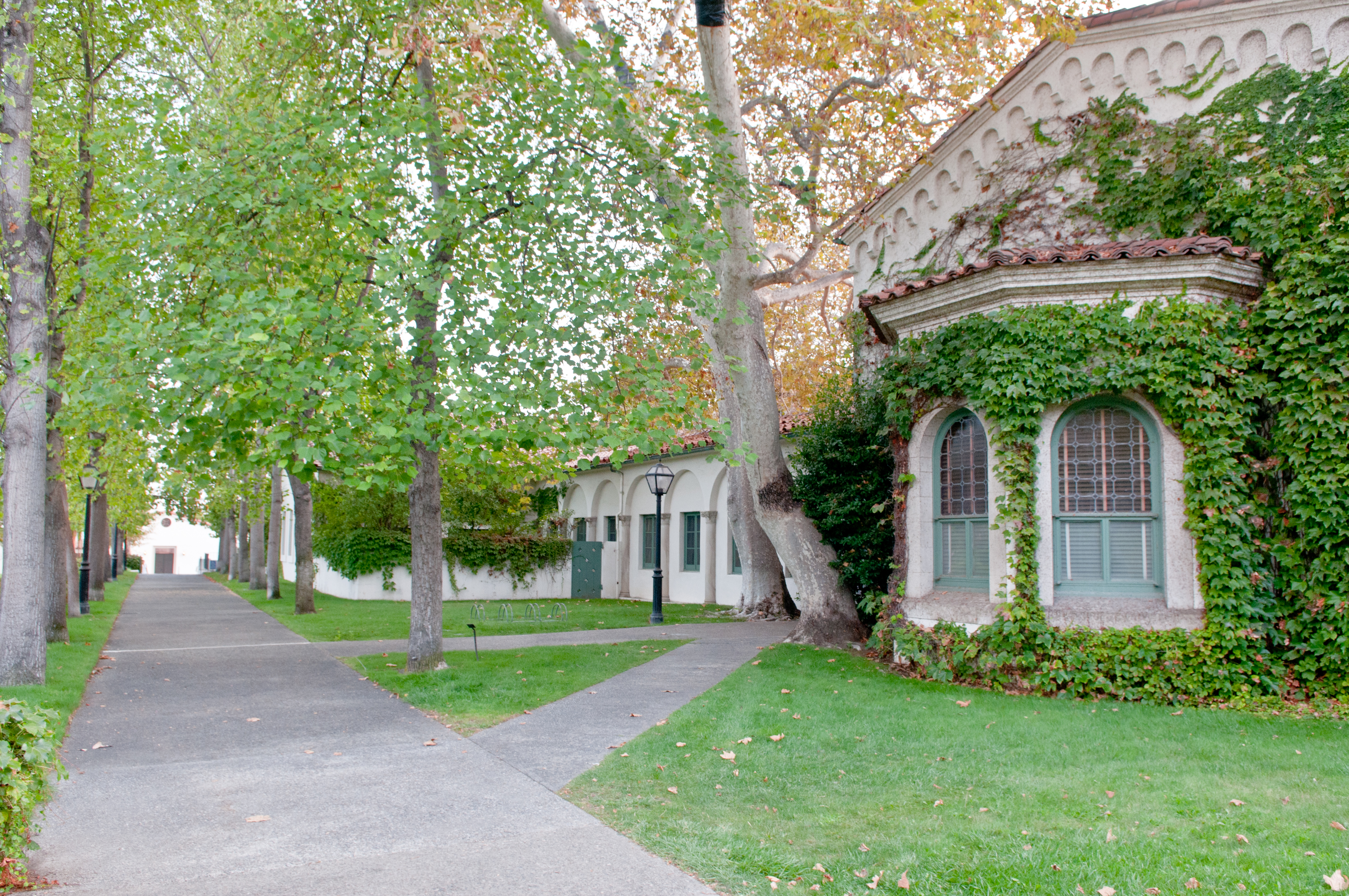
Balch Hall

Scripps is in the center of the Claremont Colleges, with Harvey Mudd College to the north, Pitzer College to the east, Claremont McKenna College and Pomona College to the south, and Claremont Graduate University to the west. The original campus was designed by Gordon Kaufmann in the Spanish Colonial Revival style, featuring extensive use of domestic spaces that catered to a 1920s conception of femininity. In general, his 1926 campus plan has been carefully preserved, with major vistas linking the central areas. The overall planting schemes and landscaping devised by Edward Huntsman-Trout are still followed.

The campus offers a number of interactive landscaping elements, including a rose garden to the north designated for community cutting and fruit trees available for picking. Oranges, grapefruits, pomegranates, kumquats, and loquats are available to students. Scripps also harvests olives from its olive trees and presses it into award-winning olive oil.

Several facilities are shared by the members of the Claremont Consortium. Scripps shares the Keck Science Center with Pitzer College. The Claremont Colleges Library (also known as Honnold/Mudd Library) holds more than 3.4 million items as of 2023, of which 1 million are physical and 2.3 million are digital. The consortium also owns the Robert J. Bernard Field Station north of Foothill Boulevard.

Courtyards at Scripps

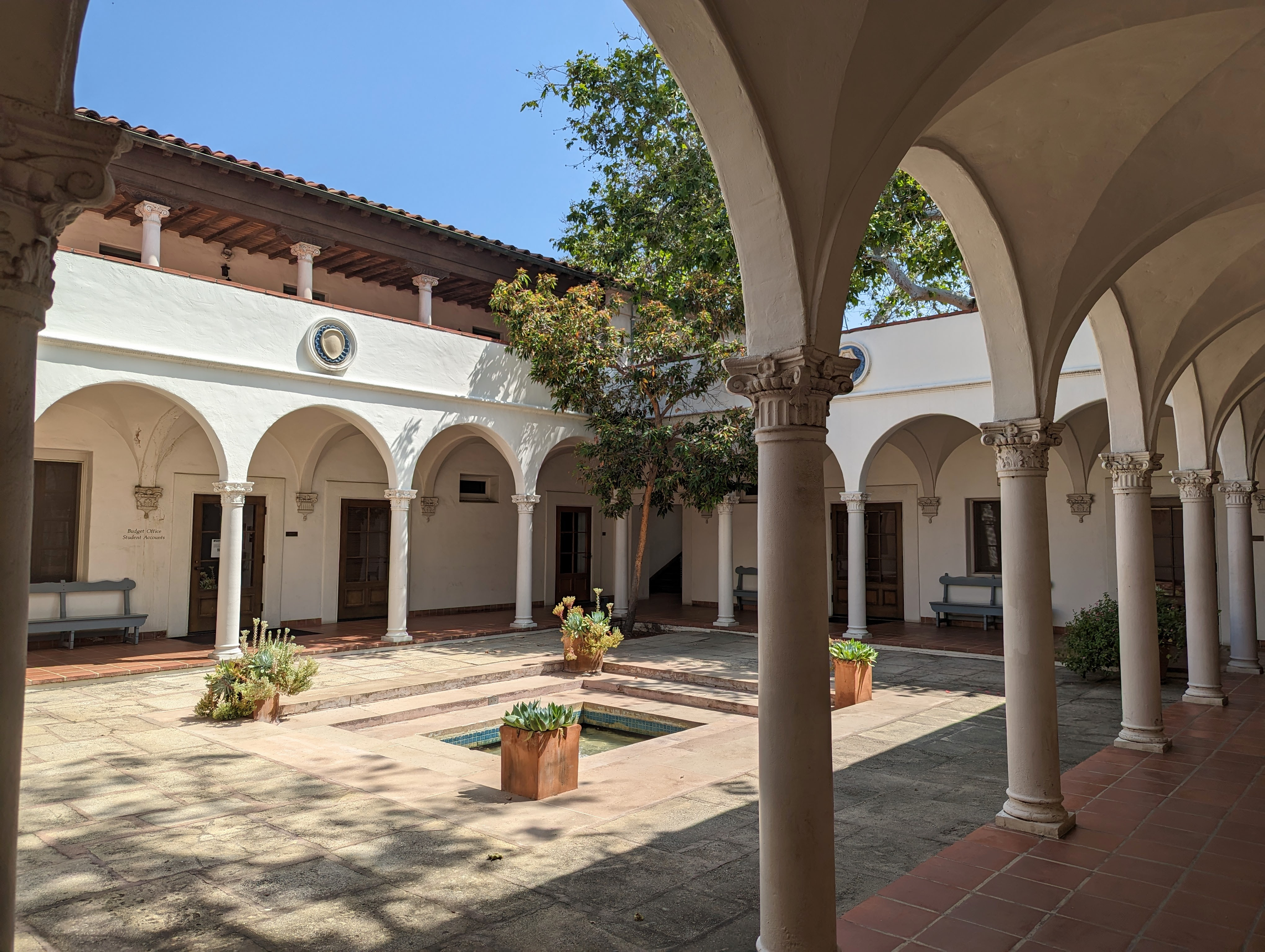
Eucalyptus Court in Balch Hall (view as a 360° interactive panorama)

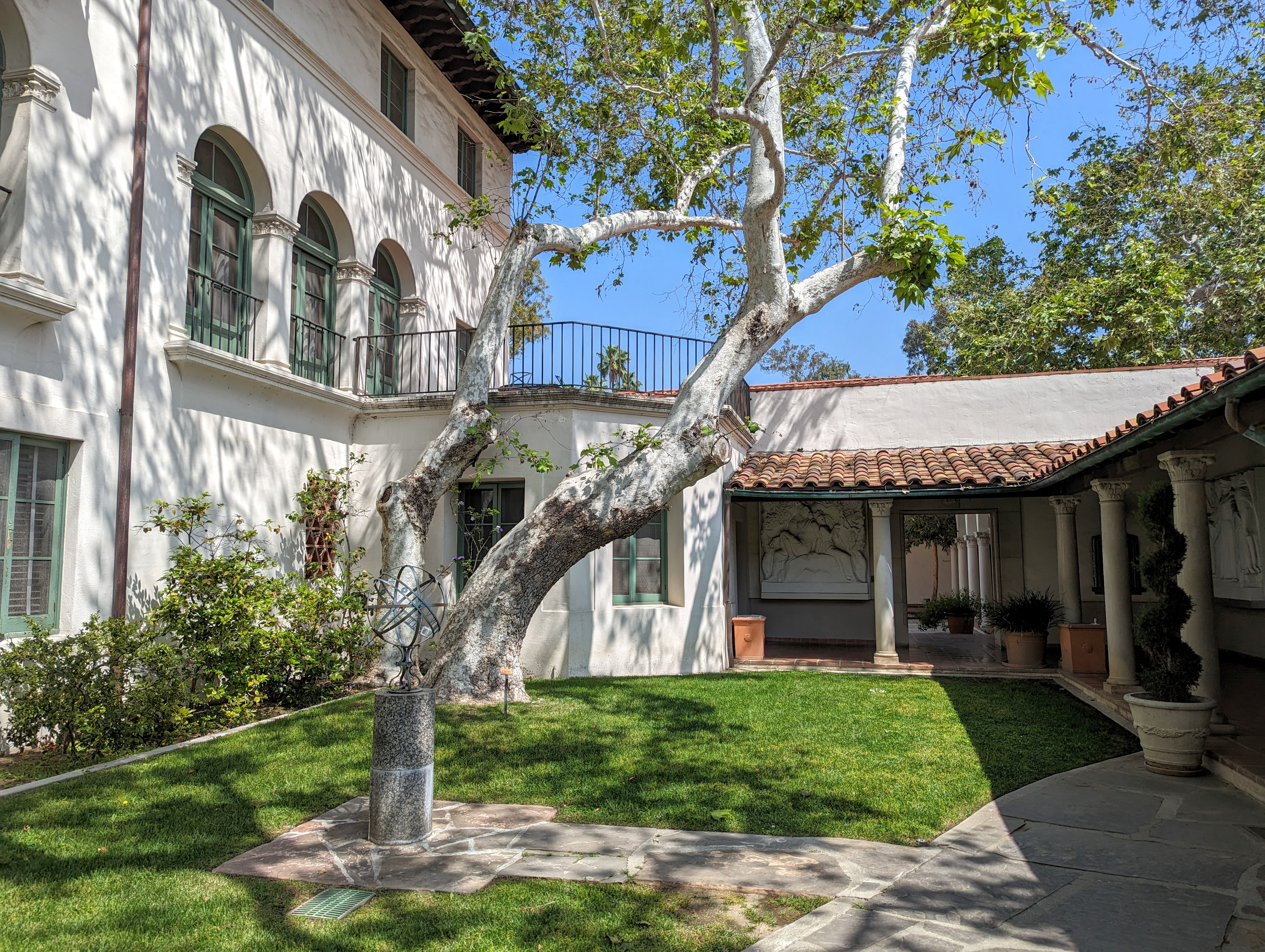
Sycamore Court in Balch Hall (view as a 360° interactive panorama)

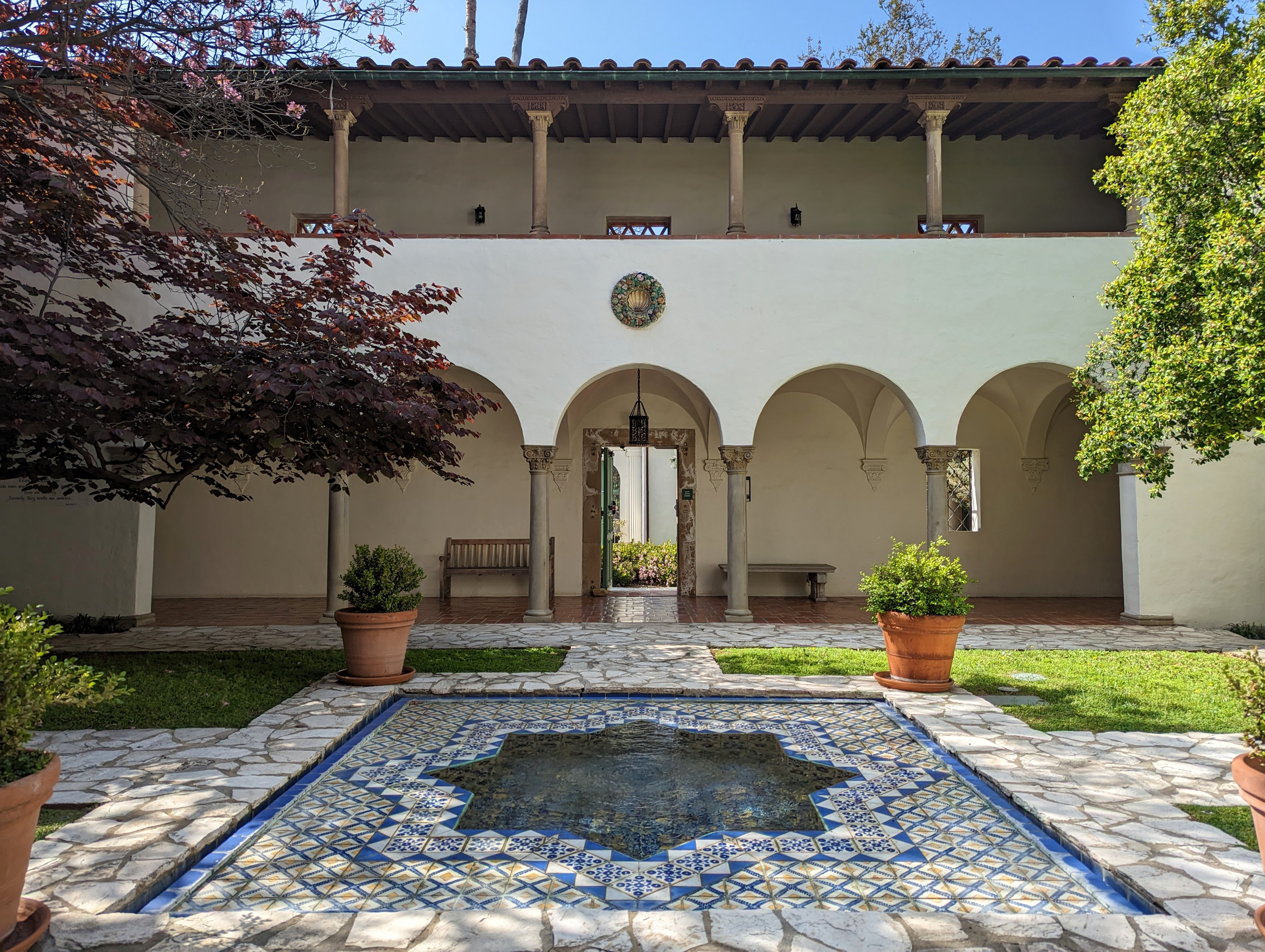
Star Court in Toll Hall (view as a 360° interactive panorama)

=== Ruth Chandler Williamson Gallery ===
Scripps College is home to the Ruth Chandler Williamson Gallery, which maintains the college's permanent art collection of 14,000 objects spanning 3,000 years. Objects are available for use in classes, displayed in campus exhibitions, and loaned to other exhibiting institutions. Among the collection's holdings are works by American artists Andy Warhol, Ansel Adams, Winslow Homer, Mary Cassatt, Childe Hassam, and John James Audubon, and an extensive collection of paintings by the California artist and Scripps Professor Emeritus Millard Sheets. The gallery also holds an extensive collection of Japanese woodblock prints.

=== Margaret Fowler Garden ===
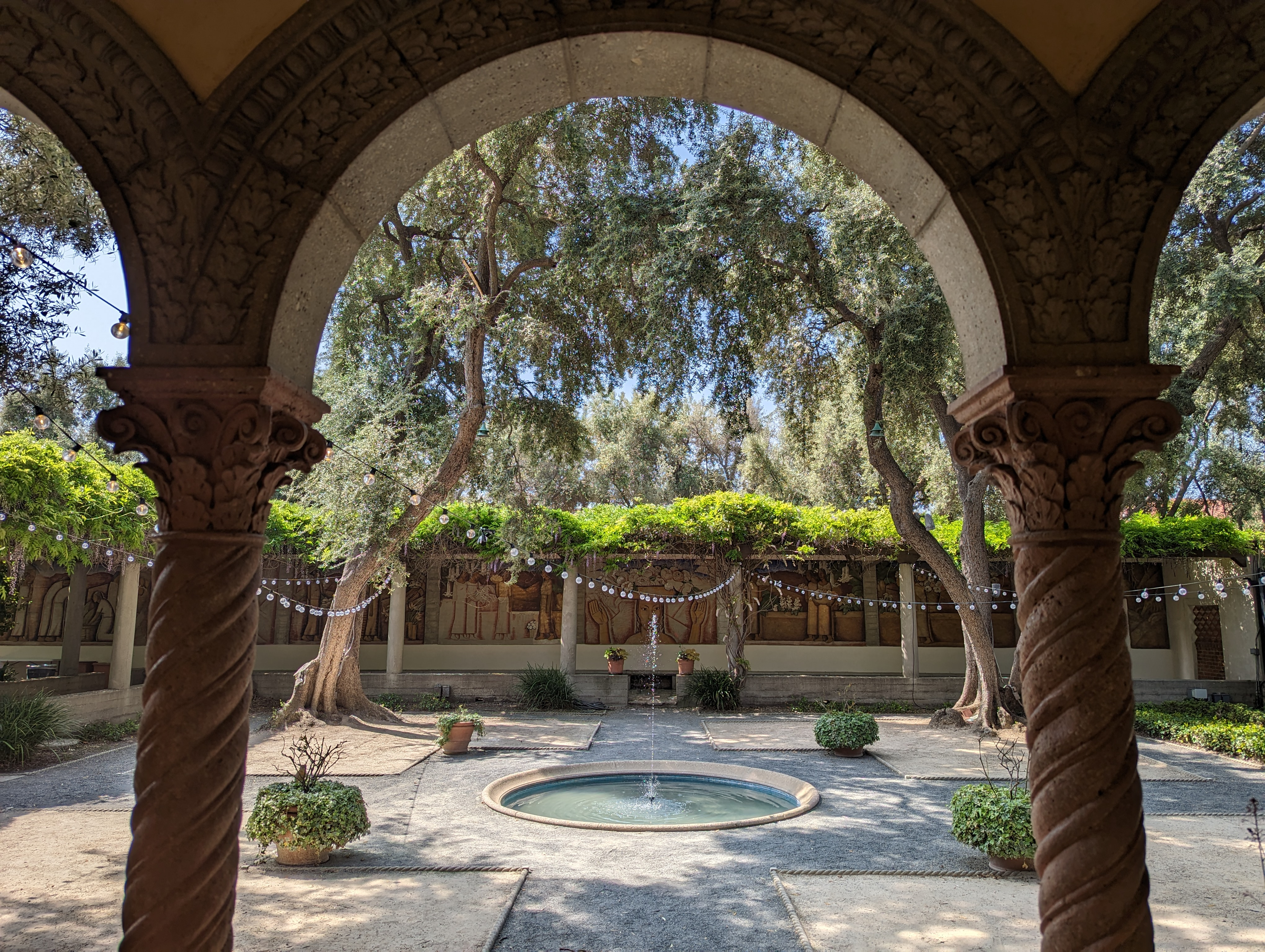
The Margaret Fowler Garden (view as a 360° interactive panorama)

Originally designed as a European medieval-style cloister garden east of a proposed (but never built) chapel, the Margaret Fowler Garden is a walled garden on the Scripps College campus. It is laid out in two distinct sections: the western area contains a sculpture by Albert Stewart, "Eternal Primitive", a central pool, and four walkways extending in the cardinal directions. The eastern end has a Mediterranean-style tiled wall fountain and open flagstone area. Arcades run along the north and south sides of the garden.

On the south wall of the Margaret Fowler Garden are murals by Alfredo Ramos Martínez. The college commissioned Martinez in 1945 to paint a mural, "The Flower Vendors", on the south wall of the Fowler garden. Martínez sketched the composition on the plaster wall and began working on several panels before dying unexpectedly on November 8, 1946, at age 72, leaving the mural unfinished. In 1994, a grant from the Getty Endowment allowed the mural to be conserved.

=== Environmental sustainability ===
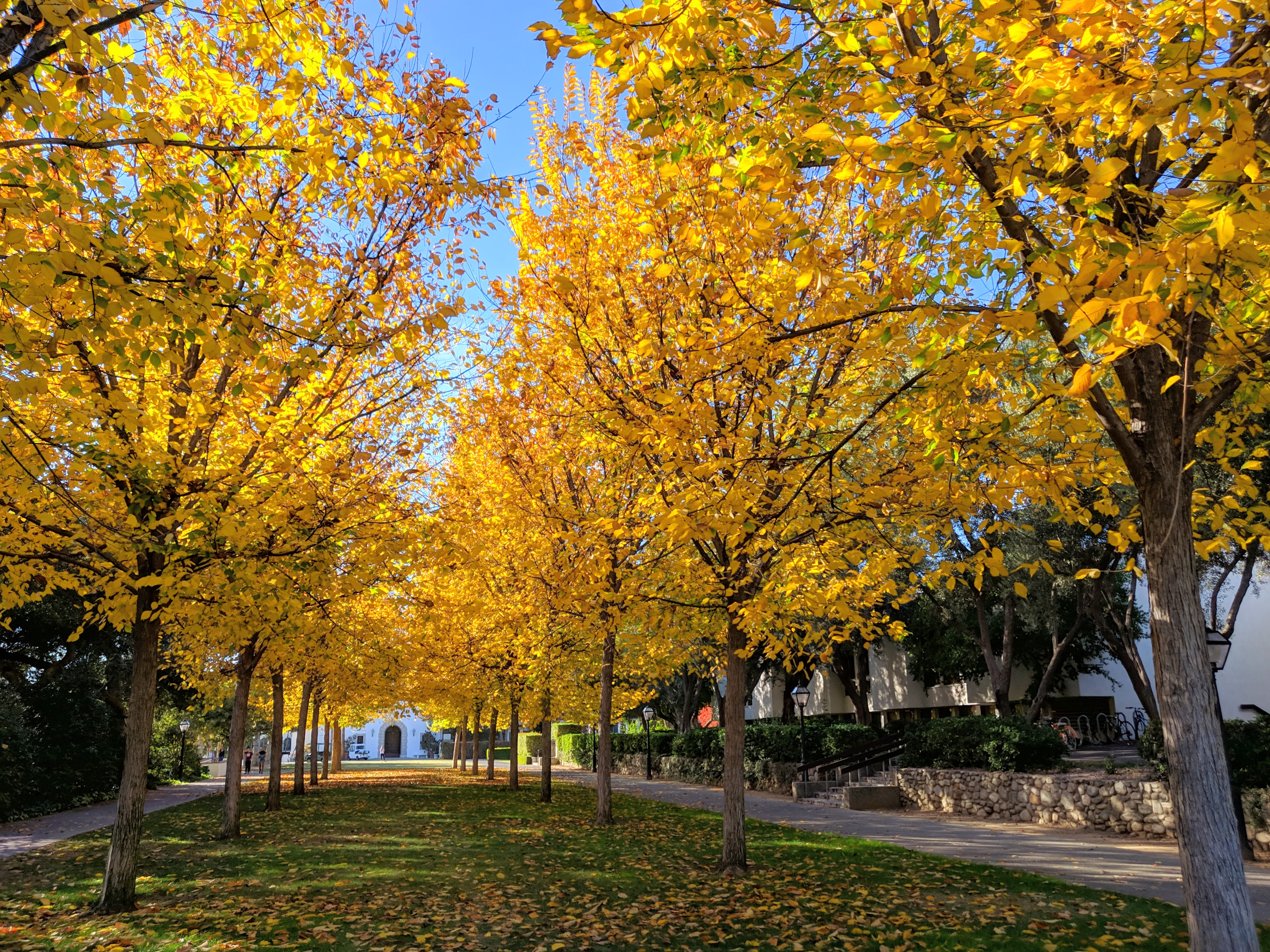
Scripps' Elm Tree Lawn, replanted in 2008, features Princeton elms.

Scripps College has several sustainability initiatives underway, from energy conservation to green building practices. On the conservation front, the college has seen monetary and energy savings through use of a new energy management system, and has designed water systems to cut down on waste. Turning "Alumnae Field" into a natural surface also helped in efforts to conserve water. Scripps has also downsized trash bins and made "to-go" containers recyclable, in order to divert more waste from landfills. On the emissions reductions front, maintenance staff use electric blowers and carts (as opposed to gas powered equipment), while a ride-sharing program is available for students, faculty and staff.

For its practices regarding sustainability, Scripps earned a B− on the College Sustainability Report Card 2011, published by the Sustainable Endowments Institute. This grade reflects a quantitative analysis of the effectiveness of the institution's policies. The college received positive recognition for student involvement, on-campus transportation, its food and recycling programs, water programs, and LEED buildings, but fared poorly on the shareholder involvement evaluation category of the report.

== Organization and administration ==
Scripps is governed as a nonprofit organization by a board of trustees responsible for overseeing the college's long-term interests.

The college has an endowment of $478 million as of November 2023.

The college's motto is "Incipit Vita Nova" ("Here Begins New Life"), from Dante's New Life.

== Academics ==
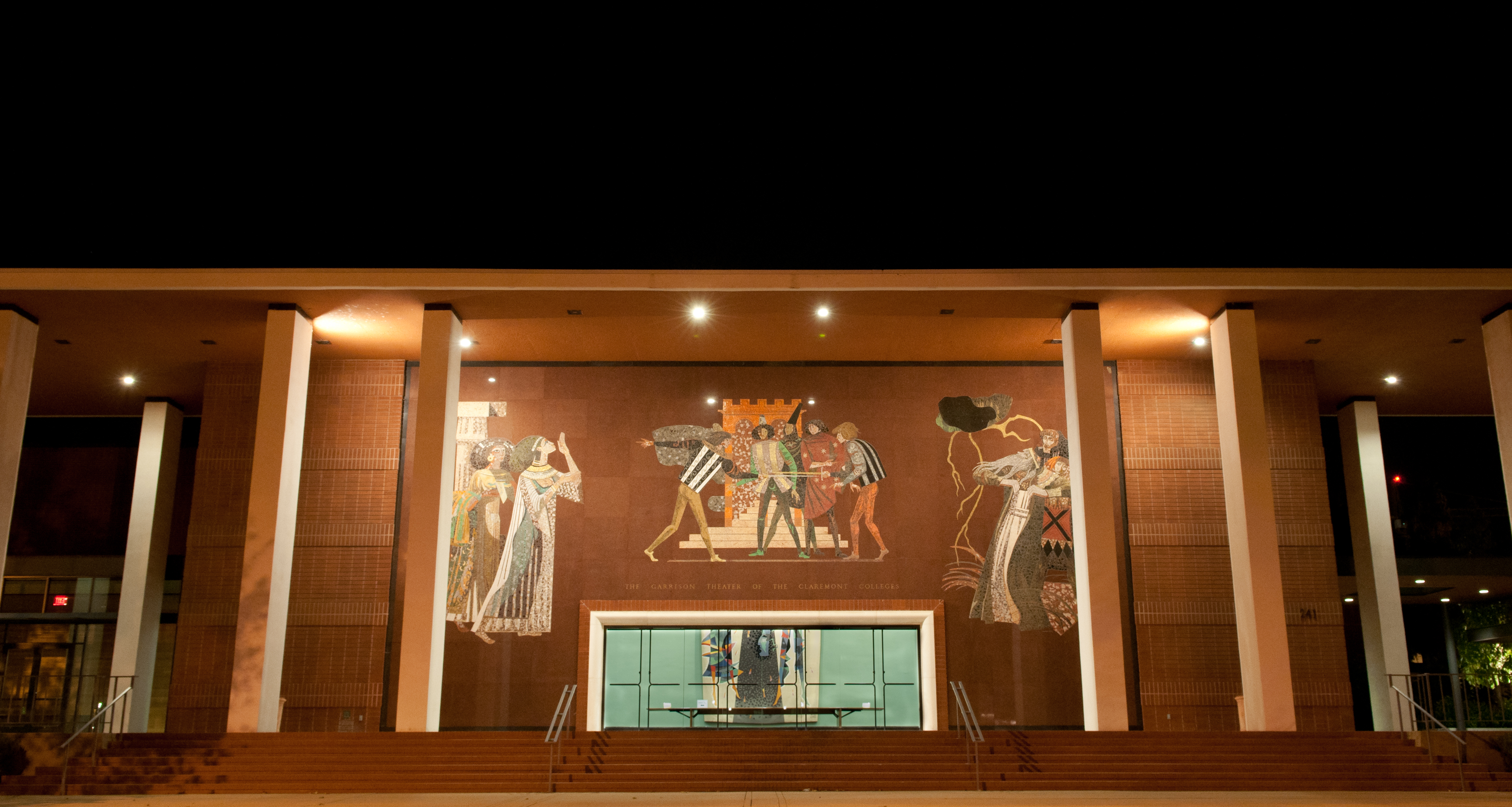
Scripps' Garrison Theater is one of the largest performance spaces at the Claremont Colleges, and frequently hosts talks by distinguished speakers.

Scripps is a member of the Claremont Colleges, and much of student life revolves around the five colleges, or "5Cs." Scripps College, Claremont McKenna College, Pomona College, Pitzer College, and Harvey Mudd College not only interact socially, but also share dining halls, libraries, and other facilities spread throughout their campuses. All five colleges, along with Claremont Graduate University and Keck Graduate Institute of Applied Life Sciences, are part of the Claremont University Consortium.

Scripps students can cross-register for classes at or enroll in the majors of any of the undergraduate schools at The Claremont Colleges. Classes average 16 students, with an overall student-to-teacher ratio of 10:1. More than 21% choose to double or dual major by the time they graduate. All courses are taught by faculty.

Academics are focused on interdisciplinary humanities, combined with rigorous training in the disciplines. General requirements include classes in mathematics, fine arts, letters, natural sciences, social sciences, foreign language, women's/gender studies, and race/ethnic studies. Scripps also requires first-year students to take a writing course in their first semester. Each graduating student must complete a senior thesis or project. Its most popular majors, by number out of 227 graduates in 2022, were:

- Political Science and Government (23)
- Research and Experimental Psychology (18)
- Biology/Biological Sciences (17)
- English Language and Literature (15)
- Environmental Science (15)
- Neuroscience (13)
- Mass Communication/Media Studies (13)
- Econometrics and Quantitative Economics (12)

A key part of the Scripps experience is the Core Curriculum in Interdisciplinary Studies, a sequence of three classes that encourage students to think critically and challenge ideas. Every first-year student takes Core I in the fall, which introduces students to major ideas. Core II seminars focus on specific ideas introduced in Core I. The seminars are usually team-taught by two professors from different fields, such as physics and art. The concluding Core III classes culminate in individual projects that often lead to students' senior thesis or project.

=== Reputation and rankings ===
Academic rankings

Liberal arts
- U.S. News & World Report: 44
- Washington Monthly: 83

National
- Forbes: 218
- WSJ/College Pulse: 65

Scripps is regarded as the premier women's college in the American West.

The 2025 annual ranking by U.S. News & World Report categorizes Scripps as 'more selective', and ranks it 44th best liberal arts college in the nation, 80th for "Best Value," tied for 144th in "Top Performers on Social Mobility", and the fifth best women's college after Wellesley College, Smith College, Bryn Mawr College and Mount Holyoke College. Forbes in 2019 rated it 60th in its "America's Top Colleges" ranking of 650 schools, which include military academies, national universities, and liberal arts colleges. Kiplinger's Personal Finance places Scripps at 39th in its 2019 ranking of 149 best value liberal arts colleges in the United States. Washington Monthly ranked Scripps 83rd in 2024 among 194 liberal arts colleges in the U.S. based on its contribution to the public good, as measured by social mobility, research, and promoting public service.

=== Admissions ===
Admissions statistics
- 2019 entering class
- Admit rate: 32.0% (▲ +4.8)
- Yield rate: 29.2% (▼ −3.6)

Test scores middle 50%
- SAT EBRW: 673–740
- SAT Math: 660–750
- ACT Composite: 30–33

High school GPA^{[ii]}
- Top 10%: 77.8% (▼ −5.2)
- Top 25%: 97.8% ( +0.8)
- Top 50%: 100.0% ( no change)

For the Class of 2023 (enrolling fall 2019), Scripps accepted 967 of the 3,022 applicants (32.0%).

Scripps College does not require the SAT or ACT exams for students applying for admission. For the Class of 2023, of the 62.2% of enrolled freshmen submitting SAT scores the middle 50% range was 673–740 for evidence-based reading and writing, 660–750 for math, while the ACT Composite middle 50% range was 30–33 for the 50.9% who submitted scores. The average high school GPA of incoming freshmen was 4.20.

== Student life ==
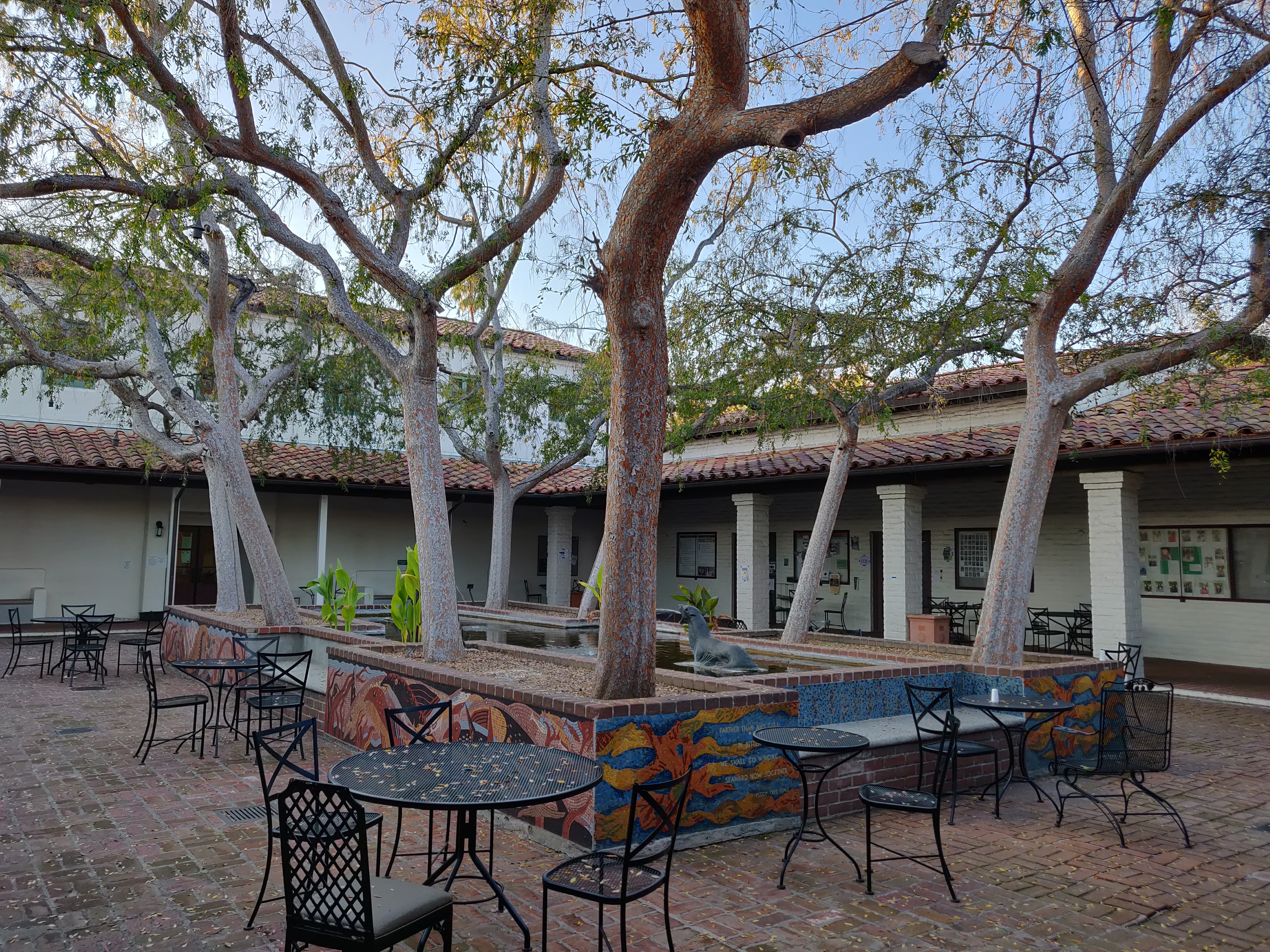
Seal Courtyard, with Malott Commons at left and the Motley Coffeehouse at right

The Scripps student body consists of 1109 students as of 2019. Roughly half of students are white, and nearly all are female. The median family income of Scripps students is $160,700, with 49% of students coming from the top 10% highest-earning families and 15% from the bottom 60%.

=== Residential life ===
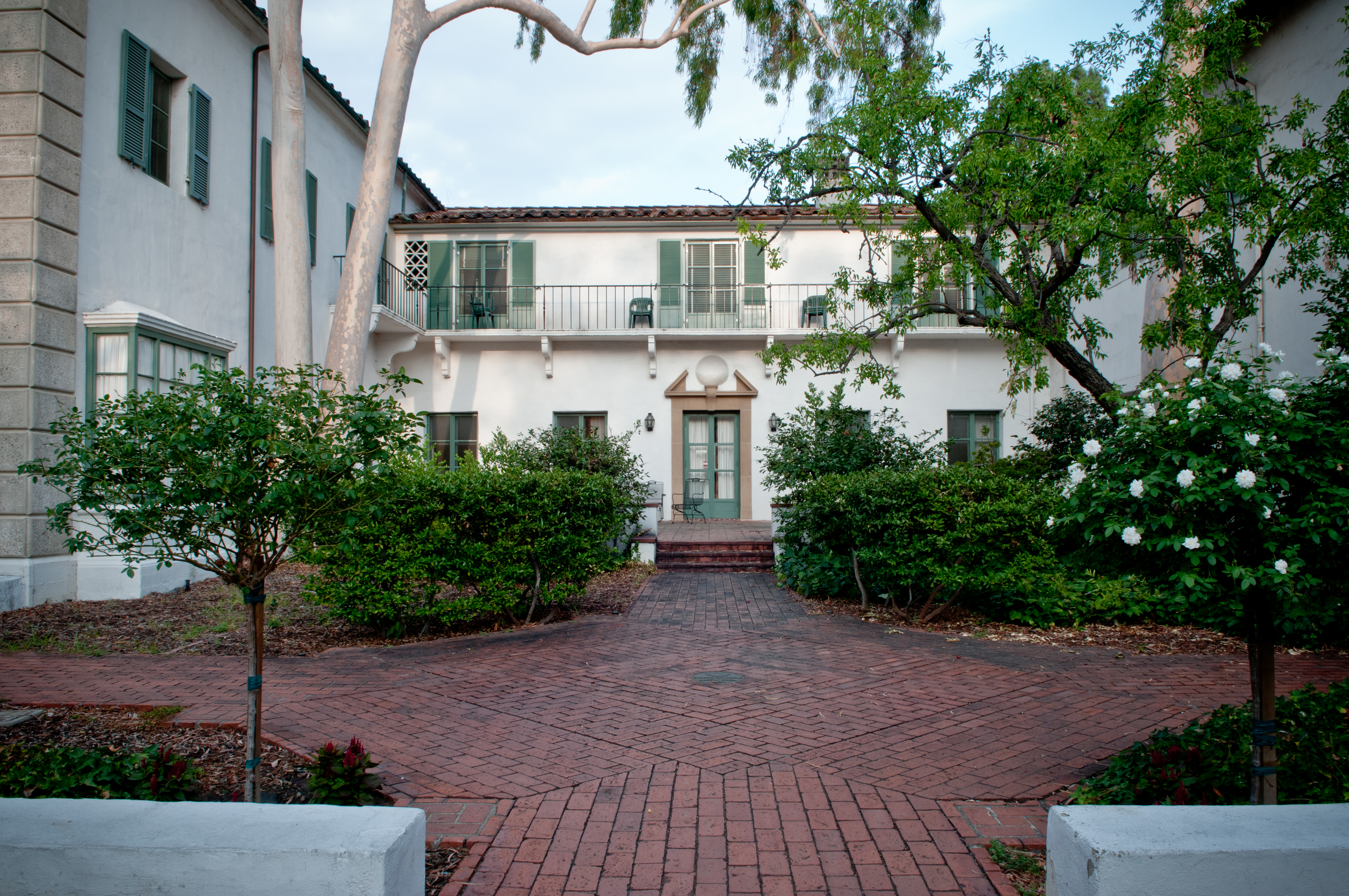
Browning and Dorsey residence halls

Scripps is a residential campus, with nine halls and on-campus apartments providing living arrangements for all four years of undergraduate study. In 2017, The Princeton Review included Scripps in several of their rankings, such as "Best College Dorms" (#5), "Most Beautiful Campus" (#12), and "Best Campus Food" (#13).

All residence halls are mixed-class halls; first-year students, sophomores, juniors, and seniors live in one shared community. The number of residents in each hall ranges from 70 to 120.

In October 2014, an anonymous donor gave $10 million to support the construction of a tenth residence hall, named Nan Elizabeth Walsh Schow Hall.

=== Student organizations ===
The Claremont taiko ensemble performs on the Wood Steps

There are a number of registered clubs and organizations (abbreviated CLORGs) at Scripps. Scripps students also frequently participate in 5C clubs alongside students from the other Claremont Colleges. In total, there are nearly 300 clubs and organizations across the 5Cs.

A student-run feminist coffeehouse known as The Motley is a popular hangout spot and focal point for social life at the college. The college also has a center for leadership, called the LASPA center, that runs leadership programming, events, networks, and workshops for students accepted into the program

There are several media organizations at the Claremont Colleges, the largest of which is The Student Life, the oldest college newspaper in Southern California. It publishes a weekly print edition as well as online content. Additionally, Scripps has a college-specific newspaper, The Scripps Voice. Pomona also has a student-run radio station, KSPC. The Claremont Independent, a conservative magazine, has produced articles about the 5Cs' political culture that have been picked up by national conservative media outlets and drawn criticism from many students. The Golden Antlers publishes satirical content.

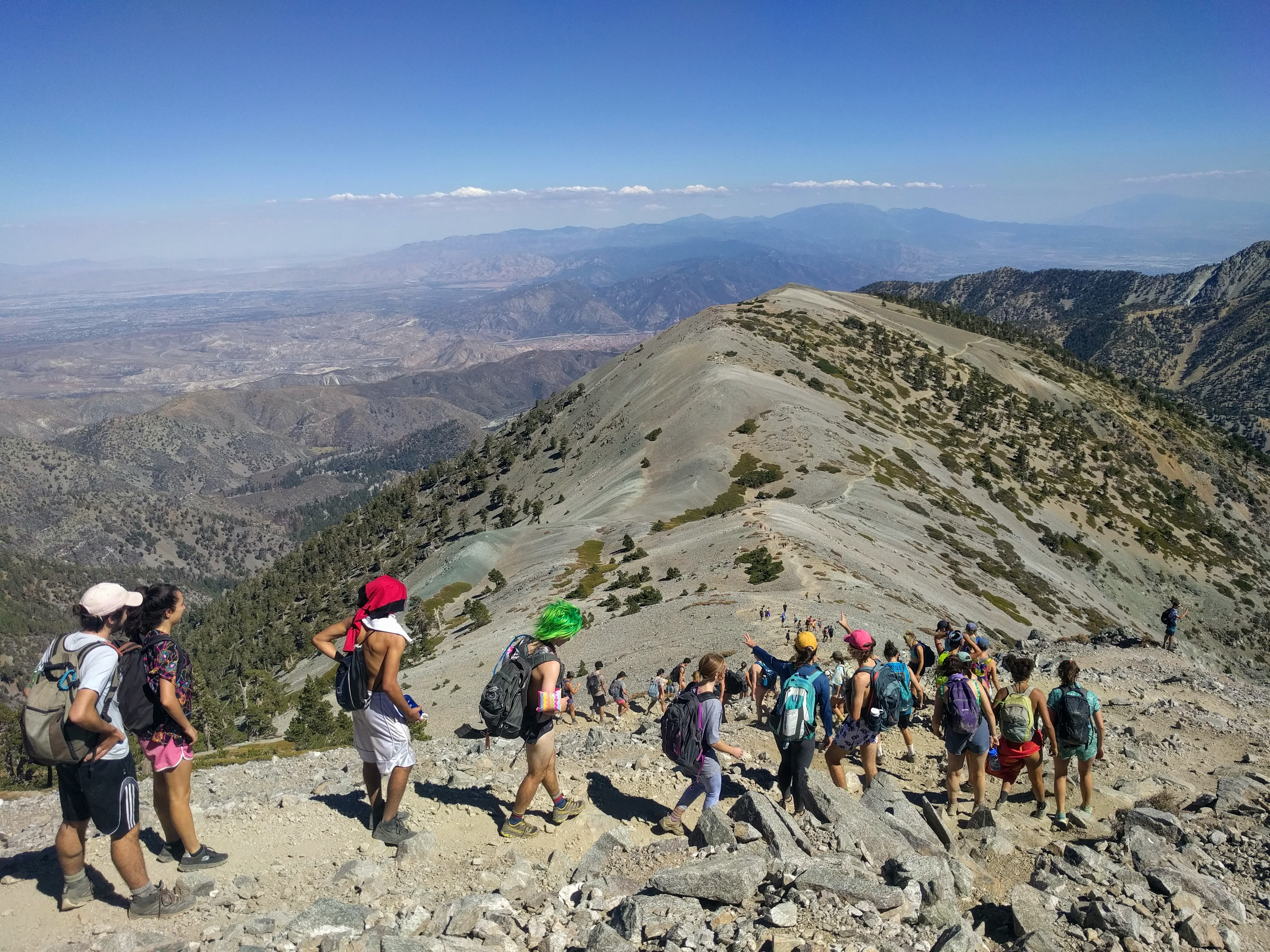
An On the Loose hike descends from the summit of Mount Baldy toward the Devil's Backbone ridge in the San Gabriel Mountains north of campus.

On the Loose (OTL), the outing club of the 5Cs, sponsors trips to outdoors destinations. Its flagship event, an annual hike up Mount Baldy in swimwear or goofy costumes, can draw more than 100 participants. It is affiliated with the Outdoor Education Center of Pomona College (OEC), which lends equipment to students for free and provides outdoor leadership training.

There are several dance groups on campus, including the Claremont Colleges Ballroom Dance Company (CCBDC), which has more than 130 dancers, making it the third-largest collegiate program in the U.S. It has won multiple national championships. The Pomona College Theater Department produces four mainstage productions and a dance concert each year, and there are several smaller student-run productions as well. The 5Cs have two improv groups, Without a Box and Underground Theatrical Institution (UTI).

There are eight a cappella groups on campus. One, the Claremont Shades, hosts the annual SCAMFest concert, which draws singers from other Southern California colleges. Another, Midnight Echo, hosts the less extensive annual Human Symphony. The other six groups are the Ninth Street Hooligans, Blue & White, After School Specials, Earth Tones, Mood Swing, and One Night Stanza.

== Athletics ==
Scripps varsity athletes compete alongside athletes from Claremont McKenna College and Harvey Mudd College (other consortium members) as the Claremont-Mudd-Scripps Stags and Athenas. The teams participate in NCAA Division III in the Southern California Intercollegiate Athletic Conference.

=== Athletics history ===
According to the Division III Fall Learfield Director's Cup Standings for the 2023–2024 year, CMS ranks 19th among all Division III programs, and first among SCIAC colleges. In 2016–17, the CMS golf team ranked first among NCAA Division III teams according to Golf Digest, and 17th overall (including Division 1 schools). The rankings are based on the "Balanced" category which is "for students who place equal emphasis on school and sports".

=== Sports ===
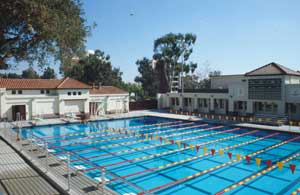
Axelrood Pool

Female Scripps athletes compete on the 11 CMS women's teams:

- Basketball
- Cross Country
- Golf
- Lacrosse
- Soccer
- Softball
- Swimming and Diving
- Tennis
- Track and Field
- Volleyball
- Water Polo

There are also 10 CMS men's teams, but these have few if any Scripps athletes.

=== Rivals ===
The other sports combination of the Claremont Colleges, and CMS' primary rival, is the team made up of Pomona College and Pitzer College known as the Pomona-Pitzer Sagehens (P-P).

== Notable alumni ==
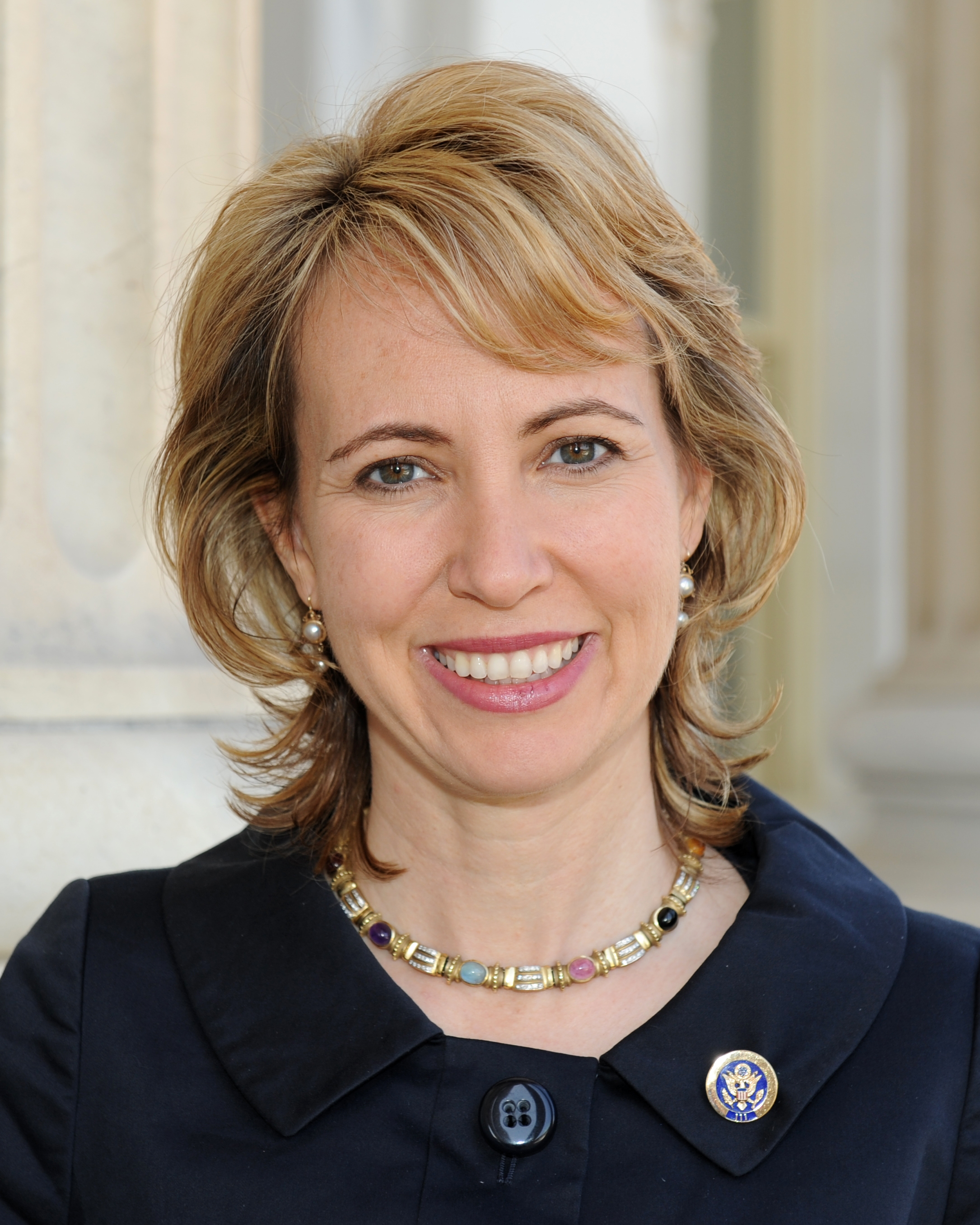
Former U.S. Representative Gabby Giffords (D‑AZ 8th), class of 1993

| Name | Class year | Notability | Ref. |
|---|---|---|---|
| Anne Hopkins Aitken | 1932 | Zen Buddhist in the Harada-Yasutani lineage | |
| Helene Mayer | Exchange student 1932–1934 | Olympic gold medalist fencer who competed for Nazi Germany despite being Jewish | |
| Nancy Neighbor Russell | 1953 | Founder, Friends of the Columbia Gorge | |
| Molly Ivins | Attended 1962–1963 | Newspaper columnist | |
| Beth Nolan | 1973 | White House Counsel for Bill Clinton | |
| Harriet Doerr | Attended 1975–1976 | Novelist | |
| Alison Saar | 1978 | Sculptor and installation artist known for work on black identity | |
| Elizabeth Turk | 1983 | Sculpture artist | |
| Merodie A. Hancock | 1987 | Academic and president of Thomas Edison State University | |
| Gabby Giffords | 1993 | Democratic U.S. Representative for Arizona's 8th district, gun control advocate | |

== Bibliography ==
- Fiske, Edward B. (2022). Fiske Guide to Colleges 2023 (39th ed.). Naperville, Illinois: Sourcebooks. p. 157. ISBN 978-1492665007.
- Horowitz, Helen Lefkowitz (1993). Alma mater: Design and Experience in the Women's Colleges from their Nineteenth-Century Beginnings to the 1930s (2nd ed.). Amherst: University of Massachusetts Press. pp. 339–350. ISBN 9780870238697.
- Liu, Xiaohang (July 1, 2014). "Scripps College". The Insider's Guide to the Colleges. By Yale Daily News staff (41st ed.). New York: St. Martin's Press. pp. 59–61. ISBN 978-1-4668-4835-1.
