= List of college and university outing clubs =

This is a list of notable collegiate outing (outdoors) clubs, a student society centered on outdoor recreation.

== New Zealand ==
- Canterbury University Tramping Club

== United States ==
- Dartmouth Outing Club
- MIT Outing Club
- New Hampshire Outing Club
- On the Loose (Claremont Colleges)
- Society of Les Voyageurs (University of Michigan)
- Wisconsin Hoofers Outing Club
- Syracuse University Outing Club (Syracuse University)
