= Grant W. Sharpe =

- Born: 1926
- Died: 2006
- Citizenship: U.S.
- Known for: interpretation
- Scientific career
- Fields: interpretation, forestry, renewable resources

Grant W. Sharpe was a leading supporter of interpretation and a well-known environmental author.

Sharpe wrote about both interpretation but also forests as renewable resources. With co-authors John C. Hendee and Wenonah F. Sharpe he published Introduction to Forests and Renewable Resources now in its 7th edition (2009).

He was born in Ukiah, California in 1926 and died in Seattle, Washington in 2006.

To commemorate his work the region 10 of National Association for Interpretation gives an annual Grant W. Sharpe Award to an NAI Region 10 member that has made a major contribution in the field of interpretation or that help legitimize interpretation as a profession following Sharpe's work.
