= Outing club =

Student society for outdoor recreation

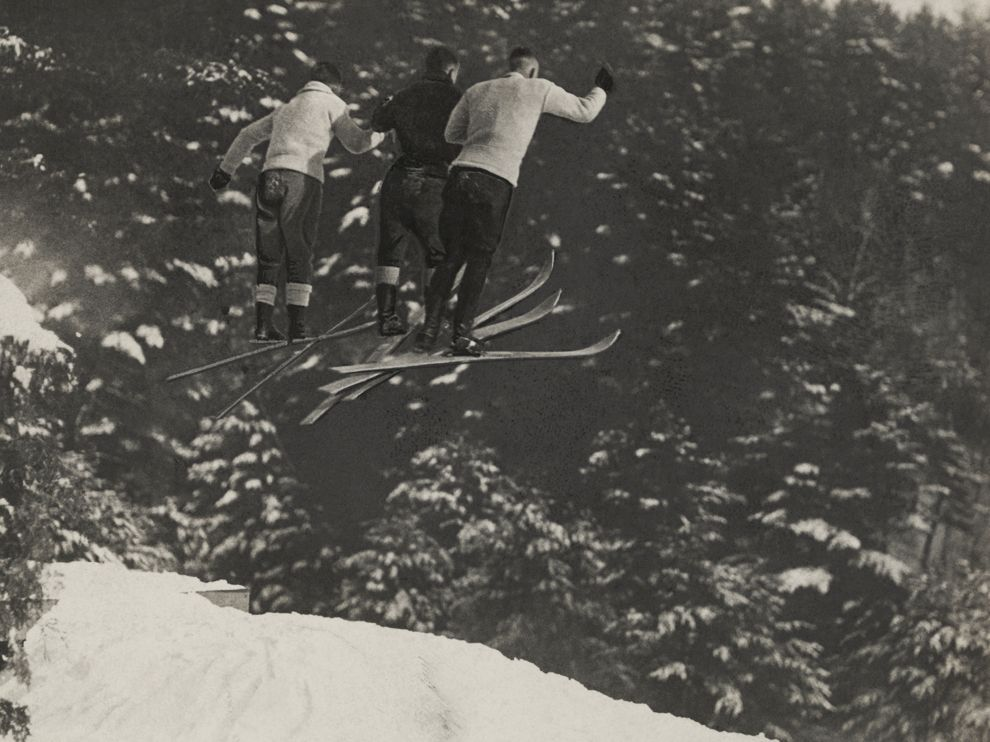
Ski jumping at a Dartmouth Outing Club event circa 1920

An outing club or outdoors club is a student society centered on outdoor recreation. Outing clubs provide their members with the planning, training, access, and equipment necessary to enjoy these activities.

== Origins ==
Some students' unions began planning wilderness outings in the late nineteenth century in response to the early American conservation movement. In 1909, students at New Hampshire's Dartmouth College organized a club around such outings, with a particular emphasis on winter sports. National Geographic published an article about a Dartmouth Outing Club skiing trip in 1920, and the following spring saw a 300 percent increase in applications for admission to the college. By 1932, 14 outing clubs had been founded at universities in the northeastern United States and southeastern Canada. These 14 clubs formed the Intercollegiate Outing Club Association (IOCA) to organize multi-club excursions. These clubs were based on the model established at Dartmouth, although similar groups had existed since at least 1888.

Outing clubs were especially popular before and during World War II. They offered a way for students to find transportation at a time when few had cars and when gasoline was rationed. Because many of these clubs were at single-sex schools, IOCA outings were a popular way for members to meet students of the opposite sex. According to Dr. E. John B. Allen of the New England Ski Museum, collegiate outing clubs played an important role in promoting and modernizing skiing in the United States in the 1920s and 1930s.

== Activities ==
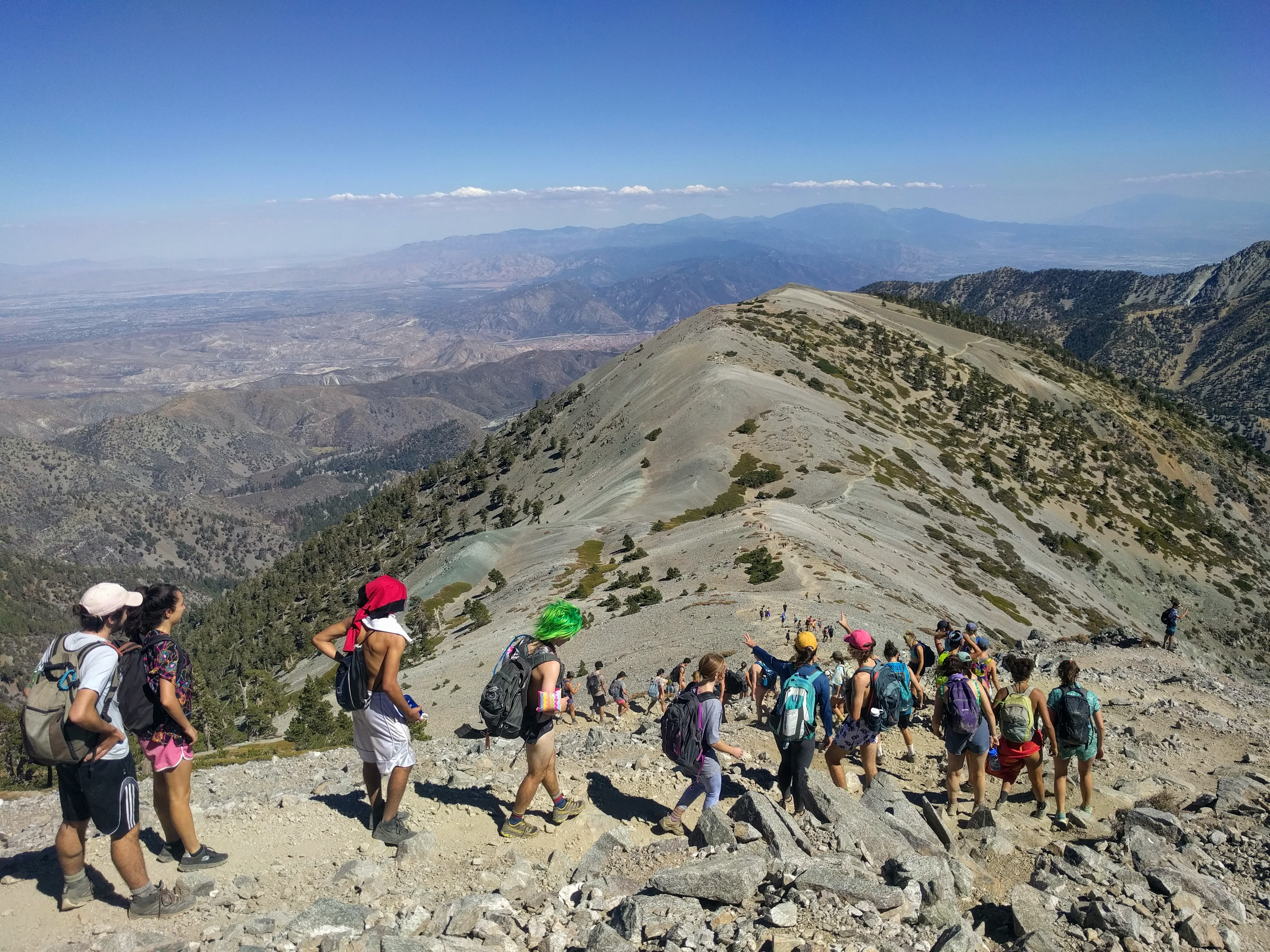
On the Loose, the outing club of the Claremont Colleges, hosts an annual hike up Mount Baldy in the San Gabriel Mountains in swimwear or goofy costumes.

An outing club participates in a variety of outdoor recreational activities. The specific activities depend on the club and may range from wilderness exploration (such as climbing, hiking, and canoeing) to more "extreme" sports such as snowboarding and hang gliding. Clubs typically provide gear and training for new members to help them participate safely.

Outing clubs often promote conservation through educational events or by participating in service projects, such as building or maintaining cabins or trails.

Singing and square dancing were also important outing club activities in the past, but this is less common today.

== Organization ==
Like other student societies, outing clubs are usually run and chartered by students of a college or university along with an advisor. Equipment and fees are funded by membership dues, shared trip costs, or donations.

Clubs tend to use a "common adventure" model, with democratic group decision-making and little bureaucracy. A trip may or may not have a designated facilitator or leader to enforce safety or legal guidelines. A less common trip model is the "guided or packaged trip," in which most details are planned in advance.

== See also ==
- List of college and university outing clubs
- Outdoor education
- Single-sport clubs: caving organizations, climbing club, cycling club, rowing club, etc.
