= On the Loose (outing club) =

Outdoors club for the Claremont Colleges

- Abbreviation: OTL
- Type: Outing club
- Headquarters: Outdoor Education Center, 601 Amherst Ave., Claremont, California, United States
- Coordinates: 34.1004°N 117.7099°W
- Affiliations: Claremont Colleges
- Website: on-the-loose.org

On the Loose (abbreviated OTL) is an outing club for the undergraduate Claremont Colleges (5Cs), a consortium of five highly selective liberal arts colleges based in Claremont, California. It organizes trips to outdoor destinations around Southern California and the Western United States.

The club was cited as a contributing factor to Pomona College's designation as a top college for hikers by Backpacker magazine.

== History ==
Pomona students camp on Mt. Baldy, 1903

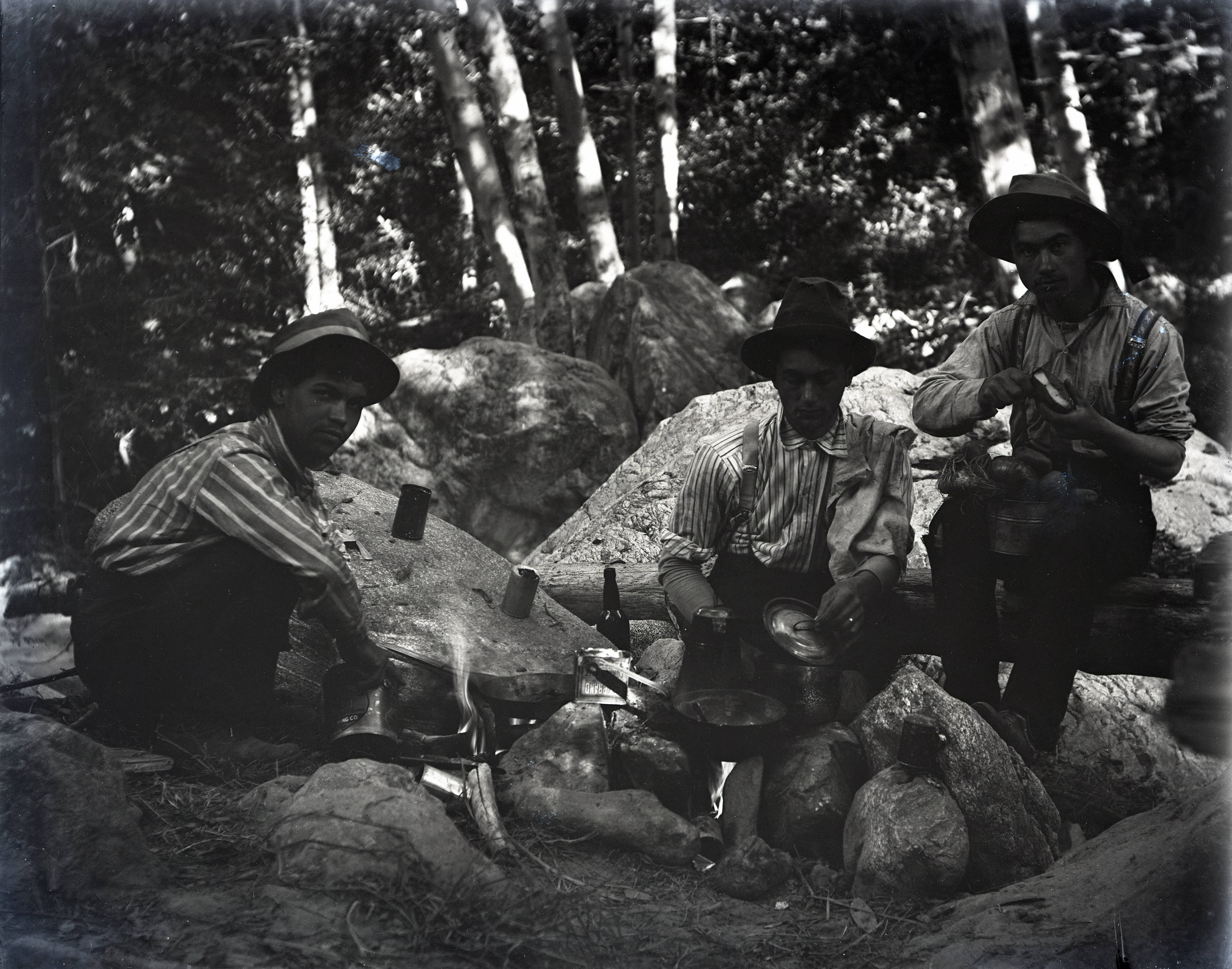
Campsite

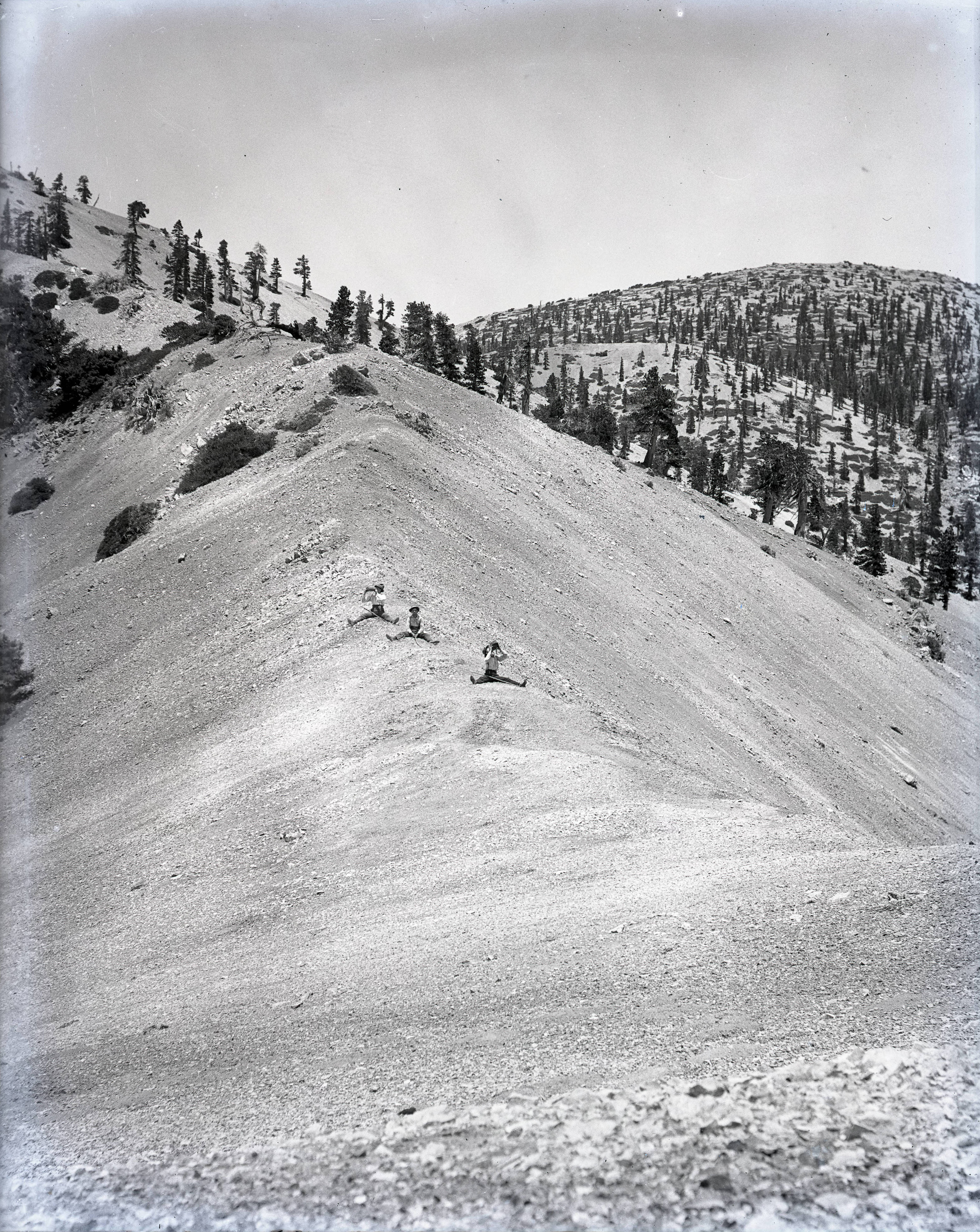
Straddling Devil's Backbone ridge

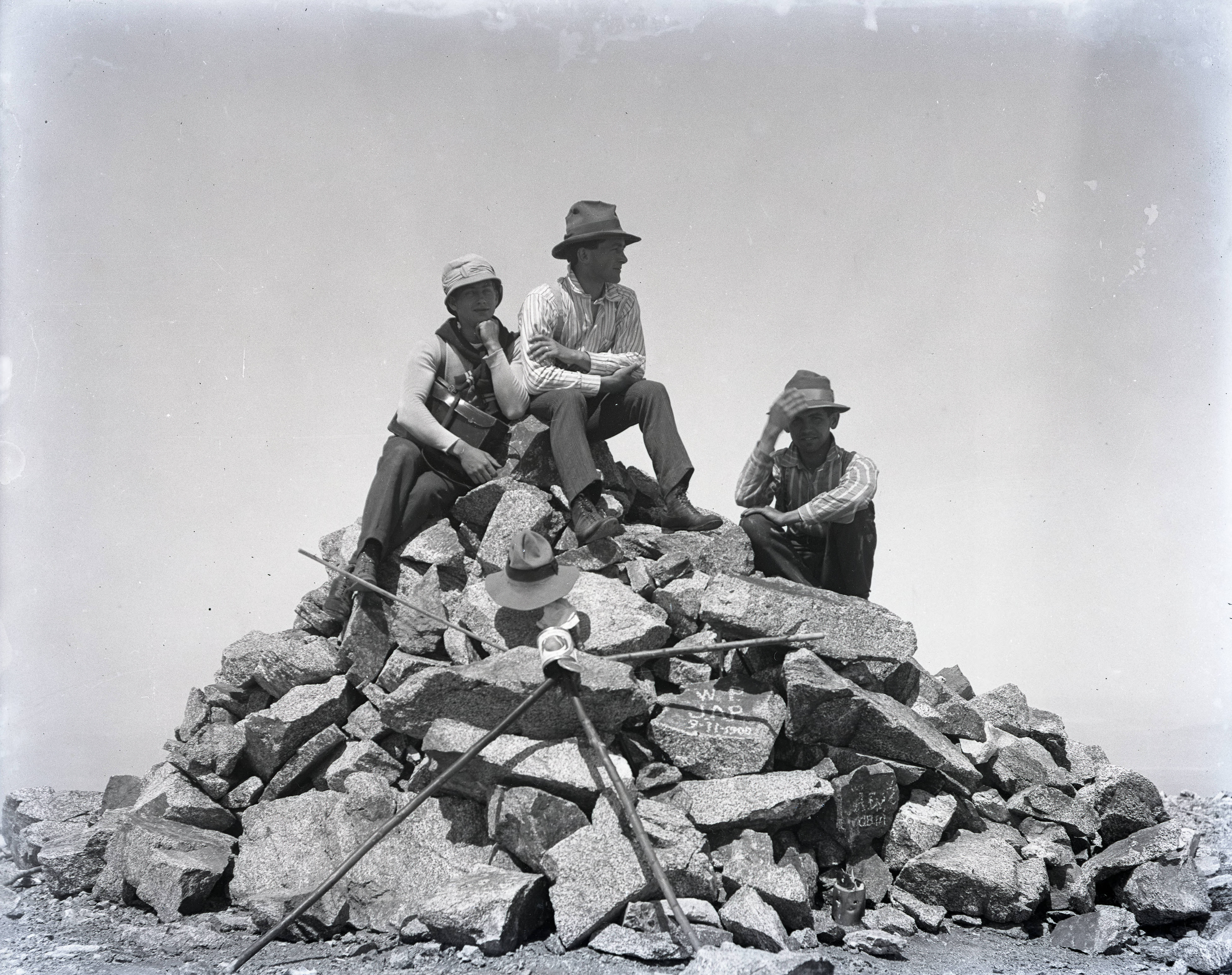
Summit cairn

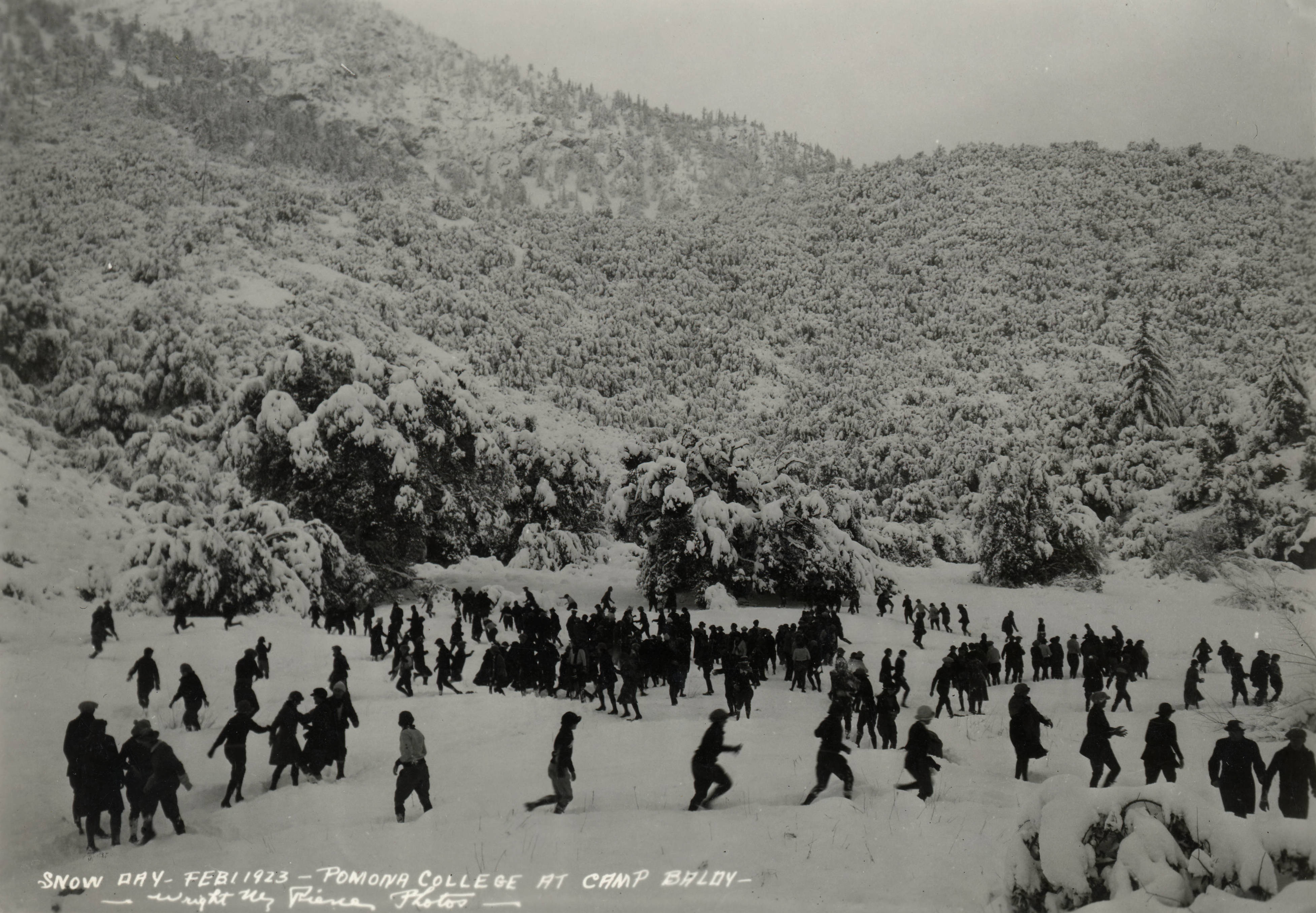
Pomona's 1923 Snow Day at Camp Baldy

The history of outdoors activities at the Claremont Colleges dates back to the inception of its founding member, Pomona College, in the 1880s. In his 1914 history of the college, founding trustee Charles B. Sumner recalls the exploratory spirit of the college's earliest students, traveling to the "literal wilderness" of the Inland Empire to create an environment "like a party in the woods preparing for a camp". The March 1920 edition of the Pomona College Quarterly Magazine observed the following:

Every college has its athletics. In this regard Pomona is not unique. The distinctive feature of Pomona's physical life is her mountains. In these she has a peculiar blessing. Common property of all persons who would visit them, the mountains belong to Pomona in a particular way: the whole-hearted manner in which her students, universally, employ their opportunity to use them. Many trails are followed weekly by Pomona men and women; countless canyons, peaks, and hidden nooks are ever the object of "hiking" parties; Camp Baldy is the haven for week-end parties; three fraternities, and other informal groups, have built cabins near the camp; a Mountain Day is observed by each class every semester; and cut in the brushwood near the first crest, where the snows frequently trace it in pure white, is the Pomona "P." This gift of the class of 1915 is the cherished emblem of the college. It marks Pomona's inheritance in the mountains.

In 1913, Pomona's Metate yearbook described the college's proximity to nature as one of its greatest advantages, and in 1923 it noted a women's hiking club. The college's retreat center in Idyllwild, California, Halona Lodge, was built in 1931. In his 1977 history of the college, E. Wilson Lyon observed that, at one point, "the climbing of Mt. Baldy was almost considered a requirement for graduation."

The precise founding date of OTL as a club in its current form is not currently known, but it dates back at least several decades. It was originally called the Outings Club, but was later renamed after a 1967 book, On the Loose, by Renny and Terry Russell. The club's operations became increasingly formalized following the establishment of the Outdoor Education Center of Pomona College in 2011.

== Activities ==
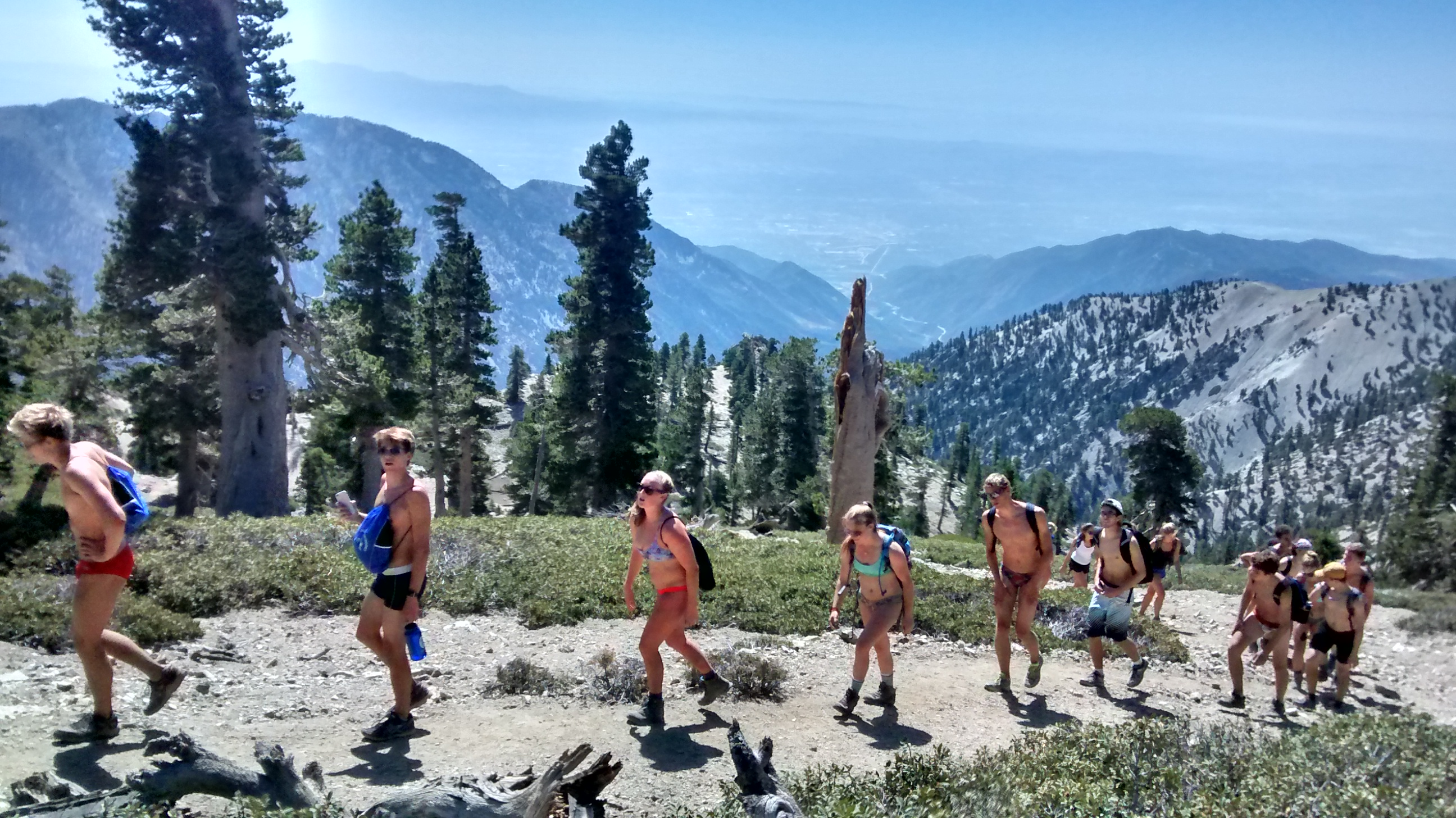
The 2015 Speedo Hike

OTL is one of the largest clubs at the 5Cs, and sponsors more than 150 trips per year. In the 2005–2006 academic year, more than 700 students went on trips totalling more than 4000 student days off campus. Frequent destinations include the San Gabriel Mountains, Los Angeles beaches, Joshua Tree National Park, Big Sur, the Sierra Nevada, and the Colorado Plateau. Trips are led by OTL leaders, who have passed a training. Prior to breaks, OTL holds "shindigs" during which trips are planned.

OTL's flagship annual event is a large hike up Mt. Baldy in swimwear or goofy costumes, which can draw more than 100 participants. It was begun in 2007 as the Speedo Hike, with speedos mandatory for men and bikinis mandatory for women, but the dress code was relaxed in subsequent years. In 2016, the hike was cancelled due to safety and inclusivity concerns, prompting criticism from several right-wing media outlets. It was revived the next year as a generic costumed hike, but many participants still don swimwear.

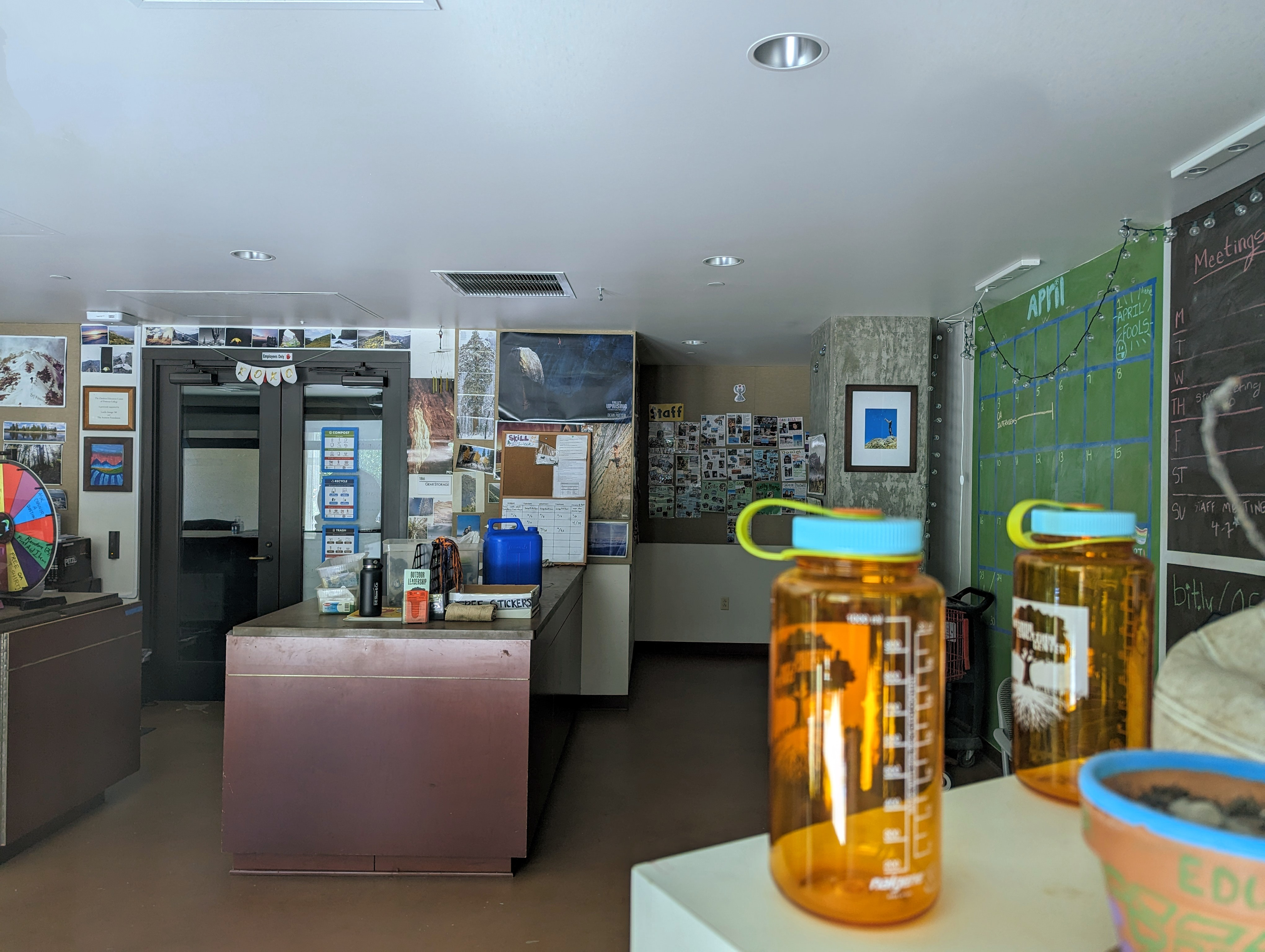
Pomona's Outdoor Education Center

OTL is separate from but affiliated with Pomona College's Outdoor Education Center, which teaches courses in outdoor leadership, rents equipment, and runs the Orientation Adventure program for all incoming students. It is also unaffiliated with Pomona's annual ski-beach day tradition.

== See also ==
- List of college and university outing clubs
- Southern California § Parks and recreation areas
