= Nancy Neighbor Russell =

American conservationist

Nancy Russell
- Born: Nancy Neighbor; January 11, 1932; Portland, Oregon, US
- Died: September 19, 2008 (aged 76); Portland, Oregon, US
- Monuments: Nancy Russell Overlook
- Education: Scripps College
- Organization: Friends of the Columbia Gorge
- Known for: Advocating Columbia Gorge preservation
- Opponents: Timber interests; land developers
- Spouse: Bruce H. Russell
- Children: 5

Nancy Neighbor Russell (1932–2008) was an American conservationist. She was a co-founder of Friends of the Columbia Gorge, a leading conservationist, a negotiator, and a fundraiser.

== Early life and education ==
The daughter of Robert W. and Mary Ann Bishop Neighbor, Nancy Neighbor was born on January 11, 1932, in Portland, Oregon. She attended Miss Catlin's School and graduated from Scripps College in Claremont, California in 1953. She was an amateur tennis champion. She married Bruce H. Russell in 1957, and they had five children.

== Columbia River Gorge National Scenic Area ==
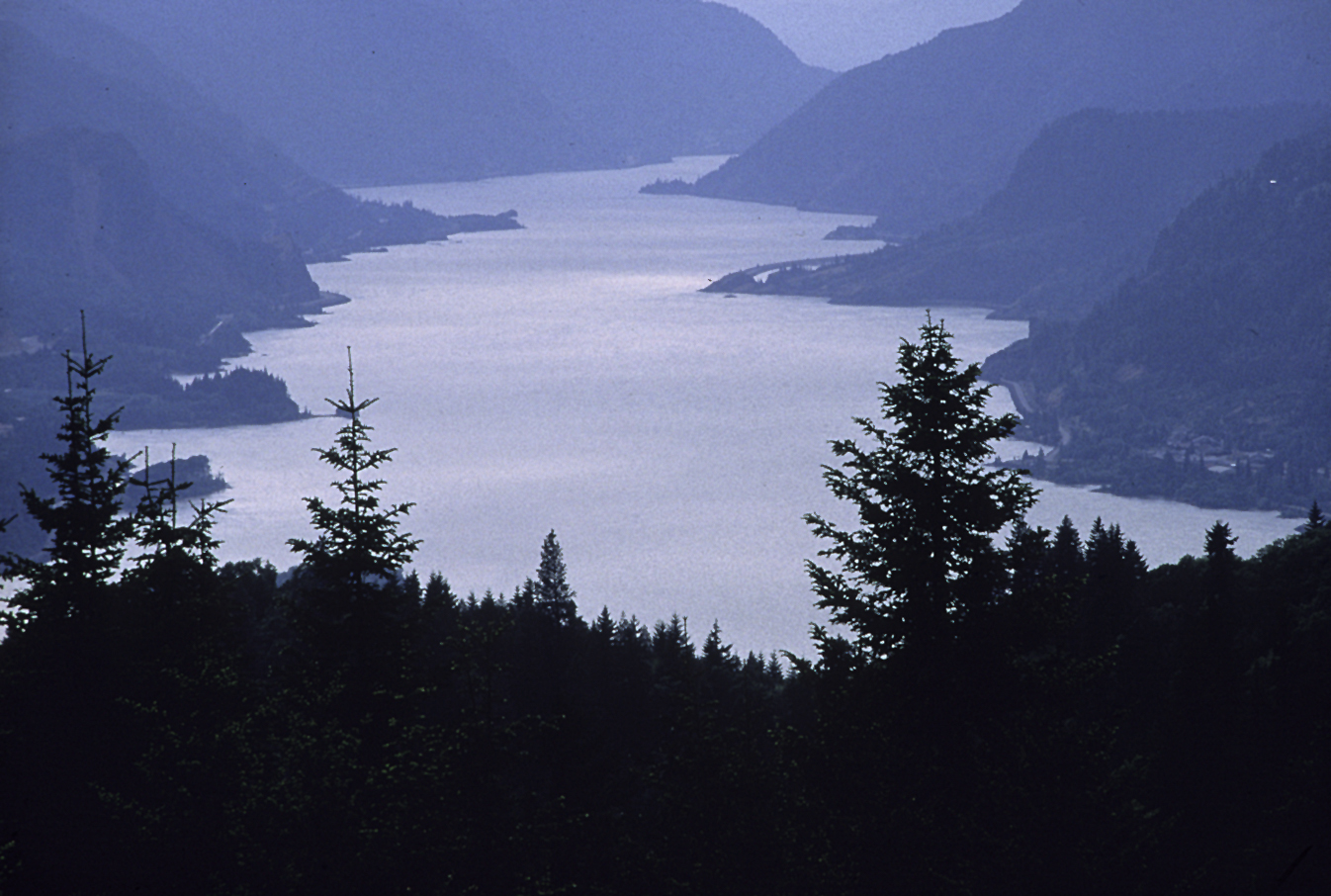
Columbia River Gorge from Benson Plateau

Russell was one of the principal figures responsible for passage of federal legislation protecting the Columbia River Gorge as a National Scenic Area in 1986. She was "a backpacking and wildflower enthusiast who loved the Columbia Gorge and other Northwest landscapes," and in 1979, architect John Yeon sought her help to protect the Gorge.

In November 1980, Nancy Russell was one of four people named at a Portland Garden Club meeting to build an organization establishing the Columbia River Gorge as a national scenic area. According to The Trust for Public Land, "the gorge was at risk of being transformed by development from fast-growing Portland and nearby Vancouver, Washington". By the following Spring, 31 members of "Friends of the Columbia Gorge" had begun to lobby local and national decision-makers to protect the Gorge.

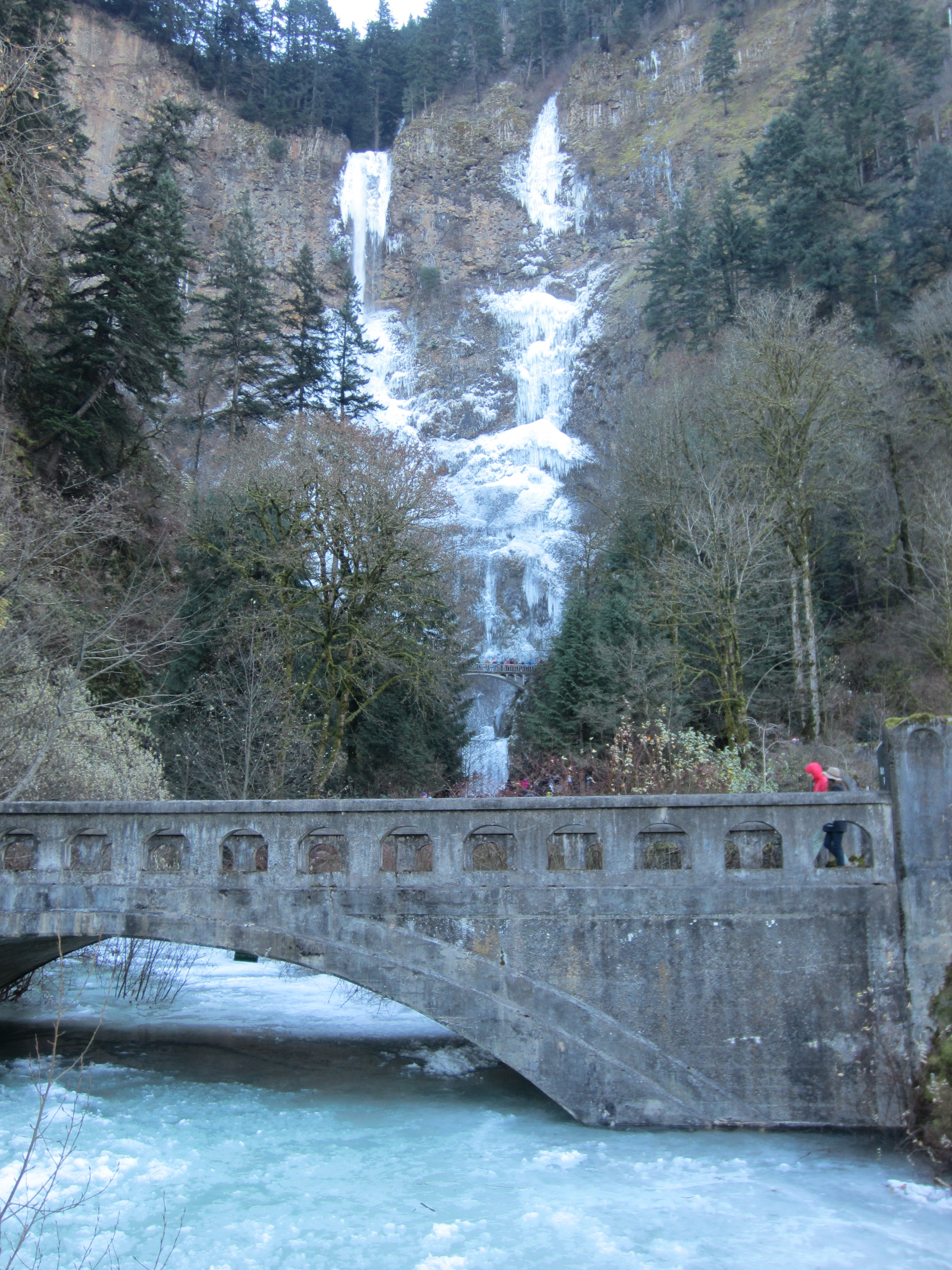
Multnomah Falls

According to The Oregonian, Russell was then on "the front lines in one of the Northwest's most hostile, divisive and long-running land-use wars". She spent "years lecturing, lobbying, testifying, fundraising and going toe to toe with a powerful foe, the timber industry". With the 1982 completion of the Interstate 205 bridge connecting Portland and Vancouver, she opposed impending industrial sprawl and subdivisions platted on scenic bluffs, as well as a planned marina and a factory. The Oregonian reported, "Many who lived or worked in the gorge vilified her. They considered Russell a bullheaded outsider trying to change their way of life. Pickups sported bumper stickers that read 'Save the gorge from Nancy Russell.' "

"She has peers... They're people like John Muir."

— Jim Desmond

Russell also invested in properties in the Gorge: "...she bought 33 parcels totaling 600 acres, always aiming to get her hands on land with great views, or that could be seen prominently from the gorge." Additionally, she and her husband gave a $300,000 no-interest loan to the Trust for Public Land, which the trust used to buy lots in a planned subdivision, in order to stop development on top of Cape Horn.

Russell asked Senator Mark Hatfield for help. He said he would advocate for special federal status if they organized people "from both sides of the river and both ends of the gorge" to support his stance.

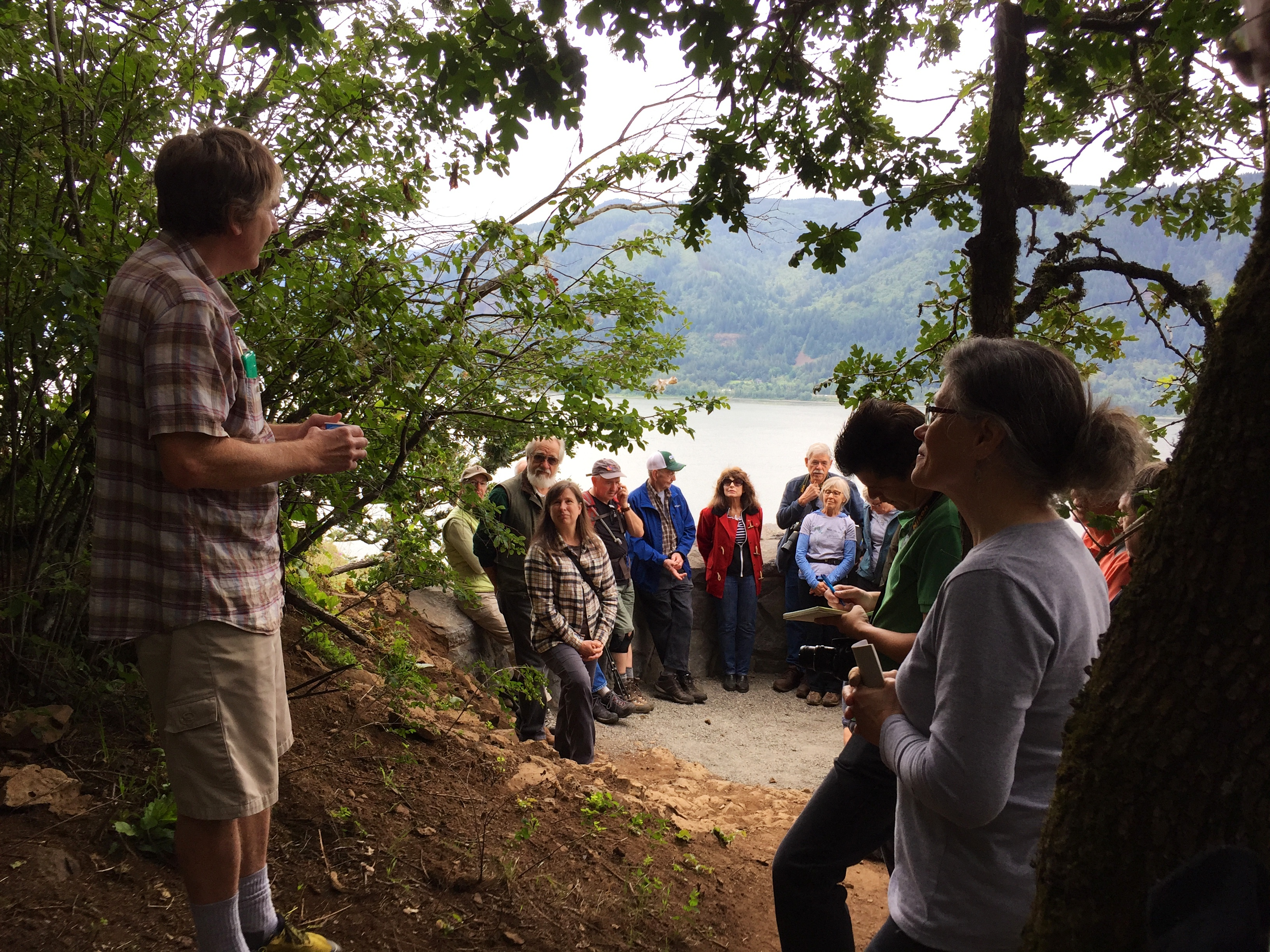
Cape Horn dedication to Nancy Russell.

In November 1986, President Ronald Reagan signed the Columbia River Gorge National Scenic Area Act.

Russell died of amyotrophic lateral sclerosis in September 2008.

An overlook named in her honor at Cape Horn has Columbia River and Multnomah Falls vistas: to the east, to Mist Falls, and down to Phoca Rock. On the Washington side of the river are the Prindle Cliffs, Beacon Rock, and the south face of Hamilton Mountain.
