= Ernest Jaqua =

First president of Scripps College

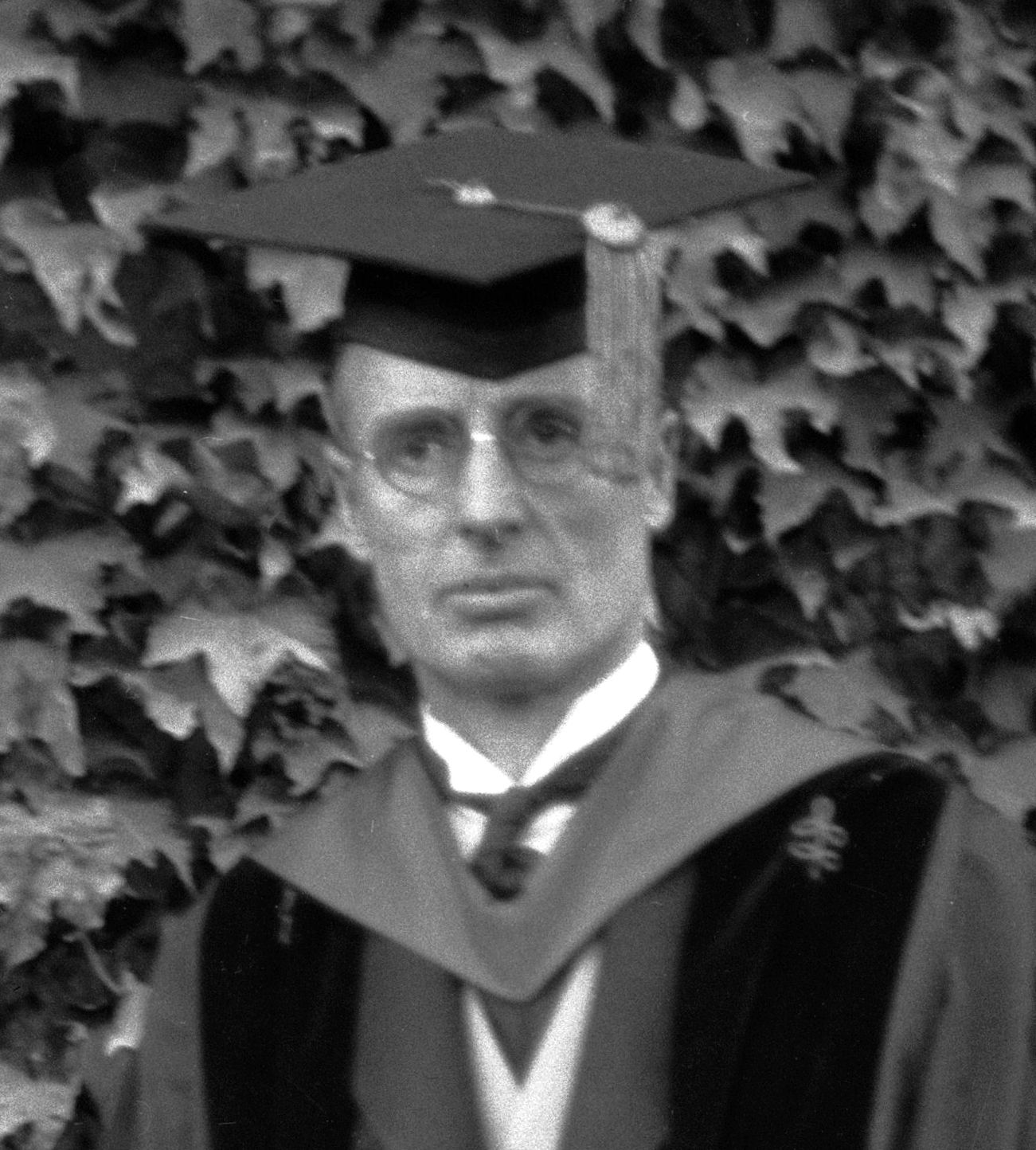
Jaqua in 1927

Ernest James Jaqua (October 24, 1882 – July 27, 1972) was an American academic who was the first president of Scripps College from 1926 to 1942. He earned degrees from Grinnell College (BA), Columbia University (MA), Union Theological Seminary (ThD), and Harvard University (PHD).
