= State House News Service =

Massachusetts news wire service

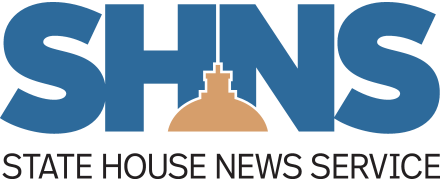

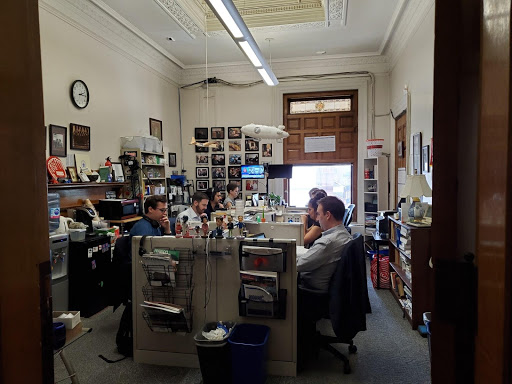
- SHNS newsroom in State House Room 458 (2019)
- Type: Private
- Industry: News agency
- Founded: 1894; 132 years ago in Boston, Massachusetts
- Founder: Charles E. Mann
- Headquarters: Massachusetts State House
- Key people: Craig R. Sandler (Manager), Michael P. Norton (Editor)
- Website: http://statehousenews.com

The State House News Service is an independent, privately owned news wire service that has been providing in-depth coverage of Massachusetts state government since 1894. It provides a continuous daily feed of news stories about state-government issues and events, supplemented by photos, audio and video. It is also the only news outlet with floor privileges in the Massachusetts House and Senate chambers, where SHNS reporters cover every session from desks near the rostrums.

The SHNS is a subscription-only, paywalled service with limited advertising. Clients include media outlets, government agencies, lobbyists and lobbying firms, political campaigns, advocacy organizations and non-profits, and corporations. The Service produces news stories, daily schedules of state house events, gavel-to-gavel coverage of the House and Senate, and weekly summaries of the week's top stories and of the events and issues likely to be making news in the weeks ahead. Its office is in Room 458 of the Massachusetts State House.

== History ==
The SHNS was founded in 1894 by Charles E. Mann of Lynn, Massachusetts, a self-educated reporter who began covering the State House beat in 1889 for the Boston Advertiser and Boston Record. It was not unheard of for reporters to cover the beat for more than one paper, nor to form their own small news services. Then as now, Mann's bureau afforded out-of-town papers the opportunity to print firsthand accounts of legislative business and track issues of importance to their communities. Mann added papers and reporters over time, and also worked part-time for state government itself, as a clerk on a special commission redrafting the state's statutes. In 1903, he took a full-time job with the government, as clerk of the state Railroad Commission which later became the Massachusetts Department of Public Utilities, and turned the business over to Charles H. Copeland. Copeland's family made headlines in 1912 when his brother-in-law, famous novelist Jacques Futrelle died aboard the RMS Titanic. The Service has operated continuously since its founding, passing through a succession of six owners to the present day, with the basic product remaining constant: daily news copy covering state government affairs.

=== Early leadership ===
Copeland died in 1913 and his wife Elberta inherited the business. The Copelands had made news themselves, across the east coast, with their high-profile elopement in 1893.

As manager/owner, Elberta spent the first seven years of her career disenfranchised from the government she covered daily; women did not receive the right to vote in Massachusetts until 1920. But Elberta insisted on her rights, becoming the first woman allowed onto the floor of the Massachusetts House Chamber. At the time of her death in 1951, she was also the only woman life member of the Massachusetts State House Press Association.

In time, she took a more passive role in actual news coverage, hiring a succession of editors and at the end of her long career "she just sat in the corner, proud to own the News Service," her great-grandnephew recalled. Copeland received a formal expression of concern in 1943 from Gov. Leverett Saltonstall about a serious accident, the nature of which was not specified. In 1947, she formally turned over ownership of the New Service to Paul Ryan, her longtime reporter and editor. Ryan became a legend in the political and journalistic life of the State House, holding court at his corner desk as politicians and would-be influencers came and went to share news tips and gossip about the issues of the day. He served as editor from 1942 until 1947, and owner/editor until 1979 when ill health forced his retirement.

Under Ryan, the News Service continued its non-sensational approach to coverage, though the reporters it employed had their quirks. Veteran Boston political reporter Peter Lucas remembered that Ryan tended to hire "unemployed reporters who were down and out with temporary jobs" in addition to the regular line reporters.

Ryan was in competition with the New England News Service, a similar wire service with a stronger emphasis on feature stories, established in the late 1930s by Arthur Woodman. Woodman's daughter Helen worked for her father's service, beginning her career after graduating from the University of New Hampshire in 1964. In 1978, with his health declining, Ryan asked Woodman to take over the News Service and she accepted. But immediately upon assuming the editorship, Woodman faced a crisis.

=== Dual-employment controversy ===
It was common in the early years of the 20th century for reporters to work side jobs doing research and writing news releases for government agencies and legislative commissions, and News Service reporters did lots of this sort of work into well into the 1970s. The appearance of State House reporters on the payrolls of government organizations made headlines from time to time from mid-century onward, and in 1978, just as Ryan's health was seriously declining, rival wire-service Associated Press published a story revealing that Ryan himself held contracts to do government work.

Encouraged by the News Service's competitors to cancel their subscriptions, a number of subscribers did just that, and Woodman had to deal with a crisis of both finances and reputation. But throughout the 1980s, she and her staff slowly won the departed subscribers back, and she made sure the wall between the News Service and the state payroll stayed up for good. Former SHNS reporter Lisa Capone, in a memorial interview after Woodman's death, said her former boss "ushered us through the initiation of what journalism really was."

Woodman earned a legendary status at the State House in her own right, training generations of reporters who went on to top positions in journalism, government and public affairs in Massachusetts. "There was nothing Helen didn't know about in the Massachusetts governing process," according to a 2017 WBUR-FM remembrance of Woodman's life. "She spoke 'State House' fluently. News outlets, lobbyists and trade organizations relied on her reporters — the Kids — who would type their articles on carbon paper and stuff them into cubbyhole mailboxes for clients to use in their own publications."

=== Current ownership ===
By 1996, Woodman felt she had run the News Service long enough and wished to retire, but wanted to turn the business over to someone who would uphold its integrity and news ethos. She found that person in Craig Sandler, who'd worked for Woodman from 1988 to 1991. Sandler had gone on to work as state government reporter for the TAB Newspapers, a chain of free weeklies in the Metrowest suburbs of Boston. The TABs were known for an unusually high quality level of coverage for free shoppers, with robust arts coverage and elements like the presence of a full-time report reporter at the State House. The chain was founded and run by Russel Pergament and Stephen Cummings.

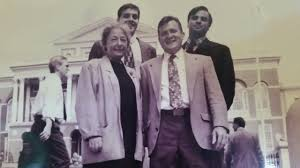
Helen Woodman with Craig Sandler on her left and SHNS reporters Jon Tapper and Dan Boylan in August 1996.

After the TAB, Sandler worked for The Sun of Lowell, and while he was there, Woodman told him of her interest in selling. Sandler reached out to Pergament and Cummings, and the trio acquired the News Service on Aug. 5, 1996. They have owned it ever since. Just as Elberta Copeland had selected Daniel O'Connor and others to serve as editor after doing the job for several years herself, in 1998, Sandler hired Michael P. Norton, who trained alongside Sandler under Helen Woodman, for the editor's job. Only Paul Ryan has held the editor's job longer.

=== Location, distribution, and technology ===
The News Service has always had offices on the fourth floor of the Massachusetts State House. The first location information, from 1906, puts the service in Room 449, farther toward the back of the building than the current room, 458. In 1947, when Thomas "Tip" O'Neill became the first Massachusetts House minority leader assigned an office, he took over 449, and the News Service was assigned Room 458, where it's been ever since.

In the beginning, copy was written out in longhand or typewritten, and early recollections of the service include reference to the mimeographing of copy - a cheap, fast, reliable method that was available from the founding of SHNS. The "flimsies," or copies, were picked up by hand by subscribers in the building, and also rushed by messenger boys down to the newsrooms on Newspaper Row in Boston - near modern-day Downtown Crossing. The mimeograph remained in use until the end of 1993. Paper copies were placed in boxes at the front of Room 458 from the time it moved well into the era of email. The full spectrum of players in state government would visit Room 458, to pick up the latest news and press releases.

By 1997, it was clear the service needed a digital presence, and its new owners established the email servers, Web site and back-end content preparation system necessary to get the copy out to subscribers over the Internet. The coming of digital also made possible the transmission of photos for the first time in service history, and they became a standard feature at the end of the '90s. Audio and video followed.

The digital archives of the service run back to 1986, and paper archives run back to the 1970s.

=== Reach and impact ===
Pergament and Cummings were experienced salespeople, and they expanded the subscriber base considerably. At the same time, the Internet was proving a bane to traditional journalism, but a boon to the News Service. The business model of ad-based news outlets deteriorated alarmingly after 1999, with advertisers preferring the customizable intimacy and market intelligence available on platforms like Facebook and Google, and that led to staffing reductions industry-wide that have continued to this day. State House bureaus were downsized, then eliminated, by most Massachusetts regional newspapers. Consolidation of newspaper holding groups became the norm, followed by acquisition of these groups by finance-focused hedge and venture funds who prime focus was on the robustness of investor return more than the vitality of civic life or ensuring a well-informed citizenry.

Denuded of government reporters, the news outlets increasingly relied on News Service copy for State House coverage that once had been provided by staff members. "The State House News Service is one news operation that has benefited from news cutbacks," according to a 2011 CommonWealth Magazine story. "It used to be a backstop for most news organizations, essentially a transcription service keeping track of hearings, press conferences, and legislative sessions. But as the reporting ranks dwindled on Beacon Hill, the News Service has become a major supplier of State House stories to newspapers and media outlets across the state." SHNS articles, photos, and audio-visual content are utilized by both daily newspapers and all major broadcast stations in Boston. While hard statistics are difficult to gather authoritatively, it is likely that more people read News Service copy today statewide than at any time in the Service's 125-plus years of existence.

=== News Service Florida ===
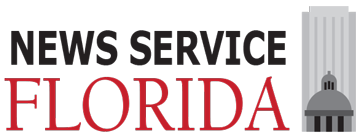

By the mid-2000s, the new digital paywall model for the News Service had been validated, and Sandler began visiting other state capitols to see if the model could be replicated. Florida had the lucrative market, thriving government-affairs sector and complicated politics that would support a large enough staff and infrastructure to run a full-fledged capitol bureau, so Sandler selected Tallahassee. The business model, operating structure, product offering and customer base are very similar to those of the State House News Service.

== Role in the Massachusetts State House ==
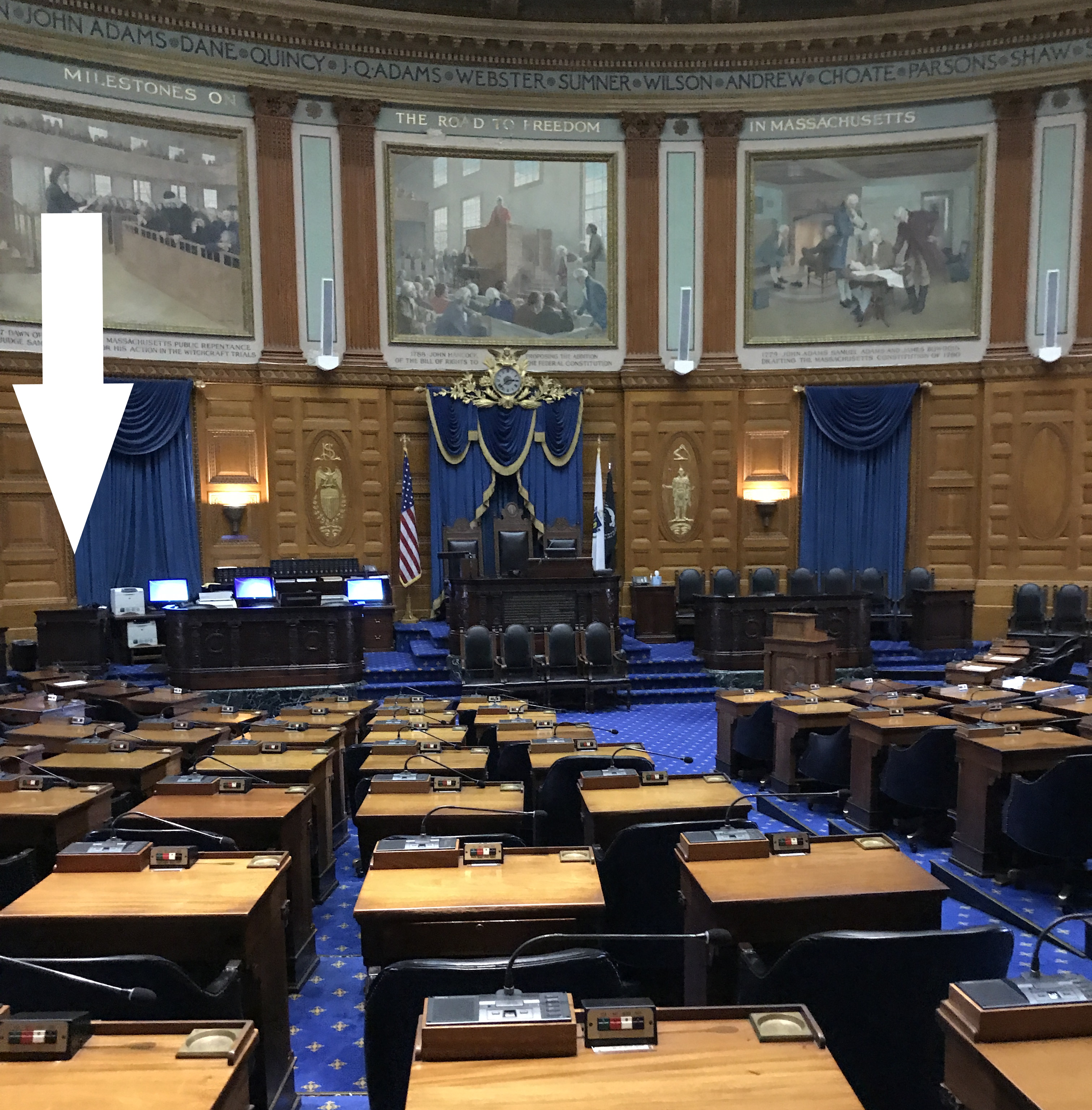
Location of the State House News Service reporter's desk on the floor of the House Chamber

The News Service serves most immediately as a "cheat sheet" for reporters assigned to the State House itself, to fill them in on stories they can't cover directly because they are working on other stories or assignments. This "cheat sheet" function has diminished in importance as the number of State House reporters, and the ranks of journalists assigned to cover government, has diminished significantly in recent years. At the same time, this phenomenon has increased the value of the Service in newsrooms across Massachusetts (and Florida, in the case of NSF). News organizations use SHNS stories in place of pieces that once would have been written by State House reporters (Capitol reporters in Florida). The News Service operates as a wire service of record for the building as the only outlet granted floor privileges in the House and Senate chambers, in contrast to other news organizations that report from the galleries. The SHNS floor desks are located near the rostrums of both chambers. In 1970, a short item in the Boston Herald described SHNS reporter Fred Day being "hit by flying pieces of a gavel thumped vigorously by House Speaker Bartley, whose stand is fully 10 feet away"—for the second time in 10 days.

Beyond the journalism community, the News Service serves as a de facto news source of record for the wider state-government community - the legislators, legislative staffers, agency employees, political organizations and industry groups, and the like.

== Editors ==
- Howard W. Kendall, 1914–1918
- Grover C. Hoyt, 1919–1920
- Daniel J. O'Connor, 1921–1942
- Paul C. Ryan, 1942–1979
- Helen Woodman, 1979–1996
- Craig Sandler, 1996–1998
- Michael P. Norton, 1998–present

== Notable alumni ==
- Kyle Cheney: Congressional reporter for Politico and political analyst on CNN and MSNBC.
- James S. Doyle: Boston Globe Washington bureau chief, contributed to the Globe's 1966 Pulitzer Prize–winning coverage of Francis X. Morrissey's judicial nomination, 1965 Nieman Fellow.
- Father John L. Doyle: Catholic priest, international missionary, advocate for immigrants and the poor. Started with SHNS as a copy boy before attending seminary.
- James Vincent Faraci: A messenger for the News Service in the 1930s, running sheets of news copy from the Copeland News Service to Newspaper Row on Tremont St., Faraci left when he was just 16 to become a jazz drummer, and made it big as "Jimmy Vincent" under bandleader Louis Prima; one of his best known pieces of work is "I Wan'na Be Like You," recorded by Prima's band for the original Jungle Book film soundtrack.
- James T. Harris: Tapped by Gov. Samuel W. McCall to serve on a special commission in 1916 to travel to the Mexican border to receive votes of Massachusetts troops on Election Day.
- Robert Healy: Boston Globe State House Bureau Chief and editor.
- Stephen Kurkjian: Three-time Pulitzer Prize winner for The Boston Globe who helped lead its coverage of the Catholic clergy sex-abuse coverup. He worked for the News Service while attending Boston University and Suffolk Law School in the late 60's and early 70's.
- Michael Levenson: New York Times general assignment reporter.
- Louis Mathieu: After reporting for SHNS, Mathieu embarked on a 35-year career in a communications role for what became the Massachusetts Bay Transportation Authority, starting as publicity and traffic promotion assistant at the Boston Elevated Railway and continuing to serve through the system's iterations as the Metropolitan Transit Authority and MBTA.
- James McGarry: A rookie reporter with Kurkjian who shipped off to Vietnam soon after working at the News Service and was killed in 1969 after just a week overseas.
- Loretta McLaughlin: Editorial Page Editor of The Boston Globe in the early 1990s, she was married to News Service reporter Jim McLaughlin, befriended Ryan, and may well have done some pieces for him as she broke into the male-dominated journalism profession.
- Tom O'Connor: While an SHNS reporter, O'Connor became fascinated by the Sacco and Vanzetti case, and spent the next 40 years investigating the story of the two Italian immigrants and their alleged crimes. His research papers are now held by the Brandeis University Archives and Special Collections Department.
- Elliot Paul: The author of 33 novels from 1925 through 1953, notably The Last Time I Saw Paris, Paul worked for the News Service during its days as Copeland News Service from 1914 to 1921, interrupted by his service in World War I in 1917–1918.
- Cyndi Roy: Spokeswoman for the Massachusetts Democratic Party and Communications Director for Gov. Deval Patrick and Attorney General Maura Healey.
- Lawrence E. "Babe" Ryan: The brother of SHNS editor-publisher Paul Ryan, Lawrence reported for the News Service prior to his appointment as an assistant attorney general by Attorney General Francis E. Kelly.
