= Biman Bagchi =

Indian chemist (born 1954)

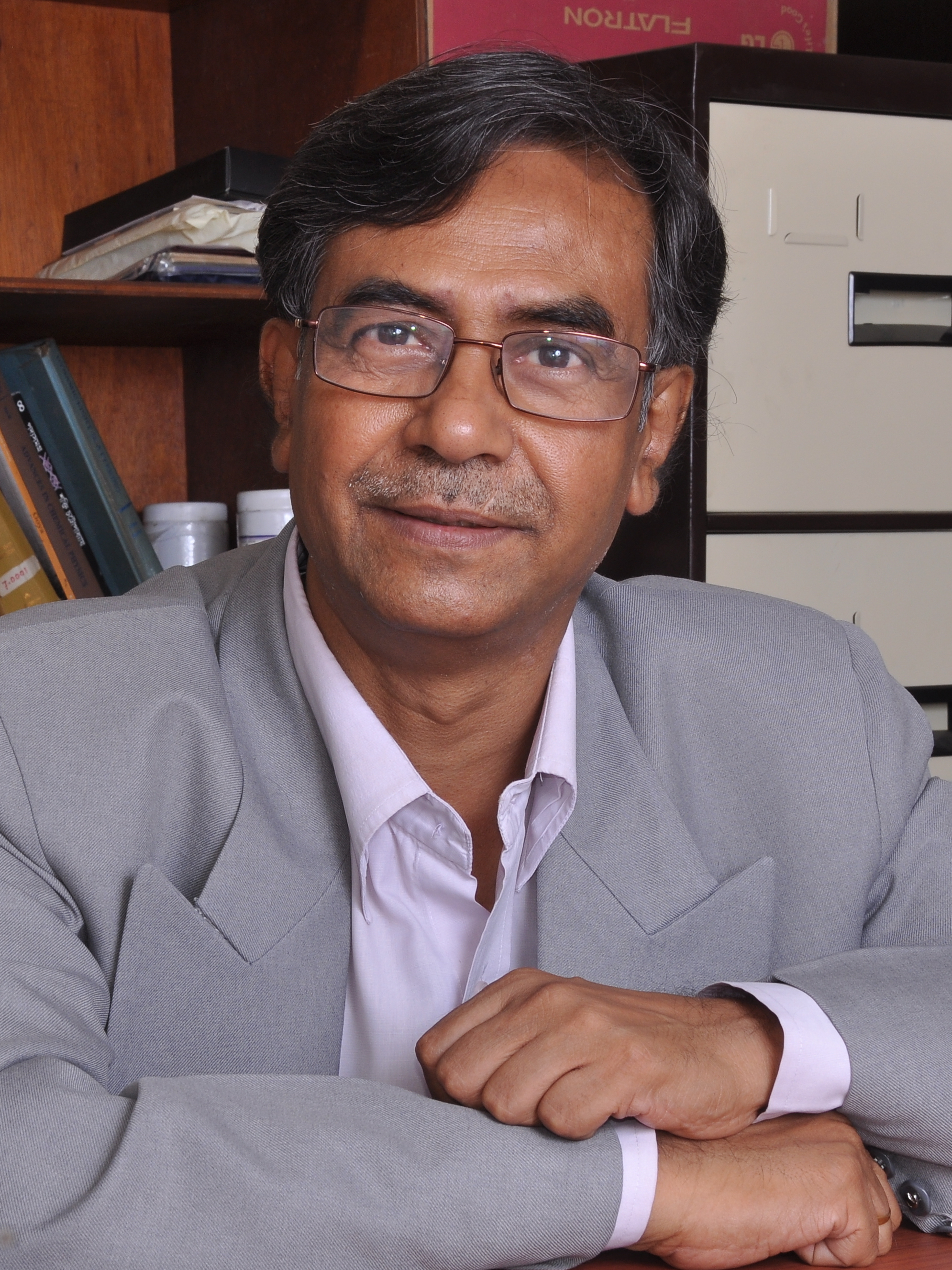
- Born: 1 January 1954 (age 72); Kolkata, West Bengal, India
- Education: University of Calcutta; Brown University; University of Maryland
- Awards: Alexander von Humboldt Science Research Award; Elected Foreign Member of the American Academy of Arts and Sciences (AAAS); Joel Henry Hildebrand Award (ACS); Shanti Swarup Bhatnagar Prize for Science and Technology
- Scientific career
- Fields: Biophysical Chemistry; Theoretical Chemistry; Statistical Mechanics
- Workplaces: Indian Institute of Science, Bangalore
- Doctoral advisor: Julian Gibbs
- Website: Group website

Biman Bagchi is an Indian scientist currently serving as a SERB-DST National Science Chair Professor and Honorary Professor at the Solid State and Structural Chemistry Unit of the Indian Institute of Science. He is a theoretical physical chemist and biophysicist known for his research in the area of statistical mechanics; particularly in the study of phase transition and nucleation, solvation dynamics, mode-coupling theory of electrolyte transport, dynamics of biological macromolecules (proteins, DNA etc.), protein folding, enzyme kinetics, supercooled liquids and protein hydration layer. He is an elected fellow of the Indian National Science Academy, the Indian Academy of Sciences, The World Academy of Sciences and an International honorary member of the American Academy of Arts and Sciences. Along with several scientific articles, he has authored three books, (i) Molecular Relaxation in Liquids, (ii) Water in Biological and Chemical Processes: From Structure and Dynamics to Function, and (iii) Statistical Mechanics for Chemistry and Materials Science.

== Biography ==
Bagchi was born in 1954 to Binay K. Bagchi, a school principal and his homemaker/part-time teacher wife, Abha, in Kolkata in the Indian state of West Bengal. He graduated in chemistry from Presidency College, Kolkata (present-day Presidency University) in 1974 and obtained a master's degree from Rajabazar Science College, Calcutta University in 1976. He earned a PhD at Brown University in 1980, working with Julian Gibbs and did his post-doctoral studies at James Franck Institute of the University of Chicago as a research associate. There he worked with renowned chemists such as David W. Oxtoby, Graham Fleming and Stuart Rice till 1983 when he shifted to the laboratory of Robert Zwanzig of the University of Maryland for a one-year stint. Bagchi returned to India in 1984 and joined Indian Institute of Science (IISc) at their Solid State and Structural Chemistry Unit as a lecturer and established his research group.

== Research ==
In an academic career spanning over more than three decades in which Bagchi has travelled over a wide landscape of physical chemistry, chemical physics, and biophysical chemistry where his contributions often helped build up an area from its foundations. This was done by maintaining a close collaboration with experimental research groups both in India and abroad. He often developed theories that combined sophisticated theoretical approaches (such as mode coupling theory) to extend traditional and established theories and methods (like Kramers' theory of barrier crossing dynamics, FRET, and electrochemistry) to explain emerging experimental and simulation results.

Professor Bagchi has published more than 480 articles and received more than 24000 citations. His work has been published in reputed journals such as Nature, PNAS, PRL, JACS, JPC and Chemical Reviews. He has also authored two well-known monographs published by the Oxford University Press (NY) [Molecular Relaxation in Liquids] and Cambridge University Press (UK) [Water in Biological and Chemical Processes: From Structure and Dynamics to Function]. And a third major text on Statistical Mechanics published by Francis-Taylor & CRC Press. Bagchi has conducted lectures at national and international levels. (Note: Please see Lectures section) He is also associated with a number of science journals as a member of their editorial boards. He has authored 22 major review articles that are partly pedagogical and influenced generations of physical and theoretical chemists.

Some representative examples of his seminal contributions are discussed below:

(i) In the 1970s and 1980s, it was realized that a large number of ultrafast processes could show the usual dynamical characteristics of an activated reaction but occur in the absence of any activation barrier to their reactive motion. Prof. Bagchi developed the first and till to date the most successful theory of barrierless chemical reactions. This theory explained how we can speak of a reaction rate even in the absence of a barrier.

(ii) Solvation dynamics of polar solutes in dipolar liquids (like water, ethanol) was a topic of huge contemporary interest from mid-eighties to late nineties. A continuum model of the solvent with a frequency dependent dielectric function was developed by Bagchi that predicted a relaxation time, later called the longitudinal relaxation time, which was faster than the dielectric relaxation time of the solvent, thus providing a first-time explanation of the experimentally observed fast relaxation of the time dependent solvation energy. However, the continuum model could not explain the ultrafast sub-100 fs solvation observed by Fleming et al. Bagchi explained this by developing a microscopic theory which included intermolecular correlations and also the contribution of translational contributions of solvent molecules.

(iii) The dielectric relaxation theories prior to mid-eighties considered primarily rotational modes. Bagchi and co-workers came up with a microscopic theory of frequency and wave vector dependent dielectric function which included both rotational and translational degrees of freedom. Translational modes were shown to play a hidden role in dielectric relaxation. Due to the presence of orientational correlations, the longitudinal and transverse dielectric functions exhibit vastly different relaxation times at finite wave vectors. This was indeed an important result because, in many dynamical processes, it is the finite wave vector response of the solvent that matters the most. A self-consistent theory was developed for the dielectric friction and dielectric relaxation. It was shown that the presence of translational contributions can make dielectric relaxation more Debye-like for cases where only rotational contributions give rise to a highly non-Debye form of dielectric relaxation.

== Awards and honors ==
The Indian National Science Academy awarded Bagchi the INSA Medal for Young Scientists in 1986; the Academy would honor him again in 1990 with A. K. Bose Memorial Medal and with an elected fellowship in 1995. He received the Homi Bhabha fellowship in 1989 before the Council of Scientific and Industrial Research awarded him the Shanti Swarup Bhatnagar Prize, one of the highest Indian science awards, in 1991. The same year, the Indian Academy of Sciences elected him as their fellow and he became an elected fellow of The World Academy of Sciences in 2004. In between, he received the G. D. Birla Award in 1997, TWAS Prize in 1998, the Alumni Excellence Award in Research of the Indian Institute of Science in 2002 and Goyal Prize in Chemistry in 2003. He was selected as J. C. Bose National Fellow in 2006 and the several award orations he has delivered include B. C. Laha Memorial Lecture of 2001, conducted by Indian Association for the Cultivation of Science and Mizushima-Raman Lecture of 2006, jointly organized by the Department of Science and Technology and Japan Society for the Promotion of Science. The Journal of Physical Chemistry published a festschrift on Bagchi by way of their August 2015 issue. He has been selected as the 2021 recipient of the Joel Henry Hildebrand Award in the Theoretical and Experimental Chemistry of Liquids, by the American Chemical Society (ACS). He was also selected for the prestigious Alexander von Humboldt Foundation's Humboldt Science Research Award (2019) in recognition of his work in chemical sciences. In 2021, Biman Bagchi was a laureate of the Asian Scientist 100 by the Asian Scientist.

== Selected bibliography ==
=== Books ===
- Biman Bagchi (17 April 2012). Molecular Relaxation in Liquids. Oxford University Press, USA. ISBN 978-0-19-986332-7.
- Biman Bagchi (14 November 2013). Water in Biological and Chemical Processes: From Structure and Dynamics to Function. Cambridge University Press. ISBN 978-1-107-03729-8.
- Biman Bagchi (17 July 2018). Statistical Mechanics for Chemistry and Materials Science. CRC Press. ISBN 978-1-4822-9986-1.

=== Chapters ===
- Arnab Mukherji; Richard Lavery; Biman Bagchi; James T Hynes (2009). "Simulation Study of the Molecular Mechanism of Intercalation of the Anti-cancer Drug Daugnomycin into DNA". In Irene Burghardt; V. May; David A. Micha; E. R. Bittner (eds.). Energy Transfer Dynamics in Biomaterial Systems. Springer. p. 165. ISBN 978-3-642-02306-4.
- Dwaipayan Chakarabarti, Biman Bagchi (2009). "Dynamics of Thermotropic Liquid Crystals". In Stuart A. Rice (ed.). Advances in Chemical Physics. John Wiley & Sons. p. 266. ISBN 978-0-470-43190-0.
- Biman Bagchi (2012). "Dynamics in the Crossover Region of Supercooled Liquids". In Peter G. Wolynes; Vassiliy Lubchenko (eds.). Structural Glasses and Supercooled Liquids: Theory, Experiment, and Applications. John Wiley & Sons. p. 279. ISBN 978-0-470-45223-3.
- Rakesh S Singh; Mantu Santra; Biman Bagchi (2016). "Theoretical Studies of Nucleation and Growth". In Swapan Kumar Ghosh; Pratim Kumar Chattaraj (eds.). Concepts and Methods in Modern Theoretical Chemistry: Statistical Mechanics. CRC Press. p. 1. ISBN 978-1-4665-0621-3.
