= Jonathan Fanton =

American academic and nonprofit executive (born 1943)

Jonathan F. Fanton

46th President of American Academy of Arts and Sciences
- In office 2014–2018
- Preceded by: Leslie Cohen Berlowitz
- Succeeded by: David W. Oxtoby

3rd President of John D. and Catherine T. MacArthur Foundation
- In office 1999–2009
- Preceded by: Adele Simmons
- Succeeded by: Robert L. Gallucci

6th President of The New School for Social Research
- In office 1982–1999
- Preceded by: John R. Everett
- Succeeded by: Bob Kerrey

Personal details
- Born: 1943 (age 82–83)
- Education: Yale University (BA, PhD)

Jonathan F. Fanton (born 1943) is an American academic and nonprofit executive. He served as the president of the American Academy of Arts and Sciences from 2014 to 2018, the president of the John D. and Catherine T. MacArthur Foundation from 1999 to 2009, and as the president of The New School for Social Research from 1982 to 1999. He has served as board chair for several organizations, including Human Rights Watch, the Security Council Report, and the New York State Commission on Independent Colleges and Universities. He also serves on the boards of Scholars At Risk, the International Integrity Initiative, American University Afghanistan, American Exchange Project, and the European Humanities University. He also serves as a member of the advisory board of the Yale Jackson School of Global Affairs. He is a life trustee of Human Rights Watch and The Asian Cultural Council. He was elected a fellow of the American Academy of Arts and Sciences and the American Philosophical Society.

== Early life and career ==
Born in Mobile, Alabama, Fanton grew up in Trumbull and Weston, Connecticut. In 1961, he graduated from Choate School. At Yale University, he earned a bachelor's degree in 1965, and a Ph.D. in American history in 1978. As an undergraduate, Fanton directed the Ulysses S. Grant Program, a summer enrichment program for talented students from the inner city. He went on to serve at Yale as associate provost and as special assistant to President Kingman Brewster. He subsequently served as vice president for planning at the University of Chicago.

== Academic and nonprofit leadership ==
In 1982, Fanton was inaugurated president of The New School for Social Research in New York City, a leadership position that he held for 17 years. One of his signature accomplishments as president was the reconnection of The New School to its European roots through assistance provided to dissident scholars in Eastern and Central Europe, many of whom were leaders of human rights organizations in their home countries. After becoming president of the MacArthur Foundation in 1999, he worked to strengthen the organization’s commitment to a variety of issues, including international justice, human rights, peace and security, biodiversity conservation, and community and economic development. From 2009 to 2014, Fanton was interim director of the Roosevelt House Public Policy Institute at Hunter College. From 2014 to 2019, he served as the president of the American Academy of Arts and Sciences, one of the oldest learned societies and independent policy research centers in the United States. He was elected to the American Philosophical Society in 2015.

== Scholarship ==
Fanton is the author of Foundations and Civil Society, Volumes I and II (MacArthur Foundation, 2008) and The University and Civil Society, Volumes I and II (New School for Social Research, 1995, 2002). He is also co-editor of John Brown: Great Lives Observed (Prentice-Hall, 1973) and The Manhattan Project: A Documentary Introduction to the Atomic Age (McGraw-Hill, 1991).
