= The Real Paper =

Boston-area alternative weekly newspaper

- Type: Alternative weekly
- Founded: August 2, 1972; 54 years ago
- Ceased publication: June 18, 1981; 45 years ago
- Political alignment: English
- City: Cambridge, Massachusetts
- Country: United States

The Real Paper was a Boston-area alternative weekly newspaper with a circulation in the tens of thousands. It ran from August 2, 1972, to June 18, 1981, often devoting space to counterculture and alternative politics of the early 1970s. The offices were in Cambridge, Massachusetts.

== History ==
The Cambridge Phoenix was born on October 9, 1969, founded by Jeffrey Tarter. In the summer of 1972, Richard Missner, owner of what was then simply called "The Phoenix," fired editor Harper Barnes in a journalistic dispute. A union was formed and almost all of the staff went on strike. An agreement was reached within two weeks, without Barnes' reinstatement. Soon afterwards, the staff was informed of the purchase of the paper – its name and goodwill – by Stephen Mindich, owner of the more established (and more commercial) competitor Boston After Dark. Hoping to eliminate his direct competition. Mindich renamed his paper The Boston Phoenix After Dark, later shortened back to The Boston Phoenix. The entire former staff of The Phoenix was now unemployed, the lone exception being the late sportswriter George Kimball, who went to work for Mindich. Because of the solidarity developed before and during the strike, the Cambridge group decided to continue publication as The Real Paper (by implication, "The Real Phoenix") and organized themselves as an employee-run cooperative. Bob L. Oliver, The Real Papers founding art director, was responsible for editorial and advertising graphic design from July 1972 to July 1973 and designed the paper's logo based on the original Phoenix type style. The Real Paper staff elected Robert Rotner as publisher, the late Jeff Albertson (a well-known staff photographer) as associate publisher, reporter Paul Solman as editor and Robert Williams as advertising director. The editorial staff included women's columnist Laura Shapiro, former editor Harper Barnes, rock critics Jon Landau and James Isaacs, reporters Charlie McCollum and Chuck Fager, cartoonist David Omar White, and writers Stephen Davis, C. Wendell Smith and Jon Lipsky. David Chandler was the first design director, succeeded by Ronn Campisi and later Lynn Staley, who later became the head of design at The Boston Globe and Newsweek and Lucy Bartholomay, who succeeded Staley at "The Globe." Photo editor Peter Southwick also went on to "The Globe" as photo editor and now directs the Boston University College of Communication photojournalism program. Paula Childs, the listings editor, became a television reporter.

Though no capital was ever invested, The Real Paper cooperative became self-sustaining within several months. Two years of growth followed, accompanied by some employee turnover. Notable hires included reporters Joe Klein, Bo Burlingham, Anita Harris, Burt Solomon and Ed Zuckerman, the late movie critic Stuart Byron, and columnists Kay Larson, aka Nora Lasky (art), and Mark Zanger (food, as "The Red Chef"), and music writers James Miller and Dave Marsh. As freelancers, the noted civil rights attorney Harvey A. Silverglate wrote on legal matters; Lita Lepie, author of the murder mystery Black Lotus, wrote one of the country's first Lesbian columns under the pseudonym Lilith Moon; movie critic Lisa Schwarzbaum wrote about classical music, among other subjects; Fred Hapgood covered science.

Eventually, however, the strains of operating as a worker-owned firm without having learned how to handle cooperative management led to staff divisions. Published accounts of the split include one in the Harvard Crimson. Another appeared in a 1983 book, Life and Death on the Corporate Battlefield, by former editor Solman and former Managing Editor Thomas Friedman.

Le Anne Schreiber, writing in The New York Times (January 3, 1983) discussed and quoted from the book's chapter on the paper's early history;

Lessons emerge from case histories of actual companies and individuals. Although it is told without hand-wringing, the saddest of these stories is what happened to the staff of The Real Paper ... Lines were drawn, and suddenly everybody was a close friend of somebody who was now the enemy of another close friend.

In a traditional organization, the conflicts that arose would have been solved by firings or resignations; but at The Real Paper, which had been set up as an egalitarian business – with every employee holding an equal number of shares as long as he or she worked for the paper – there was no way to settle or to escape internal conflict. The fact that the paper had become profitable meant that no one wanted to leave and relinquish shares; but by staying together, given the bitter factionalism that had developed, the staff insured that the paper would become progressively less profitable.

== Journalists, authors and others ==
Ad from The Real Paper for Orson Welles Cinema (June 13, 1973)

The Real Paper served as a springboard for many prominent journalists, authors and members of the music industry. Jon Landau became the music editor of Rolling Stone. He is the author of "It's Too Late to Stop Now: a Rock and Roll Journal" and longtime manager of Bruce Springsteen. Stephen Davis has written biographies of Led Zeppelin, The Rolling Stones, Fleetwood Mac, Aerosmith, Guns N' Roses, Carly Simon, Bob Marley, Levon Helm, and Jim Morrison, among others. Dave Marsh is the author of numerous books on rock, including Elvis, Louie Louie and Before I Get Old: the Story of the Who. James Miller, a longtime professor at The New School, was the original editor of The Rolling Stone Illustrated History of Rock and Roll and subsequently wrote Flowers in the Dustbin: The Rise of Rock and Roll, 1947–1977, The Passion of Michel Foucault, and Examined Lives: From Socrates to Nietzsche. In 1982, James Isaacs began what would become a 27-year radio career at the Boston NPR affiliate, WBUR-FM, where he at various times hosted jazz, pop, and soul music programs, as well as contributing to the station's news programs. In 1986, he was nominated for a Grammy for co-producing, with fellow Real Paper alumnus Joe McEwen, a Frank Sinatra multi-disk boxed set. Like McEwen, Russell Gersten covered blues and soul music for the paper. Rory O'Connor, a freelance writer for the original cooperative version of the paper later became its managing editor. O'Connor is now a journalist, educator and documentary filmmaker who, with Real Paper contributor Danny Schechter (1942–2015), has for decades run the award-winning production company Globalvision and has written several books, including, most recently, Nukespeak, Shock Jocks, and Friends, Followers and the Future: How Social Media are Changing Politics, Threatening Big Brands, and Killing Traditional Media. David Ansen become the film critic for Newsweek. Paul Solman became an economics correspondent for the PBS NewsHour. Kay Larson moved to New York in 1975, wrote a weekly art column for the Village Voice, and from 1980 to 1994 was art critic and a contributing editor of New York Magazine. She was a contributor to The New York Times from 1995 to 2007, and wrote a biography, Where the Heart Beats: John Cage, Zen Buddhism, and the Inner Life of Artists (2012), about Cage's influence on postmodern art. Theater critic Arthur Friedman moved on to the Boston Herald. (He died February 18, 2002.) Time columnist and TV commentator Joe Klein took a job with Rolling Stone in 1974 and later New York Magazine, Newsweek and The New Yorker. He is the author of Woody Guthrie: A Life, Payback, Primary Colors (as "Anonymous"), The Natural: The Misunderstood Presidency of Bill Clinton, Politics Lost: How American Democracy Was Trivialized By People Who Think You're Stupid, and The Running Mate. Thomas Friedman became a PBS writer/producer/executive producer, working on PBS series as diverse as ENTERPRISE and The Science Odyssey, and author of books as varied as Up the Ladder, 1000 Unforgettable Senior Moments...Of Which We Could Only Remember 246 and The Senior Moments Memory Workout. Bo Burlingham has written several books on small business, including Small Giants and Finish Big. Burt Solomon wrote FDR v. the Constitution, Where They Ain't, and The Washington Century. Laura Shapiro, whose column on feminism ran weekly and was among the first in the nation to cover and analyze the burgeoning women's movement, went on to Newsweek, where she became a senior writer on food, the arts and women's issues. She is the author of three books on culinary history: Perfection Salad: Women and Cooking at the Turn of the Century (1984); Something from the Oven: Reinventing Dinner in 1950s America (2004) and Julia Child (2007). Jon Lipsky, who died in 2011, was a noted playwright (Coming Up for Air, Living in Exile, among others) who wrote the book Dreaming Together (2008) and taught theater arts at Boston University for 28 years. David Chandler wrote the book Life on Mars and was for many years a writer for the Boston Globe, as were the paper's television critic Ed Siegel and supplements editor Jan Freeman, who in 2009 wrote Ambrose Bierce's Write It Right: The Celebrated Cynic's Language Peeves Deciphered, Appraised, and Annotated for 21st-Century Readers. Listings editor Monica Collins became a television columnist at the Boston Herald and USA Today and now writes the online advice column "Ask Dog Lady." Craig Unger, responsible for the paper's Short Takes section, became a prominent magazine writer and editor, with several books of investigative journalism to his credit, including Boss Rove: Inside Karl Rove's Secret Kingdom of Power and The Fall of the House of Bush. After a stint at Rolling Stone, Ed Zuckerman became a TV writer and producer, long associated with the Law & Order series and more recently, Blue Bloods. Mark D. Devlin, who was first published in The Real Paper by editor Mark Zanger, later wrote the critically acclaimed memoir, Stubborn Child (Atheneum, 1985). Alan MacRobert covered science in the mid-late '70s. In 1982 he joined Sky and Telescope magazine and is now a senior editor. He also writes an astronomy column for The Boston Globe. In 2003 the asteroid 10373 MacRobert was named in his honor. Boston television sports reporter Clark Booth wrote a story about violence in pro football in 1975 for both Mother Jones magazine and The Real Paper that Joe Nocera reprinted in part in The New York Times in 2012. Booth still writes about sports for the Boston archdiocese's The Pilot.

== Film criticism ==
Film critics contributing to The Real Paper included Chuck Kraemer; Stuart Byron; the prominent left-wing journalist Andrew Kopkind, who died in 1994, Stephen Schiff, who covered films for The Real Paper and the Boston Phoenix before moving on to Vanity Fair and The New Yorker and then establishing a career as a screenwriter (Lolita, The Deep End of the Ocean, True Crime); Kathy Huffhines (later with the Detroit Free Press before she was killed in a parked car by a falling tree limb); Patrick McGilligan (who later wrote biographies of Alfred Hitchcock, Jack Nicholson and others); David Rosenbaum; Bhob Stewart (later film critic for Heavy Metal magazine); David Thomson; Michael Wilmington (later film critic for the Chicago Tribune); Gerald Peary, who had moved from New York City to Cambridge in 1978 and continued to review for The Real Paper until it folded in June, 1981.

== Business staff ==
On the business side of the paper, the first circulation director, Russel Pergament, later an ad salesman who also wrote occasionally, founded, with fellow Real Paper ad salesmen Steve Cummings and Richard Yousoufian, Tab Communications, which eventually published 14 regional weeklies in cities surrounding Boston. Comptroller Howard Garsh spent many years at Sail Magazine. Steve Crosby is Dean of the McCormack Graduate School at the University of Massachusetts, Boston and Chairman of the Massachusetts State Gaming Commission. Circulation Director, David Stein founded two commercial real estate trade publications purchased by Communications Channels, Inc., redeveloped historic mills, and is the managing partner of a marketing company representing states' DOTs. Advertising director Robert Williams became a serial media entrepreneur who founded National Cable Advertising, later NCC Media, now owned by Comcast, Time Warner and Cox. He then founded National Public Broadcasting (representing all the PBS and NPR stations in the US), now known as National Public Media.

== Early coverage of Bruce Springsteen ==
Jon Landau's prophetic 1974 article in The Real Paper in which he famously claimed that "I saw rock and roll future and its name is Bruce Springsteen" is credited by Nick Hornby and others with fostering the artist's popularity. Landau wrote:

But tonight there is someone I can write of the way I used to write, without reservations of any kind. Last Thursday at the Harvard Square theatre, I saw my rock and roll past flash before my eyes. And I saw something else: I saw rock and roll future and its name is Bruce Springsteen. And on a night when I needed to feel young, he made me feel like I was hearing music for the first time.

== Between the lines ==
In 1975, The Real Paper was purchased by Ralph I. Fine, David Rockefeller Jr., and eventual Massachusetts governor William Weld, who installed Marty Linsky as editor. Linsky succeeded David Gelber, brought to The Real Paper as a writer from The Village Voice. Gelber subsequently had a distinguished career as a documentary television producer at 60 Minutes for 25 years and at ABC News, winning eight Emmys and numerous other awards. His latest project is a series on global warming, Years of Living Dangerously. Marty Linsky went on to become a leadership consultant and author and Harvard Kennedy School faculty member. Subsequent editors included Richard Rosen, and Mark Zanger, the author of several books on food history. Rosen's many books – from mysteries like Strike Three You're Dead to non-fiction works like Buffalo in the House and Such Good Girls to humor (Bad Cat, Not Available in Any Store) – and his television efforts, including the mock local news broadcast The Generic News – are chronicled in full at rdrosen.com.

By late 1975, the competition between The Real Paper and the Boston Phoenix was being described as mainly economic. By 1977, intimations of "computer" competition for ads first appeared. In 1979, the Boston Globe's Nathan Cobb, who had lionized the two papers seven years earlier, wrote a story headlined "Their big worry is going broke." "Not as gritty as they used to be," wrote the Globe's Bruce McCabe later that year. "Reality catches 'those' papers," was the headline in 1980. In 1981, The Real Paper was shut down, its assets again sold to competitor Mindich and the Boston Phoenix.

Of the paper's demise, Jeff McLaughlin, describing the 1981 Boston arts scene in the Boston Globe, (January 4, 1982), wrote: "Hardest hit was journalism. Financial problems caused The Real Paper to cease publication, silencing a voice that was devoted to community-based efforts in the arts as in other cultural fields. The Phoenix won new readers with The Real Paper's demise," but in 2013, The Phoenix too ceased publication

Fred Barron, who had written for both The Boston Phoenix and The Real Paper, used his alternative newspaper experiences as the basis for a screenplay, Between the Lines, filmed in 1977 by Joan Micklin Silver. The success of that film led to a short-lived TV sitcom, also titled Between the Lines.

== Archives ==
The Real Paper has been issued on microfilm by Bell and Howell.

In November 2015, The Boston Globe announced that Northeastern University's Snell Library Archives and Special Collections had received copies of The Real Paper as part of their acquisition of The Boston Phoenix records. Hard copies are available to the public at Snell Library.

== See also ==
- List of underground newspapers of the 1960s counterculture
- Between the Lines (1977 film)

== Bibliography ==
- The Alternative Press Goes Straight, Nathan Cobb, Boston Globe, June 9, 1974; pg. D6
- Gerald Peary interviews and film reviews for The Real Paper (1977–1981)
- Life and Death on the Corporate Battlefield by Paul Solman and Thomas Friedman (Simon & Schuster, 1983)
