= Ronnie Kosloff =

Professor (born 1948)

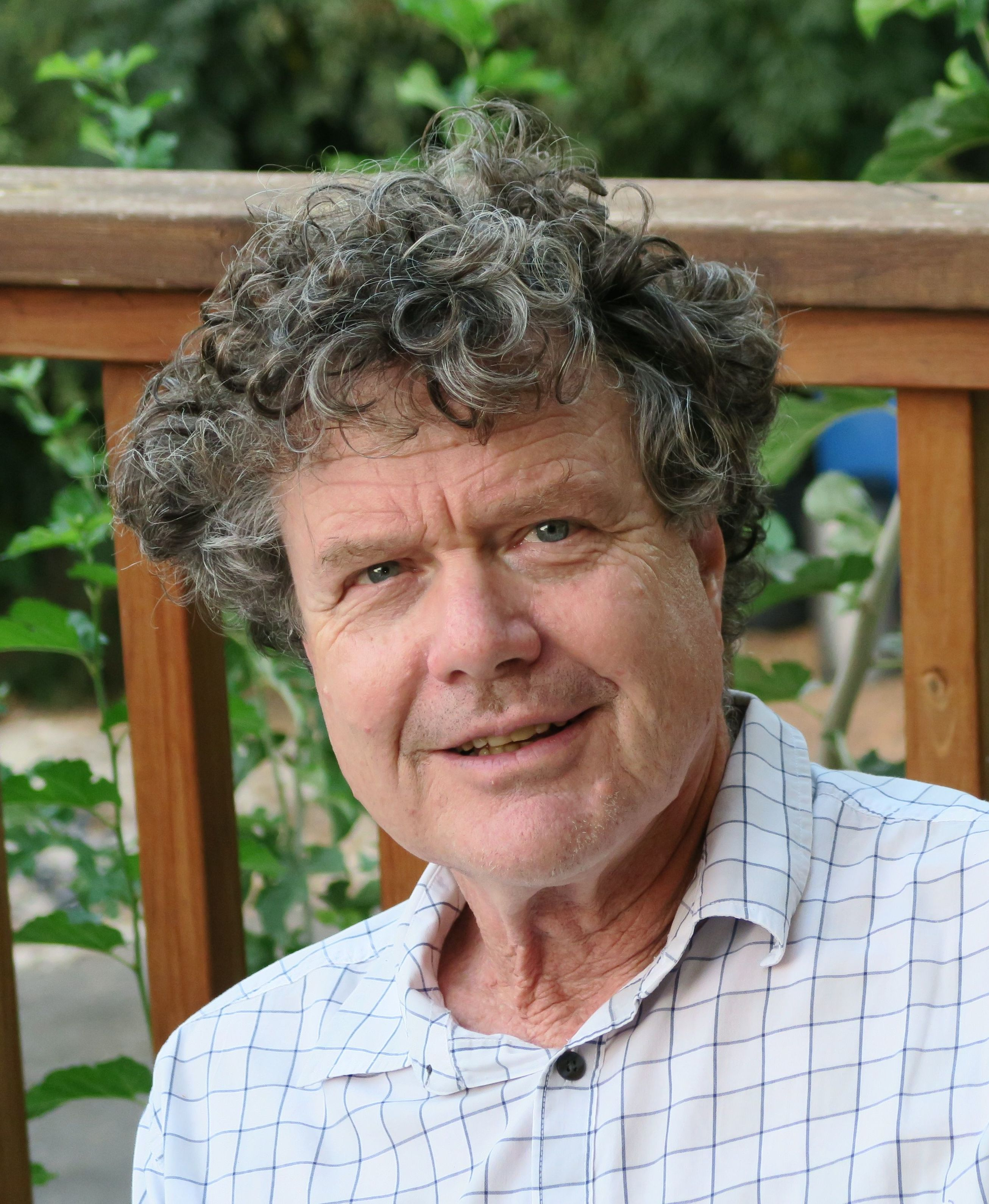
- Born: July 26, 1948 (age 78); Los Angeles, U.S.
- Education: Hebrew University
- Spouse: Yaffa Fridheim Kosloff
- Awards: Feher Prize for distinguished researchers in science (1995); Kolthoff Prize(2003); The Israel Chemical Society Prize of Excellence (2007)
- Scientific career
- Fields: Theoretical chemistry, quantum thermodynamics
- Workplaces: The Hebrew University
- Doctoral advisor: Raphael David Levine
- Other academic advisors: Stuart A. Rice

Ronnie Kosloff (Hebrew: רוני קוזלוב; born July 26, 1948) is a professor of theoretical chemistry at the Institute of Chemistry and Fritz Haber Center for Molecular Dynamics, Hebrew University of Jerusalem.

== Education and career ==
Ronnie Kosloff grew up in Jerusalem and then moved to Haifa in Israel. He graduated from Hebrew Reali School in Haifa in 1966. He joined the armoured corps of the Israel Defence Force. He studied at the Hebrew University from 1969 to 1978 when he obtained his PhD. From 1978 to 1980 he was a post doctoral fellow at the University of Chicago. Ronnie Kosloff joined the Hebrew University faculty at 1981 where he serves as a Sonneborn professor of theoretical chemistry.

== Research ==
Ronnie Kosloff contributed to the theory of quantum molecular dynamics. He developed methods to follow the evolution of a molecular system by solving the time dependent Schrödinger equation. Together with David Tannor and Stuart A Rice they originated the pump-dump scheme for coherent control. The idea of coherent control was extended to Unitary transformations, a key ingredient in quantum gates. More recent work is on coherent control of binary chemical reactions.

Ronnie Kosloff originated the dynamical study of quantum heat engines. This study is part of the emerging field of quantum thermodynamics.

== Honors and awards ==
Ronnie Kosloff is a member of the International Academy of Quantum Molecular Science and Academia Europaea. He won the Feher Prize for distinguished researchers in science in 1995. He won the Kolthoff Prize of the Technion – Israel Institute of Technology in 2003. He won the Israel Chemical Society Prize of Excellence in 2007. He is an Alexander von Humboldt fellow 2019.
