= Stuart A. Rice =

American chemist (1932–2024)

- Born: Stuart Alan Rice; January 6, 1932; New York City, U.S.
- Died: December 22, 2024 (aged 92); Chicago, IL, US
- Education: Bronx High School of Science, Brooklyn College, Harvard University, Yale University
- Awards: ACS Award in Pure Chemistry (1963); Peter Debye Award (1985); National Medal of Science (1999); Wolf Prize (2011)
- Scientific career
- Fields: Theoretical chemistry
- Workplaces: The University of Chicago

Stuart Alan Rice (January 6, 1932 – December 22, 2024) was an American theoretical chemist and physical chemist. He was well known as a theoretical chemist who also performed experimental research, having spent much of his career working in multiple areas of physical chemistry. He was the Frank P. Hixon Distinguished Service Professor at the University of Chicago. During his tenure at the University of Chicago, Rice trained more than 100 Ph.D. students and postdoctoral researchers. He was elected as member of the National Academy of science in 1963. He received the National Medal of Science in 1999.

== Education and career ==
Stuart Rice attended the Bronx High School of Science, received his bachelor's degree in 1952 from Brooklyn College, and earned his master's and doctorate from Harvard University in 1954 and 1955, respectively. He was almost unable to attend graduate school due to contracting tuberculosis, but was cured of the disease through an experimental treatment of isoniazid and streptomycin. He remained at Harvard as a junior fellow for three years, although he spent the last two years of the fellowship doing research work at Yale University's chemistry department. After the fellowship, he joined the faculty of The University of Chicago in 1957, where he remained until his death.

Rice served the university in a wide variety of capacities during his fifty-seven year tenure. He served as the director of the James Franck Institute (the university's center for physical chemistry and condensed matter physics) from 1961 to 1967. He was chairman of the department of chemistry from 1971 to 1976 and was dean of the physical sciences division from 1981 to 1995. He served as dean for the Toyota Technological Institute at Chicago from October 2006 through October 2010 and as interim president of the institute from October 2010 to April 2013.

In addition to his work at the university, he was on the board of governors at Tel Aviv University, served as editor for the journals Chemical Physics Letters and Advances in Chemical Physics, and co-authored several physical chemistry textbooks with Stephen Berry and John Ross.

== Research ==
Rice began his scientific career as a high school student and published on this work. He completed his doctoral dissertation under Paul Doty, contributing to the then-emerging field of DNA research; the project shared both experimental and theoretical components, which became a hallmark of his later work.

During his time at Yale, Stuart Rice began to study the transport properties of liquids. He helped to determine the properties of liquid noble gases and methane, while also exploring the theoretical background of transport in liquids as well, comparing the results to simulations of Lennard-Jones fluids.

Following this work he helped to develop the theory of electronic excitations (excitons) in molecular crystals and liquids, eventually moving into the area of radiationless molecular transitions, beginning his own experimental work after the development of the Bixon-Jortner model, while also working with collaborators on extending the theoretical model of these transitions. This research led him to investigate the effects of quantum chaos on excited molecules, and to couple the developing model of transitions with quantum chaos in order to attain control of the transition of excited molecules. This led to the field of coherent control, quantum control through laser excitation, which was developed by other scientists at the University of Chicago.

At the same time, he also began work on understanding the electrical properties of liquid metals, where the lack of translational orders frustrated attempts to understand their electronic band structure. The discrepancy between the dielectric results of reflectivity and ellipsometry data of liquid mercury led to work on the nature of conductivity at the liquid-vapor surface of liquid metal, ultimately showing that the existence of ion inhomogeneities at the interface led to electronic changes in the bulk liquid that persist for several atomic diameters into a liquid.

Stuart became immersed in the theory of freezing, which evolved to the study of quasi two-dimensional liquids.

In 1985, Stuart A. Rice, David J. Tannor, and Ronnie Kosloff introduced a new approach to the active control of molecular dynamics. They demonstrated theoretically that the branching ratios of competing chemical reactions could be controlled using a carefully timed sequence of ultrashort laser pulses, known as the pump–dump scheme. The first pulse (pump) creates a vibrational wavepacket on an excited electronic potential-energy surface. After a controlled period of evolution, the second pulse (dump) transfers the wavepacket back to the ground electronic state, directing the reaction toward a desired product channel. This theoretical proposal was subsequently validated by experimental demonstrations. Stuart Rice subsequently helped consolidate the time-dependent and time-independent approaches to coherent control, identifying quantum coherence as their common underlying principleIe.

Stuart Rice proposed with M. Demirplak that a counter adiabatic control field that can force a system to follow an adiabatic path in a finite time, establishing a framework known as shortcuts to adiabaticity, which has since become widely used in quantum technologies.

Smaller research topics that Rice published on include work on the chemistry of water, the theory of freezing liquids, the properties of monolayers on liquids, and confined colloidal systems, amongst others.

== Personal life and death ==
Rice was famous at the University of Chicago for eating lunch almost every weekday at the university's Quadrangle Club restaurant (a faculty club), where he dined over 9,000 times. Rice was known to sit at the head of the chemistry table, not because he was the most senior member of the department, but because he was very tall.

Rice was married to Marian Coopersmith from 1952 until her death in 1994. From 1997 to his own death, Rice was married to Ruth O'Brien. He died on December 22, 2024, at the age of 92.

== Honors and awards ==
Rice was awarded the National Medal of Science, the highest scientific prize awarded in the United States, in 1999. He was awarded the Wolf Prize in Chemistry in 2011, along with Krzysztof Matyjaszewski and Ching Tang. He was a Fellow of both the National Academy of Sciences and the American Academy of Arts and Sciences and a member of the American Philosophical Society. In 1970, Rice was awarded the Llewellyn John and Harriet Manchester Quantrell Award for Excellence in Undergraduate Teaching, the nation’s oldest prize for undergraduate teaching, a highly esteemed faculty award at The University of Chicago.

== Impact ==
Over the course of his long career Rice has shaped much debate on theoretical physical chemistry. He is cited on the National Medal of Science "for changing the very nature of modern physical chemistry through his research, teaching and writing, using imaginative approaches to both experiment and theory that have inspired a new generation of scientists." With over 100 doctoral students to his credit, Stuart Rice has had a great impact on the field of physical chemistry simply through the number of research scientists he has trained. Theoretical chemist David Tannor, who is the Hermann Mayer Professorial Chair in the department of chemical physics at the Weizmann Institute of Science in Israel, did his post-doc work with Stuart Rice and David W. Oxtoby at the University of Chicago. Paul Alivisatos, president of University of Chicago, who studied with Rice as an undergraduate, remembers his teaching as "exact and illuminating and inspiring. As long as he continued to speak, he rendered his difficult subject with simplicity and clarity."
