= Boston Metro =

Boston Metro or Metro Boston may refer to:

- MBTA subway, the subway system of the Massachusetts Bay Transportation Authority, locally known as "The MBTA" or "The T"
- Metro Boston, the Boston edition of the Metro International newspaper published from 2001 to 2020, launched by Tab Communications
- Greater Boston, the metropolitan area surrounding and including Boston
