= David Ansen =

American film critic

- Occupations: Film critic, writer
- Writing career
- Language: English
- Genres: Film criticism, documentary writing
- Notable work: Senior film critic at Newsweek
- Notable awards: Three-time Page One Award (Newspaper Guild of New York); Membership in New York Film Critics Circle; Membership in National Society of Film Critics; Membership in Los Angeles Film Critics Association

David Ansen is an American film critic. He was a senior editor for Newsweek, where he served as film critic from 1977 to 2008 and subsequently contributed to the magazine in a freelance capacity. Prior to writing for Newsweek, he served as chief film critic for Boston's The Real Paper. Ansen appeared in This Film Is Not Yet Rated.

Ansen has also written several documentaries for television: on Greta Garbo (for TNT), Groucho Marx (HBO), Elizabeth Taylor (PBS), and the Ace Award-winning All About Bette (Bette Davis) for TNT. He was on the selection committee of the New York Film Festival from 1990 to 1998.

From 2010 to 2014, he was the artistic director of the Los Angeles Film Festival. In 2015, Ansen was named lead programmer of the Palm Springs International Film Festival.

== Awards and affiliations ==
Ansen is a current or previous member of the New York Film Critics Circle, the National Society of Film Critics, and the Los Angeles Film Critics Association and is a three-time winner of the Page One Award from the Newspaper Guild of New York.
