= David W. Oxtoby =

President of Pomona College

David Oxtoby
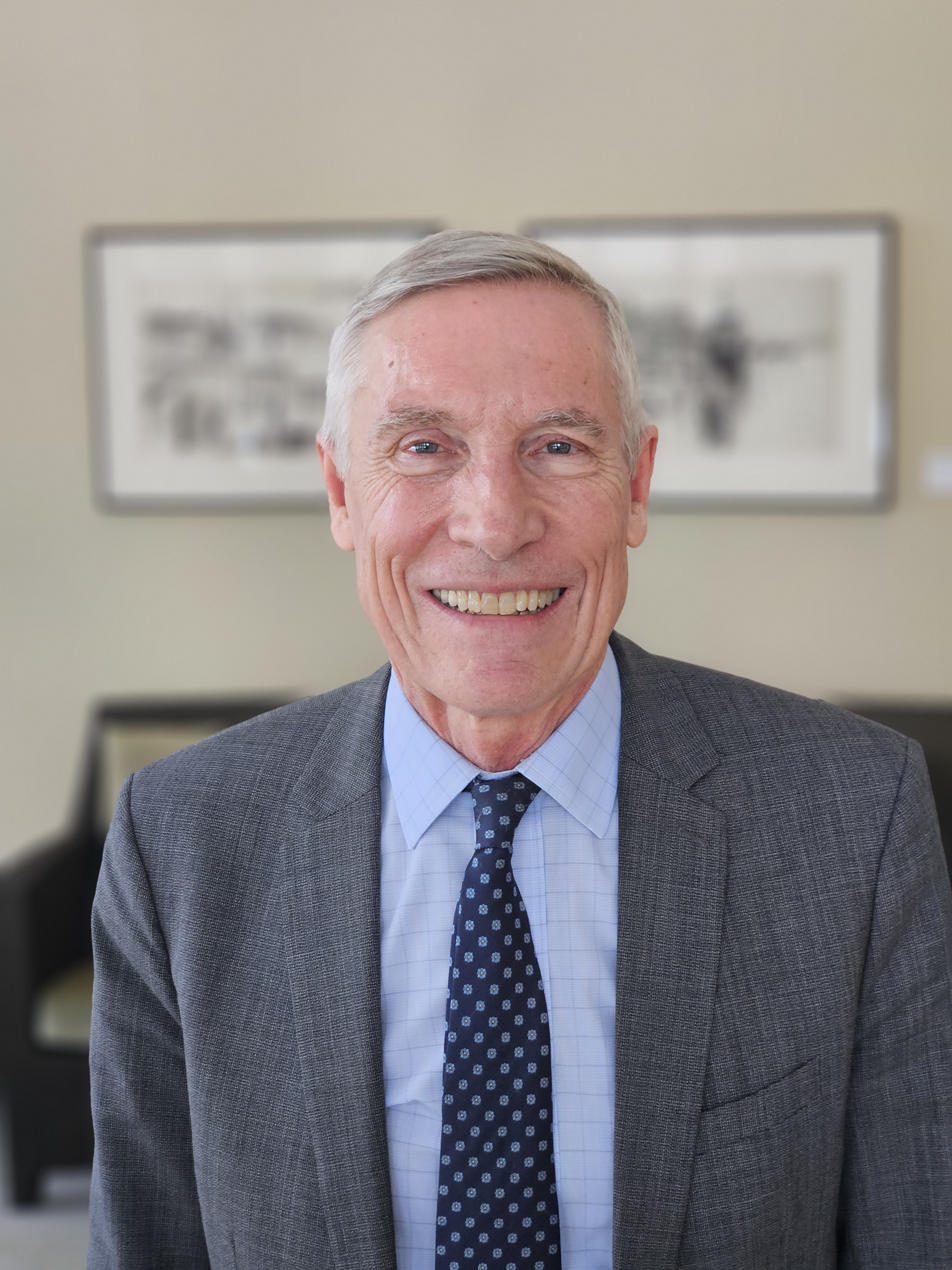
- Oxtoby in 2024

President of American Academy of Arts and Sciences
- In office 2019–2024
- Preceded by: Jonathan Fanton
- Succeeded by: Laurie L. Patton

9th President of Pomona College
- In office July 1, 2003 – July 1, 2017
- Preceded by: Peter W. Stanley
- Succeeded by: G. Gabrielle Starr

Personal details
- Born: David William Oxtoby; October 17, 1951 (age 74) Bryn Mawr, Pennsylvania, U.S.
- Spouse: Claire Oxtoby
- Children: 3
- Relatives: John C. Oxtoby (father)
- Education: Harvard University (BS); University of California, Berkeley (MS, PhD)

David William Oxtoby (born 1951) is an American academic who served as the President of American Academy of Arts and Sciences from 2019 to 2024, as well as the ninth president of Pomona College from 2003 to 2017.

== Education ==
A theoretical chemist, he received his bachelor's degree in chemistry and physics at Harvard University (summa cum laude) and his PhD in chemistry in 1975 from the University of California, Berkeley.

== Career ==
Prior to his appointment as President at Pomona College in 2003, he was the dean of the physical sciences division at the University of Chicago. In February 2016, he announced his intention to step down as president of Pomona College in June 2017. G. Gabrielle Starr officially succeeded him on July 1, 2017.

In December 2018, the American Academy of Arts and Sciences announced that Oxtoby would serve as its 47th president, succeeding Jonathan Fanton. Oxtoby began his term in January 2019.

As a research chemist, Oxtoby is author or co-author of more than 158 scientific articles on subjects such as light scattering, chemical reaction dynamics, nucleation and phase transitions. David Oxtoby's work on liquid-solid transition, and nucleation of crystalline solid from supercooled liquid have been widely used. He has been invited as a guest lecturer at conferences and institutions around the globe and served as visiting professor at the University of Paris, the University of Bristol, and the University of Sydney. He also co-authored two popular textbooks in chemistry: Principles of Modern Chemistry and Chemistry: Science of Change. He has received fellowships from the Guggenheim, Alexander von Humboldt, Camille and Henry Dreyfus, Alfred P. Sloan, Danforth and National Science foundations.

Theoretical physical chemist Biman Bagchi who is the National Science Chair Professor of India at the Indian Institute of Science, Bengaluru, India, carried out his post doctoral work with Professor David Oxtoby (1981–1983). Theoretical chemist David Tannor, who is the Hermann Mayer Professorial Chair in the department of chemical physics at the Weizmann Institute of Science in Israel, did his post-doc work with Stuart Rice and David Oxtoby at the University of Chicago.

He received the Quantrell Award.

== Organisational affiliations ==
He is a fellow of the American Physical Society and a member of the American Chemical Society and the American Association for the Advancement of Science. In 2012, he was inducted into the American Academy of Arts and Sciences.

In 2020 he was elected to the American Philosophical Society.
