= Brookline TAB =

Local newspaper serving Brookline, Massachusetts, US

- Type: Weekly newspaper
- Format: Print, Digital
- Owner: GateHouse Media
- Editor: Kathleen Cordeiro
- Founded: 1979
- Headquarters: Framingham, Massachusetts
- Circulation: 15,500
- ISSN: 0745-2071
- OCLC number: 233144898
- Website: brookline.wickedlocal.com

The Brookline TAB is a local newspaper that primarily serves the town of Brookline, Massachusetts along with the surrounding area of Norfolk County, Massachusetts. It was founded in 1979 and is published weekly on Thursdays. The newspaper is owned by GateHouse Media and the circulation is estimated to be 15,500 copies. Its headquarters are located on 1 Speen St., Framingham, MA.

== History ==
The Brookline TAB was originally named The tab, Brookline edition until September 18, 1984 when it took on its current name. It was initially owned by Tab Communications Inc.(also called Tabloid Newspaper Publishers), a weekly publisher in Greater Boston which was first based in Newton, Massachusetts before it was moved to neighboring town Needham.

Tab Communications Inc. was bought along with its 14 newspapers in 1992 by Fidelity Investments following a rough economic year. During this time, Tab Communications was serving as a partially autonomous division of Community Newspaper Company, or CNC, which was founded by Fidelity, until it was disbanded by the corporation into two other sectors in 1996.

Fidelity proceeded to sell CNC to the Boston Herald in 2001 before it became the largest component of its current owner, GateHouse Media, in 2006, upon being purchased by them. By 2011, GateHouse had gotten completely rid of the "@cnc.com" domain and the CNC branding as a whole when it opted to replace it for "WickedLocal.com", the current website and branding for the Brookline TAB.

In mid-2020, the police blotter was dropped from the publication.

In 2022, the paper ceased its print edition and went online only.

== Coverage ==
Within local news, the Brookline TAB covers various sections including sports, entertainment, business, lifestyle and community events. In addition, it has a market place for items such as cars, homes and jobs. The online version of the newspaper also includes various blogs such as the community blog, the "Brookline TAB Blog". The "TAB" suffix of the Brookline TAB refers to the advertisement heavy content of the newspaper.
