= Laura Shapiro =

American food journalist and historian (born 1946)

- Born: June 20, 1946 (age 80); Cambridge, Massachusetts, U.S.
- Occupations: Journalist, historian
- Writing career
- Notable works: Perfection Salad (1986); Something from the Oven (2004); Julia Child (2007); What She Ate (2017)
- Notable awards: 1995 James Beard Foundation Award; 2008 IACP Award
- Website: laurashapirowriter.com

Laura Shapiro (born June 20, 1946) is an American food journalist and historian. Shapiro was a dance critic for The Boston Globe in the 1970s and joined Newsweek magazine in 1984. She shifted to food writing during her 15-year tenure at Newsweek, and in 1995, she won a James Beard Foundation Award for one of her magazine features.

Shapiro has written four books on culinary history. Her 2007 biography of television chef Julia Child won the Literary Food Writing award from the International Association of Culinary Professionals.

== Biography ==
Laura Shapiro was born in Cambridge, Massachusetts, on June 20, 1946. She is one of two daughters of Frances Sidd (1917–1997), a former caterer who worked for the Boston Symphony Orchestra (BSO) and Boston Ballet, and Harry Shapiro (1914–2014), who played the French horn in the BSO from 1937 to 1976 and was later the orchestra manager at the Tanglewood Music Center in Lenox. She was raised in Needham, and she graduated from Needham High School and then Radcliffe College. As her father played in the Boston Symphony Orchestra, her summers growing up were spent in Berkshire County. She recalls some important life experiences in the Berkshires, especially in the towns of Lenox and Stockbridge and the Lenox Library, describing the latter as one of her favorite places. Her career began at the Cambridge Phoenix and the alternative weekly The Real Paper; at the latter publication, in the 1970s, she mainly wrote about the women's movement. She was a dance critic for The Boston Globe later in the 1970s, and she joined Newsweek magazine in 1984 to write on dance. She ultimately spent 15 years writing on food for the publication, during which she won the 1995 James Beard Foundation Award in the category "Magazine Writing on Diet, Nutrition & Health" for her feature "The Skinny on Fat". Her writing has appeared in Gastronomica, Gourmet, The New Yorker, and The New York Times.

A culinary historian, Shapiro has written four books about women and food. From 2009 to 2010, she was a fellow at the Cullman Center for Scholars and Writers at the New York Public Library, where she worked on a collection of biographical essays. Shapiro and Rebecca Federman curated the exhibition Lunch Hour NYC at the New York Public Library, June 2012 to February 2013, which discusses how New York City gave the lunch hour its modern identity, examining a 150-year history. She appeared in the first episode of a food podcast hosted by the Oxford Symposium on Food and Cookery, Ox Tales, released in 2018.

Shapiro served a three-year term on the Massachusetts Council on the Arts and Humanities ending in 1974, and was appointed for another term in 1976 by state governor Michael Dukakis.

As of 2018, Shapiro lives in New York City. She is married to John Stratton Hawley, a professor of religion at Columbia University's Barnard College.

== Writing ==
=== Perfection Salad (1986) ===
Shapiro published her first book, Perfection Salad: Women and Cooking at the Turn of the Century, with Farrar, Straus & Giroux in 1986. It examines the influence of science and industry on home cooking and the roles of women in the U.S. in the late 19th century, including the home economics movement and the development of the American cuisine.

In an effort to gain background information for her work at The Real Paper, Shapiro began reading about the women's movement of the 19th-century at Schlesinger Library, in Cambridge. During this time, she started conducting archival research on women's lives in the kitchen, an intersection of topics she felt was overlooked, and working on what would be Perfection Salad. Research for the book led her to surmise that "[f]ood coverage is either written by the food industry or at the service of the food industry."

Barbara Ehrenreich of New York Times Book Review felt the book had "deft humor" that some readers "may find unbecoming to a work of such impeccable scholarship", though she felt it was appropriate given the subject matter. In a review of the 2001 reprint, Kirkus Reviews noted some "risible facts" in Shapiro's history, but felt it was not "palatable or even digestible reading fare". Maxine Margolis, writing in The American Historical Review, wrote that the book provided "a wealth of data on a topic that has been too long ignored" despite insufficient analysis in some places.

=== Something from the Oven (2004) ===
Something from the Oven: Reinventing Dinner in 1950s America (Viking Press, 2004) covers the history of cooking in the U.S. in the 1950s, from the end of World War II to the mid-1960s. Shapiro argues how the food industry advertisers tried to convince American women that cooking was hard and time-consuming work in order to encourage them to buy packaged, dehydrated, and frozen foods. The industry's actions would begin to be countered with two events in 1963: the debut of Julia Child's cooking program The French Chef, and the publication of Betty Friedan's influential feminist book The Feminine Mystique. While "...Betty Friedan was telling women they could take charge of their own lives", Shapiro said, "Julia Child was telling women that could take charge of dinner. It was the same message."

Kirkus Reviews praised the book's entertainment value and the quality of Shapiro's research, but they felt that its "parts don't cohere into a consistent whole" even though there are common themes. Paul Levy of The New York Times found Shapiro "at her considerable best" in her biographies of the writers who brought about changes in the history of domestic cooking, and he also praised Shapiro's research. A reviewer in The New Yorker found the book "very funny, and also subtle."

=== Julia Child (2007) ===
Shapiro's 2007 biography of Julia Child was published by Lipper/Viking as part of its Penguin Lives biography series. Shapiro said the short and non-comprehensive format of the Penguin Lives series allowed her to avoid "topics that were relevant but not that interesting to me, for instance comparative approaches to classic French cooking".

The book won the 2008 Literary Food Writing award from the International Association of Culinary Professionals. Dorothy Kalins in The New York Times wrote that Shapiro exhibited "enormous grace and food savvy" given the limited length of the Penguin Lives entries. Kalins felt that Shapiro had "deftly distill[ed]" Child's relationship with her husband, Paul, and she was intrigued by Shapiro's account that Child was not a naturally proficient cook. Kirkus Reviews wrote that Shapiro had produced a "vivid biography" of Child which characterized her as a "steadfast, vigorous, analytical person" and someone who was not a natural chef. Publishers Weekly found the biography "short but comprehensive", noting that it does not withhold from describing Child's "less-flattering" qualities. The Pittsburgh Post-Gazette found the book to be the definitive analysis of her career.

=== What She Ate (2017) ===
What She Ate: Six Remarkable Women and the Food That Tells Their Stories (Viking Press, 2017) contains essays on the relationship that six famous women—Dorothy Wordsworth, Rosa Lewis, Eleanor Roosevelt, Eva Braun, Barbara Pym, and Helen Gurley Brown—had with food through their lives. Shapiro researched sources such as diary entries, dinner party accounts, and shopping lists, later remarking her research was akin to "standing in line at the supermarket and peering into the other carts."

Bill Daley of the Chicago Tribune found Shapiro's stories on each women "sharply drawn" reflections of their personalities and circumstances, specifically Shapiro's handling of Rosa Lewis, which Daley felt was "[p]articularly well-executed". Daly also felt that focusing on the six women rather than more popular subjects in cooking history, the book provides insight on the "roles and expectations" of women and men especially in the 20th century. In The Washington Post, author Jennifer Reese wrote that Shapiro approached the subjects like a "surgeon, analytical tools sharpened", compared to other food writing which Reese feels is "unrigorous" and overly emotional. Fresh Air book critic Maureen Corrigan said that Shapiro's analysis of the women's food stories allowed "[s]lowly the more familiar accounts of each of their lives recede and other, messier narratives emerge."
