= Daniel C. Tosteson =

American physician, physiologist, and medical school dean (1925–2009)

- Born: February 5, 1925
- Died: May 27, 2009 (aged 84); Boston, U.S.
- Education: Harvard College; Harvard Medical School
- Known for: Dean of Harvard Medical School; New Pathway curriculum Medical education reform
- Spouse: Magdalena Tieffenberg Tosteson
- Awards: Fellow, American Academy of Arts and Sciences (1979)
- Scientific career
- Fields: Physiology; Cell biology Medical education
- Workplaces: Washington University School of Medicine; Duke University School of Medicine; University of Chicago; Harvard Medical School

Daniel Charles Tosteson (February 5, 1925 – May 27, 2009) was an American physician, physiologist, academic administrator, and dean of Harvard Medical School from 1977 to 1997. He was associated with the New Pathway curriculum at Harvard Medical School and served as president of the American Academy of Arts and Sciences from 1997 to 2000.

== Early life and education ==
Tosteson was born February 5, 1925 in Milwaukee, Wisconsin and grew up in nearby Wauwatosa. His undergraduate education was at Harvard College (class of 1946), after which he went to Harvard Medical School, completing his M.D. in 1949. He performed a residency at Presbyterian Hospital in New York City, followed by fellowships at Brookhaven National Laboratory, the National Institutes of Health, and Cambridge University.

== Career ==
After completing his residency and fellowships, Tosteson joined the faculty at Washington University School of Medicine in St. Louis, where he worked for just three years, until 1961, at which point he moved to the Duke University School of Medicine, where he served for 14 years. At Duke University, he became chair of physiology and pharmacology, before he was recruited to the Pritzker School of Medicine at the University of Chicago, where he was dean of the Division of Biological Science and vice president of the University of Chicago Medical Center. He returned to Harvard Medical School in 1977 as dean, after serving as dean at Chicago for just 18 months. He would hold the position of dean at Harvard for 20 years. In that role, he was also the Caroline Shields Walker Distinguished Professor of Cell Biology.

In his work as a researcher, Tosteson was a physiologist and professor of cell biology, and he maintained a laboratory research program during his term as Harvard dean. His laboratory research studied membrane phenomena, making contributions to understanding degenerative diseases including atherosclerosis and rheumatoid arthritis. Some of his later publications included work with his wife, researcher Magdalena Tieffenberg Tosteson.

Tosteson was elected as a fellow of the American Academy of Arts and Sciences in 1979. After completing 20 years as dean at HMS, Tosteson went on to serve as president of American Academy of Arts and Sciences from 1997 to 2000. As president, he oversaw a strategic planning initiative for Academy mission, long-term goals, and research initiatives.

== Harvard Medical School deanship ==
In his 20 years as dean of the Harvard Medical School (HMS), Tosteson oversaw and implemented many changes in teaching methods, academic departments, the endowment, faculty, and facilities. The endowment increased from $128 million to $1.1 billion during his tenure. He led the renovation of most existing HMS buildings and added new buildings, including the Warren Alpert Building for basic research. The endowment growth supported both these major construction projects and the expansion of the faculty, including establishing the Department of Genetics in 1980. Overall, he created or reorganized the following departments: Genetics; Cell Biology; Biological Chemistry and Molecular Pharmacology; Health Care Policy; Social Medicine, later Global Health and Social Medicine. Tosteson oversaw Harvard Medical School’s first conflict-of-interest policy that required faculty disclosure of company relationships.

He expanded the Ph.D. program, including playing an instrumental role in 1994 in establishing the Biological and Biomedical Sciences Program Ph.D. program. Tosteson also expanded continuing education for practicing physicians. He helped establish a publishing venture now called Harvard Health Publishing, a consumer health information division that provides health articles for lay readers.

The Tosteson Medical Education Center at Harvard was named for him, in honor of his 20 years of service to HMS.

== Medical education reform ==
Tosteson developed and implemented the New Pathway curriculum at HMS; this was launched in 1985 and described as "a radical restructuring of medical education". Tosteson argued that rapid changes in medicine required changes in general medical education, including changes in content, process, and organization.

Tosteson argued that medical education should emphasize attitudes and skills as well as factual knowledge, with lifelong learning as an important goal of medical education. He favored small-group education for discussing cases and comparing interpretations, as well as active student participation in the process of learning. In the Harvard program, formal lecture hours and dependency on texts were reduced, while problem-oriented, case-based tutorials in small groups were increased, using clinical experiences and patient relationships as part of early medical education. This curriculum emphasized problem-solving skills, critical thinking, and ability to approach unfamiliar medical situations. Beginning in 1987, incoming Harvard medical students were assigned to one of five academic societies, each with faculty and student membership and responsibility for students’ academic progress.

== Honors and awards ==
- Member of National Academy of Medicine (1972)
- Fellow of American Academy of Arts and Sciences (1979)
- Member of Association of American Physicians
- Abraham Flexner Award for Distinguished Service to Medical Education from Association of American Medical Colleges
- Harvard Medal for extraordinary service to Harvard University

== Personal life ==
Tosteson was known as an avid sailor, with a boat in East Boothbay, Maine. He was married to Magdalena Tieffenberg Tosteson, an investigator in cell biology and biophysics at HMS, with whom he published. His children included sons Joshua and Tor and four daughters, Heather, Ingrid, Zoe Tosteson Losada, and Carrie Marais. His son Tor Tosteson is a Professor of Biomedical Data Science, Dartmouth College, and fellow of the American Statistical Association. Tosteson died May 27, 2009 at home in Boston, from complications of Parkinson’s disease.
