= Kyle Cheney (journalist) =

American journalist

- Born: New York City, U.S.
- Education: Boston University (BS)
- Years active: 2006–present
- Employer: Politico
- Spouse: Hannah Cheney
- Children: 1

Kyle Cheney is an American journalist working as a congressional reporter for Politico and as a political analyst for CNN and MSNBC.

== Early life and education ==
Cheney was raised in New York City. He graduated with a Bachelor of Science degree in journalism from Boston University in 2007, where he was an editor of the university's student newspaper, The Daily Free Press.

== Career ==
Cheney began his career as a reporter covering Massachusetts politics for the State House News Service in 2006. He moved to Politico in 2012 as a reporter covering healthcare and news surrounding the Affordable Care Act implemented by the Obama administration.

Cheney was part of the politics team assigned to cover the 2014 midterm elections and then the Republican caucus during the 2016 presidential election. He joined the Congress team after the 2016 elections.

In 2019, Cheney became one of the leading reporters for Politico on Capitol Hill and has broken numerous stories about the Trump impeachment inquiry led by House Democrats. He has regularly appeared on CNN, MSNBC, and C-SPAN.

== Personal life ==
Cheney is married to Hannah Cheney, senior manager of editorial content at Hilton Hotels, and has a daughter.
