= Andrew Oliver (1731–1799) =

American jurist and scientist (1731-1799)

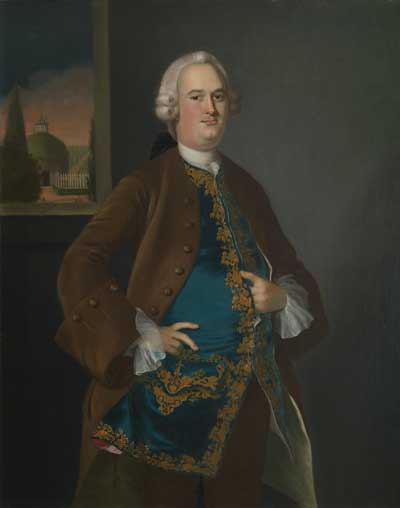
Oil painting of Andrew Oliver in 1755 by Joseph Blackburn (fl. 1752–1777)

Andrew Oliver (November 13, 1731 – December 6, 1799) was an American jurist and scientist.

Andrew Oliver was the only child to survive to adulthood of Andrew Oliver and Mary Fitch, daughter of Colonel Thomas Fitsch. His mother died one year after his birth. On December 19, 1734, his father married Mary Sanford of Newport, Rhode Island, the sister-in-law of Thomas Hutchinson. The couple had fourteen children.

Oliver attended Harvard college, graduating in 1749 before continuing his studies and earning master's degrees at Yale (1751) and Harvard (1752). After marrying, Oliver relocated to his wife's hometown of Salem. He held minor public offices before becoming a county judge in 1761 and a representative of Salem to the Massachusetts General Court the following year.

== American Revolution ==
He had a complicated relationship with the growing rebel movement, oftentimes voting in favor of reductions in taxes and duties and yet was a member of a loyalist family and occupied a Tory position for a time (before realizing it made him a target and resigning). He joined a local militia in an attempt to regain approval, but upon asking to be excused from a meeting due to unfavorable weather, his constituents were left unsatisfied. When the war broke out, his loyalist family went into hiding while he remained in Salem, not for any political reason, but rather to continue his scientific inquiries into the nature of air.

== Scientific enquiry ==
Most notably, Oliver proposed that comet tails were made up of air, and that life could exist in such air. Inspired by Benjamin Franklin and other contemporaries, he also asserted that electricity permeates air and studied its role in causing thunderstorms. Along with John Adams, he helped found the American Academy of Arts and Sciences in Massachusetts. He was elected as a member to the American Philosophical Society in 1773.

In the final years of his life, Oliver's scientific activity mostly ceased due to his gout and declining finances and he died in such a state, at home in Salem.
