= Lisa Schwarzbaum =

American film critic

- Born: July 5, 1952 (age 74); New York City, U.S.
- Education: Sarah Lawrence College
- Occupation: Film critic
- Website: Entertainment Weekly

Lisa Schwarzbaum (born July 5, 1952) is an American film critic. She joined Entertainment Weekly as a senior writer in 1991, working as a film critic for the magazine alongside Owen Gleiberman from 1995 to 2013.

== Early life ==
Lisa Schwarzbaum was born on July 5, 1952, to Leon Schwarzbaum, a combat engineer during the Pacific War. The oldest child of a Jewish family raised in the Bronx, she has two brothers.

Schwarzbaum has credited WWOR-TV's Million Dollar Movie series for sparking her interest in films through its presentation of RKO Pictures' catalog. After concentrating in music at Sarah Lawrence College, her mother suggested that she become an art critic to combine her interest in writing. Lisa Schwarzbaum's early work under Leo Lerman in the arts and entertainment section of Mademoiselle further shaped her career as a film critic.

== Career ==
Schwarzbaum's writing career began with reviewing classical music for The Real Paper and The Boston Globe. Aside from her work as a film critic for Entertainment Weekly from 1995 to 2013, she has also written for The New York Times, Time, Slate, The New Statesman and The Baltimore Sun. She is a member of the National Society of Film Critics, is a past president of the New York Film Critics Circle, and has served a five-year term on the New York Film Festival's selection committee.

Following Gene Siskel's 1999 death, Schwarzbaum served as a guest co-host for an episode of Season 14 of Roger Ebert & the Movies. She appeared on a February 2004 episode of Who Wants to Be a Super Millionaire as part of the first "Three Wise Men" panel to support the wrong answer option. She had multiple appearances on Charlie Rose to discuss recent movie releases.

Schwarzbaum is featured in the 2009 documentary For the Love of Movies: The Story of American Film Criticism describing the importance and impact of two women critics, Molly Haskell and Janet Maslin.

In early 2015, Schwarzbaum was selected for Amtrak's inaugural writing residency program, in which she produced blog posts on her cross-country travel and wrote about her father for Tablet.

In her final column for Entertainment Weekly in 2013, she wrote:

I've spent 22 years at Entertainment Weekly, 19 of them as a critic—a glorious tenure that ends this week. [...] I once received an effing cool email from Josh Brolin telling me, and I quote, "You can f---ing write!" and promising to be in my movie. Not that I have any plans whatsoever to write a screenplay [...] (my plans include a book, an online project, speaking engagements about popular culture—oh, and a dog!)
