= Paul Solman =

American economist

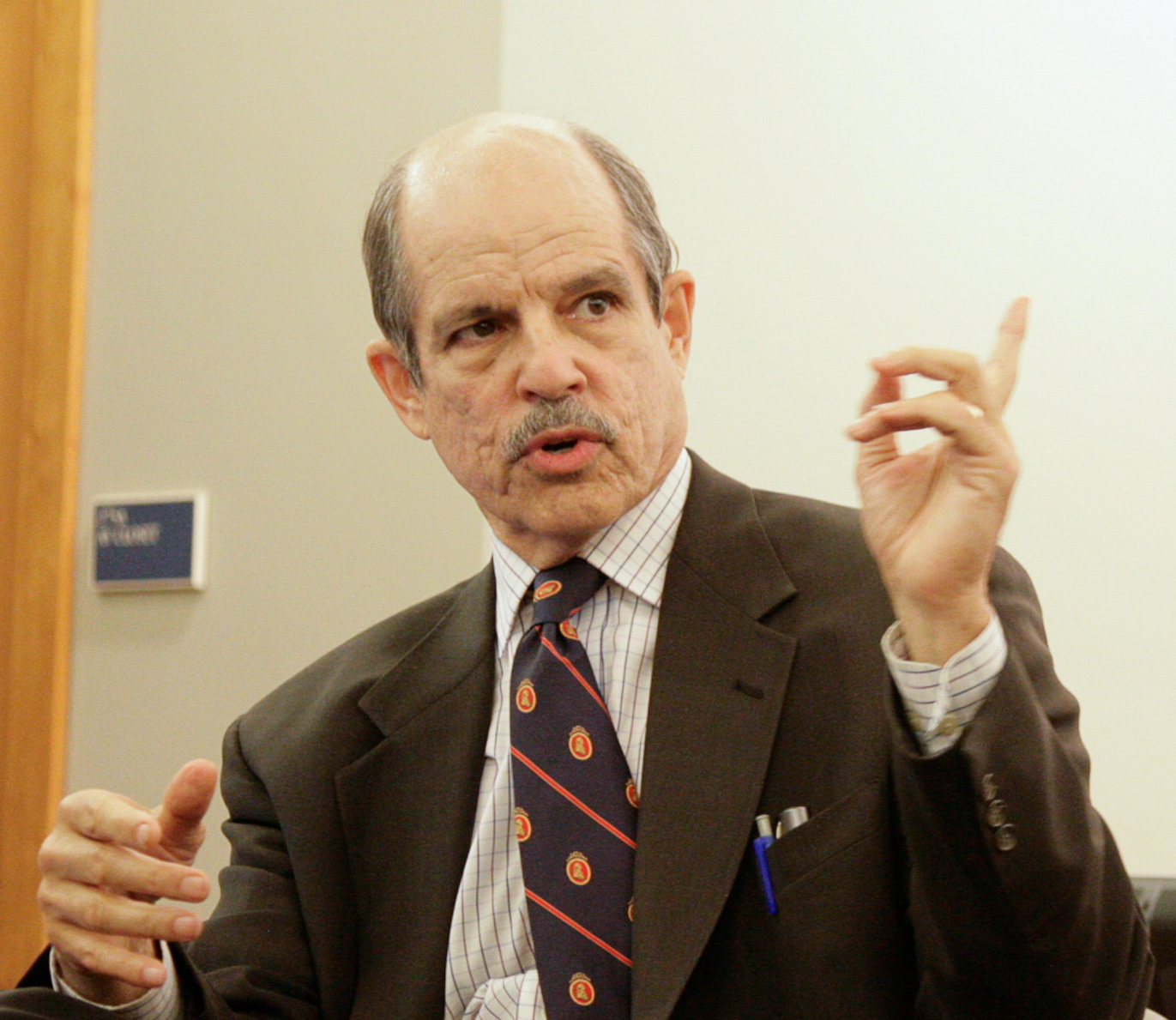
- Solman in 2009
- Born: September 9, 1944 (age 82); New York City, U.S.
- Education: Brandeis University
- Employer: PBS NewsHour

Paul Solman is an American journalist focused on economics, business, and politics since the early 1970s. He has been the business and economics correspondent for the PBS NewsHour since 1985, with occasional forays into art reporting.

His work has been recognized with eight Emmys, five Peabodys, a Loeb award, and a James Beard award for media.

== Career ==
Solman began his career in business journalism as a Nieman Fellow, studying at Harvard Business School. A 1966 graduate of Brandeis University, where he edited the weekly newspaper, he was the founding editor of the alternative Boston weekly The Real Paper in 1972. He was the East Coast Editor of Mother Jones magazine in the late 1970s.

He co-authored, with longtime PBS executive and writer Thomas Friedman, Life and Death on the Corporate Battlefield in 1983. He joined The MacNeil/Lehrer NewsHour (now The PBS NewsHour) in 1985. Solman taught at the Harvard Business School from 1985 to 1987.

In 1994, with his professor at Brandeis, sociologist Morrie Schwartz, he helped create—and wrote the introduction to—the book Morrie: In His Own Words, which preceded Tuesdays with Morrie but failed to outsell it by several orders of magnitude.

From 2007 to 2016, he was a faculty member at Yale University's International Security Studies program, teaching in its "Grand Strategy" course. He also lectured for years at the Yale Young Global Scholars program, the Warrior-Scholar program at Yale, has taught at West Point, among many universities, and was the Richman Distinguished Visiting professor at Brandeis in 2011. He has also taught economics at Gateway Community College in New Haven, Connecticut, where he founded the Yale@Gateway speaker series.

Solman co-produced, with Bob Burns, and presented a series of companion videos to McGraw-Hill economics textbooks.

His 2015 book Get What's Yours: The Secrets to Maxing Out Your Social Security, a collaboration with economist Laurence Kotlikoff and author Philip Moeller, was a bona fide bestseller; the book was reissued in May 2016 due to changes in Social Security regulations.

Solman was a visiting fellow at Mansfield College, Oxford University in 2016.

With his former Yale student David McCullough III and longtime Harvard professor Robert Glauber, Solman created American Exchange Project in 2019, a nonpolitical nonprofit domestic "foreign exchange" program that introduces high school seniors from everywhere in America to each other and sends and embeds them, for free, in communities utterly unlike their own. Solman chairs the board and is an active recruiter of communities and support.

== Personal life ==
Solman is married to Jan Freeman, a former language columnist for The Boston Globe. He has two adult daughters and seven grandchildren.

His father Joseph Solman was a painter and co-founder of The Ten art movement.

== Awards (partial) ==
- Emmys (1978, 1982, 1984 (2), 1998, 2005, 2007, 2009)
- Peabody Awards (1987, 2004, 2019, 2020, 2022)
- Gerald Loeb Award for Television business journalism: "China Rising" (2006)
- James Beard Foundation Award (2018)
