= BostonNOW =

Discontinued free daily newspaper

- Type: Free daily
- Format: Tabloid
- Founder: Russel Pergament
- Publisher: Michael E. Schroeder
- Editor: Mitch Lipka and Ann Kennedy
- Founded: 2007
- Headquarters: 30 Winter St. Boston, MA 02108; United States
- Website: BostonNOW.com

BostonNOW is a discontinued free daily newspaper that was distributed in Boston, combining both traditional and web journalism.

BostonNOW offered information in print, online and mobile. The newspaper was targeted towards commuters rather than residences; it was widely distributed at key MBTA subway stations. The tabloid held daily polls, contests, and a "Treasure Hunt" contest, and relied heavily on bloggers for content.

The newspaper's main competition was the similarly distributed Boston Metro.

== History ==
Newspaper publisher Russel Pergament returned to Boston and launched Boston Now as a free daily newspaper backed by Icelandic conglomerate Dagsbrun on April 17, 2007. Pergament described Boston Now as breaking news in addition to carrying news wire content. Pergament shut down Boston Now on April 14, 2008, due to tumult in foreign credit markets.
