= American Exchange Project =

American exchange program organization

- Formation: 2019; 7 years ago
- Headquarters: Boston, Massachusetts
- Website: https://www.americanexchangeproject.org/

American Exchange Project is a nonprofit 501(c)(3) organization founded in 2019 by Paul Solman, Robert R. Glauber, and David McCullough III. It is based in Boston, Massachusetts. The organization facilitates domestic exchange programs within the United States for high school seniors, allowing them to spend time in parts of the country they are unfamiliar with. Since its founding, American Exchange Project has organized nearly 1,000 trips across 40 states.

== History ==
American Exchange Project was founded after a road trip David McCullough III, then a rising senior at Yale University, took in 2016 as part of Yale's Program in Grand Strategy. After visiting Texas, South Dakota, and Ohio, McCullough, who had grown up in Massachusetts, began a research project on inequality in the United States before founding American Exchange Project. American Exchange Project was founded out of his desire to "stitch our divided country back together." In its first exchange in 2021, 11 high school seniors from Wellesley, Massachusetts and Palo Alto, California visited Kilgore, Texas and Lake Charles, Louisiana. By 2024, the program had partnered with 53 high schools in 31 states, arranging trips for more than 400 students. The organization is nonpartisan.

The program takes students from member high schools and sends them each to a different part of the country distinct from their hometown. The students visit their host city for a week along with students from around the United States and participate in activities unique to the city and broader region. They then host students from around the country in their own hometown. Participating high schools are based in cities including Anchorage, Dodge City, Gloucester, Massachusetts, and Washington, D.C.

== Organization ==
American Exchange Project runs on philanthropic donations. Since its founding, it has received backing from Steven Spielberg's Hearthland Foundation, the MacArthur Foundation, the Bezos Family Foundation, and the Carnegie Corporation of New York. Its board includes Akhil Reed Amar, Arlie Hochschild, Paul Solman, and Jonathan Fanton. The program has partnered with psychologists at Harvard University to study its long-term impact.
