= Orson Welles Cinema =

Former movie theater in Cambridge, Massachusetts, United States

Coordinates: 42°22′11″N 71°6′41″W

The Gods Must Be Crazy (1980) was one of the films at the Orson Welles Cinema.

The Orson Welles Cinema was a movie theater at 1001 Massachusetts Avenue in Cambridge, Massachusetts that operated from 1969 to 1986. Showcasing independents, foreign films and revivals, it became a focal point of the Boston-Cambridge film community.

== History ==
Ad in The Real Paper (June 13, 1973). Note the premiere of Ilene H. Lang's short about famed Cambridge photographer Elsa Dorfman, At Home, Elsa Dorfman (1973), with Allen Ginsberg and Peter Orlovsky.

Originally the Esquire Theater in the early 1960s, it became the Orson Welles Cinema under its next owner, folk musician Dean Gitter. It was programmed by then-Harvard Law student Peter Jaszi.

The Orson Welles Cinema opened under that name on April 8, 1969, with Luis Buñuel’s Simon of the Desert, Orson Welles’ The Immortal Story and a midnight movie, Don Siegel’s Invasion of the Body Snatchers.

On September 29, 1970, the cinema was raided by Massachusetts State Police for showing Oh! Calcutta! on video. Gitter, Jaszi, and Ted Uzzle, among others, were arrested, and spent the night in the Cambridge jail. The case would later be laughed out of court.

When Gitter departed, the new owners were Molly and Ralph P. Hoagland III (previously a co-founder of the CVS Corporation). From 1971 to 1978 the theater was managed and programmed by Larry Jackson, who later held positions with Miramax, Orion Pictures and the Samuel Goldwyn Company. The theater was purchased by Herbert and Philip Meadow and managed by Phil Meadow through the early and mid-1980s.

In 1972–73, the Orson Welles Cinema expanded with two smaller screening rooms in addition to the main 400-seat auditorium. Jackson, who worked with Gary Graver and Welles on The Other Side of the Wind, succeeded in getting Welles to visit the cinema named in his honor. Welles and his cameraman Graver used the occasion—the premiere of F For Fake on January 7, 1977—to shoot footage inside the large auditorium for their documentary Filming Othello (1978). In March 2006, Jackson staged a showing of rare footage by Orson Welles in Northampton, Massachusetts.

Ancillary operations included the Orson Welles Film School, a photo shop, a record store, a bookstore and The Restaurant at the Orson Welles, aka the Orson Welles Restaurant. At first, it was famous for requiring strangers sitting at the same table to order the same meal. The chef was Odette J. Bery, who later wrote Another Season Cookbook: Recipes for Every Season from the Chef/Owner of Boston’s Another Season Restaurant (Globe Pequot, 1986). In his autobiography, comedian Jay Leno notes that he performed in the Orson Welles Restaurant during his early days as a stand-up comic. After the Welles Restaurant closed, the two-level space became Chi-Chi's, part of the Mexican restaurant chain.

The Orson Welles Cinema came to an end with fire caused by a popcorn maker at 2 pm on Saturday, May 24, 1986. The last three films shown were Henry Jaglom’s Always, Dick Clement’s Water and Dennis Potter’s Dreamchild.

== Operations ==
Vintage Hitchcock is a 13" x 18" poster designed by Jean Fogle for a month-long Alfred Hitchcock series held in 1973 at the Orson Welles Cinema in Cambridge, Massachusetts.

The Orson Welles Cinema's advertising and promotion were under the direction of John Fogle, with ad and poster copy written by Fogle and Larry Jackson. The Welles Cinema's posters were designed by Jean Fogle. Extra runs of these posters were sold in the lobby. Among Fogle's outstanding creations was Vintage Hitchcock, a 13" x 18" poster she designed for a month-long Hitchcock series held in 1973.

Film notes for each showing were prepared by staffer John Rossi, who for each film gathered lengthy cast and crew credits, a partial synopsis and selected film reviews. These were prepared in the upstairs offices of the complex, as was the black-and-white digest-sized Orson Welles Cinema Magazine.

== Science Fiction Film Marathon ==
In February 1976, the Welles launched its 24-hour Science Fiction Film Marathon with The Day of the Triffids, The Day the Earth Stood Still, Earth vs. the Flying Saucers, Fantastic Voyage, Five Million Years to Earth, The Incredible Shrinking Man, Invasion of the Body Snatchers (1956), It Came from Outer Space, Them!, The Thing from Another World (1951), The Shape of Things to Come, This Island Earth, The War of the Worlds, and Zardoz.

The Marathon became an annual event that continued even after the Orson Welles Cinema closed. Following the 11 Marathons held at the Orson Welles, the film series moved on to other Boston theaters, and under the name Boston Science Fiction Film Festival it is now held annually on President's Day weekend at the Somerville Theatre in Davis Square, Somerville.

== First Boston Film Festival ==
Less successful was the Welles’ Boston Film Festival (1976), which included such films as Monty Python's Flying Circus, And Now For Something Completely Different and Jacques Rivette’s Out One: Spectre. However, according to Welles Cinema staffers, many of the announced films arrived late or never appeared.

== Legacy ==
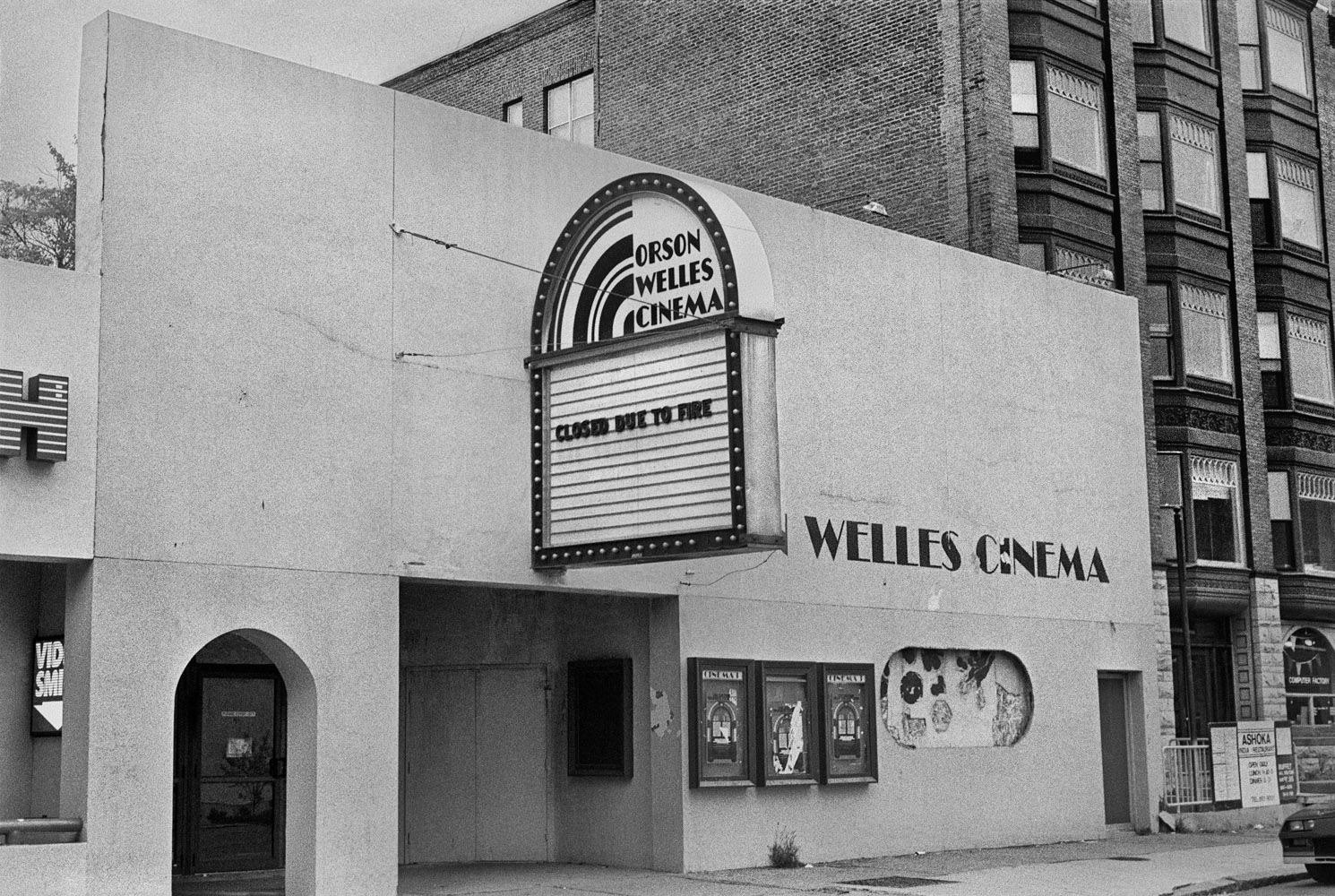
The Orson Welles Cinema on Massachusetts Avenue a few days after a fire that reportedly started in a popcorn machine caused it to close in May 1986

Film personalities associated with the Orson Welles Cinema include the first house manager, future actor Tommy Lee Jones, during the spring of his senior year at nearby Harvard University. Producer-screenwriter John Semper (Class Act, Spider-Man) was an employee, as was the Brazilian film composer Pancho Sáenz, future writer-director Martha Pinson and future sound editor David E. Stone.

The career of writer-producer Fred Barron began in 1975 when he used the history of Cambridge's The Real Paper as the basis for a screenplay, Between the Lines. When Joan Micklin Silver brought Hester Street (1975) to the Welles Cinema, she was joined at the Welles Restaurant by Barron and others. When someone asked what she would direct next, she answered that she was looking at screenplays. Barron stood up, left the restaurant and returned with his screenplay. The success of Between the Lines (1977) led to a short-lived television series, also titled Between the Lines.

On January 2, 1975, Nicholas Ray appeared at the Welles for a Q&A session after the showing of the David Helpern documentary, I’m a Stranger Here Myself. Other filmmakers and musicians who made personal appearances or visited at the Welles Cinema included Orson Welles himself, Peter Bogdanovich, Edward Dmytryk, Ed Emshwiller, Jean Eustache, Gary Graver, Jean-Pierre Léaud, Jim McBride, Vincente Minnelli, George A. Romero, Harold Russell, François Truffaut and Neil Young. After Steven Lisberger premiered his Cosmic Cartoon (1973) at the Welles, the animated short received a Student Academy Award nomination, and he went on to make Animalympics and Tron. Rob Morris, former film intern, busboy, and waiter (for the restaurant next door) started a two-man company that created the first commercial multimedia computer system in the mid-1980s.
