= James S. Doyle =

American journalist (born c. 1935)

- Born: 1935
- Occupation(s): Journalist, activist

James S. Doyle (born c. 1935) is an American journalist and activist.

== History ==
Prior to attending college, he worked for the State House News Service on Beacon Hill. He graduated from Boston College in 1956, and the Columbia University Graduate School of Journalism (with honors) in 1961. He was a 1965 Society of Nieman Fellows awardee at Harvard University.

Doyle retired in 1998, then supervised the Committee of Concerned Journalists study "The Clinton/Lewinsky Story: How Accurate? How Fair?"
