= David Tannor =

Theoretical chemist

- דוד טנור
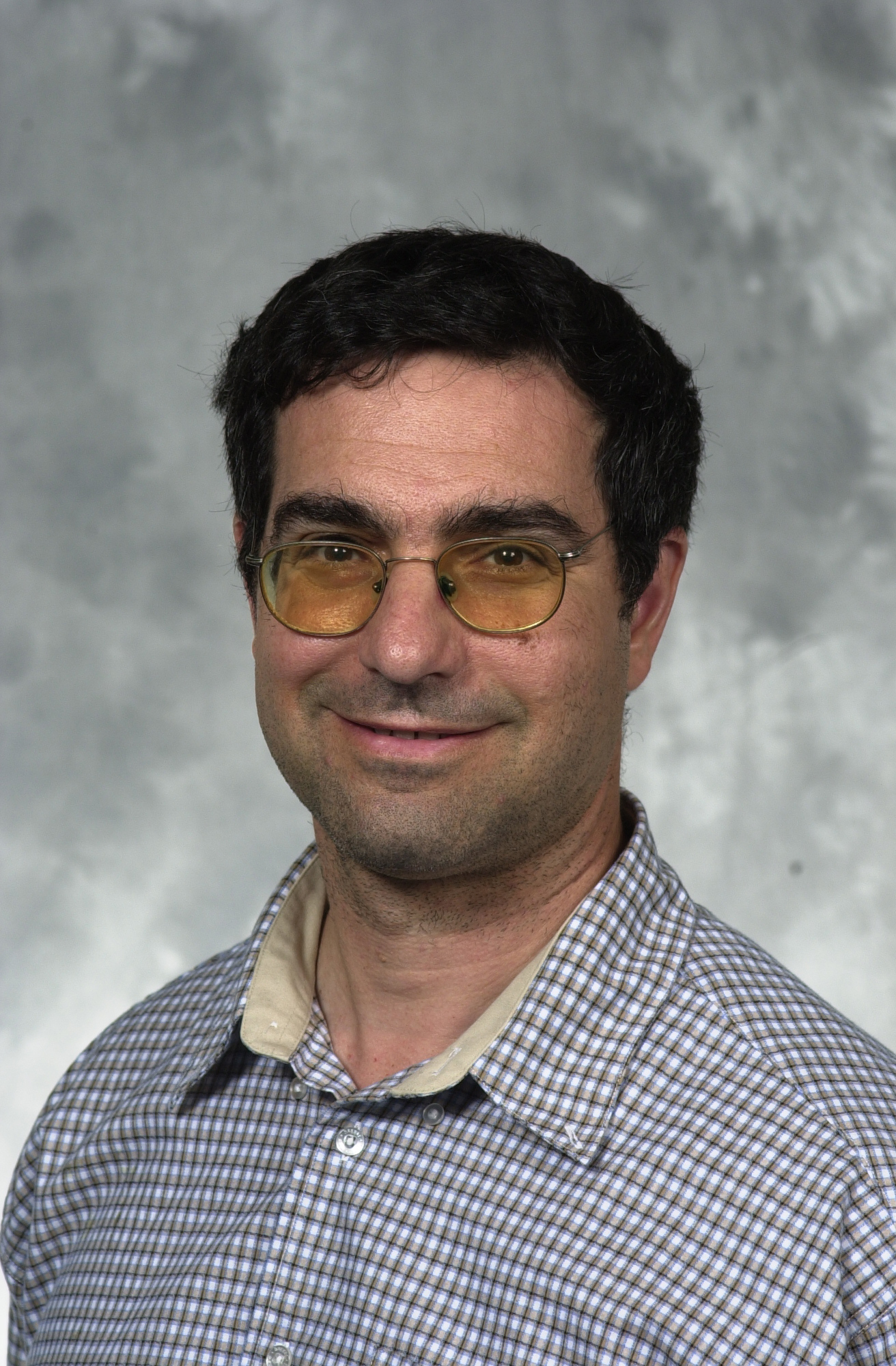
- David Tannor
- Born: David Joshua Tannor; 1958 (age 67–68)
- Education: Columbia (BA, 1978); UCLA (PhD, 1983)
- Occupation: Theoretical chemist
- Employer: Weizmann Institute of Science
- Title: Hermann Mayer Professorial Chair in the Department of Chemical Physics

David Joshua Tannor (Hebrew: דוד טנור; born 1958) is a theoretical chemist, who is the Hermann Mayer Professorial Chair in the department of chemical physics at the Weizmann Institute of Science.

== Biography ==
Tannor has a BA from Columbia University (1978), and a PhD with Eric Heller from UCLA (1983). He did his post-doc work with Stuart Rice and David W. Oxtoby at the University of Chicago. He is a black belt in karate.

Tannor is a theoretical chemist. He studies the effects of quantum mechanics on how molecules move. He worked from 1986 to 1989 as an assistant professor at the Illinois Institute of Technology in Chicago, from 1989 to 1995 as an assistant and associate professor at the University of Notre Dame in South Bend, Indiana, from 1992 to 1993 as a visiting professor at Columbia University, and from 1995 to 2000 as an associate professor and since 2000 as a professor at the Weizmann Institute of Science in Rehovot, Israel.

He is the Hermann Mayer Professorial Chair in the department of chemical physics at the Weizmann Institute of Science.

Tannor is the author of Introduction to Quantum Mechanics (2007). He has also published or co-published over 120 scientific articles and reviews.
