= Leslie Berlowitz =

United States educator and educational administrator (1944-2020)

Leslie Cohen Berlowitz (née Leslie Ruth Cohen, formerly Tuttleton (March 1, 1944 – June 13, 2020) was president and chief executive officer of the American Academy of Arts and Sciences. Berlowitz became the academy's executive officer in 1996 and was later promoted to chief executive officer and President. From 1969 to 1996, Berlowitz was an administrator at New York University. In 2013, The Boston Globe pointed to a falsification of her degree on Academy grant applications and that her Academy salary appeared higher than standards at comparable institutions. The Globe also brought her management style into question.

== Education ==
Cohen graduated from the Fieldston School, and received a bachelor's degree from New York University and a master's degree from Columbia University. She was named an honorary Doctor of Humane Letters by Northeastern University in May 2011.

== American Academy leadership ==
As chief executive, Berlowitz won praise for increasing Academy revenues, expanding the scope of programs, and raising the academy's national profile, though questions about her management style and allegedly poor treatment of employees followed her for years. Berlowitz led the academy's Strategic Plan "2001 and Beyond" and the development of the Initiative for the Humanities and its Humanities Indicators.

She created a network of more than 50 University Affiliates to work with the academy on issues vital to the higher education community and also established two residential fellowship programs for young scholars: the Visiting Scholars Program and the Hellman Fellowship in Science and Technology Policy.

=== Resignation ===
In June 2013, Berlowitz was accused by the Boston Globe of lying on her résumé in the course of writing grant proposals for the American Academy, falsely claiming to have earned a PhD degree in English from New York University. Berlowitz was also accused of drawing excessive compensation and manipulating the academy's election process. Following calls by the Washington Post and the Boston Globe for her resignation, Berlowitz resigned her position in July 2013. In the wake of press attacks on Berlowitz, former Ambassador to Afghanistan and U.S. Army Lt. General Karl Eikenberry and former Tennessee Governor Phil Bredesen wrote to the Boston Globe in her support.

== Personal life ==
Leslie Ruth Cohen was born on March 1, 1944, in Manhattan, New York City, New York.

On April 20, 1970, The New York Times announced the marriage one day earlier of Leslie Ruth Cohen and James W. Tuttleton, an instructor at New York University. The union produced at least one child, a daughter, Sarah. In 1978, Leslie married Lawrence Berlowitz.

== Bibliography ==
She co-edited three books: Restoring Trust in American Business (Cambridge: MIT Press, 2005; with Jay W. Lorsch and Andy Zelleke), America in Theory (New York: Oxford University Press, 1988; with Denis Donoghue and Louis Menand), and Greenwich Village: Culture and Counterculture (Rutgers University Press, 1990; with Richard Eric Beard).
