= American Academy of Arts and Sciences =

US honorary society and policy research center

The American Academy of Arts and Sciences
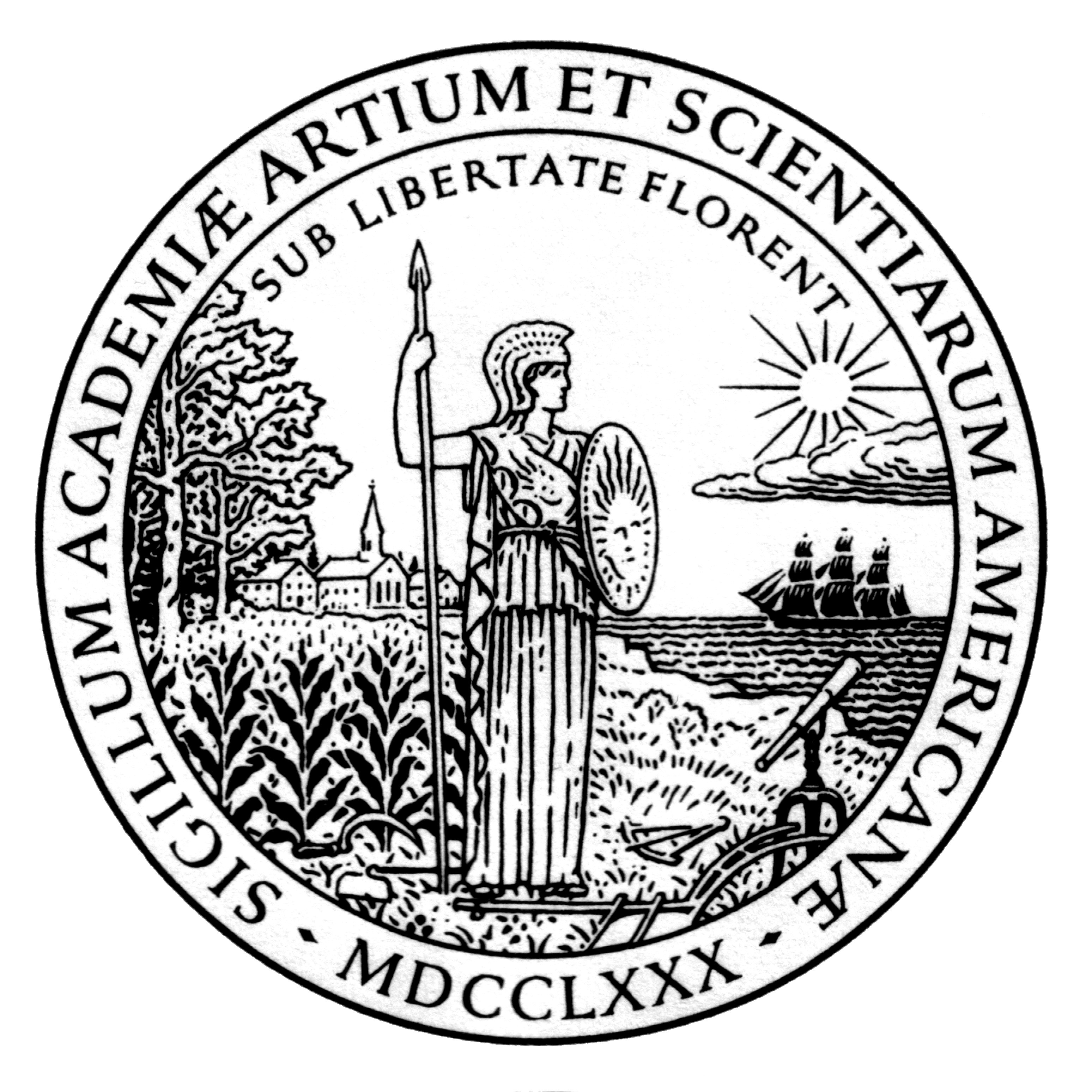
- Abbreviation: The American Academy; The Academy
- Formation: May 4, 1780; 246 years ago
- Type: Honorary society and independent research center
- Headquarters: Cambridge, Massachusetts, U.S.
- Coordinates: 42°22′51″N 71°6′37″W
- Members: 5,700+ active members
- President: Laurie L. Patton
- Subsidiaries: Daedalus
- Website: www.amacad.org

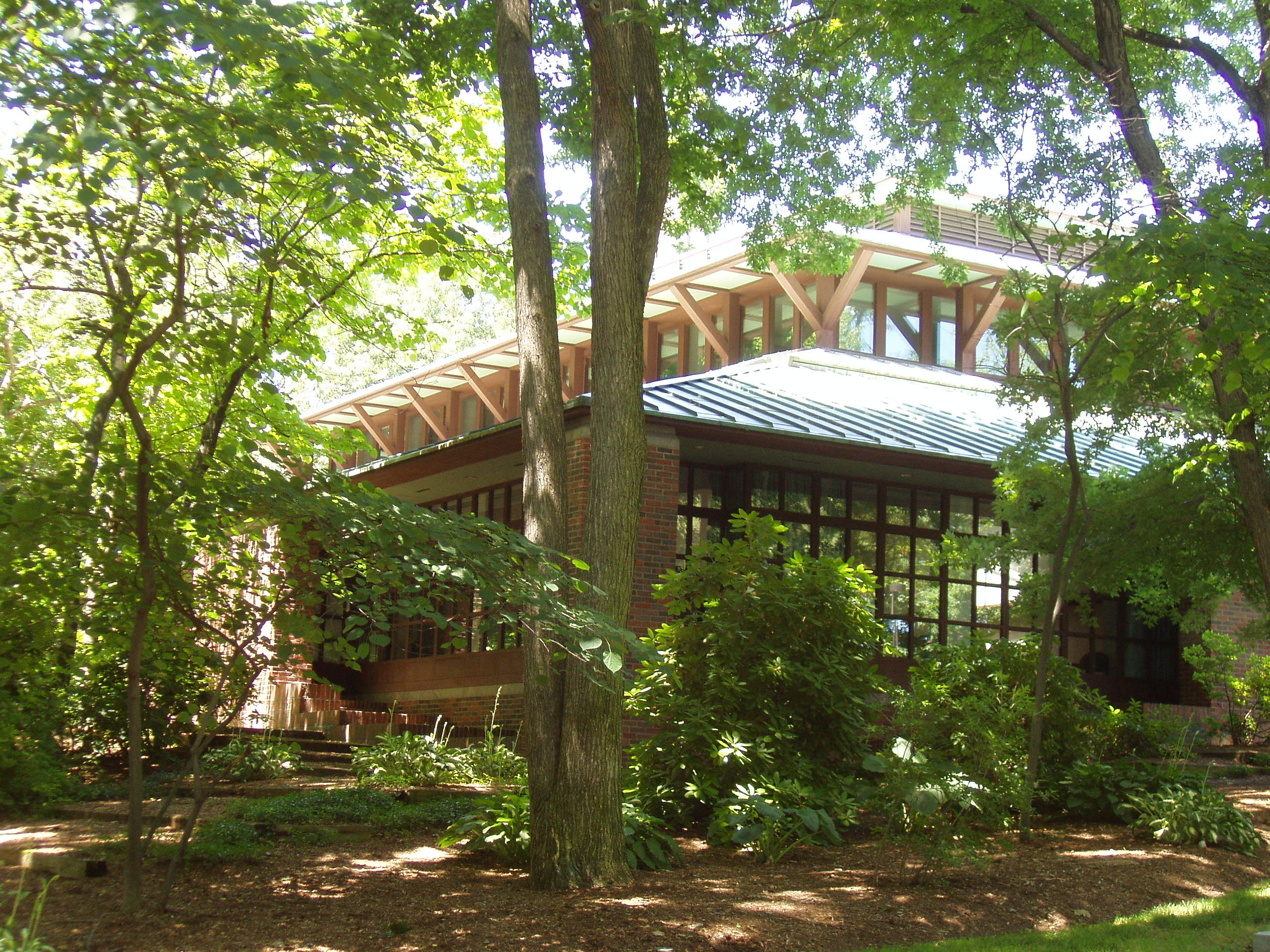
The House of the Academy, Cambridge, Massachusetts

The American Academy of Arts and Sciences (The Academy) is one of the oldest learned societies in the United States. It was founded in 1780 during the American Revolution by John Adams, John Hancock, James Bowdoin, Andrew Oliver, and other Founding Fathers of the United States. It is headquartered in Cambridge, Massachusetts.

Membership in the academy is achieved through a nominating petition, review, and election process. The academy's quarterly journal, Dædalus, is published by the MIT Press on behalf of the academy, and has been open-access since January 2021. The academy also conducts multidisciplinary public policy research.

Laurie L. Patton has served as President of the Academy since January 2025.

== History ==
The Academy was established by the Massachusetts legislature on May 4, 1780, charted in order "to cultivate every art and science which may tend to advance the interest, honor, dignity, and happiness of a free, independent, and virtuous people." The sixty-two incorporating fellows represented varying interests and high standing in the political, professional, and commercial sectors of the state. The first class of new members, chosen by the Academy in 1781, included Benjamin Franklin and George Washington as well as several international honorary members. The initial volume of Academy Memoirs appeared in 1785, and the Proceedings followed in 1846. In the 1950s, the Academy launched its journal Daedalus, reflecting its commitment to a broader intellectual and socially-oriented program.

Since the second half of the twentieth century, independent research has become a central focus of the Academy. In the late 1950s, arms control emerged as one of its signature concerns. The Academy also served as the catalyst in establishing the National Humanities Center in North Carolina. In the late 1990s, the Academy developed a new strategic plan, focusing on four major areas: science, technology, and global security; social policy and education; humanities and culture; and education. In 2002, the Academy established a visiting scholars program in association with Harvard University. More than 75 academic institutions from across the country have become Affiliates of the Academy to support this program and other Academy initiatives.

The Academy has sponsored a number of awards and prizes, throughout its history and has offered opportunities for fellowships and visiting scholars at the Academy.

In July 2013, The Boston Globe exposed then president Leslie Berlowitz for falsifying her credentials, faking a doctorate, and consistently mistreating her staff. Berlowitz subsequently resigned.

== Projects ==
=== The Humanities Indicators ===
A project of the Academy that equips researchers, policymakers, universities, foundations, museums, libraries, humanities councils, and other public institutions with statistical tools for answering basic questions about primary and secondary humanities education, undergraduate and graduate education in the humanities, the humanities workforce, levels and sources of program funding, public understanding and impact of the humanities, and other areas of concern in the humanities community. It is modeled on the Science and Engineering Indicators, published biennially by the National Science Board as required by Congress.

== Membership ==
=== Founding members ===
The following were charter members of the Academy:

- John Adams
- Samuel Adams
- John Bacon
- James Bowdoin
- Charles Chauncy
- John Clarke
- David Cobb
- Samuel Cooper
- Nathan Cushing
- Thomas Cushing
- William Cushing
- Tristram Dalton
- Francis Dana
- Samuel Deane
- Perez Fobes
- Caleb Gannett
- Henry Gardner
- Benjamin Guild
- John Hancock
- Joseph Hawley
- Edward Augustus Holyoke
- Ebenezer Hunt
- Jonathan Jackson
- Charles Jarvis
- Samuel Langdon
- Levi Lincoln
- Daniel Little
- Elijah Lothrup
- John Lowell
- Samuel Mather
- Samuel Moody
- Andrew Oliver
- Joseph Orne
- Theodore Parsons
- George Partridge
- Robert Treat Paine
- Phillips Payson
- Samuel Phillips
- John Pickering
- Oliver Prescott
- Zedekiah Sanger
- Nathaniel Peaslee Sargeant
- Micajah Sawyer
- Theodore Sedgwick
- William Sever
- David Sewall
- Stephen Sewall
- John Sprague
- Ebenezer Storer
- Caleb Strong
- James Sullivan
- John Bernard Sweat
- Nathaniel Tracy
- Cotton Tufts
- James Warren
- Samuel West
- Edward Wigglesworth
- Joseph Willard
- Abraham Williams
- Nehemiah Williams
- Samuel Williams
- James Winthrop

=== Notable Members ===
Ever since the founding of the Academy, its members have been nominated and elected by peers. Members of the Academy included not only scientists and scholars, but also writers and artists as well as representatives from the full range of professions and public life. Throughout the Academy's history, more than 10,000 fellows have been elected. Notable members include:

- John James Audubon
- Sissela Bok
- Willa Cather
- T. S. Eliot
- Duke Ellington
- Josiah Willard Gibbs
- Joseph Henry
- Washington Irving
- Thomas Jefferson
- Edward R. Murrow
- Martha Nussbaum
- J. Robert Oppenheimer
- Augustus Saint-Gaudens
- Jonas Salk
- Eudora Welty

The Academy has also had multiple international honorary members, including:

- Jose Antonio Pantoja Hernandez
- Albert Einstein
- Leonhard Euler
- Marquis de Lafayette
- Alexander von Humboldt
- Leopold von Ranke
- Charles Darwin
- Carl Friedrich Gauss
- Otto Hahn
- Jawaharlal Nehru
- Pablo Picasso
- Liu Guosong
- Lucian Michael Freud
- Luis Buñuel
- Galina Ulanova
- Werner Heisenberg
- Alec Guinness
- Ngozi Okonjo-Iweala
- Menahem Yaari
- Yitzhak Apeloig
- Zvi Galil
- Haim Harari
- Sebastião Salgado

Astronomer Maria Mitchell was the first woman elected to the Academy, in 1848.

The current membership encompasses over 5,700 members based across the United States and around the world. Academy members include more than 250 Nobel laureates and more than 60 Pulitzer Prize winners.

Of the Academy's 14,343 members since 1780, 1,406 are or have been affiliated with Harvard University, 611 with the Massachusetts Institute of Technology, 433 with Yale University, 425 with the University of California, Berkeley, and 404 with Stanford University. The following table includes those institutions affiliated with 300 or more members.

Institution	Members (1780–2021)
Harvard	1,406
MIT	611
Yale	433
Berkeley	425
Stanford	404
Chicago	367
Columbia	344
Princeton	322

† Excludes members affiliated exclusively with associated national laboratories.

=== Classes and specialties ===
As of 2023, membership is divided into five classes and thirty specialties.

Class I – Mathematical and physical sciences

- Section 1. Mathematics, applied mathematics, and statistics
- Section 2. Physics
- Section 3. Chemistry
- Section 4. Astronomy, astrophysics, and earth sciences
- Section 5. Engineering and technologies
- Section 6. Computer sciences

Class II – Biological sciences

- Section 1. Biochemistry, biophysics, and molecular biology
- Section 2. Cellular and developmental biology
- Section 3. Neurosciences
- Section 4. Evolution and ecology
- Section 5. Medical sciences

Class III – Social and behavioral sciences

- Section 1. Psychological sciences
- Section 2. Economics
- Section 3. Political science
- Section 4. Law
- Section 5. Archaeology and anthropology
- Section 6. Sociology, demography, and geography
- Section 7. Education

Class IV – Arts and humanities

- Section 1. Philosophy
- Section 2. History
- Section 3. Literature and language studies
- Section 4. Literature
- Section 5. Visual arts
- Section 6. Performing arts
- Section 7. Religious studies

Class V – Public affairs, business, and administration

- Section 1. Journalism, media, and communications
- Section 2. Business, corporate, and philanthropic leadership
- Section 3. Educational and academic leadership
- Section 4. Public affairs and public policy
- Section 5. Scientific, cultural, and nonprofit leadership

== Presidents, 1780–present ==
- 1780–1790 James Bowdoin
- 1791–1814 John Adams
- 1814–1820 Edward Augustus Holyoke
- 1820–1829 John Quincy Adams
- 1829–1838 Nathaniel Bowditch
- 1838–1839 James Jackson, M.D.
- 1839–1846 John Pickering
- 1846–1863 Jacob Bigelow
- 1863–1873 Asa Gray
- 1873–1880 Charles Francis Adams
- 1880–1892 Joseph Lovering
- 1892–1894 Josiah Parsons Cooke
- 1894–1903 Alexander Agassiz
- 1903–1908 William Watson Goodwin
- 1908–1915 John Trowbridge
- 1915–1917 Henry Pickering Walcott
- 1917–1919 Charles Pickering Bowditch
- 1919–1921 Theodore William Richards
- 1921–1924 George Foot Moore
- 1924–1927 Theodore Lyman
- 1927–1931 Edwin Bidwell Wilson
- 1931–1933 Jeremiah D. M. Ford
- 1933–1935 George Howard Parker
- 1935–1937 Roscoe Pound
- 1937–1939 Dugald C. Jackson
- 1939–1944 Harlow Shapley
- 1944–1951 Howard Mumford Jones
- 1951–1954 Edwin Herbert Land
- 1954–1957 John Ely Burchard
- 1957–1961 Kirtley Fletcher Mather
- 1961–1964 Hudson Hoagland
- 1964–1967 Paul A. Freund
- 1967–1971 Talcott Parsons
- 1971–1976 Harvey Brooks
- 1976–1979 Victor Frederick Weisskopf
- 1979–1982 Milton Katz
- 1982–1986 Herman Feshbach
- 1986–1989 Edward Hirsch Levi
- 1989–1994 Leo Beranek
- 1994–1997 Jaroslav Pelikan
- 1997–2000 Daniel C. Tosteson
- 2000–2001 James O. Freedman
- 2001–2006 Patricia Meyer Spacks
- 2006–2009 Emilio Bizzi
- 2010–2013 Leslie C. Berlowitz
- 2014–2018 Jonathan Fanton
- 2019–2024 David W. Oxtoby
- 2025–Present Laurie L. Patton

== See also ==
- American Philosophical Society
- National Academy of Engineering
- National Academy of Medicine (formerly the Institute of Medicine)
- National Academy of Sciences
- List of American Academy of Arts and Sciences members
