= Russel Pergament =

American journalist and publisher

- Occupations: Newspaper publisher, journalist
- Notable work: Jerusalem News Syndicate

Russel Pergament is a journalist and newspaper publisher. He is considered an early pioneer of free newspapers, founding or publishing The Tabs, Metro Boston, and Boston Now in the Boston area, and amNew York in New York City. He is also a publisher of the Jerusalem News Syndicate (JNS), formerly known as the Jewish News Syndicate.

== Career ==
Pergament started his career as a stockbroker, then had stints at two Boston weeklies and The Boston Herald.

He entered the publishing business as co-publisher of The Tabs in 1979 with two partners, Dick Yousoufian and Stephen Cummings, and a $10,000 investment. The Tabs were a group of 14 free-distribution community newspapers that included The Weekly Tab serving the suburban areas west of Boston. In his publisher's column in The Weekly Tab, Pergament frequently railed against the biases of The Boston Globe. In response to the financial success of The Tabs, which earned $12 million in annual revenue by 1989, the Globe launched its own weekly section aimed at the same demographic. The Tabs were among several free publications across the United States that pressured the respective traditional paid newspaper operators in their markets.

The Tabs launched Metro Boston, a free daily newspaper, which published from 2001 to 2020, with Pergament as publisher.

Pergament moved into New York City's ultracompetitive newspaper market in the early 2000s, a move Time called "admirable in its audacity", by focusing on the 18-to-34 segment of the population that traditionally did not read newspapers and wanted content that was "fast, blather free and unbiased" according to Pergament. He launched the free daily newspaper amNew York, published by the Tribune Co. in the fall of 2003, which grew quickly to a circulation of 290,000 by May 2004. The launch of amNew York was part of a broader effort across the United States to revive the moribund newspaper industry after a decade of eroding readership and declining business.

In February 2007, Pergament returned to Boston and launched free daily newspaper Boston Now, backed by Icelandic conglomerate Dagsbrun. Pergament described Boston Now as breaking news in addition to carrying news wire content. Pergament shut down Boston Now in 2008 due to tumult in foreign credit markets.

In September 2011, Pergament launched and published the Jewish News Syndicate (JNS) to compete with the Jewish Telegraphic Agency as the Associated Press of the Jewish media. By 2013, JNS was growing quicker and provided news wire content to approximately 40 newspapers.
