= Tab Communications =

Defunct newspaper publisher

Tab Communications Inc.
- Industry: Newspapers
- Founded: 1979
- Defunct: January 11, 1996
- Fate: Bought, then dissolved
- Successor: Community Newspaper Company
- Headquarters: 254 Second Avenue, Needham, Massachusetts 02494 United States
- Key people: Tab's three founders: Russel Pergament, CEO; Dick Yousoufian, president Stephen Cummings, publisher From NewsWest merger: James F. Carlin, Tab chairman James Kerasiotes, Tab director
- Products: Weekly newspapers in Boston and several western suburbs
- Parent: Independent, 1979–1992; Fidelity Investments, 1992–1996

Tab Communications Inc. (also called Tabloid Newspaper Publishers), based first in Newton, Massachusetts, United States, then in nearby Needham, was a weekly newspaper publisher in Greater Boston before being bought by Fidelity Investments in 1992 and dissolved into Community Newspaper Company in 1996.

The company, founded in 1979, steadily expanded from one newspaper to 14 and made one major acquisition, buying its competitor NewsWest in 1989. Most of the Tabs are published by GateHouse Media, who bought CNC in 2006, and are still named after their tabloid format, although they are now broadsheets.

== History ==
Russel Pergament, Dick Yousoufian, and Stephen Cummings launched The Tabs in 1979 with two partners, Dick Yousoufian and Stephen Cummings, and a $10,000 investment. The Tabs grew to a group of 14 free-distribution community newspapers that included The Weekly Tab serving the suburban areas west of Boston. In his publisher's column in The Weekly Tab, Pergament frequently railed against the biases of The Boston Globe. In response to the financial success of The Tabs, which earned $12 million in annual revenue by 1989, the Globe launched its own weekly section aimed at the same demographic. The Tabs were among several free publications across the United States that pressured the respective traditional paid newspaper operators in their markets.

Three alternative weekly advertising representatives formed their own company in 1979, publishing the Brookline Tab and Newton Tab as advertising-heavy community papers. Two years later, prompted by the closure of The Real Paper, the company expanded into Boston and Cambridge.

At first, CEO Russel Pergament acknowledged that the papers gave softball coverage to some political topics, but said his papers were happy to "live on crumbs from The Globe's table"—to report the local news the big-city daily was missing. He said in 1981 that "we find that the people who live in Brookline and Newton know their local politics better than ever now, largely due to us."

Later that year, however, observers had kudos for the Cambridge Tab, citing its eye-catching headlines and devotion to issue-based journalism as separating it from the 137-year-old Cambridge Chronicle. One reader said he preferred the Tab because "I want to know what's going on behind the scenes in politics. I'm not so interested in who was born or who died or what's on the school lunch menu." Pergament continued to stress the importance of local coverage in a 1986 story about free local weekly papers in Time: "The key to our success is that we're relentlessly local," he said.

=== MetroWest expansion ===
After solidifying the Tab's position in Boston and the near-west suburbs, the company joined a 1985 rush to capture the MetroWest market. Wellesley, formerly monopolized by the Townsman, a 79-year-old weekly, saw the advent of NewsWest, a regional weekly, and a new local news page at the Middlesex News daily, which also bought the Townsman that year.

Tab entered the Wellesley market in October, months after NewsWest. Mark Jurkowitz, editor of the new Wellesley Tab, said "We live and die with local coverage. We felt there was a need in Wellesley for a good, exciting, feisty weekly."

While criticizing NewsWest's regional perspective, Tab followed its competitors farther into MetroWest the next year, opening Tabs in Framingham, Natick and Weston in May 1986. Pergament reiterated that the difference between his newspapers and the others was local focus: "People are not getting enough local news" in NewsWest and the Middlesex News, he said. "Well, we're going to give them local news like they've never had it before -- we're going to out-News the News."

=== Purchase of NewsWest ===
While the Tab came trickling into MetroWest town-by-town, a regional weekly hit eight communities at once, May 22, 1985. NewsWest mailed 45,000 free copies per week, hitting every home in Dover, Natick, Needham, Sherborn, Sudbury, Wayland, Wellesley and Weston.

On April 1, 1986, NewsWest expanded into Ashland, Holliston and Framingham. Pergament denigrated his regional competitor, calling it "that amateur hour", while NewsWest president James Kerasiotes alleged that Tab and the Middlesex News were trying to sabotage their new competitor.

Over the next few years, NewsWest added several more towns to its distribution area -- Hopkinton, Marlborough, Needham, Southborough, Westborough—and in 1989 approached Tab Communications in an attempt to buy it. Instead, Tab ended up purchasing NewsWest, bringing its founder James Carlin on board as company chairman and retaining Kerasiotes as a board member. Tab's circulation, at the time, was given at 163,000.

=== Bought by Fidelity ===
Following a tough year economically, Tab in 1991 sent a letter to its subscribers asking for a voluntary donation of US$10 to keep the newspapers, and community events they sponsored, afloat.

Late in 1992, Cummings, Pergament and Yousoufian sold out for an undisclosed price to Fidelity Investments. Cummings and Pergament stayed on as heads of Tab Communications, which formed a semi-autonomous division of Community Newspaper Company. The deal raised CNC's weekly circulation to 550,000.

Tab Communications was dissolved in early 1996, when CNC realigned its operating units by geography, splitting the Tabs between the new Metro and West units. The former Tab headquarters, in Needham, became CNC's corporate office and headquarters of the Metro Unit; the West Tabs moved in with their former competitor, the Middlesex News.

== Properties ==
Upon its sale to CNC in 1992, Tab Communications consisted of 14 free weekly newspapers, with a circulation well over 150,000, all in the immediate Boston area or MetroWest, Massachusetts (the year of the newspapers' first issue is in parentheses):

- Allston-Brighton Tab of Allston and Brighton (1981, as Boston Tab)
- Ashland Tab of Ashland (late 1980s)
- Brookline Tab of Brookline (1979)
- Cambridge Tab of Cambridge (1981)
- Dover Tab of Dover (late 1980s)
- Framingham Tab of Framingham (1986)
- Holliston Tab of Holliston (late 1980s)
- Natick Tab of Natick (1986)
- Newton Tab of Newton (1979)
- Sherborn Tab of Sherborn (late 1980s)
- Sudbury Tab of Sudbury (late 1980s)
- Wayland Tab of Wayland (late 1980s)
- Wellesley Tab of Wellesley (1985)
- Weston Tab of Weston (1986)

All of these newspapers except the Dover, Sherborn and Wellesley papers are still published by Community Newspaper Company, in the company's Metro and West units. The Sudbury, Weston and Wayland papers are still issued in combined editions with former competitors; the Cambridge paper still competes with the Chronicle, now also owned by CNC.
