= Madonna Constantine =

American psychologist

Academic background
- Education: University of Memphis; Xavier University of Louisiana

Academic work
- Discipline: Counseling psychology
- Institutions: Teachers College, Columbia University 1998–2008; Temple University; University of Texas at Austin
- Main interests: racial micro aggressions; multicultural competence

Madonna G. Constantine was an American psychology and education professor who formerly taught at Teachers College, Columbia University. She was fired in 2008 on grounds of plagiarism. Since the dismissal of her legal challenges in 2012 there have been no public updates from credible news outlets, academic publishers or legal records regarding Constantine.

== Education and early career ==
Constantine earned a B.S. in psychology from Xavier University of Louisiana in 1984, an M.S. from the same institution in counseling, and a Ph.D. in counseling psychology from the University of Memphis. She worked at the University of Texas at Austin for five years at the Counseling and Mental Health Center before becoming the director of the Temple University vocational counseling center.

She joined Teachers College, Columbia University, in 1998, earned tenure in 2001, and (after a brief interlude at Ohio State University) became a full professor in 2003.

Constantine's primary areas of research were racial micro aggressions and multicultural competence, topics on which she published frequently with Teachers College colleague Derald Wing Sue.

== Noose incident ==
In October 2007, Constantine, an African-American, received national attention when a noose was discovered hanging on the door of her office. Students rallied on Teachers College steps and walked through Columbia's campus denouncing racism at a press conference, where Constantine read from a statement. Her friend and collaborator Derald Wing Sue and her faculty colleague Marie L. Miville strongly supported her.

On October 12, the American Counseling Association offered Constantine their full support. In November 2007, Sharon Brehm, president of the American Psychological Association (APA) deplored "another hate crime on campus", stating, "[M]y colleague Dr.Constantine is particularly knowledgeable about the various experiences that produce an individual who engages in hate crimes. I hope that her many years of research, teaching and advocating for cultural competence can help her to withstand this unconscionable attack."

A day after Teachers College officials were asked for security tapes that could help identify the suspect in the October 9, 2007 noose incident, they agreed to release them. Originally, the college had said it would do so only if the tapes were subpoenaed.

There were allegations that Constantine placed the noose on her own door in an attempt to fabricate an apparent hate crime, or that her friends were involved in placing the noose. In March 2008, a grand jury was convened to investigate the noose incident.

== Plagiarism and dismissal ==
In December 2005, Constantine stepped down as department chair, and faculty elected Suniya S. Luthar to replace her. Early in Luthar's tenure as chair, she was approached by a former Teachers College faculty member as well as some students, all claiming that Constantine had used their scholarly writings without attribution. Luthar brought these complaints to Darlyne Bailey-then Dean at Teachers College. Bailey (a close friend of Constantine), reportedly sought to protect Constantine's job at Teachers College despite her own conflict of interest. Bailey forced Luthar to step down as department chair, and as the new chair, appointed Derald Wing Sue — another close friend and collaborator of Constantine.

In August 2006, a law firm was hired by Teachers College's new President Susan Fuhrman to investigate allegations against Constantine. According to reports, the investigation was handled by a law firm rather than a faculty committee because of administration fears that a misstep might leave the college vulnerable to a lawsuit. In May 2007 (a few months before the noose incident), Constantine filed a lawsuit against Luthar alleging defamation, libel and slander and asked for $100,000 in damages. When the noose appeared, an unidentified individual reportedly named Luthar as a possible suspect to the police and media. Several weeks later, Constantine quietly withdrew the lawsuit against Luthar, without explanation.

A year into their investigations in August 2007, the law firm attorneys spoke with Constantine to get her side of the story. When the noose was reported on October 9, college officials reportedly claimed the investigation had been underway for eighteen months, which (as The New York Times noted) meant it had actually begun prior to, and was in progress during, the time of the noose incident. As she commented on the incident, however, Fuhrman told The New York Times that she had heard "nothing but accolades" from Constantine's students. Constantine's ally Derald Wing Sue speculated that the reasons for the "cruel and hateful act" could have been her work on racism, a disgruntled student, or a conflict with a colleague. Although the police had clearly ruled Luthar out as a suspect, media speculation about her continued. It was not until weeks later that Fuhrman indicated "regret" at not having publicly supported Luthar, "one of the most decent human beings we know".

After their eighteen-month investigation, the law firm issued a report citing "numerous instances in which she [Constantine] used others' work without attribution in papers she published in academic journals over the past five years." Constantine denied the charges of plagiarism and claimed that she was a victim of institutional racism. Constantine alleged that evidence she presented establishing her innocence regarding plagiarism was ignored even after independent third parties had reportedly corroborated said evidence.

The Columbia Daily Spectator (the Columbia student newspaper) reported that the noose incident sparked a renewed discussion of racism at Teachers College. The Spectator also conducted its own analysis of the 36 passages that were involved in Teachers College's determination that Constantine was guilty of academic plagiarism, and the paper concluded that there were significant similarities between the passages by Constantine and passages by Professor Christine Yeh and two Teachers College students. A later Columbia Spectator article reported that Constantine's attorneys had presented evidence to the Columbia Spectator as well as to Columbia which the attorneys asserted proved Constantine's "prior authorship of all of the passages that ... are claimed ... to have been plagiarized". Columbia officials rejected those claims, saying the authenticity of that evidence could not be verified.

On June 23, 2008, Teachers College announced that Constantine would be fired effective the end of the year. In October 2008, Constantine filed suit against the college, alleging that her termination was "arbitrary, irrational, and unauthorized", but the suit was "disposed".

Constantine filed a defamation lawsuit against Columbia in April 2009. She lost one of three lawsuits against Teachers College in March 2010. In October 2010 the New York State Supreme Court dismissed her defamation claims and related tort causes of action. Her subsequent appeals in New York State Courts affirmed the dismissals of her claims. In March 2012, The New York State Supreme Court, Appellate Division, First Department, affirmed the dismissal of Constantine's defamation action against Columbia University and others.

== Publications ==
- Constantine, M.G. (2007). "Racial microaggressions against African American Clients in Cross-Racial Counseling Relationships". Journal of Counseling Psychology, 54, 1–16.
- Smith, T.B., Constantine, M.G., Dunn, T.W., Dinehart, J.M., & Montoya, J.A. (2006). "Multicultural Education in the Mental Health Professions: A Meta-Analytic Review". Journal of Counseling Psychology, 53, 132–145.
- Constantine, M.G., Warren, A.K., & Miville, M.L. (2005). "White Racial Identity Dyadic Interactions in Supervision: Implications for Supervisees' Multicultural Counseling Competence". Journal of Counseling Psychology, 52, 490–496.
- Constantine, M.G., Anderson, G.M., Berkel, L.A., Caldwell, L.D., & Utsey, S.O. (2005). "Examining the Cultural Adjustment Experiences of African International College Students: A Qualitative Analysis". Journal of Counseling Psychology, 52, 57–66.
- Constantine, M.G. (2002). "Predictors of Satisfaction with Counseling: Racial and Ethnic Minority Clients' Attitudes Toward Counseling and Ratings of Their Counselors' General and Multicultural Counseling Competence". Journal of Counseling Psychology, 49, 255–263.
