= Lady Irwin College =

Constituent college of Delhi University

- Motto: Vidya hi Sewa
- Established: 1932; 94 years ago
- Affiliations: University of Delhi
- Academic affiliations: University of Delhi
- Director: Prof. Neelima Asthana
- Students: 1800
- Location: Sikandra Rd, Mandi House, New Delhi, Delhi, 110001, India
- Campus: 16.5 acres; Urban
- Website: www.ladyirwin.edu.in

Lady Irwin College is a constituent college of the University of Delhi located on the North Campus. Established in 1932, it is a women's college located in New Delhi, India, and offers graduate courses in Home Science and Food Technology as well as graduate and post-graduate courses in Home Science. The college offers specialisation in Food and Nutrition, Human Development and Childhood Studies, Resource Management and Design Application, Development Communication and Extension and Fabric and Apparel Sciences. The college also offers studies in the paramedical disciplines of Food Science and Nutrition. The college is among the top 5, and best in Asia, for Home Science; the college is also recognised by world standards. According to the QS World University Rankings by Subject 2021, Lady Irwin College was ranked in the range of 251-300 for the subject of "Education"

== History ==
In 1928, the All India Women's Conference began to raise funds for the college. The college was established in 1932 under the patronage of Lady Dorothy Irwin, wife of Lord Irwin, Viceroy of India and the Maharanis of Baroda and Bhopal, Sarojini Naidu, Rajkumari Amrit Kaur, Annie Besant, Kamala Devi Chattopadhyay, Margaret Cousins and Sir Ganga Ram Kaula.

Hannah Sen (1894–1957) was a Baghdadi Jewish woman. She was the founder of the Lady Irwin College in Delhi in 1932. Sen served as the director of the college until her retirement in 1947. An existing building on the grounds of Lady Irwin College is named after her.

The buildings of the college campus have been classified and protected as heritage sites.

The college shifted to its current campus at Sikandra Road in 1938. Until 1950, it was managed by the All India Women's Education Fund Association, after which it became affiliated with the University of Delhi, and honours degree courses were introduced in the college.

=== Motto ===
The aphorism "Vidya Hi Seva" (lit. 'Education is Service') is read beneath the crest of the College emblem. During the pre-independence period, along with Lady Dorothy Irwin, Mahatma Gandhi and Rajkumari Amrit Kaur were amongst the other revolutionists who participated in the struggle by the way of emancipation of women. The college came up in 1931, but during the course of developments, Rajkumari Amrit Kaur and M.K. Gandhi exchanged letters over the finalisation of the motto for the emblem. Discussing how "knowledge itself is service" against "service itself is knowledge", Gandhi gave a green signal for the previous one. The teaching learning transactions true to the motto, endeavour to inculcate a sense of knowledge to serve through carefully designed outreach experiences.

== Courses ==
- B.Sc. (Pass) Home Science - 3-year degree course.
- B.Sc. (Honors) Home Science - 3-year degree course.
- B.Ed (Home Science) -2 year degree course
- B.Ed. Special Education (MR) - 1-year degree course.
- B.Sc. Food technology
- Post Graduate Diploma in Dietetics & Public Health Nutrition - 1-year diploma course
- M.Sc. Home Science - 2-year degree course in:
  - Food & Nutrition
  - Human Development & Childhood Studies
  - Fabric and Apparel Science
  - Development Communication & Extension
  - Resource Management & Design Application
- Ph.D. - In all five specialisations of Home Science

== Rankings ==
It is ranked 23rd among colleges in India by the National Institutional Ranking Framework (NIRF) in 2024.

University rankings

== Alumni ==
- Manpreet Brar, model and Miss India 1995
- Shyamala Gopalan, Indian-American cancer researcher (mother of Kamala Harris)
- Ritu Kumar, fashion designer
- Suniya S. Luthar, Professor Emerita at Teachers College Columbia University
- Thangam Philip, Padma Shri civilian award winner for her contributions to the field of nutrition and her pioneering role in hospitality education in India
- Sushma Seth, actor and founder Yatrik Theatre Group
- Chitrangada Singh, actor
- Dr Manpreet Kaur, UN honoured Social Scientist and AI Strategist, Dual Nomination & Finalist at AI for Good Global Summit on 9th July 2025, Geneva, Switzerland and Co Founder SidLabs LLP

== See also ==
- Education in India
- Literacy in India
- List of institutions of higher education in Delhi
