= Stanley Sue =

American clinical psychologist (1944–2024)

- Born: February 13, 1944; Portland, Oregon, U.S.
- Died: June 6, 2024 (aged 80)
- Occupation: Professor of Clinical Psychology
- Awards: APA Award for Distinguished Contributions to Psychology in the Public Interest (1986); APA Award for Distinguished Contributions to Research in Public Policy (1996); APA Stanley Sue Award for Distinguished Contributions to Diversity in Clinical Psychology (2003)

Academic background
- Education: University of California, Los Angeles; University of Oregon

Academic work
- Institutions: Palo Alto University

Stanley Sue (February 13, 1944 – June 6, 2024) was an American clinical psychologist known for his contributions to the field of multicultural studies, specifically in relation to the mental health issues of ethnic minorities and the need for cultural competence in the treatment of psychological disorders. Sue was a Distinguished Professor of Clinical Psychology at Palo Alto University. His work is often cited in discussions about the educational achievements of Asian Americans and the model minority stereotype.

Sue was a co-author of popular textbooks and other titles including Understanding Abnormal Behavior, Essentials of Understanding Abnormal Behavior, and The Mental Health of Asian Americans: Contemporary Issues in Identifying and Treating Mental Problems.

== Biography ==
Stanley Sue was born on February 13, 1944, in Portland, Oregon to Tom and Lucy Sue. Sue was a second generation Chinese American. He had four siblings - David, Lynda Leslie and Derald Wing Sue, Professor of Psychology and Education at Teachers College, Columbia University, with whom he collaborated extensively. Sue and his brother Derald were co-founders of the Asian American Psychological Association. He married Sophia in 1969 and they celebrated 55 years of marriage before he died. Even though he was known as a leading psychologist, he was also someone who valued time with his family, students and colleagues. He is not only remembered as a remarkable psychologist but as someone who brought warmth and energy into people's lives.

The social and political time that Sue was born in, was post–World War II, where Asian Americans faced prejudice and discrimination due to their ethnicity. Asian American communities faced stereotypes, and had limited access to schools, housing, and jobs. In the 1960s and 1970s, where Sue was pursuing higher education and beginning his career, there was a lot of civil unrest. The Civil Rights Movement was prevalent as they were fighting against inequality in education, health care, and job opportunities. This greatly influenced and furthered his interest in culture and mental health.

Sue received his B.S. degree in Psychology at the University of Oregon in 1966. He subsequently attended graduate school at the University of California, Los Angeles (UCLA), where he obtained an M.A. degree in 1967 and a Ph.D. in Clinical Psychology in 1971. Sue's doctoral dissertation on modes of reducing cognitive dissonance was conducted under the supervision of Bertram Raven. Sue was a member of the faculty at the University of Washington, UCLA, and the University of California, Davis prior to joining the faculty at Palo Alto University in 2011.

== Contributions ==
In 1972, Sue co-founded the Asian American Psychological Association (AAPA) alongside his brother Derald Wing Sue and other colleagues, creating one of the first professional spaces dedicated to Asian American mental health. From 1988 to 2001, he served as the founding director of the National Research Center on Asian American Mental Health, funded by the National Institute of Mental Health, which trained scholars and produced pioneering research.

In 2001, Sue was appointed science editor for the U.S. Surgeon General’s supplement Mental Health: Culture, Race, and Ethnicity, a landmark report that highlighted racial disparities in mental health care and pushed cultural competence into national policy conversations.

He helped push the idea of cultural competence, that therapists need to take into account the client’s cultural background for treatment to be effective. He also introduced the concepts of therapist credibility and giving, demonstrating how these processes can build trust and make therapy more effective for minority clients.

== Research ==
Sue's work was dedicated to ethnic minorities and the difficulties they face in receiving treatment for mental health issues and how they may struggle in society due to discrimination and prejudice. Sue raised awareness of these issues and brought his research to medical committees to advocate for change.

In pioneering research, Sue and his colleague Herman McKinney followed over 14,000 clients in 17 community mental health agencies located in King County in the State of Washington. The researchers observed that Black clients receiving treatment tended to drop out much earlier than White clients. Sue offered ideas on how to properly address this issue while raising awareness that the situation was even happening in the first place. Sue also brought to light that there may be a lack of transparency and connection in how a therapist works with a minority client. In doing so, Sue identified holes that were present in the field of psychology regarding the treatment of ethnic minorities and addressed the problem by advocating for multicultural competence in mental health care.

In 2003, in In Defense of Cultural Competency in Psychotherapy and Treatment, Sue responded to critics by defending cultural competence as both a scientific and ethical responsibility, balancing the need for research with the urgency of ongoing disparities.

== Awards ==
Sue received various prestigious awards throughout his career. These include the American Psychological Association (APA) Distinguished Contributions to Psychology in the Public Interest Award in 1986 and the APA Distinguished Contributions to Research in Public Policy in 1996. Sue received the inaugural Stanley Sue Award for Distinguished Contributions to Diversity in Clinical Psychology in 2003. This award is given annually by the APA to "psychologists who have made remarkable contributions to the understanding of human diversity and whose contributions have significant promise for bettering the human condition, overcoming prejudice, and enhancing the quality of life for humankind."

Other awards include the 1990 Distinguished Contributions to Research in Ethnic Minority Psychology, given by the Society for the Psychological Study of Ethnic Minority Issues (APA Division 45); the 1990 Distinguished Contribution Award from the Asian American Psychological Association; and the 1999 Dalmas A. Taylor Award for Pioneering Leadership, Scholarship, and Aggressive Advocacy for Ethnic Minorities.
