= Arthur E. Levine =

American academic (born 1948)

Arthur Elliott Levine
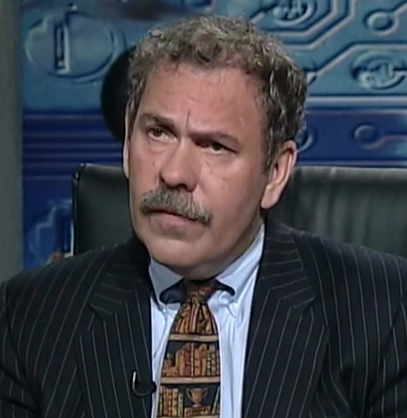
- Levine on CUNY TV's Education Forum, 2000

10th President of Brandeis University
- Incumbent
- Assumed office November 1, 2024
- Preceded by: Ronald D. Liebowitz

16th President of Teachers College, Columbia University
- In office 1994–2006
- Preceded by: Philip M. Timpane
- Succeeded by: Susan Fuhrman

Personal details
- Born: The Bronx, New York City, US
- Education: Brandeis University (BA); State University of New York at Buffalo (PhD)

Arthur Elliot Levine (born 1948) is an American education scholar and academic administrator. He has served as the tenth president of Brandeis University since 2024, initially as interim president beginning November 1, 2024, and formally installed in 2025. He previously served as president of Teachers College, Columbia University, and as president of the Woodrow Wilson National Fellowship Foundation.

== Career ==
Levine graduated from the Bronx High School of Science and from Brandeis University in 1970. He earned his PhD in sociology from the State University of New York at Buffalo after teaching in the Boston public schools.

From 1975 until 1982 he served as a senior fellow at the Carnegie Foundation.

Levine served as the president of Bradford College in Massachusetts from 1982 to 1989.

In 1989, he became a senior lecturer at the Harvard Graduate School of Education, where he later chaired the Higher Education Program and the Institute for Educational Management.

=== President of Teachers College, Columbia University ===
From 1994 to 2006, he served as president of Teachers College, Columbia University. During his tenure at Teachers College, he led a $155 million capital campaign, the most successful capital campaign undertaken by a graduate school of education at that time.

=== President of the Woodrow Wilson National Fellowship Foundation ===
From 2006 to 2019, he served as president of the Woodrow Wilson National Fellowship Foundation, now the Institute for Citizens and Scholars, where he led initiatives aimed at improving teacher preparation, particularly in science, technology, engineering, and mathematics (STEM) fields, and expanding access to graduate education.

=== President of Brandeis University ===
On November 1, 2024, Levine was appointed interim president of Brandeis University following the resignation of then-president Ronald Liebowitz. In July 2025, Brandeis' board of trustees voted to extend Levine's service through 2027.

Levine is the author of 13 books and numerous reports on higher education, professional education, and institutional governance, including The Great Upheaval: Higher Education's Past, Present, and Uncertain Future. His work has examined issues such as leadership, accreditation, the future of universities, and reform in professional schools.

== Awards and honors ==
Levine was elected a Fellow of the American Academy of Arts and Sciences in 2006 and has received honorary degrees from 26 universities.

== Personal life ==
Levine was born in South Bronx, New York City, and is Jewish. Levine met his wife while they were undergraduate students at Brandeis University.
