= Barbara Wallace =

Barbara Wallace may refer to:

- Barbara Wallace (politician) (1918–2011), politician in British Columbia, Canada
- Barbara Brooks Wallace (1922–2018), American children's writer
- Barbara C. Wallace, clinical psychologist
- Barbara Wallace (born 1935), actress from Riverdale
