= Laurie L. Patton =

American academic (born 1961)

Laurie Patton
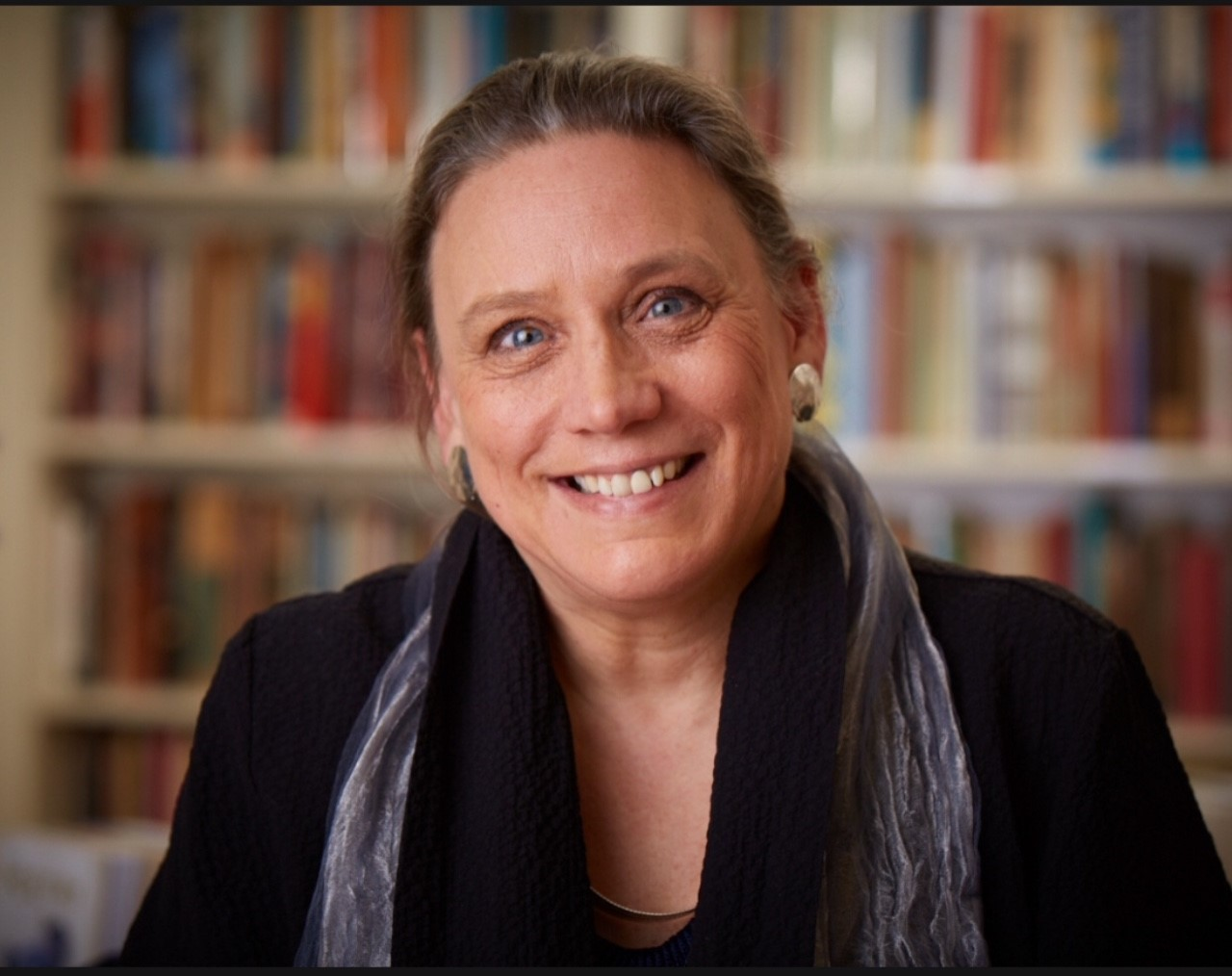

President of American Academy of Arts and Sciences
- Incumbent
- Assumed office January 1, 2025
- Preceded by: David W. Oxtoby

17th President of Middlebury College
- In office July 1, 2015 – December 31, 2024
- Preceded by: Ronald D. Liebowitz

Personal details
- Born: November 14, 1961 (age 64)
- Spouse: Shalom Goldman
- Education: Harvard University (BA); University of Chicago (PhD)

Laurie L. Patton (born November 14, 1961) is an American academic, author, poet and professor of Asian religion who is President of the American Academy of Arts & Sciences. She served as President of Middlebury College from 2015 to 2024.

== Early life and education ==
Patton was raised in Danvers, Massachusetts, and graduated from Choate Rosemary Hall in Wallingford, Connecticut. She earned a Bachelor of Arts degree from Harvard University in 1983 and her PhD from the University of Chicago in 1991. She was a Fulbright Scholar at Tel Aviv University in Israel in 1999 and at Deccan College in India in 2000.

== Career ==
She was the Charles Howard Candler Professor of Early Indian Religions at Emory University before becoming the Robert F. Durden Professor of Religion and Dean of Arts and Sciences at Duke University. She was named Middlebury's 17th president on November 18, 2014, and became Middlebury's first woman president upon taking office on July 1, 2015. She completed her service to Middlebury in December 2024 and began her presidency of the American Academy in January 2025.

Patton has taught in public venues nationally and internationally on interfaith issues, comparative religion, and religion and conflict. In 2008 and 2009 she co-hosted a TV series on "Faith and Feminism" for Atlanta Interfaith Broadcasting. She served as department chair from 2000 to 2007 and as conveyor of the Religions and the Human Spirit Strategic Plan from 2005 to 2007, and as the Winship Distinguished Research Professor from 2003 to 2006. She received Emory's highest award for teaching, the Emory Williams Award, in 2006.

=== Works ===
She focuses her research on early Indian rituals, narrative and mythology, literary theory in religious studies, and Hinduism in modern India. She has published on the interpretation of early Indian ritual and narrative, comparative mythology, literary theory in the study of religion, women and Hinduism in contemporary India, and religion and conflict.

Her early Indological work applies literary theory and theory of canon to the texts of early India, particularly Vedic texts. Later, she used a theory of metonymy to rethink the application of mantras in early Indian ritual. Her first edited work, Authority, Anxiety, and Canon (1994) surveyed the larger field of Vedic interpretation as it existed in various intellectual contexts throughout India.

She was co-editor on Myth and Method an assessment of the state of the field in comparative mythology. Her co-edited work with Edwin Bryant (2005) brings together for the first time a variety of differing perspectives on the problem of Aryan origins.

Patton has also worked on gender questions, beginning with her edited volume, Jewels of Authority (2002), which examined early feminist stereotypes about women in Indian textual traditions as well as contemporary life. Her recent articles on gender are derived from her present project, the first ethnography of women Sanskritists ever to be undertaken in India.

Her translation of the Bhagavad Gita in the Penguin Classics Series follows a free verse style constrained by eight-line stanzas.

She has also published three books of poetry, including House Crossing, which was published in May 2018.

Preceded by Ronald D. Liebowitz	President of Middlebury College; 2015–Present	Succeeded by Stephen B. Snyder (interim)
