= Institute for Citizens and Scholars =

Non-profit organization in the US

The Institute for Citizens and Scholars (formerly known as the Woodrow Wilson National Fellowship Foundation) is a nonpartisan, non-profit institution based in Princeton, New Jersey, that says it aims to strengthen American democracy by "cultivating the talent, ideas, and networks that develop lifelong, effective citizens". It administers programs and fellowships that support civic education and engagement, leadership development, and organizational capacity in education and democracy.

In June 2020, the Board of Trustees of the foundation voted unanimously to remove Woodrow Wilson from its name, citing his racist policies and beliefs. In November 2020, the organization was renamed the Institute for Citizens and Scholars.

== History ==
=== Early years (1945–1957) ===
The first Woodrow Wilson Fellowships were created by Dr. Whitney J. Oates, a Princeton University classics professor who served in the Marine Corps during World War II. During his tour of duty, Professor Oates realized that many of his brightest undergraduates who had served in the armed forces were unlikely to go on to doctoral study and college teaching careers when the war was over. As the G.I. Bill took shape, however, it was clear that college enrollments would expand, and the ranks of qualified college instructors must grow.

Oates and the Princeton graduate dean, Sir Hugh Taylor, developed a program of fellowships funded by various individual donors to help recruit veterans to Princeton's Ph.D. programs in the humanities. In 1945, these fellowships were combined into one program and named for Woodrow Wilson, a champion of teaching and of graduate studies during his tenure as president of Princeton. The Woodrow Wilson Fellowships provided full funding for Ph.D. studies, with the proviso that recipients plan a career in college teaching.

Other universities and national funders began to recognize the importance of recruiting future college professors. In 1947, Carnegie Corporation of New York provided $100,000 to expand the program to selected universities nationwide. Gradually the program broadened to extend eligibility beyond veterans, in fields other than the humanities. In 1951 the Fellowship program was placed under the administration of the Association of Graduate Schools. In the same year, the first women were granted Woodrow Wilson Fellowships.

In 1953 Robert F. Goheen, who had been one of the first four Woodrow Wilson Fellows in 1945, became national director of the Woodrow Wilson National Fellowship Program, expanding the program to 200 fellowships nationally. Over the next several years, other funders, including the Rockefeller Foundation, also supported the program.

=== The national Woodrow Wilson Fellowship (1957–1974) ===
In 1957, the Ford Foundation provided a five-year, $24.5 million grant to support up to 1,000 Woodrow Wilson Fellowships annually, and the Woodrow Wilson National Fellowship Foundation was independently incorporated. Fellowships were offered across the range of arts and sciences. Overall, during the following decade—including two renewal grants, in 1962 and 1966—the Fellowships received $52 million in Ford Foundation support, providing both awards to Fellows and supplemental support to the graduate schools hosting them.

Throughout these years, a rigorous interview process was the hallmark of the Woodrow Wilson Fellowship. Professors nominated or recommended promising seniors, and applications underwent review at the Foundation, with finalists examined by regional panels on campuses around the country. A 1960 TIME magazine article proclaimed, "The Woodrow Wilson Fellowship is fast becoming a domestic version of the Rhodes Scholarship."

Foundation policies stipulated that candidates could not hold both the Woodrow Wilson Fellowship and other, similar fellowships for doctoral study. Some candidates, after successfully completing the intensive interviews, declined the Woodrow Wilson Fellowships to accept Rhodes Scholarships, National Science Foundation fellowships, and other such awards. These candidates were allowed designation as honorary Woodrow Wilson Fellows.

In addition to the full Woodrow Wilson Fellowships, various complementary awards were offered during the 1960s and early 1970s. These included Woodrow Wilson Dissertation Fellowships, offered to supplement the original award for Fellows who required dissertation support; Teaching and Administrative Internships, designed to engage graduate students and young administrators with the nation's historically black colleges and universities; and Martin Luther King, Jr. Fellowships, specifically intended for African American veterans of the armed forces. The mix of a signature fellowship with complementary programs to create access and capacity in the nation's education system became a pattern for later Woodrow Wilson Foundation activities.

By the early 1970s full funding for the Woodrow Wilson Fellowships had diminished, and, over the concluding several years of the program, the Foundation reduced both the number and amount of awards. By the time the original Woodrow Wilson Fellowship program ended, nearly 18,000 Fellows had been named. Woodrow Wilson Fellows went on to receive 13 Nobel Prizes, 35 MacArthur "genius grants," 11 Pulitzer Prizes, 21 Presidential Medals, and many other awards.

=== Other higher education fellowships at Woodrow Wilson (1974–present) ===
As the original large-scale Woodrow Wilson Fellowships came to an end, the Foundation still sought to provide opportunity in higher education for specific groups of students. Following a precedent set by some of the Foundation's earlier supplementary fellowships, the Woodrow Wilson Dissertation Fellowship in Women's Studies, created in 1974, not only bolstered the growth of feminist scholarship across the humanities and social sciences, but also supported primarily women scholars completing Ph.D.s in these fields at a time when women were significantly underrepresented in doctoral study.

In the 1980s and 1990s the Woodrow Wilson Foundation continued to encourage work in targeted academic disciplines. The Charlotte W. Newcombe Doctoral Dissertation Fellowship, funded by the Charlotte W. Newcombe Foundation, still supports completion of Ph.D. work on ethical or religious values in any field of the humanities or social sciences. Other Woodrow Wilson programs created during the 1980s and 1990s to strengthen specific academic fields included the Andrew W. Mellon Fellowship in the Humanities (1982–2006) and the Spencer Dissertation Fellowships in Education (1987–1992).

During the same period, the Foundation also established fellowships in higher education to encourage preparation for specific national high-need fields such as women's health.

From time to time, fellowships have also provided support for individuals at particular stages of their careers in higher education, such as the Millicent McIntosh Fellowships for Recently Tenured Faculty and the Woodrow Wilson Academic Postdoctoral Fellowships in the Humanities.

=== Professional development for teachers (1974–present) ===
During the years after the original Woodrow Wilson Fellowships, the Foundation also launched various programs to cultivate and support teachers at the middle- and high-school levels, as well as in college. The earliest of these was the Woodrow Wilson Teacher Fellowship (1974–1981). Though limited in scope, serving just 42 teachers, it paved the way for the subsequent Leadership Program for Teachers (1982–2003), which brought more than 2,400 teachers into summer enrichment programs with university faculty. The related Woodrow Wilson National Network of Seminars for Teachers, begun in 1999 as Teachers as Scholars, also offers professional development, bringing teachers back to university campuses for intensive seminars in their disciplines with leading arts and sciences faculty. These programs would serve as precursors to the more recent Woodrow Wilson Teaching Fellowship.

=== Organizational capacity in K-12 and higher education (1974–present) ===
Some of the earliest work of the initial Woodrow Wilson Fellowships required building new networks and capacities in higher education. Subsequent programs made this focus on organizational capacity more explicit.

In the 1970s, the Rockefeller Foundation and other funders supported a program of Woodrow Wilson Teaching and Administrative Internships that brought graduate students to historically black colleges and universities, seeking both to strengthen HBCUs' faculty and to provide these young scholars and leaders with campus-based experience.

A separate program of the same era, the Woodrow Wilson Visiting Fellows, created a "speakers bureau" that brought national leaders in for week-long residencies on small campuses at a distance from major metropolitan areas, working one-on-one and in small groups with students and faculty. The Council of Independent Colleges now manages this ongoing program.

During the 1990s, troubled by the apparent and growing mismatch between liberal arts doctoral education and the academic and nonacademic job markets, the Foundation created a suite of programs that included the Humanities at Work and the Responsive Ph.D. The former sought both to widen potential nonacademic employers' understanding of the skills offered by individuals with doctoral-level humanities backgrounds and, within the academy, to encourage both graduate students' and faculty's appreciation for the role of the humanities in a larger socioeconomic context. The related Responsive Ph.D. initiative created a network of institutions committed to rethinking graduate education in a way that aligned doctoral graduates' preparation more fully with the academic careers awaiting them.

As in its individual work with K-12 teachers, the Foundation also, in the early 2000s, turned its attention to building networks and capacity among high schools. Through the Woodrow Wilson Early College Initiative, supported by the Bill & Melinda Gates Foundation, the Foundation drew on its higher education networks to create small middle and high schools through a series of school-university partnerships. These schools—part of a national Early College network serving high-need, low-income students—created models for preparing all students in a school to attend and graduate college. The WW Early College strategy includes dual enrollment, academic rigor, practical skills coaching, and on-campus experience.

== Current activities ==
=== Higher Education Fellowships ===
In 2007, under the new leadership of Arthur Levine, the board and staff concluded that the achievement gap was perhaps the nation's most urgent education need, not only at the K-12 level but also for institutions of higher education, which are dependent on college-ready students, and for society at large, which requires a well-educated, sophisticated workforce drawn from all socioeconomic backgrounds.

Based on numerous studies indicating that the presence of a well-prepared teacher is the single most important factor in student achievement, the Foundation created the Woodrow Wilson Teaching Fellowship to serve as its signature program for the near- to mid-term. The Woodrow Wilson Teaching Fellowship is intended to recruit exceptionally well-qualified individuals into teaching in high-need urban and rural secondary schools, as well as to transform the way in which they are prepared to teach.

The WW Teaching Fellowship was launched in 2007 in two versions. One version funded by the Annenberg Foundation, the Leonore Annenberg Teaching Fellowship, was implemented at four selected national universities—Stanford University and the Universities of Pennsylvania, Virginia, and Washington—that showcase excellence in teacher preparation. In the other, state-based model, Fellows enroll in an intensive master's-level teacher preparation program at one of a designated group of universities. The universities, in exchange for receiving exceptional teacher candidates and a matching grant, agree to rethink their teacher preparation programs, emphasizing classroom experience from the early phases of the program. A third related program, the Woodrow Wilson-Rockefeller Brothers Fund Fellowship for Aspiring Teachers of Color, was transferred to the Woodrow Wilson Foundation in 2009 by the Rockefeller Brothers Fund. Fellows across all three programs receive $30,000 stipends and enroll in teacher preparation programs designated by the Woodrow Wilson Foundation.

The state-based model of the WW Teaching Fellowship was first implemented as the Woodrow Wilson Indiana Teaching Fellowship in December 2007 with the support of Lilly Endowment and Indiana Governor Mitch Daniels. Two additional states, Michigan and Ohio, signed on in late 2009 and 2010, creating, respectively, the W.K. Kellogg Foundation's Woodrow Wilson Michigan Teaching Fellowship, endorsed by Michigan Governor Jennifer Granholm, and the Woodrow Wilson Ohio Teaching Fellowship, endorsed by Ohio Governor Ted Strickland and supported by the Ohio Board of Regents' Choose Ohio First program, with additional funds from a statewide group of private philanthropies. The Indiana, Michigan, and Ohio programs all focus specifically on teacher preparation in science, technology, engineering, and mathematics, also known as the STEM fields. Pennsylvania, New Jersey and Georgia were subsequently added to the program.

In addition to its teacher preparation activities, the organization continues to offer a suite of fellowships that prepare emerging scholars and leaders for success in the American academy and in several high-need fields. These include the Dissertation Fellowship in Women's Studies, the Charlotte W. Newcombe Doctoral Dissertation Fellowship (ending in 2024), a fellowship for journalists reporting on higher education, a suite of fellowships funded by the Mellon Foundation, including one for emerging faculty leaders.

=== College Presidents for Civic Preparedness ===
College Presidents for Civic Preparedness, launched in 2023, brings together more than 70 campus leaders from diverse institutions across the country who are committed to preparing today’s young people for citizenship in American democracy. They share a set of civic commitments to foster free expression, civil discourse, and civic readiness within higher education.Together, they seek to provide students with meaningful civic education and opportunities to develop skills, habits, practices, and norms for living in a pluralistic society.

=== The Civic Spring Fellowship ===
Launched in 2020, the Civic Spring Fellowship awards grants and coaching support to young people or members of youth-centered organizations who are working on projects that address a local community need, such as public health or local elections. Fellows work in communities across the country while building skills to continue engaging in and driving meaningful change for the long term.

== Institute for Citizens & Scholars Leadership ==
The president of the organization is Rajiv Vinnakota, former Executive Vice-President of the Aspen Institute and co-founder of the SEED Foundation. The Board of Trustees is chaired by Stefanie Sanford, former Chief of Global Policy & External Relations at The College Board.
