= Ronald D. Liebowitz =

American academic administrator

Ronald David Liebowitz
- Liebowitz in 2008

9th President of Brandeis University
- In office July 1, 2016 – November 1, 2024
- Preceded by: Frederick M. Lawrence
- Succeeded by: Arthur E. Levine

16th President of Middlebury College
- In office July 1, 2004 – June 30, 2015
- Preceded by: John McCardell, Jr.
- Succeeded by: Laurie L. Patton

Personal details
- Born: April 26, 1957 (age 69) Brooklyn, New York City, U.S.
- Education: Bucknell University (BA); Columbia University (PhD)
- Scientific career
- Fields: Geography
- Workplaces: Middlebury College; Brandeis University
- Thesis: The spatial and ethnic dimensions of Soviet regional investment: 1956-1975 (1985)
- Doctoral advisor: Robert Lewis

Ronald David Liebowitz (born April 26, 1957) is an American geography scholar. He served as the 9th president of Brandeis University from 2016 to 2024 and as the 16th president of Middlebury College from 2004 to 2015.

With research fields in Russian economic and political geography, he began teaching at Middlebury in 1984.

== Early life and education ==
Liebowitz was born in Brooklyn, New York.

Liebowitz received a Bachelor of Arts degree from Bucknell University in 1979 and a Doctor of Philosophy degree from Columbia University in 1985.

== Career ==
=== Middlebury College ===
Liebowitz was Middlebury's third faculty member to become president, following McCardell and 19th century alumnus Ezra Brainerd. In his first year, he shaped the agreement that brought the Monterey Institute of International Studies under affiliation with Middlebury, and began a comprehensive strategic planning and fundraising process. The acquisition of Monterey was always seen as risky and controversial, initially passing over objections from Middlebury faculty and students.

In 2009 Time Magazine named him one of the 10 best college presidents.

On December 12, 2013, Liebowitz announced that he would step down as president of the college effective June 30, 2015. He served at Middlebury College for over 11 years.

=== Brandeis University ===
On December 17, 2015, Liebowitz announced that he would begin serving in a leadership role at Brandeis University effective July 1, 2016.

Ronald D. Liebowitz began his tenure as president of Brandeis University in 2016. Over the course of his leadership, the university's position in the U.S. News & World Report national rankings declined significantly—from 34th in 2016 to 63rd in 2025. While this drop partly reflected methodological changes in the ranking system that deprioritized factors favoring private institutions, Brandeis’s pronounced decline drew concern from some faculty, alumni, and students who questioned the university’s strategic direction and administrative priorities during this period.

Liebowitz’s presidency has also been marked by tensions over governance, communication transparency, and long-term planning. Critics have pointed to inconsistent messaging, high administrative turnover, and what some viewed as a top-down decision-making style. Despite some improvements in fundraising and value-based rankings, questions remain about the efficacy and clarity of his vision for Brandeis’s future.

In March 2021, Liebowitz accused the Board of Trustees of "trying to force him out of the presidency." However, on April 9, 2021, the Board of Trustees announced a five-year contract extension on Liebowitz's presidency. In September 2024, Liebowitz resigned after the faculty passed a no-confidence vote against him. The non-binding resolution cited his handling of the budget crisis and student protests.

| Preceded by John McCardell, Jr. | President of Middlebury College; 2004–2015 | Succeeded by Laurie L. Patton |
