= Susan Fuhrman =

American academic administrator

- Born: Susan Harriet Fuhrman; 1944 (age 81–82); The Bronx, New York, U.S.
- Known for: founding Consortium for Policy Research in Education
- Board member of: National Academy of Education president 2009–2013

Academic background
- Education: Northwestern University (BA, MA); Columbia University (PhD)
- Thesis: The Classification of Roll Call Votes in New Jersey (1977)

Academic work
- Institutions: Columbia University; University of Pennsylvania
- Main interests: Educational equity; School reform

Susan Harriet Fuhrman (born April 1944) is an American education policy scholar and served from 2006 as the first female president of Teachers College, Columbia University. Fuhrman earned her doctorate in Political Science and Education from Columbia University. She is an authority on school reform.

Fuhrman served as the Dean of the University of Pennsylvania Graduate School of Education for 11 years, where she is widely credited with elevating Penn GSE to enhanced national stature by "focusing on themes of urban and international education and broadening involvement with schools in underserved communities..." Prior to her service as dean at Pennsylvania, Fuhrman taught at Rutgers University and founded the Consortium for Policy Research in Education, the nation's first federally funded education policy center.

In 2007 Fuhrman was named one of New York's 100 most influential women by Crain's New York Business. In 2009, she also became president of the National Academy of Education.

== Early life and education ==
Susan Harriet Fuhrman was born in April 1944 in the Bronx, the daughter of Irene Satz Levine, who rose from a stock girl to become Vice President of Ohrbach's department store. With a mother and three aunts who were all successful professionals, Fuhrman says, she always “had the model of a woman who was independent and a major figure in whatever field she chose to be in.”

Fuhrman is a graduate of New York City public schools, including Hunter College High School which she graduated from in 1961. She earned her B.A. and M.A. degrees in history from Northwestern University in Evanston, Illinois. After teaching in secondary schools and studying policy planning and administration in the School of Education at the University of California, Berkeley, she received a Ph.D. in political science and education at Teachers College, Columbia University in 1977. Her dissertation was titled, “The Classification of Roll Call Votes in New Jersey.”

Fuhrman's Teachers College advisor and mentor was Donna Shalala, later U.S. Secretary of Health and Human Services and President of the University of Miami, who enabled Fuhrman and other students to gain real-world experience working with the Connecticut State legislature and a commission appointed by New York Governor Hugh Carey. Fuhrman has credited Shalala for her own subsequent focus on “the interaction of theory and practice” and her lifelong interest in “working closely with policymakers to do practice based on good, research-based advice "

== Consortium for Policy Research and Education (CPRE) ==
After completing graduate school, Fuhrman taught public policy at Rutgers’ Eagleton Institute for Politics during the early 1980s. It was there, in 1985, that she founded the Consortium for Policy Research and Education (CPRE), a joint venture among leading schools of education that included scholars such as future U.S. Secretary of Education Richard Riley; Richard Elmore, now the Gregory R. Anrig Professor of Educational Leadership at Harvard; and Marshall Smith, later Undersecretary of Education under President Clinton.

CPRE conducted some of the most influential early analyses of what would become the state education standards movement, critiquing the spate of school reforms enacted following the publication of “A Nation at Risk.” That report famously highlighted the failure of American students to keep pace with their counterparts in Japan, Germany and other countries. CPRE determined that the reforms of the 1980s were fragmented and largely ineffective. In a series of articles and policy briefs, the CPRE group articulated a theory of standards-based reform that called for directly tying text books, teacher preparation and testing to statewide standards for student learning. That vision was adopted by the National Science Foundation, which began funding state systemic initiatives in the late 1980s and 90s, and was subsequently taken up by every major policy association and adopted, to varying degrees, by nearly every state.

“The big shift coming from CPRE was about changing standards from the generic benchmarking that had gone on in the past to something that actually shaped what students were learning in the classroom,” Marshall Smith said in 2007.

While Fuhrman has continued to call for standards that promote deeper learning, she has publicly stated that, with the passage of the federal No Child Left Behind Act and other measures, the standards movement has focused excessively on testing and other accountability measures.

“The early visions of standards-based reform were that states would develop standards and use them to develop curriculum,” she said in an interview in 2013. “Instead, states developed standards and nobody developed curriculum. They commissioned tests, and the test specs became the de facto curriculum, and they were much narrower than a curriculum should be.” For the new Common Core State Standards to be successful, Fuhrman wrote in Education Week in 2009, “educators and policymakers in the states, or in groups of states, will need to flesh out the new standards with curricula that specify desired pathways through the subject matter that will lead to mastery of the standards.”

== University of Pennsylvania ==
In 1995 Fuhrman was named Dean of the University of Pennsylvania's Graduate School of Education (Penn GSE) and the school's George and Diane Weiss Professor of Education. Her scholarship focused on enhancing the quality of education research, accountability in education, standards-based reform and intergovernmental relationships. Her published books during this period included Designing Coherent Education Policy (1993); Redesigning Accountability Systems for Education (2004), co-edited with Richard Elmore; and “The State of Education Policy Research,” co-authored with David Cohen and Fritz Mosher (2006).

As Dean of Penn GSE, Fuhrman was seen “as a driving force in the School’s increased engagement in local urban schools and in international education. Her dedication to rigorous research and practical reform was reflected in the quadrupling of externally funded research at GSE” and when she left for Teachers College, almost half of the School's standing tenure track faculty had been hired during her tenure.”

Fuhrman broadened Penn GSE’s involvement with schools in under-served communities in West Philadelphia. Under University of Pennsylvania President Judith Rodin, Fuhrman spearheaded the creation of the Sadie Tanner Mosell Alexander School, a university-backed pre-K-8 public school named for the first African-American woman to receive a law degree at the University of Pennsylvania. The school sends most of its graduates on to selective high schools.

Following the state takeover of the Philadelphia school system, Fuhrman also led Penn GSE in setting up partnerships with three low-performing schools in its West Philadelphia neighborhood, where it has been able to drive significant gains in student achievement. This work convinced Fuhrman that universities in general are ideal partners for local public schools.

== Teachers College ==
Fuhrman became the first female President of Teachers College in spring 2006, but she sounded the themes that would guide her administration the year before in a keynote speech delivered at the annual meeting of the American Association of Colleges for Teacher Education.

“We cannot demonstrate that we have a sound knowledge base for teacher education, that we know how to prepare teachers well, and that our preparation is essential for good teaching,” she said. “We must take responsibility for shoring up the research base, for providing evidence about effectiveness that will enable us to assure that our practices are sound.”

In an interview with the New York Times, Dr. Fuhrman said that she intended to bring some of CPRE's work on school reform and management to Teachers College, and that she hoped to expand the college's involvement with New York's public school system.

=== Research, Practice and Policy Goals ===
Teachers College has hired more than 50 new tenure-track faculty members since Fuhrman's arrival, representing roughly one-third of its current faculty. An in-house seed fund has backed more than 100 cross-disciplinary faculty research projects. During that same period, TC has launched new programs in learning analytics, diabetes care and management, executive change management, creative technologies, global competence in teaching, and spirituality and psychology. And the college has seen a 30% rise in financial aid and the beginning of doctoral support efforts.

Following up on her public school outreach at Penn, Fuhrman, in one of her first acts at Teachers College, established a new Office of School and Community Partnerships to centralize the college's work in New York City. In 2011 TC created the Teachers College Community School in West Harlem, which reflects the input of TC faculty in math, science, music, psychology, nutrition, reading and writing, physical education and art. TC students serve as specialty and pre-service teachers, after-school instructors, classroom assistants and psychological counseling and literacy interns. In 2013–14, 85 percent of students at TCCS performed at or above grade level in literacy in math, and the school led its district in applications for kindergarten seats.

TCCS now anchors REACH (Raising Educational Achievement Coalition of Harlem), through which TC partners with six local K-12 public to help improve educational outcomes for children.

Another top priority for Fuhrman at TC has been the expansion of the college's international alliances, particularly working together with Columbia University's Centers of Global Excellence. In 2009, Fuhrman created a new Office of International Affairs., through which TC has launched major partnerships with Jordan's Queen Rania Teacher Academy, the Khemka Foundation in India, China's Beijing University; and Pakistan's Ministry of Education.

In 2011, the college created a new Department of Education Policy and Social Analysis (EPSA) as a central hub for education policy faculty who had been scattered across a range of disciplines and departments. EPSA houses four masters and doctoral programs – Economics and Education, Politics and Education, and Sociology and Education and the college's Leadership Policy and Politics program – and collaborates extensively with other units of the college. The department is also home to the college's Annual Phyllis L. Kossoff Lecture on Education and Policy, which has included a debate between the two presidential nominees’ education advisers in fall 2012; a major policy address by U.S. Secretary of Education Arne Duncan; a roundtable featuring New York State Regents Chancellor Merryl Tisch (Ed.D. ’05); and policy addresses by two New York City public school chancellors — Dennis Walcott in 2011 and Carmen Fariña in 2014.

In fall 2013, Fuhrman announced the launch of an historic $300 million campaign – “Where the Future Comes First: The Campaign for Teachers College” – the largest campaign ever undertaken for a graduate school of education. Financial support for students is the highest priority. As of April, 2015, the Campaign was just shy of the $200 million mark, including more than $48 million raised to support student scholarships and fellowships.

=== Faculty Controversy Leads to Increased Diversity Efforts ===
At the start of Fuhrman's tenure as Teachers College President in August, 2006, she faced a contentious set of issues involving Professor Madonna Constantine, who had been Chair of the Department of Counseling and Clinical Psychology. When Constantine went on sabbatical in January 2006, faculty had elected Suniya S. Luthar to replace her. Luthar was told of several instances of plagiarism by Constantine, and had conveyed these to the Dean at the time, Darlyne Bailey. As Bailey left Teachers College for the University of Minnesota and Fuhrman took over as president, Fuhrman hired an external team of lawyers to investigate charges against Constantine. Reportedly, the investigation was handled by a law firm rather than a faculty committee because the administration feared that any missteps could open the college to litigation.

After months of investigation, the law firm spoke to Constantine in August 2007 to get her version of the story. A few months later as the college was close to releasing results of the investigation, a noose appeared on Constantine's office door. Someone blamed Luthar to the police and media. Fuhrman told the New York Times that she had "heard nothing but accolades" about Professor Constantine from her students. Regarding Luthar, Fuhrman told the New York Post that "the dispute between the two women...started more than a year ago. I’m not going to speculate on this investigation and its connection to this [incident]. I’d be outraged and horrified if it was connected.” Several days later, Fuhrman expressed regret, in her State of the college address, that "...in an effort to protect (Professor Luthar's) privacy, and under legal advice not to comment about her in response to any questions about the incident, even when asked specifically about her -- we didn't offer her the public support she deserves".

In February 2008, conclusions from an 18-month investigation by the law firm were that Madonna Constantine had in fact plagiarized the work of others. Reprimanded for multiple instances of plagiarism, Constantine was to face unspecified sanctions at the college.

In a formal grievance to the Teachers College Faculty Advisory Committee (FAC) dated March 11. 2008, Constantine indicated that she was exercising her right to appeal both the law firm's findings and the college's sanctions, and she alleged unequal treatment by President Fuhrman. The FAC conducted their own investigatory process between March and May 2008, and in a written document dated June 4, 2008, indicated that Constantine's appeal was not "substantiated." In a letter dated June 12, 2008, Constantine's appointment at Teachers College was officially terminated.

Constantine filed a lawsuit against Teachers College in October 2008, alleging that her termination was "arbitrary, irrational, and unauthorized," but the suit was "disposed". She then filed a defamation lawsuit against Teachers College in April 2009. In March 2010, she lost one of three lawsuits against the college. In March, 2012 — six years after concerns about plagiarism were first raised at Teachers College—the New York State Supreme Court affirmed the dismissal of Madonna Constantine's defamation lawsuits against Teachers College and others.

Following these incidents, Fuhrman focused the school more intensely on improving the climate around diversity. Building on the previous work of its Office for Diversity and Community Affairs, the college instituted sensitivity training and held town hall meetings. More recently TC has introduced a new certificate program in Sexuality, Women & Gender and a concentration in bilingual, Latina/o mental health services.

=== Issues Regarding Bonuses and Board Membership ===
At a faculty meeting in May 2013, the Teachers College faculty voted to reject the college's proposed 2013-2014 budget. This vote arose from the discovery, by TC's Faculty Executive Committee, that senior administrators were to receive bonuses from the college's 2011-12 budget surplus, with a total amount of $315,000 to be distributed. Of this amount, Fuhrman reportedly was to receive $90,000, and Vice President for Finance and Administration Harvey Spector was to receive $50,000. Some faculty and students voiced opposition to the proposed bonuses, especially in light of the administration's proposal to include a tuition increase of 4.5% in the budget for the 2013-14 fiscal year

Soon after the May 2013 faculty meeting, a group of students wrote a letter strongly criticizing President Fuhrman for her association with the for-profit company Pearson Education, and for her decision to bestow a 2013 Medal for Distinguished Services to NYS Board of Regents Chancellor Merryl Tisch who has been a proponent of standardized testing. At that time, Fuhrman serves on Pearson's board, and reportedly owned $272,088 in Pearson stock in May 2013. New York State's had recently adopted Pearson's Teacher Performance Assessment in order to be considered for certification, with each teacher's assessment entailing a fee of $300 to Pearson. When Merryl Tisch spoke at the 2013 graduation ceremonies, some students staged a quiet protest, holding up signs that said, “NOT A TEST SCORE.”

Fuhrman's responses to these various concerns were delineated in a letter sent to the Teachers College community. She noted that performance-based bonuses are common at colleges across the country and at TC, bonuses are calculated and awarded "solely by the Board of Trustees and not by the administrators"; at the same time, she indicated that during "this times of financial uncertainty", she would ask the Trustees to forgo giving bonuses to her and other senior staff. Regarding her service on the Pearson board which ended at the close of her term in 2013, Fuhrman indicated that the TC Board of Trustees had reviewed this service (which had commenced before her tenure as TC president), and believed that it was beneficial for educators' perspectives to be represented in private sector entities involved in education. Regarding the medal for Tisch, she said, "Whether one agrees with specific aspects of the chancellor’s policies, her positive impact on the lives of New Yorkers is evident in her many accomplishments in public education over the years as well as her enormous contributions in health, human services, and the arts."

=== National Academy of Education ===
Fuhrman served as President of the National Academy of Education (NAEd) from 2009 to 2013, succeeding Lorrie Shepard of the University of Colorado at Boulder. She convened a national conversation in the new field of learning analytics, which seeks to mine and analyze data generated by adaptive education technologies. In a series of meetings that drew scholars and researchers from all over the world, Fuhrman sought to establish a common framework for sharing and analyzing this wealth of information, and for protecting the privacy of students and their families.
