= Arthur M. Langer =

American academic (born 1953)

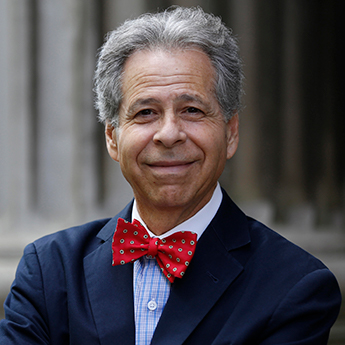
- Born: August 6, 1953 (age 73); Bronx, New York, U.S.
- Occupations: Academic, technology and workforce development expert, consultant
- Known for: Strategic Information Technology: Best Practices to Drive Digital Transformation; Information Technology and Organizational Learning; Guide to Software Development: Designing and Managing the Life Cycle
- Title: Founder and Chairman, Workforce Opportunity Services; Vice Provost, Northeastern University; Professor of Professional Practice at Columbia University

Academic background
- Education: B.A., Queens College; MBA, Iona College; Ed.D., Columbia University

Academic work
- Discipline: Business, Information technology and Workforce development
- Institutions: Northeastern University, Columbia University
- Website: www.alanger.com

Arthur M. Langer is an American academic whose work focuses on the effect of technology on organizational structure, behavior and workforce development. Langer is a Vice Provost at Northeastern University, Director of the Center for Technology Management and Digital Leadership, and Professor of Practice at the D'Amore-McKim School of Business Additionally, he is a faculty member in the Department of Organization and Leadership at the Teachers College Graduate School of Education. In 2005, Langer founded Workforce Opportunity Services (WOS), a nonprofit organization that trains and places underserved and Veteran job seekers into long-term careers.

== Early life and education ==
Arthur Langer was born to Eastern European immigrant parents in the Bronx, New York. He did not plan to go to college until he was mentored by a local businessman who offered him a scholarship on condition that he apply to the city's selective high schools. Langer attended The High School of Music and Art, followed by night school at Queens College, where he received his bachelor's degree in Computer Science. His MBA is from Iona College, and he earned his Doctorate in Education at Columbia University.

== Career ==
Prior to joining the full-time faculty at Columbia, Langer was Executive Director of Computer Support Services at Coopers and Lybrand, General Manager and Partner of Software Plus, and President and founder of Macco Software.

Langer teaches courses in information technology, human development, leadership, management, and higher education at Columbia University. He also consults for corporations and universities on these topics as well as on staff development, management transformation, and curriculum. In his teaching, Langer developed a “theory-to-practice-to-theory” (TPT) approach in order to help adult students engage in transformative learning. TPT underscores that adults learn best when they can relate theory to their experiences, and then revisit theory for its applicability to their personal situations. Students then determine through personal critical reflection whether and how to modify their existing belief systems. By consistently providing students with critical feedback and multiple opportunities to apply new concepts as well as revise their work, TPT helps them gradually examine where their new knowledge can be integrated with their existing ideologies.

== Notable publications ==
=== Books ===
- Analysis and Design of Next-Generation Software Architectures (2020) Information Technology and Organizational Learning (3rd Edition, 2018),
- Guide to Software Development: Designing & Managing the Life Cycle (2nd Edition, 2016), Strategic IT: Best Practices for Managers and Executives (2013 with Lyle Yorks)
- Analysis and Design of Information Systems (2008),
- Applied Ecommerce (2002),
- The Art of Analysis (1997).
- Information Technology and Organizational learning: Managing Behavioral Change in the Digital Age, 4th Edition, 2024. CRC Press. ISBN 978-1-032-32627-6
- Developing a Path to Data Dominance: Strategies for Digital Data-Centric Enterprises, with Arka Mukherjee, 2023, ISBN 978-3-031-26400-9

=== Articles ===
- “Designing the digital organization” (with C. Snow and O. Feljstad in Journal of Organizational Design 2017),
- “Cyber security: The new business opportunity facing executives” (Cyber Security Review 2016),
- "Employing Young Talent from Underserved Populations: Designing a Flexible Organizational Process for Assimilation and Productivity." in the Journal of Organization Design.
- Fantasy and Adult Development. The Journal of Aesthetic Education.

== Workforce Opportunity Services ==
In 2001, as part of the Workplace Literacy Program, Langer launched The Inner-City Workplace Literacy Study at Columbia University. The study included more than 40 low-income adults from Harlem, and it investigated how to prepare them for roles in information technology given their lack of experience in this field. The project identified challenges they faced as they trained to compete in the job market and showed that in order to successfully integrate underrepresented talent into the workforce, programs must merge technical training with teaching interpersonal and self-esteem building skills. As he carried out the Literacy Study, Langer developed the Langer Workforce Maturity Arc (LWMA), a tool designed to measure the job readiness of adult learners from underserved communities. Inspired by his own coming of age in the Bronx, Langer founded Workforce Opportunity Services (WOS) in 2005 to provide mentoring and workforce training opportunities to people from underserved communities and underrepresented groups. Today Workforce Opportunity Services creates custom training programs – along with mentorship and material as well as social supports - that deliver a pipeline of early-career talent to employers from under-represented populations, including military Veterans and spouses. As of April 2021, WOS has served over 5,300 individuals through partnerships with more than 65 corporations in 60+ locations worldwide.
