= Marie L. Miville =

American psychologist and educator

Marie L. Miville is an American psychologist and educator. She is an associate professor of psychology and education, currently involved in a counseling psychology program at Columbia University. Before joining Columbia, Miville worked as an associate professor in the Counseling Psychology Program at Oklahoma State University. Her work revolves around identifying needs and perceptions of international students, LGBT students and students with disabilities. Her primary focus is racial and gender differences at the collegiate level. Miville has published many works on multi-cultural issues in psychology. She works as an editor for a psychology counseling forum.

== Research/publications ==
=== Chameleon Changes: An Exploration of Racial Identity Themes of Multiracial People (2005) ===
This study was conducted by four psychologists and "explored essential themes of racial identity development among 10 self-identified multiracial adults from a variety of backgrounds." In the study, participants were chosen through a half-structured protocol, interviewed in a recorded session. Four themes were identified through this experiment: encounters with racism, reference group orientation, the "chameleon" experience and the importance of social context in identity development. The study concluded, "several of the themes mirrored those associated with contemporary biracial and multiracial identity development models, new themes centering on the adoption of multiple self-labels reflecting both monoracial and multiracial backgrounds emerged as well."

=== Case Studies in Multicultural Counseling and Therapy (2014) ===
The case study was a literary piece that discusses cases of clinical counseling and psychotherapy. This work covers the various assessments and treatments of people in different populations. It contains contributions from practicing psychologists. It intended to empower other professions to take an interest in multicultural counseling.

=== Factor Structure and Short Form of the Miville- Guzman Universality- Diversity Scale ===
This piece focuses on three studies that concern the Miville- Guzman Universality- Diversity scale. This work discusses the "validity of the Therapeutic Factors Inventory-Short Form (TFI-S)."

=== Handbook of Race-Ethnicity and Gender in Psychology ===
The Handbook focuses on multicultural aspects of psychology, and received recognition for bringing attention to the nuances of diversity. It focuses on the diversity scale and the "intersections of gender or social class with race-ethnicity". This handbook is praised for its incorporation of "multiple aspects of diversity within psychology" as well as providing information on how race and gender can impact psychology and how research regarding topics such as mental health, domestic violence, and addiction can be more thoroughly observed with a broader understanding of their effects on individuals and groups. The topics of interest include identity development, world-views and belief systems, parenting styles, interventions for promoting resilience and persistence, and strategies for enhancing more accurate diagnostic and treatment modalities. The research and themes covered in the book are applicable to many fields in psychology. The handbook is said to have touched on many unnoticed/under-addressed topics.

=== Selected publications ===
- Miville, Marie; Sue, D; Gallardo, M; Neville, H. "Case studies in multicultural counseling and therapy". Wiley.com.
- Miville, Marie; So-Lloyd, Gloria; Baysden, Matthew; Constantine, Madonna. "Chameleon Changes: An Exploration of Racial Identity Themes of Multiracial People" (PDF). Wikispaces.
- Miville, Marie; Fuertes, Jairo; Mohr, Jonathan; Gretchen, Denise. "Factor Structure and Short Form of the Miville- Guzman Universality- Diversity Scale" (PDF).
- Mivile, Marie; Ferguson, Angela (6 February 2014). Handbook of Race-Ethnicity and Gender in Psychology. Springer-Verlag New York. ISBN 9781461488590.
