= Barbara C. Wallace =

American psychologist

Barbara C. Wallace is a clinical psychologist and the first African-American woman tenured professor at Teachers College of Columbia University. She is a fellow of the American Psychological Association within divisions 50 (addictive behaviors) and 45 (Society for the Psychological Study of Ethnic Minority Issues). She is also editor-in-chief of the Journal of Equity in Health.

Wallace is a professor of health education, director of the Research Group on Disparities in Health, and director of Global HELP (Health Education and Leadership Program) within the Department of Health and Behavior Studies, Teachers College, Columbia University. Her psychology practice specializes in addiction treatment, chemical dependency, dual diagnoses, various forms of trauma, violence and abuse, and multicultural diversity training. Her research focuses on local and global health disparities; training of global leaders in health education and promotion; closing the inter-related education and health gaps through effective engagement of students in the classroom, supplementary education, and peer mentoring/tutoring programs for at risk students; HIV and AIDS prevention; violence prevention; trauma resolution; addictions and dependencies research; and relapse prevention for problem behaviors. She currently co-directs the Center for Health Equity and Urban Science Education . with Dr. Christopher Emdin

== Biography and career ==
Dr. Wallace was born in Philadelphia, Pennsylvania, where she attended the Masterman Laboratory and Demonstration School and the Philadelphia High School for Girls (PHSG). At the PHSG, she served as high school president during her senior year and vice president during her junior year. She obtained an AB degree in psychology and a certificate in Afro-American studies from Princeton University (1980), an MA in psychology from City College of the City University of New York (1984), and a PhD in clinical psychology from the City University of New York (1985), where she won honors for the best dissertation in clinical psychology for that academic year. She completed her post-doctoral training in addiction research at NDRI (formerly Narcotic and Drug Research, Inc.).

As staff psychologist at Interfaith Medical Center in Brooklyn at the height of the crack cocaine epidemic, Wallace pioneered an original treatment approach for crack cocaine dependence and helped to launch in 1986 the first specialized crack cocaine treatment unit in the New York metropolitan region. In 1988, Wallace became assistant professor in the Department of African American Studies at John Jay College of Criminal Justice, City University of New York, where she helped to launch the college's first mandatory freshman course on race and ethnicity. In 1990, Wallace joined Teachers College, Columbia University, where in 1994, she became the first African American woman to gain tenure in the 100-year history of Teachers College. Wallace now holds the rank of tenured full professor of health education at Teachers College, Columbia University, where she is the only African American female tenured full professor. Wallace has graduated historically unprecedented large cohorts of new doctorates in health education from unrepresented groups including international students.

In 2000, Wallace was enstooled (being placed in a position as an African traditional royal) as a queen mother, being given the formal title of the Abradehemaa of Larteh-Kubease, Akuapem, Ghana, Africa. In Ghana, enstoolment represents one of the highest honors in recognition of outstanding leadership and service. As the enstooled abradehemaa or queen mother, she is known as Nana Ohemaa Agyiriwa II. As such, she serves as queen mother of the Asona and Aberade clan families of the United States and Larteh-Kubease, Akuapem, Ghana, West Africa. Her decade of service as a queen mother, thus far, has been marked by active philanthropy; she has assisted in improving and building schools in Africa, shipping donations of books and learning aids abroad, sponsoring scholarships to fund the education of African children, training HIV and AIDS peer educators, and directing the Larteh Schools Task Force in establishing priorities for use of donations and funding within their local schools.

Wallace is founding director of the Annual Health Disparities Conference at Teachers College, held in March from 2006 to 2009 as a two-day national conference.

In introducing her 2008 edited volume (Toward Equity in Health: A New Global Approach to Health Disparities), Wallace speaks in the preface of launching a new field of equity in health and seeking to spur a global movement in response to the major civil rights issue of the 21st century involving injustice in health.

Wallace has trained HIV and AIDS prevention peer educators and community health workers using culturally-appropriate evidence-based programs in Jamaica, West Indies; Kenya, East Africa, and New Delhi, India. Her global contributions include supervising and funding the training of HIV and AIDS prevention peer educators and community health workers in Sierra Leone, West Africa (2005); Ghana, West Africa (2006); Pennsylvania, USA (2007); Haiti, Caribbean (2008); Togo, West Africa (2008); and, New Delhi, India (2009).
