= Suniya S. Luthar =

American academic, educator, psychologist (1958-2023)

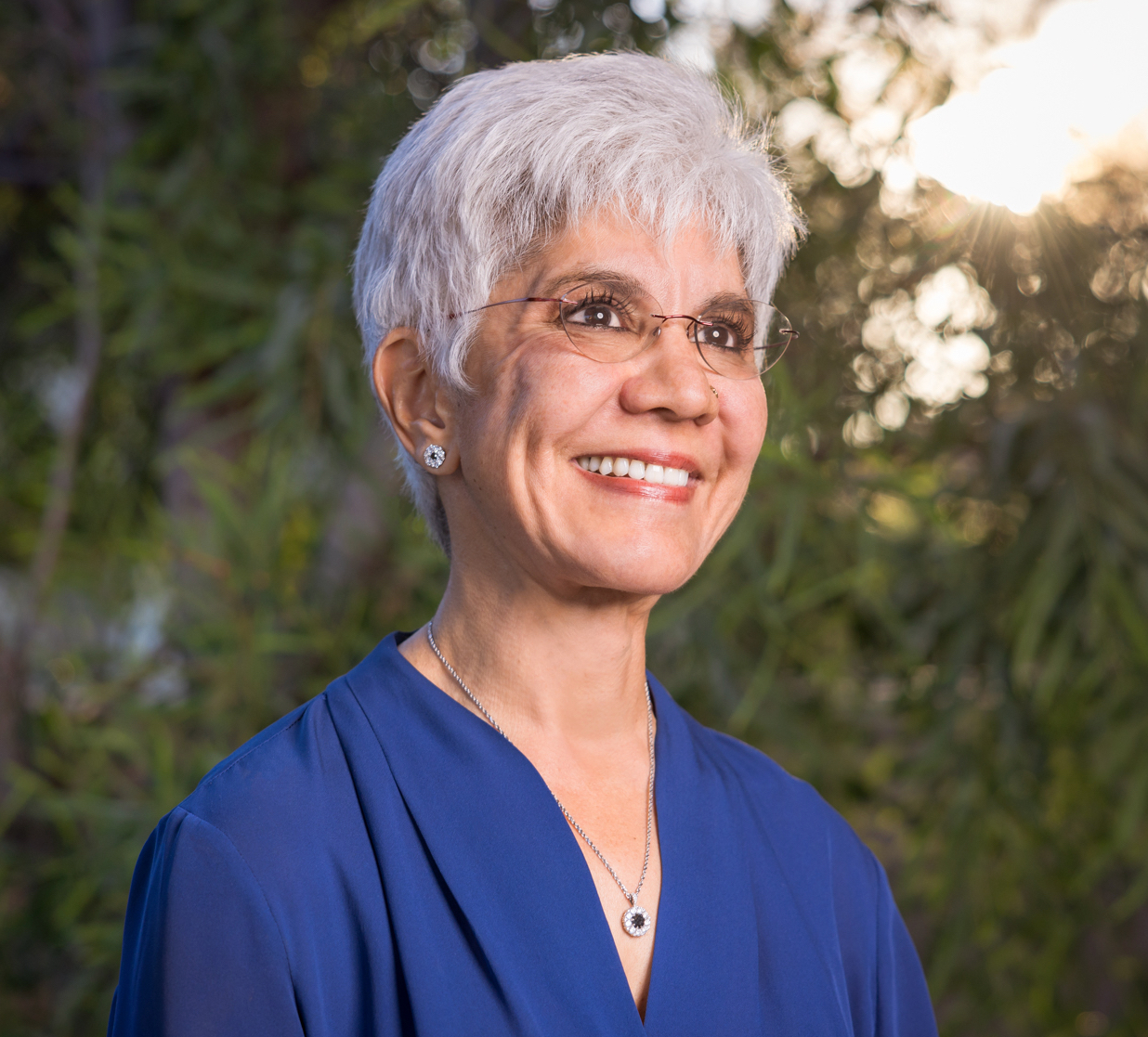
- Luthar in 2022
- Born: December 9, 1958; New Delhi, India
- Died: February 16, 2023 (aged 64); Arizona, U.S.
- Education: Lady Irwin College (BS, MS); Yale University (PhD)
- Children: 2

Suniya S. Luthar (December 10, 1958 - February 16, 2023) was an Indian-American psychologist who founded and was executive director of the nonprofit AC Groups, professor emerita at Teachers College-Columbia University, and co-founder Emerita at Authentic Connections Co. She had previously served on the faculty at Yale University's Department of Psychiatry and the Yale Child Study Center and as foundation professor of psychology at the Arizona State University.

== Education and early career ==
Luthar earned her bachelor's and master's degrees in child development, in 1978 and 1980 respectively, from the Lady Irwin College of Delhi University, India. In 1990, she received a PhD in clinical and developmental psychology from Yale University. She completed a clinical internship at the Yale Child Study Center and then was on the faculty at the Yale University School of Medicine's Department of Psychiatry and Child Study Center, first as an associate research scientist (1990–92), then as assistant professor (1992–97). Luthar joined Teachers College, Columbia University in 1997 as an associate professor. She received tenure in 1999 and was promoted to full professor in 2001. In 2010, she was named professor adjunct at the Yale Child Study Center. The following year, she was appointed senior advisor to the provost at Teachers College, Columbia University. Between January 2014 and Dec 2019, she was foundation professor at Arizona State University's Psychology Department.

== Research ==
Luthar's research involves vulnerability and resilience among various populations including youth in poverty and children in families affected by mental illness. Her studies of adolescents in high achieving schools (HASs), usually in relatively affluent communities, have revealed elevated problems in several areas, particularly substance use and emotional distress. This pattern of elevated problems has now been documented among students at both public and private schools and in different geographical regions of the United States.

Luthar's programmatic work on HAS youth has now brought national recognition, in major policy reports, that this group is among those at heightened risk for adjustment difficulties. In a 2018 Robert Wood Johnson Foundation report on adolescent wellness, environments listed as compromising youth well-being included exposure to poverty, trauma, and discrimination as well as excessive pressures to achieve, usually seen in affluent communities. In a 2019 report by the National Academies of Science, Education, and Medicine, youth in HASs were again listed among those especially vulnerable along with children in deep poverty, those in the foster care system, and those with incarcerated parents.

In considering factors that promote resilience among highly pressured youth, Luthar's research pointed to the protective effects of close, supportive relationships with parents (especially mothers who are generally primary caregivers), and appropriate and consistent limit-setting by parents, particularly with regard to misuse of drugs and alcohol. Also critical are perceptions of balanced values among adults in their homes, schools, and communities, such that they are perceived as valuing children's personal decency and integrity at least as much as they value the splendor of their accomplishments. In their most recent works, Luthar and collaborators have presented conceptual models encompassing multiple risk and protective factors affecting HAS youth, including influences related to families and peer groups, aspects of school climate, as well as societal factors such as the middle class squeeze and extreme competitiveness associated with college admissions.

Luthar's recent research has also focused on motherhood, with exploration of factors that best help mothers negotiate the challenges of this life-transforming role. Findings have highlighted the importance of four factors in particular: mothers feeling unconditionally loved themselves (as in the sentiment, "I feel seen and loved for the person I am, at my core"); feeling comforted when they are distressed; feeling authentic in close relationships (being their true selves, without having to pretend or conceal); and satisfaction with their friendships. These research-based insights have been harnessed within supportive group-based interventions aimed at fostering the resilience of mothers in their everyday lives. Luthar's Authentic Connections Groups intervention has been recognized, in the National Academies' 2019 report, as a promising approach to foster resilience among at-risk children and families.

Luthar's work has been widely cited in the national and international press, including outlets such as the New York Times, CNN, the Wall Street Journal, the Washington Post, NPR, and the Atlantic. Luthar's research has been supported by grants from the National Institutes of Health as well as the William T. Grant Foundation, the Spencer Foundation, the Smith Richardson Foundation, and the Rodel Foundation. Luthar regularly presents cutting-edge research findings on high achieving schools and families—and their implications for beneficial interventions—in schools, communities, and conferences, nationally and internationally.

== Department chair, Teachers College ==
In 2005, Luthar was elected by faculty colleagues to be chair of the Department of Counseling and Clinical Psychology at Teachers College, Columbia University, taking over for Professor Madonna Constantine, who was to go on sabbatical. In April 2009, the Asian Caucus of the Society for Research in Child Development honored Luthar with an award citing her “mentorship, courage, and integrity”. Teachers College designated Luthar as senior advisor to the provost in 2011, and in 2014, conferred the status of professor emerita.

== Honors and awards ==
Early scientific contributions were recognized by the American Psychological Association (APA) in the form of a Dissertation Award in 1990 (Division 37; Child, Youth, & Family Services), and the Boyd McCandless Young Scientist Award in 1998 (Division 7; Developmental Psychology). In 2006, Luthar was named Member of the New York Academy of Sciences, and named Fellow of the American Association for Psychological Science in recognition of her distinguished contributions to science. In September, 2015, she was named Fellow of the American Psychological Association's Divisions 7 and 37 (Society for Child and Family Policy and Practice). Other awards include a Research Scientist Development Award from the National Institute on Drug Abuse (1993), an American Mensa Education and Research Foundation Award for Excellence in Research on Intelligence (1995), and an award for Integrity and Mentorship from the Society for Research in Child Development (SRCD)'s Asian Caucus in 2009. In 2020, Luthar received the Society for Research on Adolescents' John P. Hill Memorial Award, recognizing the significant contributions of her programmatic research to understanding of development during the second decade of the lifespan.

Luthar served as chair of a grant peer review committee at the National Institutes of Health's Center for Scientific Review (2002–04), was elected member of the Governing Council of SRCD (2006–09), and chair of SRCD's Asian Caucus (2008–09). She served on the APA's Committee on Socioeconomic Status (2007–08), was elected to APA's Council of Representatives (Division 7) Developmental Psychology; 2013-16, and was elected to be President of APA's Division 7 (2019). Luthar was also among the experts of experts contributing to the National Academies' 2019 report, Vibrant and Healthy Kids: Aligning Science, Practice, and Policy to Advance Health Equity.

== Publications ==
In addition to peer-reviewed journal articles, Luthar's writing includes Children in poverty: Risk and protective forces in adjustment, Developmental psychopathology: Perspectives on adjustment, risk, and disorder, and Resilience and vulnerability in childhood: Adaptation in the context of adversities. She served as associate editor of the peer-reviewed journals Developmental Psychology (2004–07) and Development and Psychopathology (1999–present).
