= Derald Wing Sue =

American psychologist

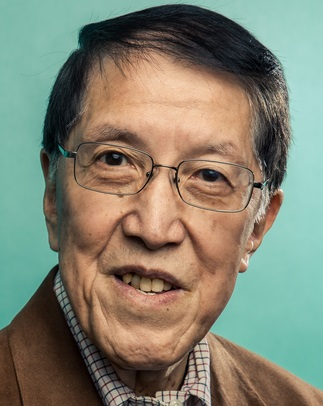
- Born: Portland, Oregon, U.S.
- Occupations: Professor, author
- Awards: APA Award for Lifetime Contributions to Psychology (2019)

Academic background
- Education: Oregon State University University of Oregon

Academic work
- Discipline: Psychology
- Sub-discipline: Counseling psychology
- Institutions: Columbia University
- Notable students: Kevin Nadal

Derald Wing Sue is a professor of counseling psychology at Columbia University. He has authored several books, including Counseling the Culturally Diverse: Theory and Practice, Overcoming our Racism, and Understanding Abnormal Behavior.

== Personal life ==
Derald Wing Sue was born in Portland, Oregon, into a Chinese American family." His family lived in a predominantly white neighborhood where he grew up with his parents, four brothers, and one sister.

He recalled being teased due to his ethnicity during his childhood.

Due to the lack of mentors interested in multiculturalism he turned to the writings of civil rights activists such as Martin Luther King Jr., Malcolm X, Huey Newton, H. Rap Brown, and Cesar Chavez for inspiration.

== Family ==
He married his wife Paulina in the 1960s. They have two children, Derald Paul and Marissa.

== Professional life ==
Derald Wing Sue was majoring in biology at Oregon State University when he took a psychology class and became fascinated by what he had learned. He switched to psychology and loved the classes he was taking but at a certain point he began to rebel and question the teachings that did not seem to match his own experiences. He believed that the theories in counseling and psychotherapy were class-bound and culture-bound. Sue obtained his bachelor's degree from Oregon State University, and then an MS and PhD in counseling psychology from the University of Oregon. In 1965 Sue was exposed to humanistic teachings by Leona Elizabeth Tyler, the past president of the American Psychological Association. Sue found the academic presence to be valid but that the curriculum was invalid because race and culture were rarely discussed other than in a superficial or intellectual way. After completing his degree, he became a counselor at the University of California, Berkeley counseling center, and was known as the counselor who supported Asian American students. During his time at Berkeley, he conducted mental health studies on Asian Americans, which led him to coauthor two books: A Theory of Multicultural Counseling and Therapy and Understanding Abnormal Behavior.

In 1972, Sue and his brother psychologist Stanley Sue cofounded the Asian American Psychological Association due to the lack of research on Asian American mental health. Derald Sue was the founding president of the organization.

In 1981, Sue published Counseling the Culturally Diverse: Theory and Practice. This book became a lightning rod for controversy because of his philosophy on multicultural counseling. The text contains revisions of previous writings Sue published on counseling barriers, counselors' credibility, and worldviews on counseling. In addition, the text emphasizes the understanding of the sociopolitical nature of counseling and counseling social justice. There is also a chapter on "Critical Incidents in Cross-Cultural Counseling" specifically aimed at "highlighting and illustrating crucial issues/concerns/decision points likely to arise in several cross-cultural counseling situations that involve people from different cultural/racial backgrounds".

In 1992, Sue, along with Patricia Arredondo and Roderick J. McDavis, published a framework establishing formal standards for multicultural competence in counseling. They called on the profession to require culturally responsive practice rather than treating it as optional. The framework has since become a common reference point in counselor education and training programs.

Sue became a professor because of his desire to teach and spread his ideas and awareness of multiculturalism. As a professor he attempted to create a cross-cultural counseling class and tried to fuse cultural concepts into all the courses that he taught, though he did receive backlash from students and faculty who believed that, regardless of cultural differences, good counseling was good counseling. His students found his teachings suspicious, defiant, and "politically correct." They challenged him for purely focusing on race and ethnicity in counseling. Sue responded to his students and, with each course that he taught, he developed more detailed theories and practices. Sue challenged his students to be committed to understanding multicultural counseling and become proactive in their techniques. However, they too received backlash from faculty and colleagues who stated that their behavior was unprofessional. Realizing the issues that his students were having, he encouraged them to seek allies and supporters for their multicultural counseling cause. In addition to being a professor of psychology at Teachers College, he served on Bill Clinton's President's advisory board on Race in 1996. He served as a past president of the Society for the Psychological Study of Ethnic Minority Issues, and the president of the Society of Counseling Psychology of the American Psychological Association.

In 1999, Sue co-founded the National Multicultural Conference and Summit (NMCS) along with Rosie Phillips Bingham, Lisa Porché-Burke, and Melba J. T. Vasquez. The inaugural conference was held in Newport Beach, California, and drew roughly 550 scientists, practitioners, scholars, and students to address the mental health needs of historically marginalized groups. The conference grew into a recurring biennial event and became one of the longest-running professional gatherings in psychology dedicated to advancing multiculturalism in the field.

In 2007, Sue and colleagues published a widely cited article introducing a taxonomy of racial microaggressions, the brief, everyday verbal, behavioral, or environmental slights that communicate hostile or derogatory messages toward marginalized groups, whether the person committing them intends harm or not. The article categorized these into three types: microassaults, microinsults, and microinvalidations. They argued that clinicians needed to recognize subtle, often unintentional bias as a legitimate source of psychological harm rather than dismissing it as oversensitivity. The work has become one of the most cited articles in multicultural psychology.

== Achievements and Awards ==
Apart from authoring multiple textbooks used in colleges, he has written over 150 publications on various topics such as multicultural counseling and psychotherapy, psychology of racism and antiracism, cultural diversity, cultural competence, and multicultural organizational development, but more specifically, multicultural competencies and the concept of microaggression.

In recognition of his contributions to the field, Sue received the APA's Award for Distinguished Senior Career Contributions to Psychology in the Public Interest in 2013 (Sue, 2013). Two years later, in 2015, he was awarded the APA's Gold Medal Award for Life Achievement in Psychology in the Public Interest, one of the association's highest honors.

== See also ==
- Cross-cultural psychiatry
- Cross-cultural psychology
- Racism in the United States
