= Teachers College, Columbia University =

Graduate school in New York City, New York, US

Coordinates: 40.8101°N 73.96107°W

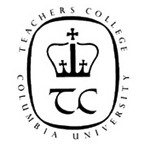
- Type: Private graduate school of education
- Established: 1887; 139 years ago
- Parent institution: Columbia University
- Endowment: $564.05 million (2025)
- President: Thomas R. Bailey
- Provost: KerryAnn O'Meara
- Students: 5,299
- Location: New York City, U.S.
- Campus: Urban
- Website: tc.columbia.edu
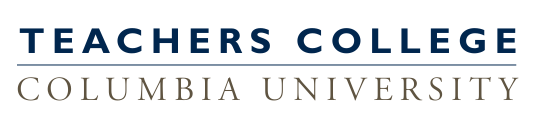

Teachers College, Columbia University (TC) is the graduate school of education of Columbia University, a private research university in New York City. Founded in 1887, Teachers College has been part of Columbia University since 1898.

== History ==
=== Founding and early history ===
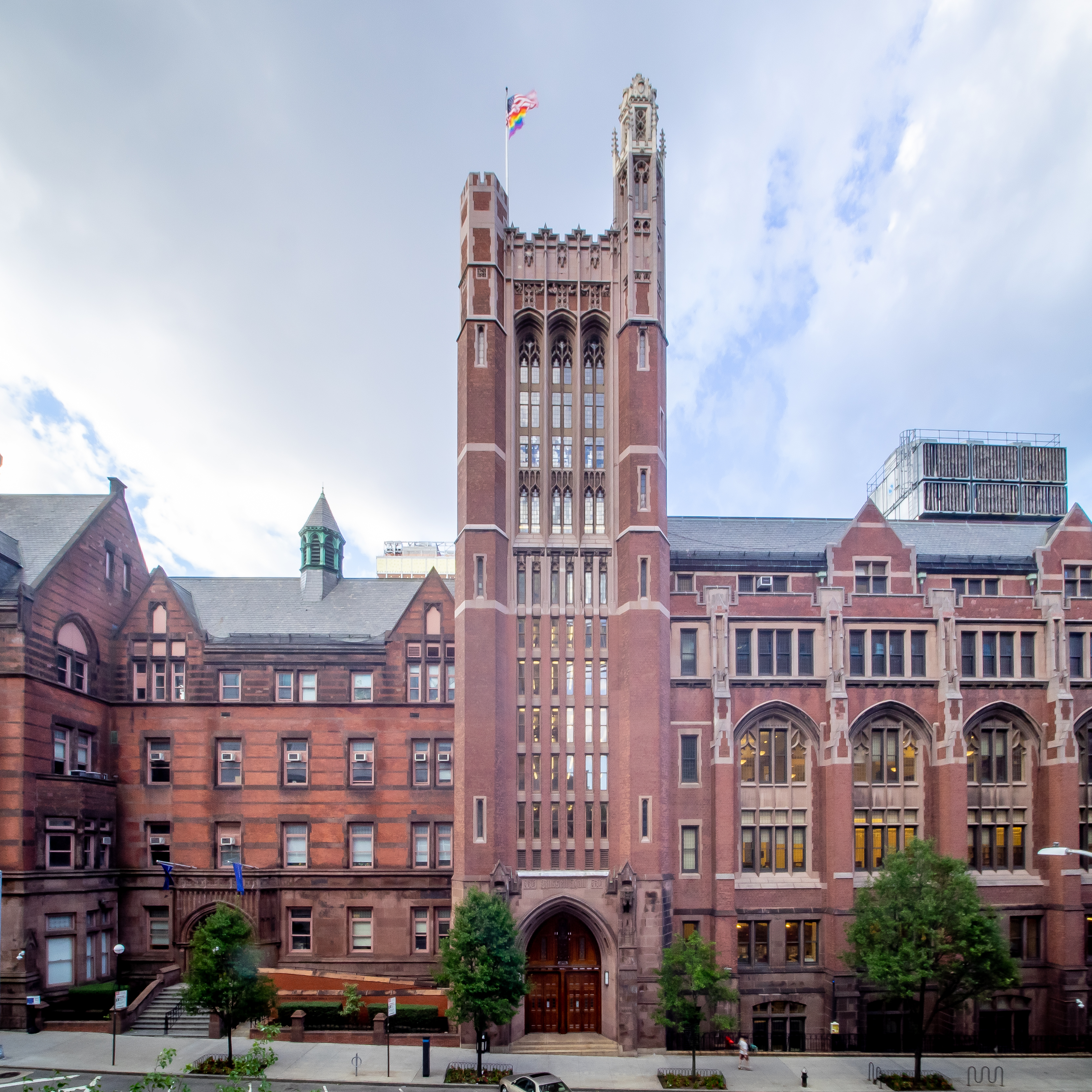
Russell Hall

Teachers College was the first graduate school in the United States whose curriculum focused specifically on teacher education.

In 1880, the Kitchen Education Association (KEA), also known as the Kitchen Garden Association, was founded by philanthropist Grace Hoadley Dodge, the daughter of wealthy businessman William Dodge. The association's focus was to replace miniature kitchen utensils for other toys that were age-appropriate for kindergarten-aged girls. In 1884, the KEA was rebranded to the Industrial Education Association (IEA), in the spirit of widening its mission to boys and parents. Three years later, it moved to the former Union Theological Seminary building on University Place, as well as founded a coeducational private school called the Horace Mann School.

In 1887, William Vanderbilt Jr. offered a substantial financial sum to the IEA. With the support of Dodge, Vanderbilt appointed Nicholas Murray Butler, the future longest-serving president of Columbia University and Nobel Peace Prize recipient, as new president of the IEA. The IEA decided to provide schooling for the teachers of the poor children of New York City. Thus, in 1887–1888, it employed six instructors and enrolled 36 juniors in its inaugural class as well as 86 special students. To reflect the broadening mission of education beyond the original philanthropic intent set forth by Dodge, the IEA changed its name to the New York School for the Training of Teachers, and received its temporary charter from the New York State Board of Regents.

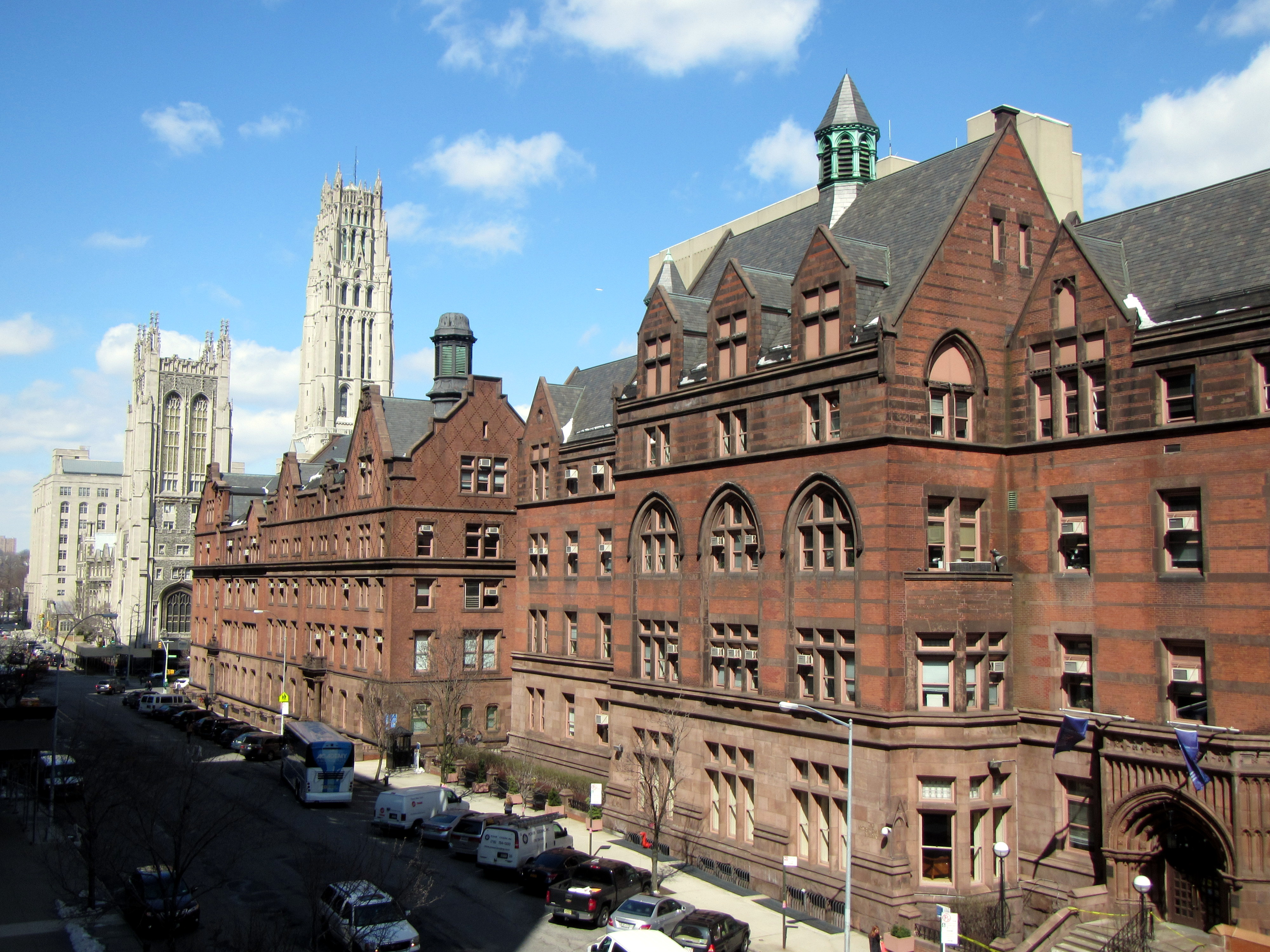
Teachers College buildings on Broadway and 120th St., looking northwest

By October 1890, the school's trustees were seeking a new campus, as the University Place campus was considered too small. After discussions with Columbia University president Seth Low, the trustees selected a site in Morningside Heights, near where Columbia's campus was being constructed. In 1892, the name of the New York School for the Training of Teachers was again changed to Teachers College. The following year, Teachers College and Columbia University became affiliated, and the trustees acquired land for the new campus in Morningside Heights. The original campus buildings, including Main Hall and Milbank Memorial Hall, were designed by William Appleton Potter. Additional buildings were later designed by Edgar A. Josselyn and Howells & Stokes (Horace Mann School), Parish & Schroeder (Thompson Hall and Dodge Hall), Bruce Price and J. M. Darragh (Whittier Hall), Allen & Collens (Russell Hall and Dodge Hall Extension), J. Gordon Carr (president's house), and Hugh Stubbins (Building 528). The first structure in the original complex, Main Hall, was completed in late 1894; Milbank Memorial Hall was finished three years later. The curriculum combined a humanitarian concern for helping others with a scientific approach to human development. The college was affiliated with Columbia University in 1898 as the university's Graduate School of Education. A new building for Horace Mann was erected in 1899, followed by the Frederick Ferris Thompson Memorial Hall in 1902–1904. In addition, a four-wing dormitory building, Whittier Hall, was constructed in 1900–1901. Enrollment increased rapidly; the graduating class of 1911 included 686 students, compared with 26 students in the first graduating class.

=== Expansion of scope ===
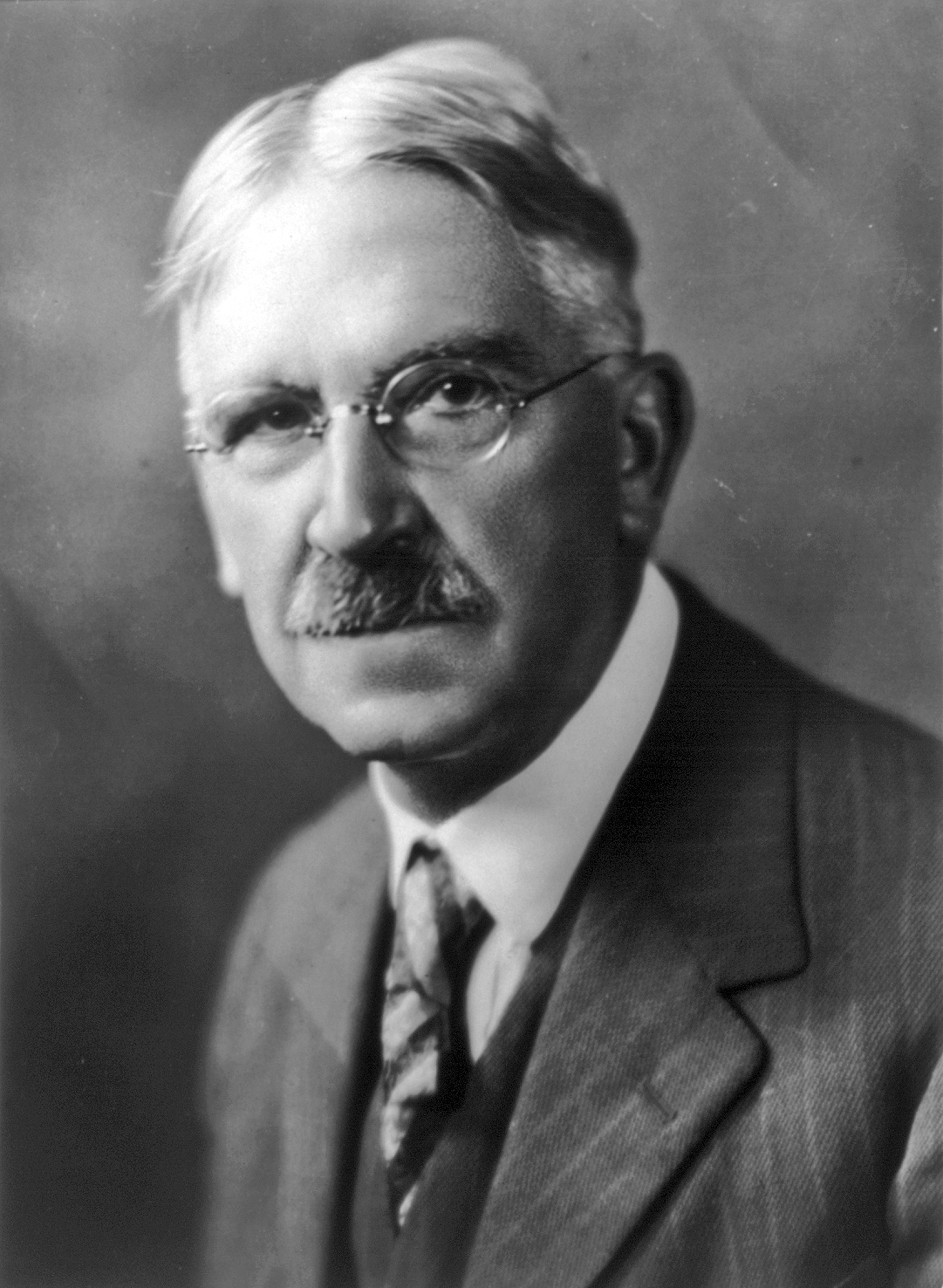
John Dewey

The founders early recognized that professional teachers require reliable knowledge about the conditions under which children learn most effectively. As a result, the college's program included from the outset fundamental subjects such as educational psychology and educational sociology. The founders also emphasized that education must be combined with clear ideas about ethics and the nature of a good society; consequently, programs were developed in the history of education and comparative education. As the number of schoolchildren increased during the twentieth century, the challenges of managing schools became increasingly complex. The college responded by establishing programs of study in areas such as administration, economics, and politics. Other programs emerged in fields including clinical and counseling psychology, organizational psychology, developmental psychology, cognitive psychology, curriculum development, instructional technology, media studies, and school health care. Teachers College, Columbia University, was also associated with philosopher and public intellectual John Dewey, who served as president of the American Psychological Association and the American Philosophical Association and was a professor at Teachers College from 1904 until his retirement in 1930.

In 1931, Estelle Massey Osborne became the first African-American nurse in the U.S. to earn an M.A. in nursing education.

=== Presidents ===
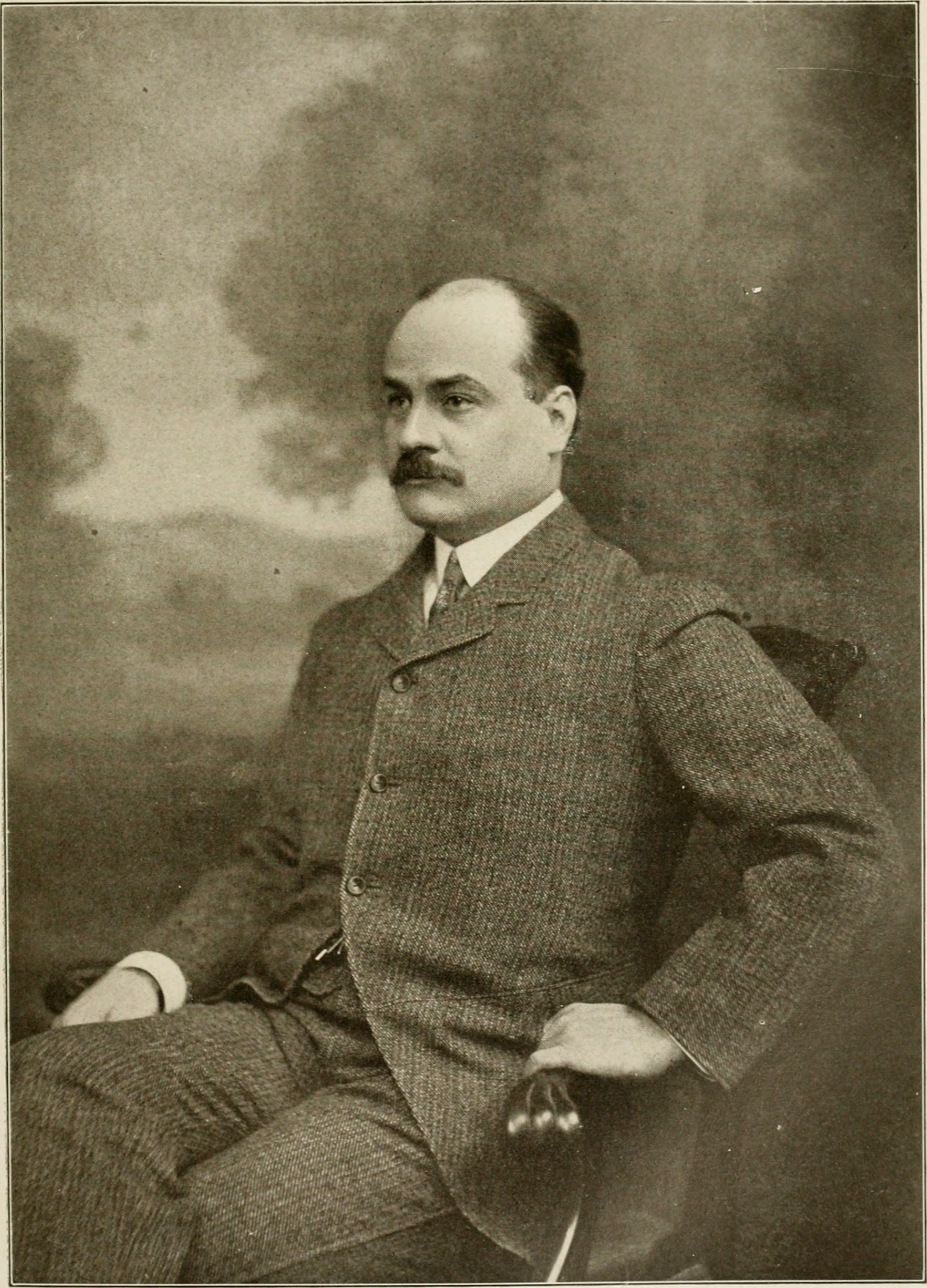
Nicholas Murray Butler

	President	Tenure
1.	Nicholas M. Butler	1889–1891
2.	Walter L. Hervey	1891–1897
3.	James Earl Russell	1898–1926
4.	William Fletcher Russell	1927–1954
5.	Hollis L. Caswell	1954–1962
6.	John Henry Fischer	1962–1974
7.	Lawrence A. Cremin	1974–1984
8.	Philip M. Timpane	1984–1994
9.	Arthur E. Levine	1994–2006
10.	Susan Fuhrman	2006–2018
11.	Thomas R. Bailey	2018–present

== Academics ==
The school offers Master of Arts (M.A.), Master of Education (Ed.M.), Master of Science (M.S.), Doctor of Education (Ed.D.), and Doctor of Philosophy (PhD) degrees in over sixty programs of study. Despite the college's name, less than one-third of students are preparing to become teachers. Graduates pursue careers, for example, in the social sciences, health and health promotion, educational policy, technology, international and comparative education, as well as educational leadership.

According to former Teachers College president Susan Fuhrman, the school provides solutions to the difficult problems of urban education, reaffirming its original mission in providing a new kind of education for those left most in need by society or circumstance. The college continues its collaborative research with urban and suburban school systems that strengthen teaching in such fundamental areas as reading, writing, science, mathematics, and the arts; prepares leaders to develop and administer psychological and health care programs in schools, businesses, hospitals and community agencies; and advances technology for the classroom, developing new teaching software and keeping teachers abreast of new developments.

Teachers College also houses a wide range of applied psychology degrees, including one of the nation's leading programs in organizational psychology. Every year captains from the United States Military Academy at West Point are selected for the Eisenhower Leader Development Program (ELDP) and complete the Organizational Psychology M.A. program to become tactical officers (TAC) at West Point.

The college also houses programs in anthropology. It was foundational in the development of the field of anthropology and education. By the 1930s, Teachers College had begun to offer courses in anthropology as part of the foundations of education. By 1948 Margaret Mead started what would be a long association with Teachers College where she taught until the early 1970s. In 1953 Solon Kimball joined the faculty. In 1954 nine professors (including Mead and Solon Kimball) came together to discuss the topic. In the 1960s, these people formed the Council on Anthropology and Education within the American Anthropological Association, and it is still considered as the leading organization in the field.

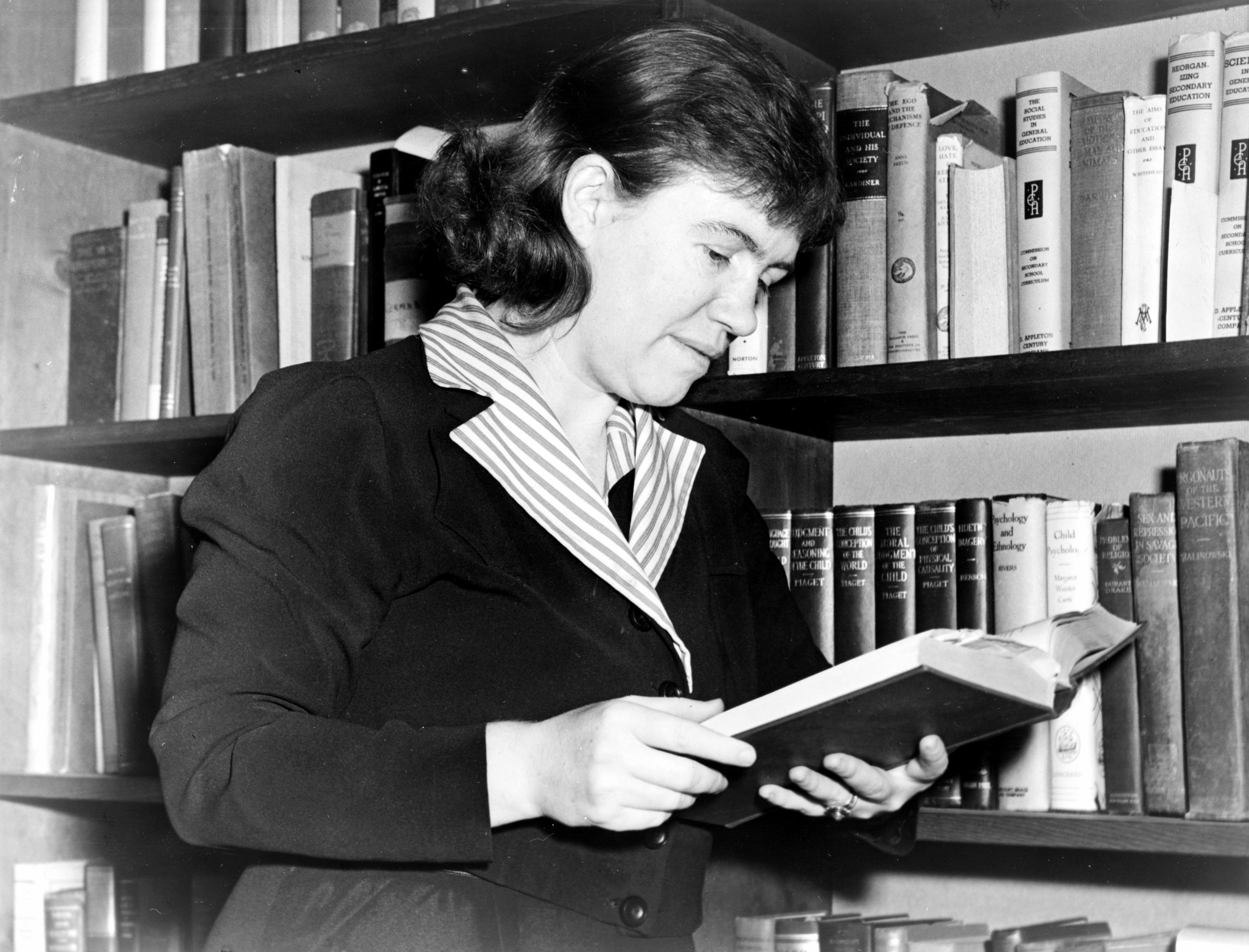
Margaret Mead, became President of the American Anthropological Association in 1960

The student experience at Teachers College is governed by a student senate, headed by the Senate president, followed by the vice-president, parliamentarian, communications officer, and treasurer. Two senators, a master's candidate, and a PhD candidate are elected each year to represent each academic department at Teachers College to advocate on behalf of current students and alumni. The TC Senate meets bi-weekly to determine what issues need to be investigated.

=== Rankings ===
In 2023 and 2024, U.S. News & World Report ranked Teachers College, Columbia University #1 among all graduate schools of education in the United States. In 2023, 2008, 2002, 1998, 1997, and 1996 Teachers College, Columbia University was also ranked #1 in the category of graduate schools of education in the United States by U.S. News.

== Relationship with Columbia University ==
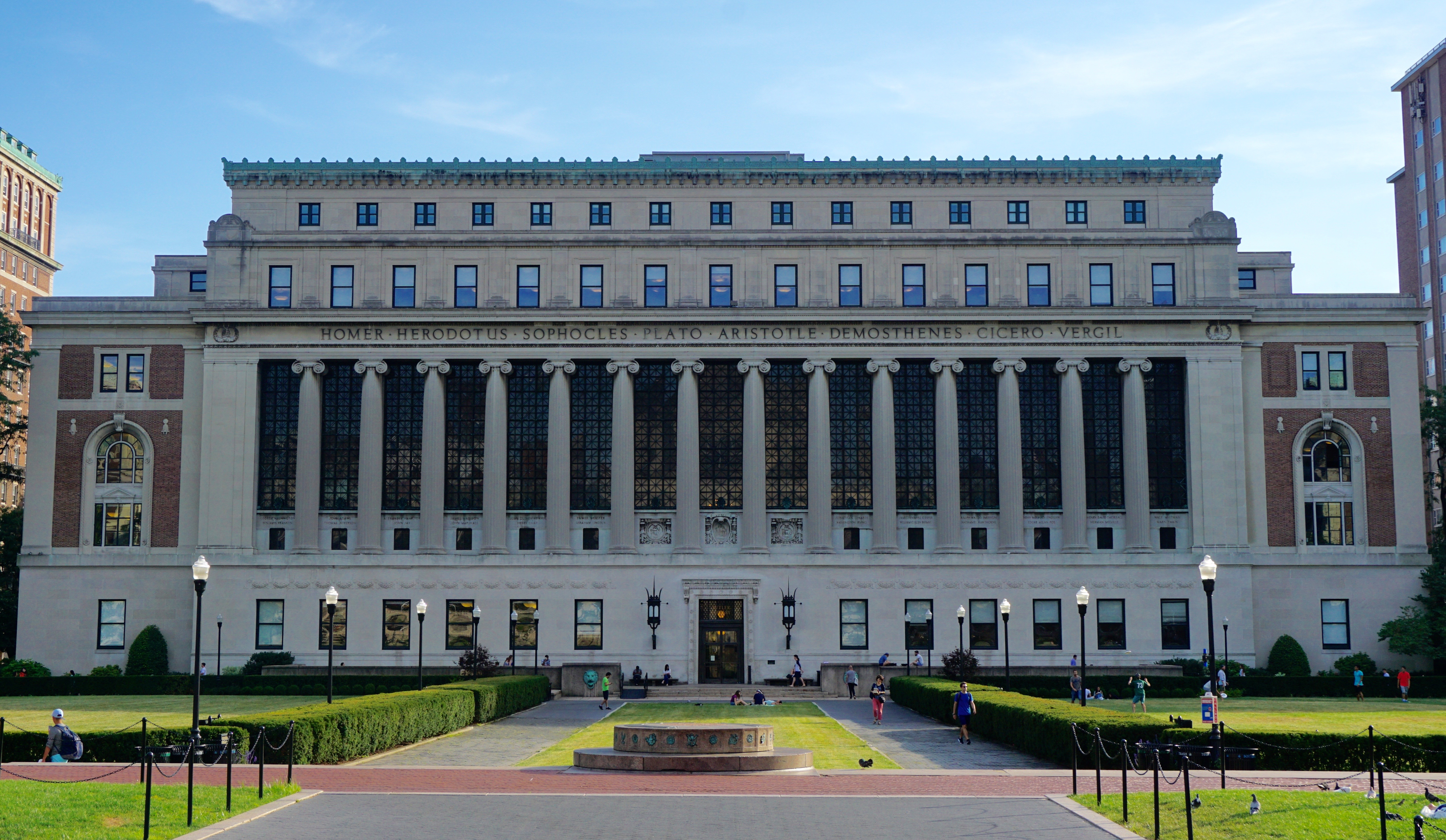
Butler Library

Teachers College serves as Columbia University's graduate school of education and psychology, and while Teachers College holds its own corporate status, an independent administrative structure, board of trustees and endowment, Teachers College graduates are awarded Columbia University degrees according to the statutes of Columbia University.

Although the college houses PhD programs, these degrees are conferred by Columbia University's Graduate School of Arts and Sciences in a manner analogous to the PhD programs of the university's other professional schools.

Teachers College's graduating class participates in the Columbia University Commencement ceremony. TC graduates are Columbia University alumni, may attend Columbia Alumni Association events, retain their @columbia.edu email for life, and are eligible for nomination of the alumni medal and membership to the Columbia University Club of New York.

While Teachers College faculty appointments are approved by Teachers College's board of trustees at the discretion of the president of Columbia University, "Columbia University [has] no responsibility for salaries, tenure, or retirement allowances" of officers of Teachers College.

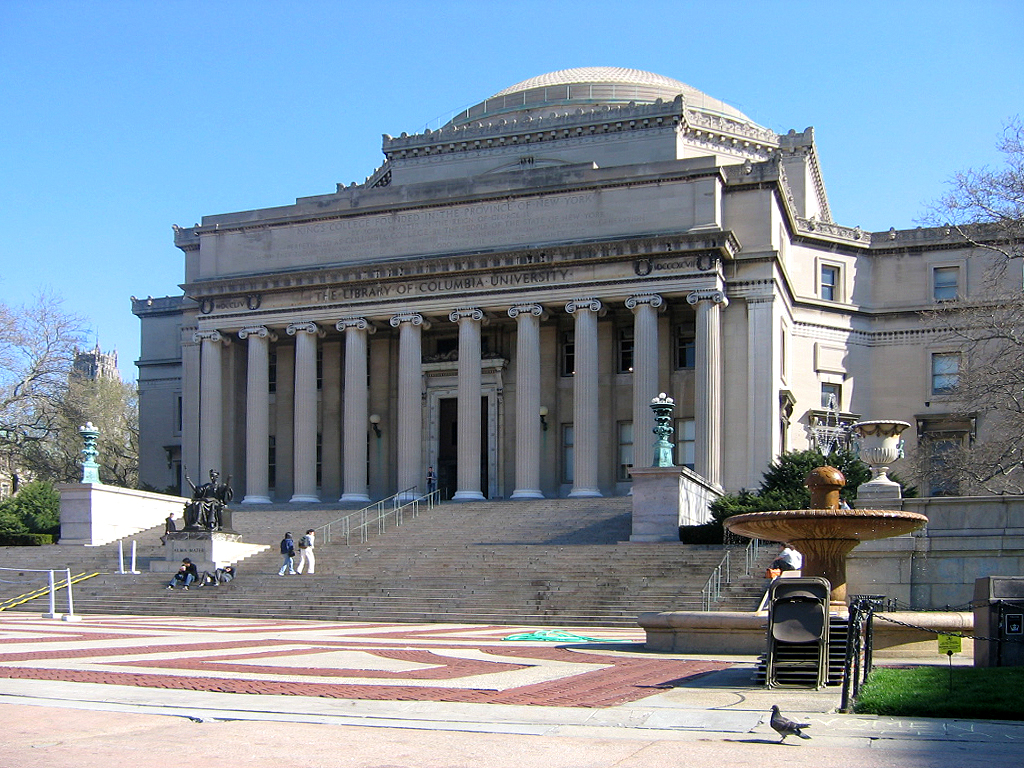
Low Memorial Library

Teachers College shares academic and institutional resources with greater Columbia University including courses of instruction (Teachers College students may take courses at any other Columbia University graduate school and vice versa.), libraries, health service systems, research centers, classrooms, special event facilities and the Dodge Fitness Center.

During COVID-19, the Ivy League allowed Columbia fourth-year senior student-athletes, who lost playing time due to pandemic-related cancellations in their final year of eligibility, to continue playing their varsity sport for the 2021–22 season if they were accepted to and enrolled at Teachers College.

The Columbia University Senate includes faculty and student representatives from Teachers College who serve two-year terms; all senators are accorded full voting privileges regarding matters impacting the entire University. The president of Teachers College is a dean in the university's governance structure.

== Housing ==
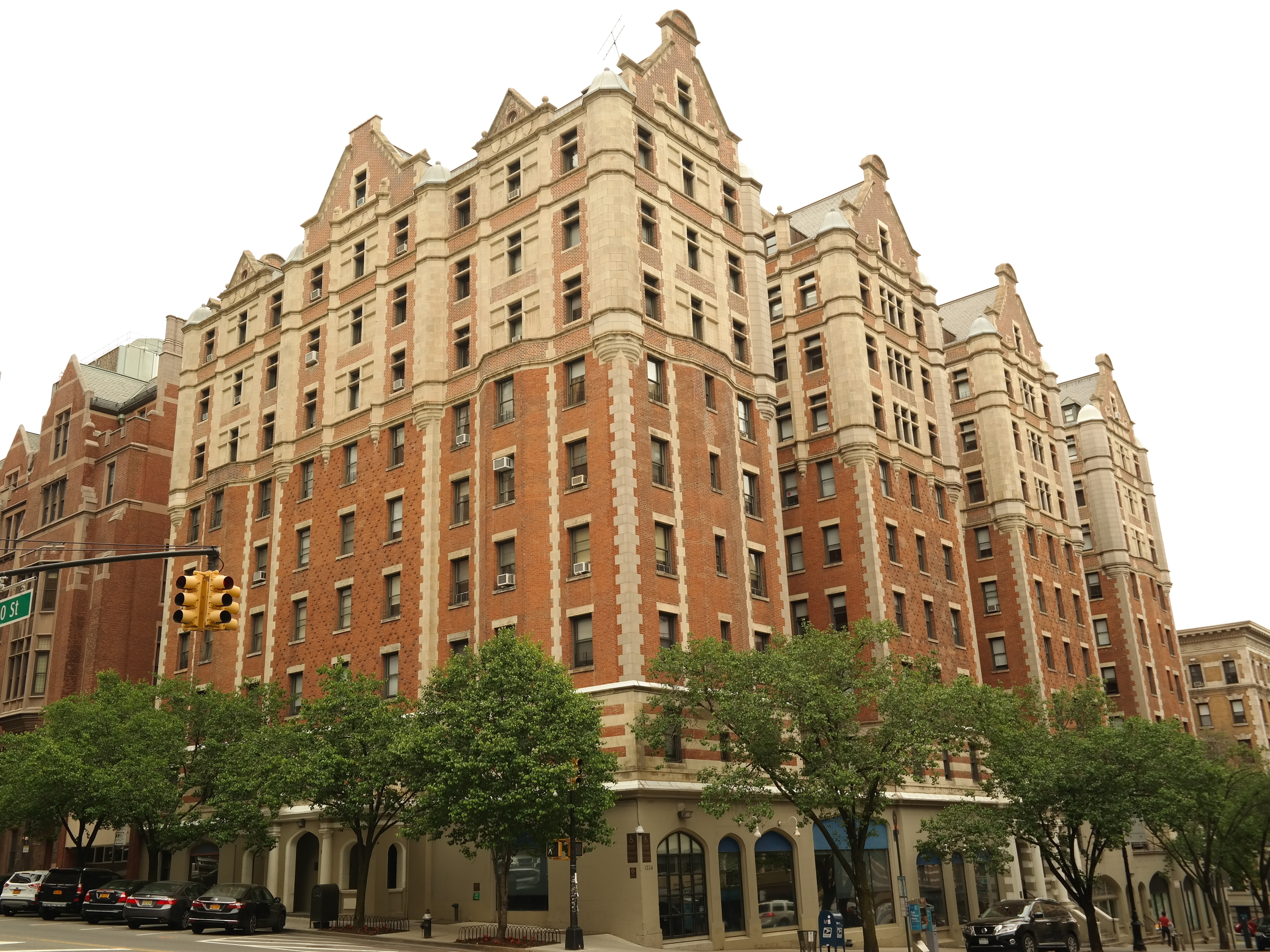
Whittier Hall

The college has three residence halls for single students. They are 517 West 121st, Grant Hall, and Whittier Hall. The college has three residence halls for family housing. They are Bancroft Hall, Grant Hall, and Sarasota Hall. One bedroom apartments are available for childless students and students who have one child. Two and three-bedroom apartments are available for students who have more than one child. Lowell Hall and Seth Low Hall have faculty housing units.

== Publications ==
The Teachers College Record has been published by the college continuously since 1900. In 1997 a group of doctoral students from Teachers College established the journal Current Issues in Comparative Education (CICE), a leading open-access online academic journal.

Teachers College Press, founded in 1904, is the national and international book publishing arm of Teachers College and is dedicated to deepening the understanding and improving the practice of education. Teachers College also publishes The Hechinger Report, a non-profit, non-partisan education news outlet focused on inequality and innovation in education that launched in May 2010.

The Journal of Mathematics Education at Teachers College (JMETC with ISSN 2156-1397, 2156-1400) is affiliated with the Teachers College Program in Mathematics Education. It is a successor to an earlier publication by the Program in Mathematics and Education at Teachers College.

== Notable faculty ==
=== Current faculty ===
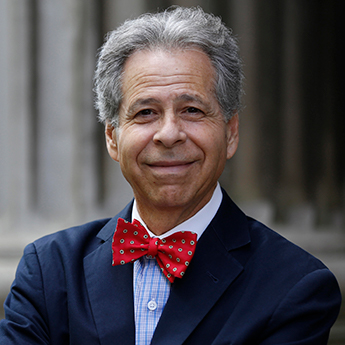
Arthur M. Langer

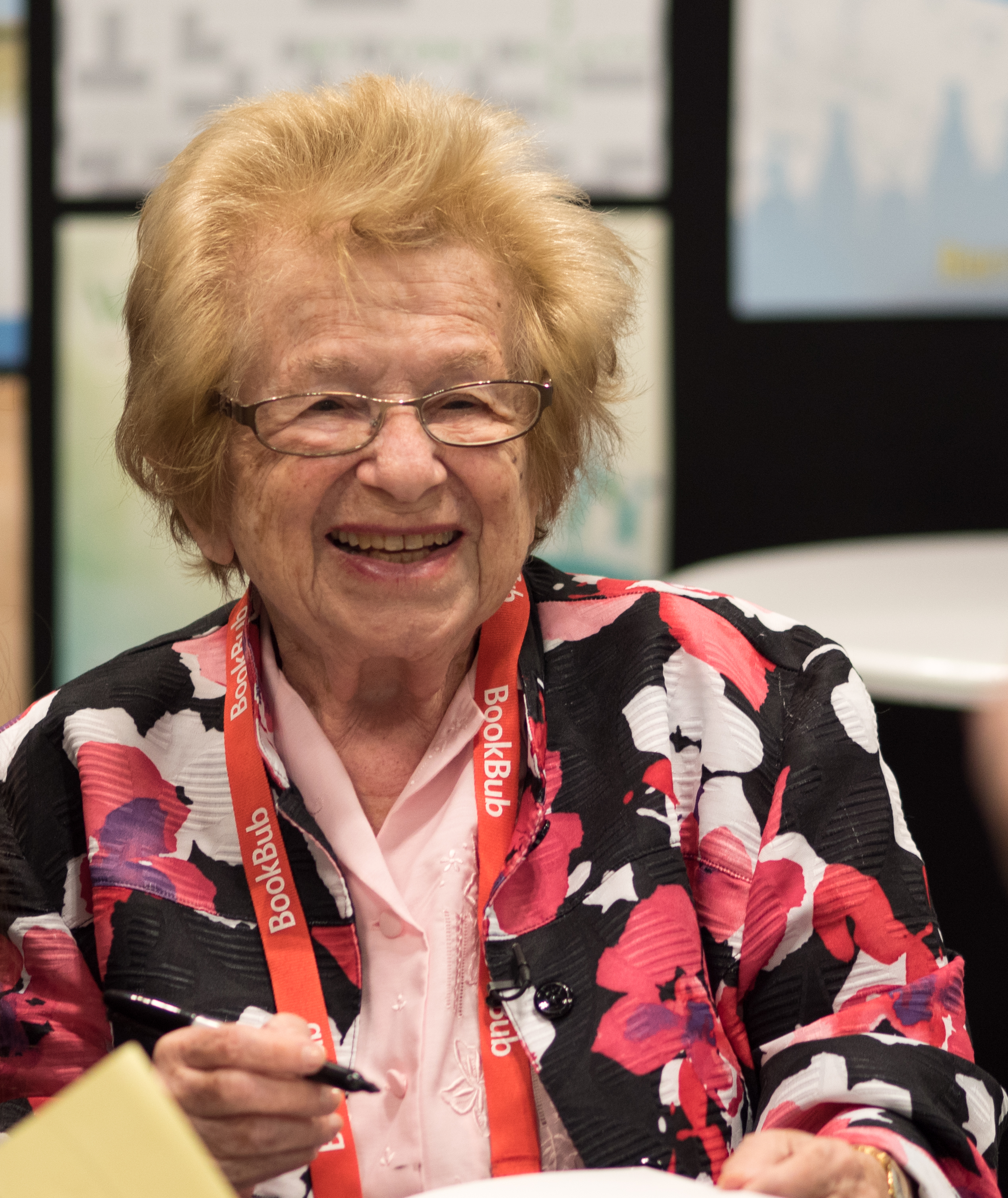
Dr. Ruth Westheimer

- John Allegrante, Health and Behavior Studies
- Charles Basch, Health Education
- George Bonanno, Clinical Psychology
- Lucy Calkins, Children's Literature
- Peter T. Coleman, Social-Organizational Psychology and Conflict Resolution
- Christopher Emdin, Science Education
- Edmund Gordon, Psychology and Education
- Neil R. Grabois, Mathematics Education
- Henry Landau, Mathematics Education
- Arthur M. Langer, Professor of Professional Practice, Department of Organization and Leadership
- Suniya Luthar, Psychology and Education
- Elizabeth Midlarsky, Psychology and Education
- Lisa Miller, Clinical Psychology
- Kimberly G. Noble, Neuroscience and Education
- Henry O. Pollak, Mathematics Education
- Michael Rebell, Law and Educational Practice
- Robert S. Siegler, Psychology and Education
- Derald Wing Sue, Counseling Psychology
- Barbara Tversky, Psychology and Education
- Erica Walker, Mathematics and Education
- Barbara C. Wallace, Clinical Psychology

=== Past faculty ===
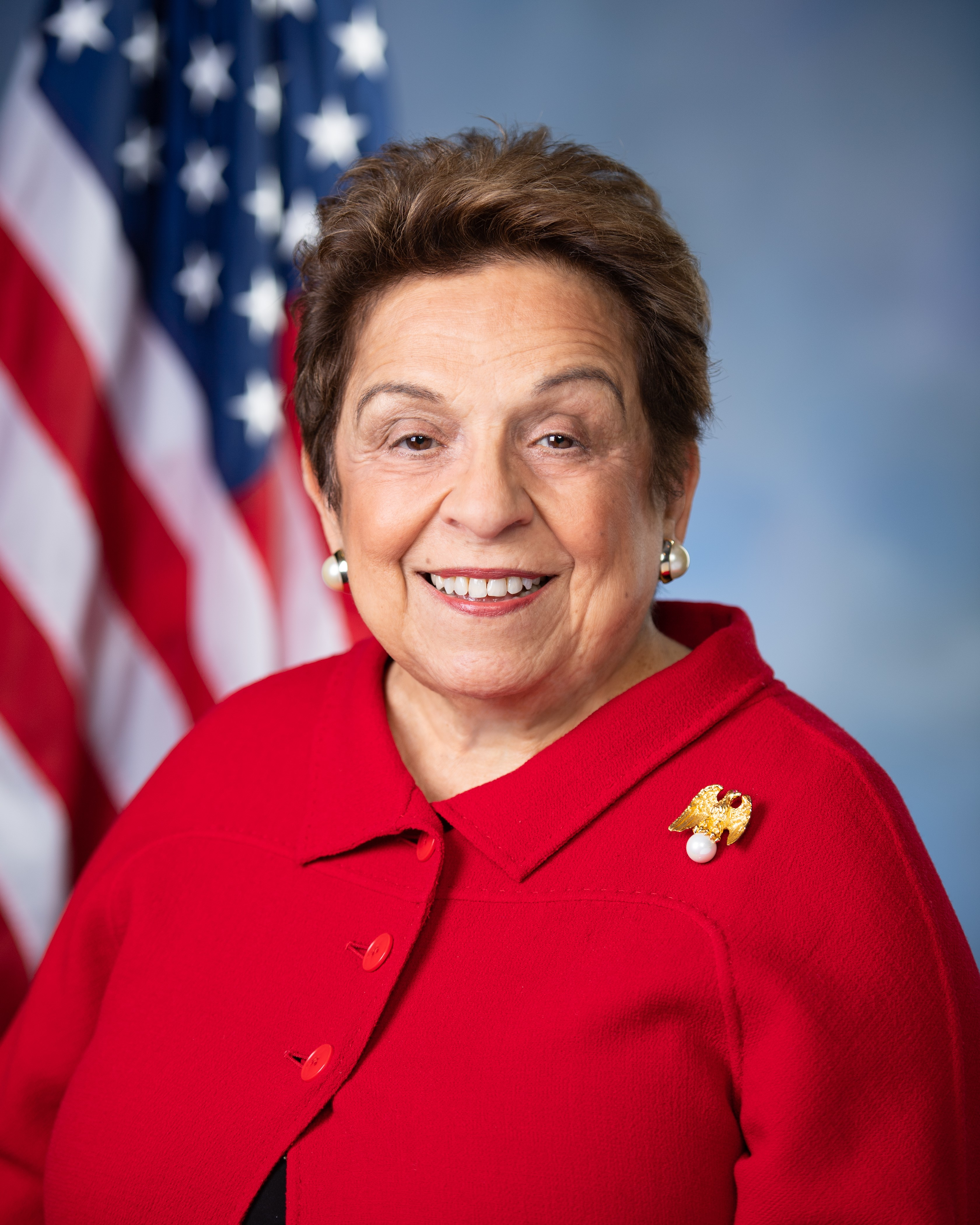
Donna Shalala

- Eva Allen Alberti (1856–1938), dramatics teacher
- Richard Thomas Alexander, founder of New College for the Education of Teachers
- Allen E. Bergin, clinical psychologist
- John Cage, composer, musician, poet, mycologist
- Lambros Comitas, Applied Anthropology
- Frank W. Cyr, father of the Yellow School Bus
- Morton Deutsch, social psychologist and founding father of the field of conflict resolution
- John Dewey, philosopher
- Arthur Wesley Dow, arts education
- David F. Duncan, health education
- Elizabeth E. Farrell, first president of the Council for Exceptional Children
- Hamden L. Forkner, founder of Future Business Leaders of America
- Elbert K. Fretwell, second Chief Scout Executive
- Maxine Greene, philosopher of education
- Joan Dye Gussow, Nutrition Education
- Linda Darling Hammond, founder of the National Center for Restructuring Education
- Virginia Henderson, arguably the most famous nurse of the 20th century
- Leta Stetter Hollingworth, psychology and education
- Adele T. Katz, Music
- William Heard Kilpatrick, philosopher of education
- Solon Kimball, anthropologist
- Julius B. Maller, educational psychology
- Charles J. Martin, arts instructor
- Margaret Mead, anthropologist
- William Hughes Mearns, educator and poet; head of the College from 1920
- Jack Mezirow, sociologist; former professor of adult and continuing education
- Harold J. Noah, comparative education
- Nel Noddings, philosopher of education
- Mary Adelaide Nutting, nursing
- Mary Swartz Rose, created nation's first program in nutrition
- Harold Rugg, educational reformer
- Julius Sachs, Education
- Donna Shalala, former US Secretary of Health and Human Services
- Douglas Sloan, professor of history of education; educational theorist; author
- David Eugene Smith, professor of mathematics & mathematics education
- Graeme Sullivan, art education
- Edward Thorndike, psychologist
- Robert L. Thorndike, psychologist
- Ruth Westheimer, Adjunct Professor, International and Transcultural Studies Department.
- Clarence Hudson White, founding member of the Photo-Secession movement
- Mary Schenck Woolman, pioneer in vocational education, one of the first two women on staff

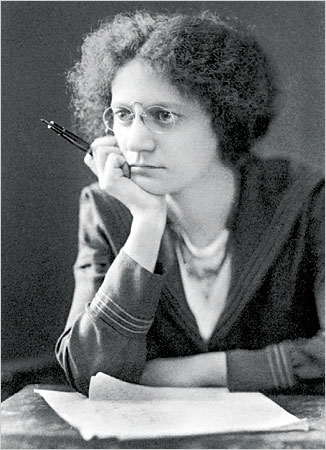
Mary Antin

== Notable alumni ==
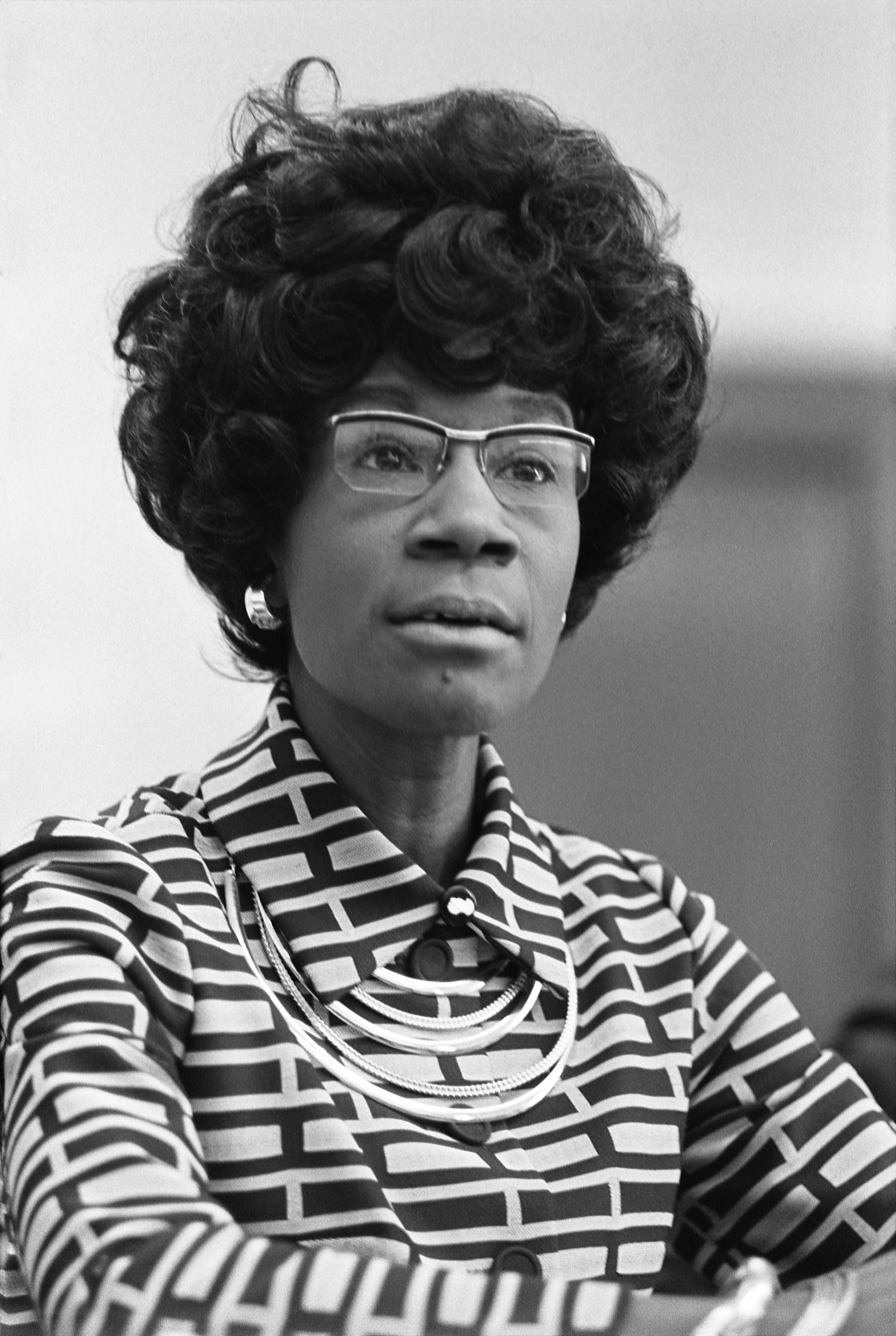
Shirley Chisholm

Following is a select list of notable alumni.

- Muhammad Fadhel al-Jamali (M.A. 1930; Ph.D. 1934), Prime Minister of Iraq
- Hafizullah Amin (M.A.), President of Afghanistan
- Nahas Gideon Angula (M.A. 1978; Ed.M. 1979), Prime Minister of Namibia
- Mary Antin (1902), immigration rights activist; author of The Promised Land
- Carolyn Sherwin Bailey (1896), author of Miss Hickory, winner of the 1947 Newbery Medal
- Myra Biggerstaff, artist
- William Vincent Campbell Jr. (Ed.M. 1974), CEO for Claris; Intuit Inc. and GO Corporation
- Betty Castor (1963), politician and president of the University of South Florida
- Shirley Chisholm (M.A. 1952), first African American woman elected to Congress and former US presidential candidate
- Katherine M. Cook (M.A. 1912), Chief, Division of Rural Education, Bureau of Education; Chief, Division of Special Problems, Office of Education, HEW
- Claire Fagin (M.A.), first woman to serve as president of an Ivy League university
- Art Garfunkel (M.A. 1967), singer, Rock and Roll Hall of Fame inductee, poet, and actor
- Gordon Gee (Ed.D. 1972), president of Ohio State University
- Hazel Johnson-Brown (M.A. 1963), first female African-American general in the United States Army
- Jiang Menglin (Ph.D.), president of Peking University; Minister of education for the Republic of China
- William Schuman (B.S. 1935; M.A. 1937), former president of the Juilliard School of Music and the Lincoln Center for the Performing Arts
- Leon Sullivan (M.A. 1947), civil rights leader and social activist; 1991 Presidential Medal of Freedom recipient
- Ruth Westheimer (Ed.D. 1970), sex therapist known as "Dr. Ruth" talk show host, author, and professor

== See also ==
- History of education in New York City
- Institute for Nonprofit News
- Japan Campus of Foreign Universities
