= Fine motor skill =

Coordination of small muscles, particularly of the hands and fingers, with the eyes

Fine motor skill or dexterity is the coordination of small muscles in movement with the eyes, hands and fingers. The complex levels of manual dexterity that humans exhibit can be related to the nervous system. Fine motor skills aid in the growth of intelligence and develop continuously throughout the stages of human development.

== Types of motor skills ==
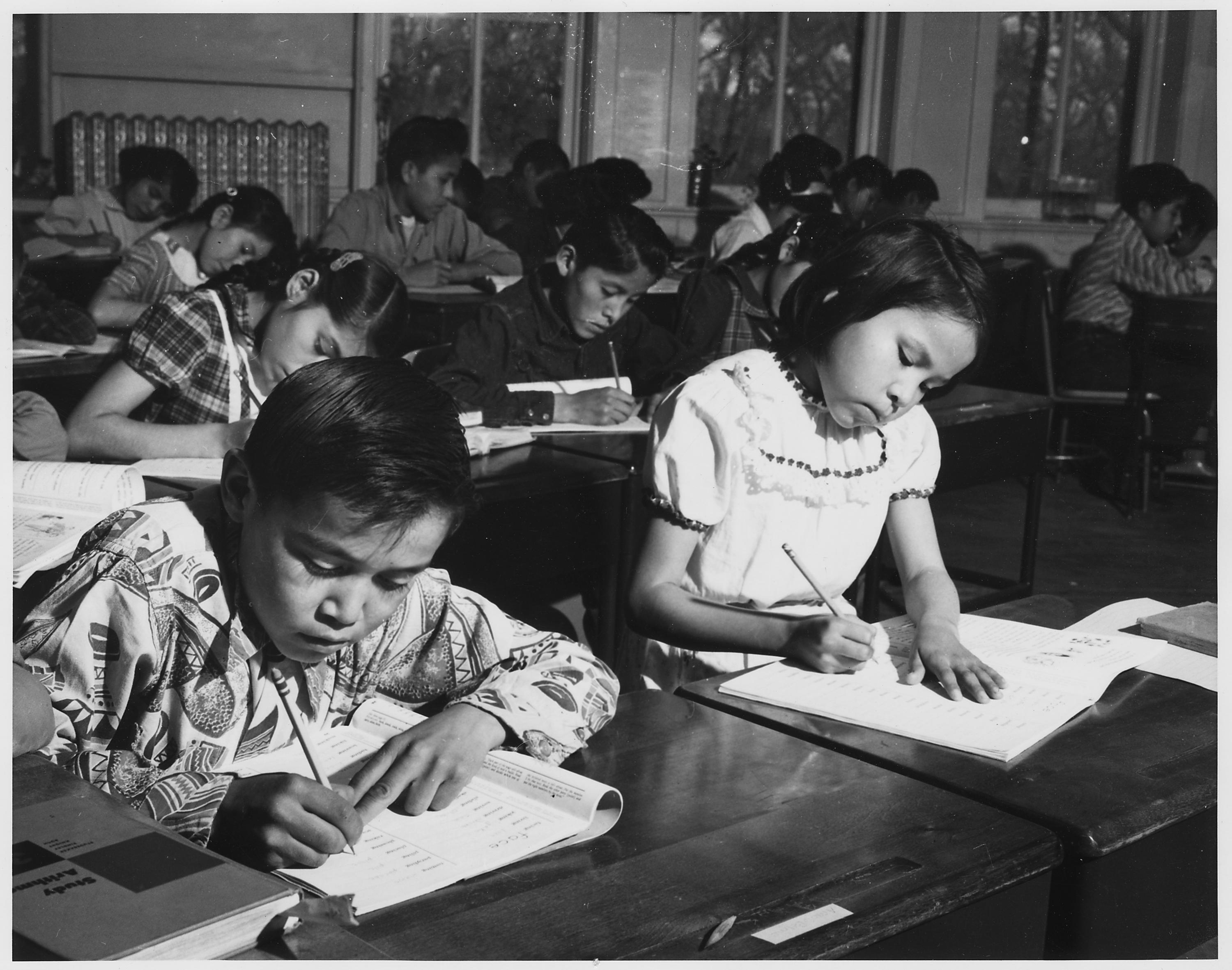
Writing is a fine motor skill as it requires subtle motions of the hand and fingers.

Motor skills are movements and actions of the bone structures. Typically, they are categorised into two groups: gross motor skills and fine motor skills. Gross motor skills are involved in movement and coordination of the arms, legs, and other large body parts. They involve actions such as running, crawling and swimming. Fine motor skills are involved in smaller movements that occur in the wrists, hands, fingers, feet and toes. Specifically, single joint movements are fine motor movements and require fine motor skills. They involve smaller actions such as picking up objects between the thumb and finger, writing carefully, and blinking.

== Developmental stages ==
Through each developmental stage, motor skills gradually develop. They are first seen during infancy, toddler-hood, preschool and school age. "Basic" fine motor skills gradually develop and are typically mastered between the ages of 6–12 in children. Fine motor skills develop with age and practice. If deemed necessary, occupational therapy can help improve overall fine motor skills.

=== Infancy ===
Early fine motor skills are involuntary reflexes. The most notable involuntary reflex is the Darwinian reflex, a primitive reflex displayed in various newborn primates species. These involuntary muscle movements are temporary and often disappear after the first two months. After eight weeks, an infant will begin to voluntarily use fingers to touch. However, infants have not learned to grab at this stage.

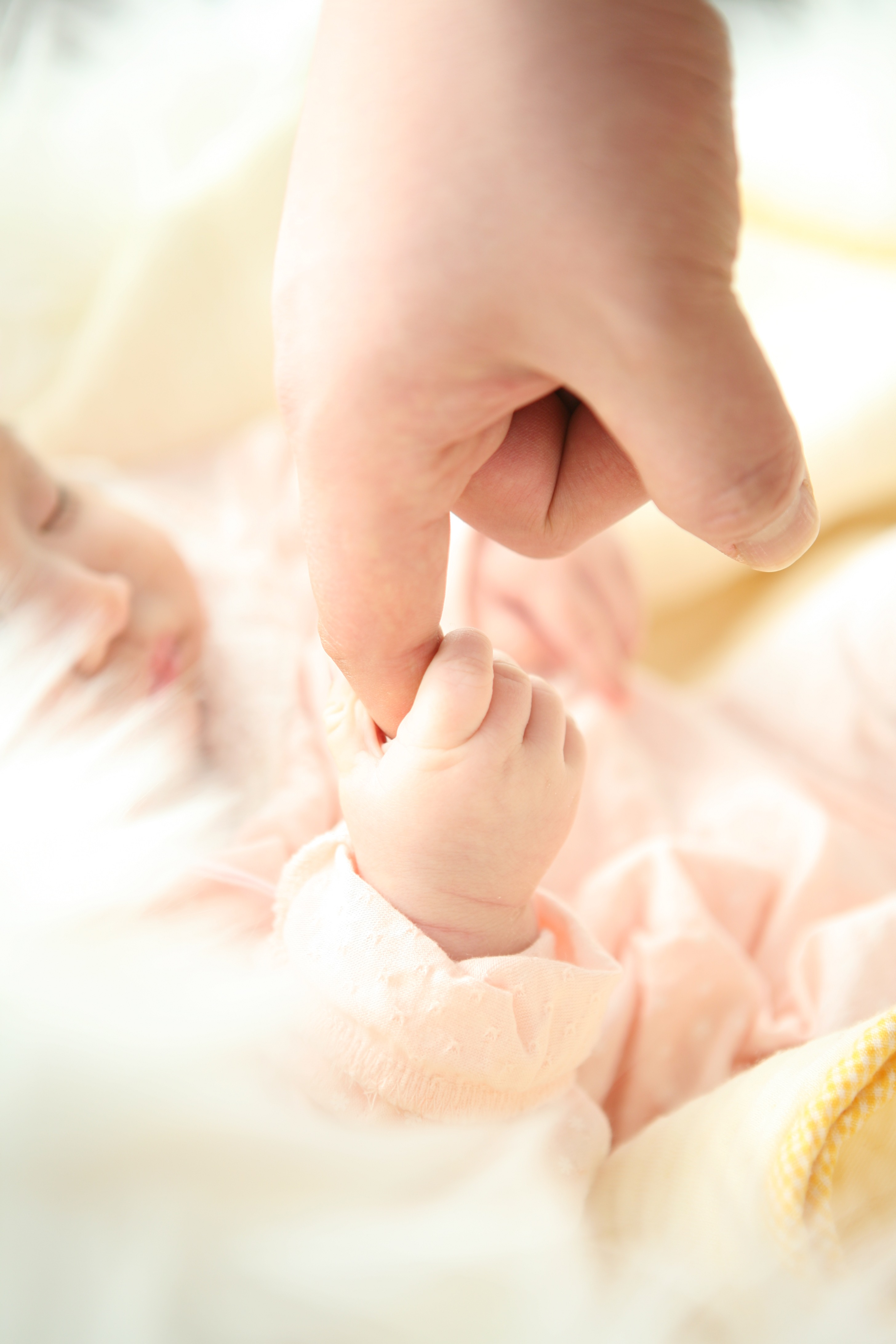
Infant displaying the palmar grasp reflex

Hand–eye coordination begins to develop at two to five months. Infants begin to reach for and grasp objects at this age. In 1952, Piaget found that even before infants are able to reach for and successfully grasp objects they see, they demonstrate competent hand-mouth coordination. A study was done by Philippe Rochat at Emory University in 1992 to test the relation between progress in the control of posture and the developmental transition from two-handed to one-handed engagement in reaching. It was found that the object reached for needed to be controlled. The precision of the reach is potentially maximized when placed centrally.

It was also found that the posture needed to be controlled because infants that were not able to sit on their own used bimanual reaches in all postural positions except sitting upright, where they would reach one-handed. As a result, their grasping phases will not have been maximized because of the decrease in body control. On the other hand, if the infant does not have body control, it would be hard for them to get a hold of an object because their reach will be limited.

When "non-sitting" infants reached bimanually, while seated upright, they often ended up falling forward. Regardless of whether they can self-sit, infants can adjust their two handed engagement in relation to the arrangement of the objects being reached for. Analysis of hand-to-hand distance during reaching indicates that in the prone and supine posture, non-sitting infants moved their hands simultaneously towards the midline of their bodies as they reached which is not observed by stable sitting infants in any position. Non-sitter infants, although showing strong tendencies toward bimanual reaching, tend to reach with one hand when sat. Sitter infants show a majority of differentiated reaches in all posture conditions.

A study conducted by Esther Thelen on postural control during infancy used the dynamic systems approach to observe motor development. The findings suggest that early reaching is constrained by head and shoulder instability. The relationship between posture and reaching is tight. Thus, head control and body stability are necessary for the emergence of grasping.

The next developmental milestone is between seven and twelve months, when a series of fine motor skills begins to develop. These include increase in grip, enhancement of vision, pointing with the index finger, smoothly transferring objects from one hand to the other, as well as using the pincer grip (with the thumb and index fingers) to pick up tiny objects with precision. A lot of factors change in grasping when the infant becomes seven months. The infant will have a better chance of grasping because they can sit up. Therefore, the infant will not fall over. The infant grasping also changes. The infant starts to hold objects more properly when age increases.

=== Toddlerhood ===
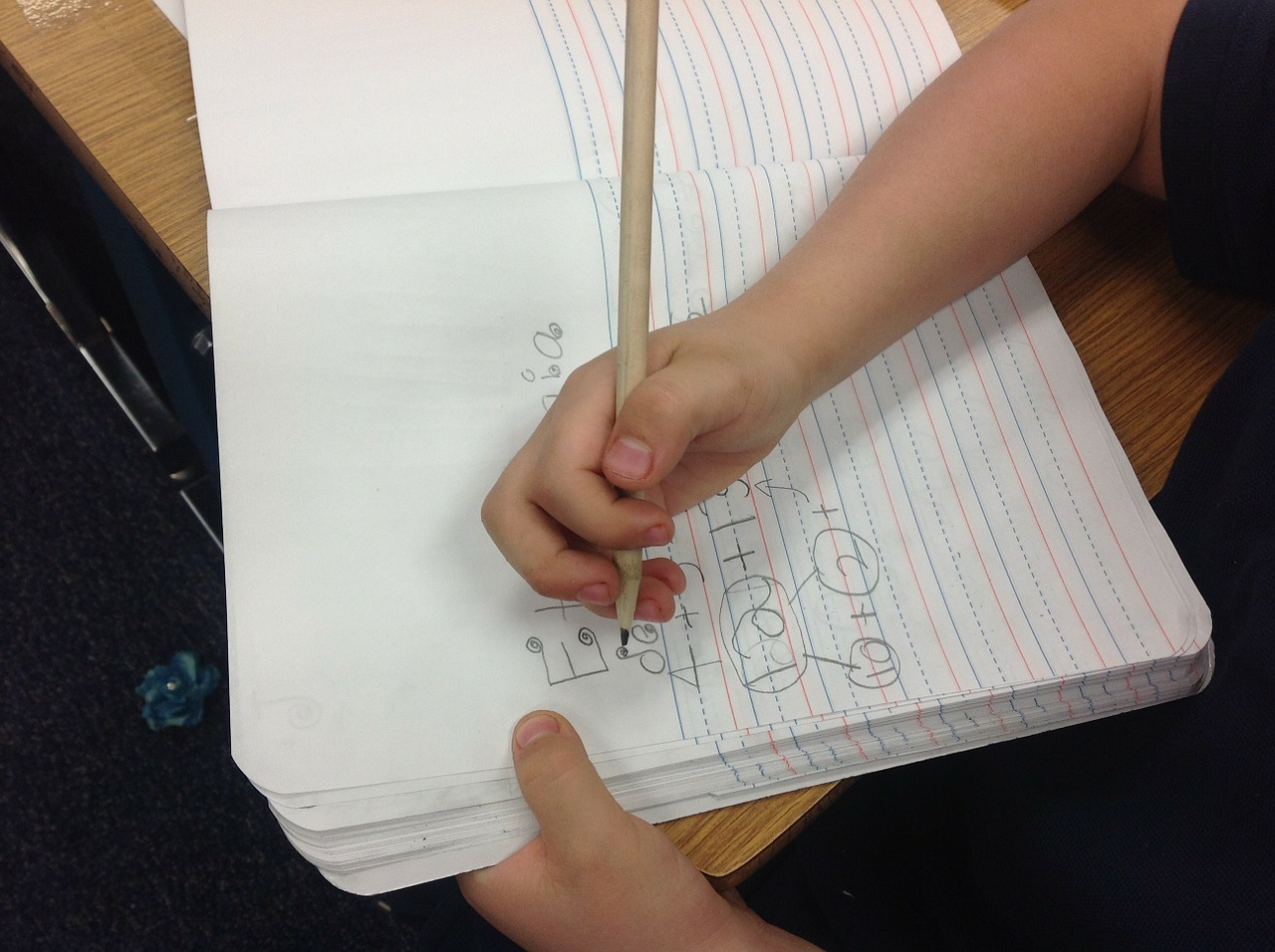
Writing abilities are a major fine motor skill.

By the time a child is one year old, their fine motor skills have developed to hold and look at objects. As children manipulate objects with purpose, they gain experience identifying objects based on their shape, size, and weight. This develops the child's fine motor skills, and their understanding of the world. A toddler will show hand dominance.

=== Preschool ===
Children typically attend preschool between the ages of 2 and 5. At this time, the child is capable of grasping objects using the static tripod grasp, which is the combined use of the index, thumb, and middle finger. A preschool child's motor skills are moderate, allowing the child to cut shapes out of paper, draw or trace over vertical lines with crayons, button their clothes, and pick up objects. A preferred hand dominates the majority of their activities. They also develop sensory awareness and interpret their environment by using their senses and moving accordingly.

After the static tripod grasp, the next form is the dynamic tripod grasp. These are shown in a series through Schneck and Henderson's Grip Form chart. Based on the accuracy and form of hold the child will be ranked either from 1–10 or 1–5 of how well they are able to complete the dynamic tripod grasp while properly writing. In conjunction with accuracy and precision the child will be able to properly position a writing utensil in terms of implement diameter as well as form and grip strength. Proper handwriting and drawing fall deeper into a category of graphomotor skills.

The National Centre of Teaching and Learning illustrates the abilities that preschool children should have improved through their fine motor skills in several domains. Children use their motor skills by sorting and manipulating geometric shapes, making patterns, and using measurement tools to build their math skills. By using writing tools and reading books, they build their language and literacy. Arts and crafts activities like cutting and gluing paper, finger painting, and dressing up develops their creativity. Parents can support this development by intervening when the child does not perform the fine motor activity correctly, making use of several senses in a learning activity, and offer activities that the child will be successful with.

Developmental disabilities such as autism or cerebral palsy may stop a child doing things that involve motor skills such as drawing or building blocks. Fine motor skills acquired during this stage aids in the later advancement and understanding of subjects such as science and reading. A study by the American Journal of Occupational Therapy, which included twenty-six preschool children who had received occupational therapy on a weekly basis, showed overall advancements in their fine motor skill area. The results showed a link between in-hand manipulation, hand–eye coordination, and grasping strength with the child's motor skills, self-care and social function. These children were shown to have better mobility and self-sustainment.

=== School age ===
During the ages between five and seven, the fine motor skills will have developed. As the child interacts with objects the movements of the elbows and shoulders should be less apparent, as should the movements of wrist and fingers. From the ages of three to five years old, girls advance their fine motor skills more than boys. Girls develop physically at an earlier age than boys; this is what allows them to advance their motor skills at a faster rate during prepubescent ages. Boys advance in gross motor skills later on at around age five and up. Children should be able to make precise cuts with scissors, for example, cutting out squares and holding them in a more common and mature manner. The child's movements should become fluid as the arms and hands become more in sync with each other. The child should also be able to write more precisely on lines, and print letters and numbers with greater clarity.

== Common problems ==
Fine motor skills can become impaired due to injury, illness, stroke, congenital deformities, cerebral palsy, or developmental disabilities. Problems with the brain, spinal cord, peripheral nerves, muscles, or joints can also have an effect on fine motor skills, and can decrease control. If an infant or child up to age five is not developing their fine motor skills, they will show signs of difficulty controlling their hands, fingers, and face. In young children, delays in learning sitting or walking is an early sign that there will be issues with fine motor skills, and may also show signs of difficulty with tasks such as cutting with scissors, drawing lines, or folding clothes. If a child has difficulty with these, they might have poor hand–eye coordination and could need therapy to improve their skills.

== Assessment ==
Fine motor skills can be assessed with standardized and non-standardized tests in children and adults. Fine-motor assessments can include force matching tasks. Humans exhibit a high degree of accuracy in force matching tasks where an individual is instructed to match a reference force applied to a finger with the same or different finger. Humans show high accuracy during grip force matching tasks. These aspects of manual dexterity are apparent in the ability of humans to effectively use tools, and perform hard manipulation tasks such as handling unstable objects. Another assessment is called The Peabody Developmental Scales (PDMS). PDMS is a test for children 0–7 that examines the child's ability to grasp a variety of objects, the development of hand–eye coordination, and the child's overall finger dexterity.

Similar to PDMS, visual–motor integration assessment, VMI-R, is an assessment that examines the visual motor integration system which demonstrates and points out possible learning disabilities that are often related to delays in visual perception and fine-motor skills such as poor hand–eye coordination. Because additionally advancements in mathematics and language skills are directly correlated to the development of the fine motor system, it is essential that children acquire the fine motor skills that are needed to interact with the environment at an early stage. Examples of tests include:

- Purdue Pegboard Test
- Box and Blocks Test
- Strength-dexterity test

== See also ==
- Hand–eye coordination
- Spatial awareness
- Depth perception
- Sleight of hand
