= Chicago Council on Global Affairs =

Foreign affairs think tank in Chicago, Illinois, US

The Chicago Council on Global Affairs
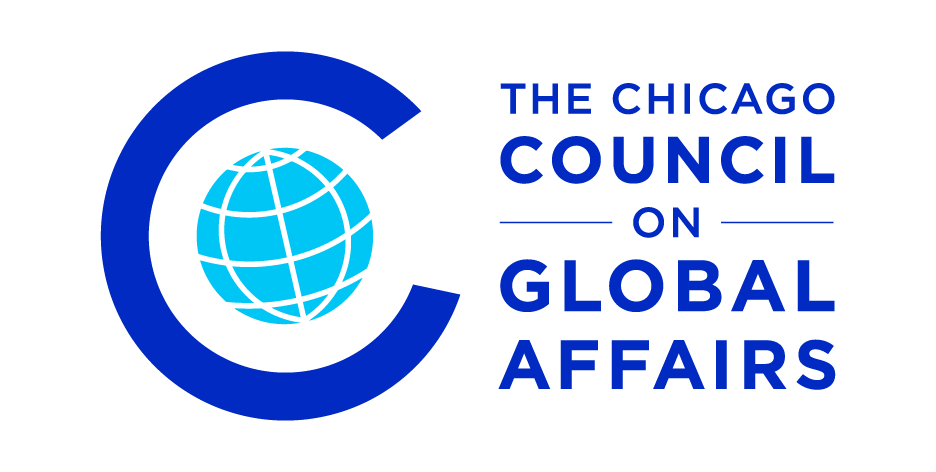
- Formation: February 20, 1922
- Type: nonpartisan global affairs think tank
- Headquarters: Prudential Plaza, 130 E. Randolph St. Suite 1650, Chicago, Illinois, US 60601
- Methods: Nonpartisan policy research and analysis on American public opinion on US foreign policy, global agricultural development and food security, US diplomacy, security and defense, and the global economy; briefing policymakers and influencers to shape policy discussions and debates; leadership training and development for mid-career professionals with global leadership potential; public events and education, and the development and distribution of digital content
- President & CEO: Leslie Vinjamuri
- Revenue: $10,472,539 (2024)
- Expenses: $12,079,498 (2024)
- Website: globalaffairs.org

The Chicago Council on Global Affairs is an American think tank and public engagement nonprofit organization focused on global affairs located in Chicago, Illinois. Founded in 1922 as the Chicago Council on Foreign Relations, it is an independent, nonpartisan nonprofit 501(c)(3) organization with a stated mission of "increasing knowledge of and engagement in global affairs through events and engagement experiences, leadership development programs, public opinion surveys, and research and analysis."

The council has hosted numerous presidents, prime ministers, and secretaries of state since its founding

The council is home to the Lester Crown Center on US Foreign Policy. Since 1974, the council has polled the American public to understand their views on US global engagement. The Chicago Council Survey focuses on American public opinions of foreign policy issues, highlighting trends and shifts in thinking over time.

Dr. Leslie Vinjamuri was named president and CEO of the council in 2025.

== History ==
=== 1922: The council’s founding ===
The Chicago Council on Foreign Relations was formed during the period of fervent Isolationism in the United States after World War I. On February 20, 1922, 23 men and women, led by Susan B. Hibbard and William Brown Hale, established the council as an impartial forum for discussing foreign affairs. The council’s founders believed that World War I had catapulted the United States onto the international stage, requiring reevaluation of traditional policies and greater public awareness of foreign policy issues.

=== 1920s-1930s: Establishing a foundation of excellence ===
The council remained the leading (and virtually, the only) voice on foreign affairs in the Midwest throughout the 1920s and 1930s. At a time when the mass media paid little attention to world events, the council was the region's most reliable source of international news and analysis. In 1930, the council began broadcasting discussions of foreign affairs and luncheon speeches over WGN (AM) radio.

In 1933, a young Adlai Stevenson II joined the council executive committee of the board and, in 1933, was elected president (chair equivalent). He left Chicago almost immediately, however, to work for the New Deal in Washington. In 1935, back in Chicago, he was elected president again and served a full two-year term.

Regular meetings and public lectures featuring distinguished international personalities and experts often drew thousands of guests. Speakers during this time included British Economist John Maynard Keynes, US president Herbert Hooverr, French Wartime Premier Georges Clemenceau, and former German Chancellor Heinrich Brüning.

=== 1940s-1950s: Increasing relevance and growth ===
After World War II, the council pivoted to attract younger members by forming the Young Adults Group. In addition, the council introduced suburban programs to reach beyond Chicago. The council launched World Spotlight in 1955, a weekly television series airing on WTTW. The series aired for about five years and featured Council Director (president equivalent) Carter Davidson and guests, who discussed world events. The council continued to grow its core activity of private meetings and public events. Speakers during this time included First Lady Eleanor Roosevelt, India prime minister Jawaharlal Nehru, future Secretary of State John Foster Dulles, and US Senator John F. Kennedy.

=== 1960s-1970s: Broadening horizons ===
In the early 1960s, the council's programming shifted its emphasis to the leading international issues of the day like world hunger and relations between the countries across the Atlantic. The council also began sponsoring missions to foreign countries, drawing engagement and participation from local business and civic leaders. Entering the 1970s, under the leadership of Executive Director and then president John E. Rielly, the council launched its biennial Atlantic Conference, which brought together foreign policy experts from North America, Europe, Latin America, and Africa for discussions of important themes. 1974 marked the first year the organization conducted and published results from the Chicago Council Survey, a significant undertaking to understand US public opinion on foreign policy that continues to this day.

During this time, the council hosted events with speakers such as Italian prime minister Aldo Moro, philosopher Mortimer J. Adler, Israeli Foreign Minister Abba Eban, UN Secretaries-General U Thant and Kurt Waldheim, US president Gerald Ford, economist Milton Friedman, and US Secretary of State Henry Kissinger.

=== 1980s-1990s: Expanding audiences and reach ===
During the post-Cold War period, the council expanded its specialized programming for business leaders, young professionals, secondary school teachers, international travelers, and the public. Programming concentrated on European development, economics, and integration, which included facilitation of exchanges between young leaders in the Midwest and Europe. At the same time, Human rights became a central topic as civil strife increased in countries around the globe.

Speakers during this time included German chancellor Helmut Kohl, Canadian prime minister Brian Mulroney, Israeli prime minister Yitzhak Shamir, Polish Solidarity leader and future president Lech Wałęsa, former prime minister of France Valéry Giscard d'Estaing, Egyptian president Hosni Mubarak, former British prime minister Margaret Thatcher, former Soviet president Mikhail Gorbachev, and South Korea president Kim Young-sam.

=== Early 2000s: Shifting toward globalism ===
In the early 2000s, the council increased activities for public education, drawing US and international leaders and world affairs experts to Chicago. Speakers included Pakistan president Pervez Musharraf, Chinese president Jiang Zemin, Canadian prime minister Jean Chrétien, Irish president Mary McAleese, Ukraine president Viktor Yushchenko, U.S. Secretary of State Condoleezza Rice, President of the Republic of Liberia Ellen Johnson Sirleaf, Australian prime minister John Howard, future US president Barack Obama, and former UK prime minister Tony Blair.

In addition, the organization heightened its focus on trends and themes—including the global economy, democratization, sovereignty and intervention, global institutions, and a changing America—and shifted emphasis to less familiar areas of the world, especially Asia, Africa, and Latin America. Additionally, under the leadership of President Marshall M. Bouton, who succeeded Rielly, the council moved beyond its historic concentration on public education in Chicago and expanded its influence on opinion and policy regarding global issues through activities such as task forces, conferences, and study groups. In recognition of these changes, in September 2006 the council changed its name from the Chicago Council on Foreign Relations to the Chicago Council on Global Affairs and developed a visual brand identity to represent the organization's unique character and services.

=== 2010s: A decade of change ===
At the start of the new decade, the council’s hired its first fellows and shifted its public programming toward transnational and global issues while emphasizing the council’s ties to the Midwest. The council's 2009 report on Global Food and Agriculture was given to President Obama’s transition team and was later implemented as the Feed the Future Initiative under the United States Agency for International Development. The Center on Global Food and Agriculture continued to produce annual reports and Global Food Security Symposia throughout the decade. The council was the city’s partner in organizing the 2012 Chicago NATO summit, where the US permanent representative to NATO addressed Council members. A year later, the very same US ambassador to NATO and widely recognized national security expert Ivo H. Daalder was named president of the council, succeeding Bouton.

At the midpoint of the decade, the council deepened its focus on global cities with the inaugural Chicago Forum on Global Cities in 2015, which continued as the Pritzker Forum on Global Cities through 2024. In 2016, the council moved into a large, modern office space and a state-of-the-art conference center and studio in Chicago’s One Two Pru buildings. In 2018, the council established the Lester Crown Center on US Foreign Policy with a gift from the Crown family in honor of long-time chairman Lester Crown and to support the council’s renowned public opinion research and expand its analysis on foreign policy issues.

During this time, the council also expanded its digital capabilities and with that, its stature on the global stage. Speakers included US president Barack Obama, US Secretaries of State Hillary Clinton and John Kerry; Federal Reserve System chairman Ben Bernanke; former US Secretaries of Defense Donald Rumsfeld, Chuck Hagel, and General Jim Mattis; New Zealand prime minister Helen Clark; Australian prime minister Scott Morrison; Singapore prime minister Lee Hsien Loong; Ghanaian president Nana Akufo-Addo; NATO Secretary General Anders Fogh Rasmussen; National Security Advisor Susan Rice; President of the Czech Republic Václav Klaus; and Turkish president Abdullah Gül.

=== 2020–2025: COVID-19 pandemic ===
The COVID-19 pandemic brought unprecedented disruption to Chicago, the nation, and the world. In response, the council transitioned to virtual programming, expanding access to digital events, and reinforcing its commitment to convening a global community via digital content during a period of profound uncertainty. As in-person gatherings gradually resumed, the council marked a major milestone. On March 10, 2022, it celebrated its centennial anniversary with an in-person gala honoring former US president Barack Obama and renowned cellist Yo-Yo Ma for their extraordinary contributions to advancing a more open and promising world.

=== 2025–present ===
In 2025, Dr. Leslie Vinjamuri was named president and CEO of the council, succeeding Daalder. Vinjamuri joined the council from the Royal Institute of International Affairs (Chatham House) in London, where she served as director of the US and the Americas Programme, dean of the Queen Elizabeth II Academy for Leadership in International Affairs, and professor of international relations at SOAS University of London. Under her leadership, the council has strengthened and expanded its role as a leading voice in international affairs, bringing a strong focus on the future international order at a time of deep geopolitical disruption, sharpening the council’s focus on global perceptions of US power and strategy at a time of great disruption for US partners and allies, extending the council’s national and international partnerships. The council formed a partnership with the Council on Foreign Relations and Princeton University’s Reimagining World Order to look at the Strategic Futures, building on the previous work of the US National Intelligence Council. During this period, the council also revived the Roundtable on the Global Economy, an initiative on Global Food Security, and a series of new Roundtables on China and the World, and one on Energy and Geopolitics.

That same year, the council marked the 50th anniversary of the Chicago Council Survey, its flagship public opinion research tracking American views on US foreign policy. And in advance of the United States' 250^{th} anniversary in 2026, the council initiated America at 250: The Arc of Global Influence, a series examining the nation’s understanding of itself and its global role through public and private programs, expert dialogue, and a signature global forum.

== Leadership ==
In 1974, the council adopted a board chair and president governing structure. Prior to that, presidents were equivalent to the board chair, and the executive secretaries and then executive directors were equivalent to the president. The council added the role/title of CEO in 2023.

=== Board chair (known as president 1922–1974) ===
1922-23—Jacob M. Dickinson

1923-24—Victor Elting

1924-25—William B. Hale

1925-27—William C. Boyden

1927-29—Clay Judson

1929-31—George A. Richardson

1931-33—Graham Aldis

1933-35—Walter Lichtenstei

1935-37—Adlai Stevenson II

1937-39—Laird Bell

1939-41—Donald F. McPherson

1941-42—Richard Bentley

1942-44—Frederick Woodward

1944-46—Walter T. Fisher

1946-47—Paul V. Harper

1947-50—Meyer Kestnbaum

1950-53—Daggett Harvey

1953-56—Melvin Brorby

1956-58—Charles A. Bane

1958-60—Richard H. Templeton

1960-62—Robert Wilcox

1962-64—Edward D. McDougal, Jr.

1965-66—Robert E. Wieczorowski

1966-68—Herbert V. Prochnow

1968-71—Alex R. Seith

1971-73—Richard A. Hoefs

1973-74—Hermon Dunlap Smith

1974-76—Augustin S. Hart, Jr.

1976-79—John D. Gray

1979-82—Richard L. Thomas

1982-85—Edmund A. Stephan

1985-88—John M. Richman

1988-91—Cyrus F. Freidheim, Jr.

1991-2004—William L. Weiss

2004-14—Lester Crown

2014-18—Glen Tilton

2018-21—Leah Joy and Sam Scott

2021-Present—John Ettelson

=== President (known as executive secretary 1922–1931; executive director 1942–1974) ===
1922-25—Polly Root Collier

1926-29—Isabella M. Stephans

1929-31—Alice Benning

1931-42—Clifton M. Utley

1943-52—Louise Leonard Wright

1952-53—Porter McKeever

1953-60—Carter Davidson

1960-69—Edmund I. Eger

1969-71—William Graham Cole

1971-2001—John E. Rielly

2001-13—Marshall M. Bouton

2013-23—Ivo H. Daalder

2023-24—Sarah Gilbert

2025-Present—Leslie Vinjamuri

=== CEOs ===
2023-2025—Ivo H. Daalder

2025-Present—Leslie Vinjamuri

== Global Leadership Awards ==
Each year since 2003, the Chicago Council on Global Affairs has honored distinguished individuals for their outstanding achievements in the realms of international relations, global thought leadership, and philanthropy.

=== 2025 Global Leadership Award honorees ===
- The Right Honourable Justin Trudeau, former prime minister of Canada
- Tanya and Michael Polsky, president, Polsky Foundation; founder & CEO, Invenergy
- Regina Cross, vice president in private wealth management, Goldman Sachs

=== 2024 Global Leadership Award honorees ===
- Rahm Emanuel, US Ambassador to Japan
- Brett J. Hart, president, United Airlines
- Shoba Pillay, partner, Jenner & Block

=== 2023 Global Leadership Award honorees ===
- Ursula von der Leyen, European Commission president
- Jennifer Scanlon, UL Solutions president and CEO

=== 2022 Centennial Celebration honorees ===
- Barack Obama, 44th president of the United States
- Yo-Yo Ma, cellist

=== 2021 Global Leadership Award honorees ===
- The Honorable Madeleine Albright former US secretary of state; chair, Albright Stonebridge Group
- The Honorable Condoleezza Rice, former US secretary of state; director, Hoover Institution, Stanford University

=== 2020 Global Leadership Award honorees ===
- Paul Farmer, MD, PhD, cofounder and chief strategist, Partners In Health; Professor, Harvard University
- Helene D. Gayle, MD, MPH, president and CEO, Chicago Community Trust
- Keith E. Williams, former president and CEO, UL LLC

=== 2019 Global Leadership Award honorees ===
- Frederick H. Waddell, retired chairman and CEO, Northern Trust
- Susan Schwab, strategic advisor, Mayer Brown, LLP
- David Miliband, president and CEO, International Rescue Committee

=== 2018 Global Leadership Award honorees ===
- Timothy Shriver, Ph.D., chairman, Special Olympics International
- Carole Segal, Cofounder, Crate & Barrel; president, The Segal Family Foundation

=== 2017 Global Leadership Award honorees ===
- The Honorable Penny Pritzker, founder and chairman, PSP Capital Partners and Pritzker Realty Group
- The Honorable Michael H. Moskow, vice chair and Distinguished Fellow, Global Economy, Chicago Council on Global Affairs

=== 2016 Global Leadership Award honorees ===
- Samuel C. Scott III, retired chairman, president and CEO, Corn Products International, Inc.
- Sharmeen Obaid-Chinoy, Academy Award-winning Pakistani documentary filmmaker

=== 2015 Global Leadership Award honoree ===
- Lester Crown, chairman, Henry Crown and Company, Chicago Council on Global Affairs

=== 2014 Global Leadership Award honorees ===
- Greg Q. Brown, chairman and CEO, Motorola Solutions, Inc.
- His Excellency Anders Fogh Rasmussen, Secretary General of NATO

=== 2013 Global Leadership Award honorees ===
- John Canning Jr., chairman, Madison Dearborn Partners
- The Honorable Thomas R. Pickering, former ambassador and US under secretary of state
- Leymah Gbowee, 2011 Nobel Peace laureate; president, Gbowee Peace Foundation Africa

=== 2012 Global Leadership Award honorees ===
- Glenn F. Tilton, chairman of the Midwest Region, JPMorgan Chase & Co.
- Lee Hamilton, director, The Center on Congress at Indiana University
- The Right Honourable Helen Clark, administrator, United Nations Development Programme

=== 2011 Global Leadership Award honorees ===
- James A. Skinner, vice chairman and CEO, McDonald's Corporation
- The Honorable Madeleine Albright, former US secretary of state
- Dr. Ngozi Okonjo-Iweala, managing director, World Bank

=== 2010 Global Leadership Award honorees ===
- David B. Speer, chairman and CEO, Illinois Tool Works Inc.
- Peter G. Peterson, founder and chairman, The Peter G. Peterson Foundation
- Ernesto Zedillo, Frederick Iseman '74 director, Yale Center for the Study of Globalization

=== 2009 Global Leadership Award honorees ===
- John Rowe, chairman and chief executive officer, Exelon Corporation
- The Honorable William Cohen, former US secretary of defense; former US senator and representative for Maine
- Dr. Nafis Sadik, former executive director, United Nations Population Fund

=== 2008 Global Leadership Award honorees ===
- William A. Osborn, chairman, Northern Trust Corporation
- James Wolfensohn, former president, World Bank
- Mary Robinson, president, Realizing Rights: The Ethical Globalization Initiative

=== 2007 Global Leadership Award honorees ===
- Andrew J. McKenna, chairman, Schwarz Paper Company, McDonald's Corporation
- Lt. General Brent Scowcroft, founder and president, The Scowcroft Group
- Sadako Ogata, president, Japan International Cooperation Agency

=== 2006 Global Leadership Award honorees ===
- Mrs. Shirley Welsh Ryan, chairman, Pathways Awareness Foundation
- Patrick G. Ryan, executive chairman, Aon Corporation
- The Honorable Paul Volcker, former chairman, Board of Governors of the Federal Reserve
- President Fernando Henrique Cardoso, former president of Brazil

=== 2005 Global Leadership Award honorees ===
- Edgar D. Jannotta, chairman, William Blair & Company
- Ambassador Carla Anderson Hills, former US Trade Representative
- Dr. Helmut Kohl, former chancellor of Germany

=== 2004 Global Leadership Award honorees ===
- John W. Madigan, retired chairman and CEO, Tribune Company
- Richard L. Thomas, retired chairman, First Chicago NBD Corporation
- The Honorable Catherine Bertini, former executive director, UN World Food Programme
- The Right Honorable The Lord Robertson of Port Ellen, former secretary general of NATO

=== 2003 Global Leadership Award honorees ===
- John H. Bryan, Retired chairman and CEO, Sara Lee Corporation
- Senator George J. Mitchell, former US senator from Maine
