= Espie =

Espie or Espié is a surname. Notable people with the surname include:

- Colin Espie (born 1957), Scottish neuroscientist
- Jock Espie (1868–1911), Scottish footballer
- Stan Espie, Irish lawn bowl player
- Thierry Espié (born 1952), French motorcycle racer
