= Sleepio =

Digital sleep-improvement program

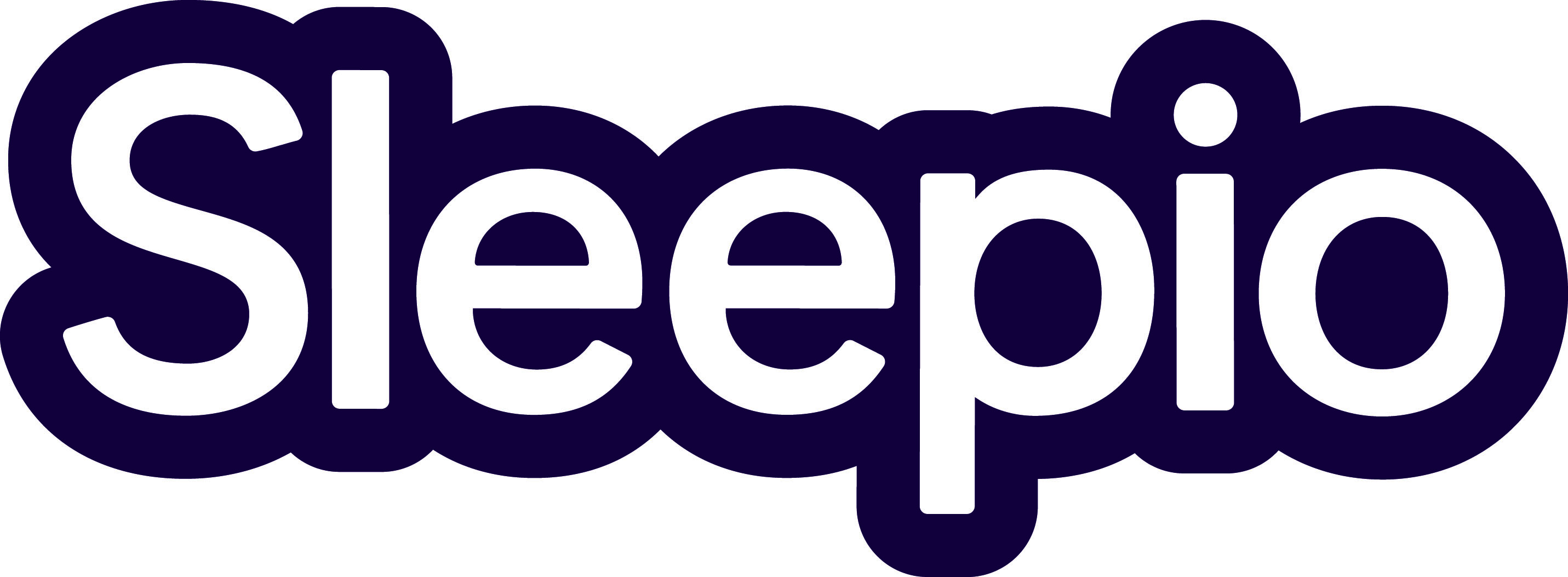
- Founders: Colin Espie, Peter Hames
- Industry: Healthcare
- Website: Sleepio.com
- Launched: 2012

Sleepio is a digital sleep-improvement program featuring cognitive behavioural therapy (CBT) techniques developed by sleep scientist Colin Espie and ex-insomnia sufferer Peter Hames.

Sleepio was tested in a randomized placebo-group clinical trial in 2012. In a commentary on this research published by The Lancet, Sleepio was described as "a proven intervention for sleep disorders using the internet". The journal Nature described Sleepio as "about as effective as CBT delivered in person".

== History ==
Sleepio is the first program from Big Health, the behavioural medicine company co-founded by Professor Colin Espie and Peter Hames.

In March 2013 Sleepio was one of the launch apps in the Apps Library of the UK National Health Service (NHS).

Sleepio was one of ten partners worldwide to launch on Jawbone's UP self-tracking platform in April 2013, allowing import of sleep data collected by the UP activity tracker into Sleepio. Integrated support is also available to users of the BodyMedia FIT band.

Sleepio was available free of charge via the NHS to people over 18 living in the English counties of Oxfordshire, Berkshire and Buckinghamshire.

== How it works ==
The Sleepio program is delivered via the web and via mobile devices. A virtual sleep expert, The Prof, guides the user through six interactive weekly sessions.

The results of the cognitive behavioural therapy group showed Sleepio to be comparable in effectiveness to face-to-face CBT.

A 2020 study involving over 7,000 NHS patients found that a six-week Sleepio treatment was effective, with a success rate of 56% compared to a target success rate of 50%, and a gain of nearly six hours of sleep per week.

== Awards ==
In March 2013, Sleepio was a finalist in the Digital Innovation category at the NHS Innovation EXPO.

In November 2013, Sleepio was the winning "Healthcare IT Product Innovation" as selected by a UK healthcare industry website, E-Health Insider. The start-up was also a semi-finalist in the BIG Awards organised by Cisco Systems, Inc. in 2013.

In April 2014, Sleepio won the Bupa Startup competition at Wired Health.

In June 2014, the company behind the Sleepio program, Big Health, was chosen as the Best Health Startup at The Europas Awards, the annual event honoring the best tech startups in Europe.
