= Peter T. Coleman (academic) =

American psychologist

Peter Thomas Coleman
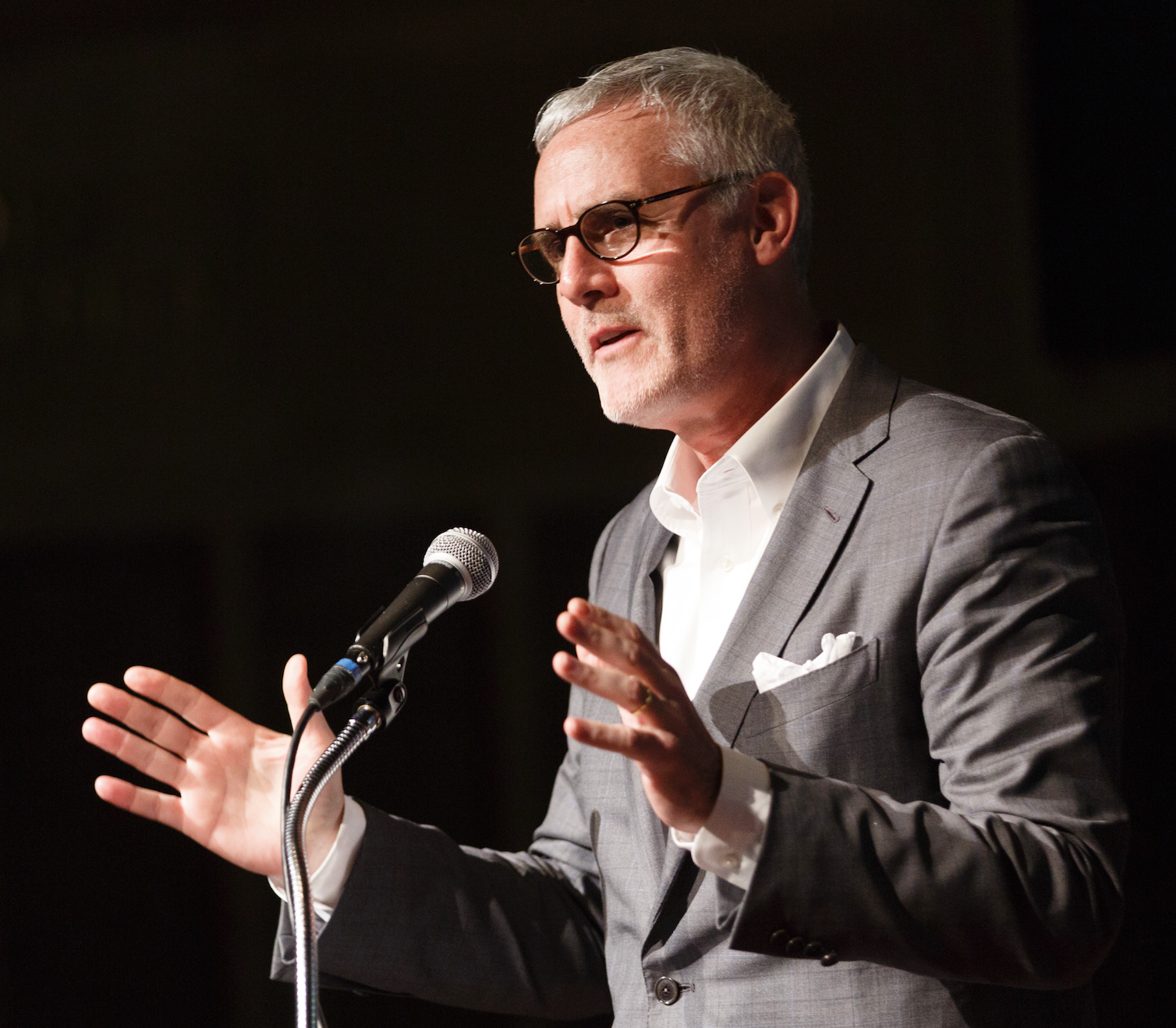
- Born: 9 September 1959 (age 67)
- Education: University of Iowa; Columbia University
- Known for: peace psychology conflict resolution
- Scientific career
- Fields: Psychology
- Workplaces: Columbia University
- Thesis: Psychological resistance to and facilitation of power-sharing in organizations (1997)

Peter Thomas Coleman (born September 9, 1959) is a social psychologist and researcher in the field of conflict resolution and sustainable peace. Coleman is best known for his work on intractable conflicts and applying complexity science.

Coleman is a professor at Columbia University and the executive director of the Advanced Consortium on Cooperation, Conflict, and Complexity (AC4) and the Morton Deutsch International Center for Cooperation and Conflict Resolution. Coleman also serves on the faculty in the Negotiation and Conflict Resolution masters program at Columbia's School of Professional Studies. He also co-founded the Institute for Psychological Science and Practice.

== Career at Columbia University ==
Coleman has been a professor at Columbia University since the 1990s. His early work with Morton Deutsch led to the publication of the first of three editions of The Handbook on Conflict Resolution: Theory and Practice, a comprehensive book designed for professionals in the field of conflict resolution emphasizing the constructive potential of conflict . Coleman has studied some of the more marginalized yet critical aspects of peace and conflict dynamics, including issues such as the use and abuse of social power, intractable conflict, humiliation and conflict, polarized collective identity formation, culture and conflict, injustice and conflict, and sustainable peace. These phenomena can manifest themselves in families, schools and other organizations, communities, and nations. They tend to be complex, long-lasting, and difficult to work with, and thus are relatively understudied by contemporary social scientists. Coleman's approach has been to develop conceptual models that address gaps in existing theory, often through eliciting insights from informed participants (local stakeholders and practitioners), and then to empirically test the models using a variety of methods. His scholarship aims to bridge the theory-practice gap in the field of conflict resolution and peace studies by bringing new insights from research to bear on important technical and social problems, and by honoring practical expertise in the development of new theory.

In the area of conflict intractability, Coleman's work focuses on the dynamics involved in seemingly unsolvable conflicts; both generally as whole systems as well as specifically through the investigation of key components of these problems. This has included research on the underlying motivational processes involved, identity formation and change under these conditions, the role moral emotions play in sustaining such conflicts, and differences in the complexity of the dynamics between more and less destructive forms of conflict. This work culminated into the book, The Five Percent: Finding Solutions to (Seemingly) Impossible Conflicts.

Coleman provides educational instruction for leaders such as the Obama Scholars at Columbia, the Leading Woman Executives program, and the Executive Change Management Leadership program at Columbia.

Coleman serves as a scientific advisor to dozens of nonprofit peace-building groups, including Starts with Us, Fix US, Constructive Dialogue Institute, Search for Common Ground USA, Listen First, Select Committee on the Modernization of Congress, Unite, Generations for Peace, One Small Step (Story Corps), Cascade Institute, Essential Partners, Civic Health Project, Horizons Project, Partners Global, Braver Angels, UJA-Federation, One Million Truths, and American Exchange Project. In 2020, Coleman was asked to advise the Joe Biden presidential transition team on depolarization in the U.S.

== Affiliations and awards ==
In 2015, he received the Morton Deutsch Conflict Resolution Award from the American Psychological Association, Division 48: Society for the Study of Peace, Conflict, and Violence.

In 2000, he received the CPR Institute for Dispute Resolution Book Prize for Excellence for The Handbook of Conflict Resolution: Theory and Practice edited by Morton Deutsch & Peter T. Coleman.

2003, Coleman was the recipient of the first Early Career Award from the American Psychological Association, Division 48: Society for the Study of Peace, Conflict, and Violence.

He is also Founding board member of the Gbowee Peace Foundation USA and a founding member of the United Nations Mediation Support Unit Academic Advisory Council at UNDPA. Coleman currently serves on the editorial boards of Peace and Conflict: Journal of Peace Psychology and Conflict Resolution Quarterly.

== Books ==
- Coleman, Peter T. (2021). The way out: how to overcome toxic polarization. New York (N.Y.): Columbia university press. ISBN 978-0231197403.
- Coleman, Peter T.; Ferguson, Robert (2014). Making conflict work: harnessing the power of disagreement. Boston: Houghton Mifflin Harcourt. ISBN 9780544148390.
- The handbook of conflict resolution: theory and practice (3. ed.). San Francisco, Cal: Jossey-Bass. 2014. ISBN 978-1-118-52686-6.
- Vallacher, Robin R.; Nowak, Andrzej Krzysztof; Coleman, Peter T. (2013). Attracted to conflict: dynamic foundations of destructive social relations. Berlin: Springer. ISBN 978-3-642-35280-5.
- Coleman, Peter T.; Deutsch, Morton (2012). The psychological components of sustainable peace. New York London: Springer. ISBN 978-1-4614-3555-6.
- Conflict, interdependence, and justice: the intellectual legacy of Morton Deutsch. New York Dordrecht, Heidelberg London: Springer. 2011. ISBN 978-1-4939-0148-7.
- Coleman, Peter T. (2011). The five percent: finding solutions to seemingly impossible conflicts (1st ed.). New York: PublicAffairs. ISBN 978-1586489212.
- The handbook of conflict resolution: theory and practice (2. ed.). San Francisco, Calif: Jossey-Bass. 2006. ISBN 978-0787980580.
