= Williametta Saydee-Tarr =

Liberian activist and politician

Minister of Gender, Children and Social Protection
- In office January 2018 – 2024
- President: George Weah

Personal details
- Education: Minneapolis Community and Technical College; University of St. Thomas; University of Minnesota Duluth
- Occupation: Activist; politician

Williametta Saydee-Tarr is a Liberian activist and politician. Educated in the U.S. state of Minnesota, she was Minister of Gender, Children and Social Protection from 2018 until 2024.

== Biography ==
Williametta Saydee-Tarr pursued her post-secondary education in the U.S. state of Minnesota, obtaining her AS in Business Management from the Minneapolis Community and Technical College, BA in Communications Studies from the University of St. Thomas, and master degree in advocacy and political leadership from the University of Minnesota Duluth.

Saydee-Tarr began working in the banking and non-governmental organisational sectors. She became the executive director of Gbowee Peace Foundation Africa, where she promoted both women's education in founder Leymah Gbowee's native Liberia and gender equality, and where she protected communities from the Western African Ebola epidemic. She also worked as an advocate for the African diaspora and restorative justice.

In January 2018, Saydee-Tarr became Minister of Gender, Children and Social Protection in the cabinet formed by newly-elected president George Weah; she was the only woman promoted to minister within the Weah cabinet. In March 2019, she led a Liberian mission at the United Nations Commission on the Status of Women. She was a panelist at the 2019 Young African Women Congress in Accra. She was a facilitator for the Go Girls Lead Mentorship Program, speaking at their 2021 graduation ceremony.

In her capacity as minister, Saydee-Tarr was cited in the media as an expert on sexual and gender-based violence in Liberia. In March 2021, the United States embassy praised her for her work against sexual and gender-based violence in Liberia, citing examples like the government's 2020-2022 Anti-SGBV Roadmap and her 2020 National Call to Action conference.

In 2024, Saydee-Tarr stepped down as minister after Weah was unseated in the 2023 Liberian general election, and the Liberia Anti-Corruption Commission cited her for failing to declare her assets.
