= Targeted reinnervation =

Method of using motorized prosthetic devices for disabled people

Targeted reinnervation enables amputees to control motorized prosthetic devices and regain sensory feedback. The method was developed by Dr. Todd Kuiken at Northwestern University and Rehabilitation Institute of Chicago and Dr. Gregory Dumanian at Northwestern University Division of Plastic Surgery.

== Overview ==
Targeted reinnervation has an efferent and an afferent component. Targeted muscle reinnervation is a method by which a spare muscle (the target muscle) of an amputated patient is denervated (its original nerves cut and/or de-activated), then reinnervated with residual nerves of the amputated limb. The resultant EMG signals of the targeted muscle now represent the motor commands to the missing limb, and are used to drive a motorized prosthetic device.

Targeted sensory reinnervation is a method by which skin near or over the targeted muscle is denervated, then reinnervated with afferent fibers of the remaining hand nerves. Therefore, when this piece of skin is touched, it provides the amputee with a sense of the missing arm or hand being touched.

=== Motivation ===
Several methods exist that seek to achieve advanced control of motorized neural prosthetics. Chronic brain implants record neuronal signals from the motor cortex, while methods such as EEG and fMRI obtain motor commands non-invasively. The recorded signals are decoded into electrical signals, and input into assistive devices or motorized prosthetics. Traditional myoelectric prostheses utilize surface EMG signals from the remains of the amputated limb. For example, a patient may flex a shoulder muscle in order to generate EMG signals that may be used to send “bend elbow” command to the prosthesis. However, there are shortcomings to all of these methods. Chronic implants fail over a period of time because neuronal signal degrade due to tissue immune response to foreign bodies. EEG and fMRI do not obtain as strong signals as direct electrode implant. Traditional myoelectric prostheses are unable to provide multiple control signals simultaneously, thus only one action can be performed at a time. They are also unnatural to use because the users have to use muscles (such as shoulder) that are not normally involved with lower arm functions to control lower arm functions (such as opening and closing hands). The solution to these problems could include a completely different concept of neural interface.

=== Advantages ===
Targeted reinnervation does not require any implants. Therefore, it does not have the issue of tissue foreign body response as chronic brain implant technology does. The targeted muscle acts as a natural amplifier for the neuronal signals produced by the transferred residual nerves. This is an advantage over technologies like EEG and fMRI that utilize weaker signals. With targeted reinnervation, multiple yet independent EMG signals can be produced, thus multiple functions of the artificial limb can be controlled simultaneously. For example, the patient would be able to perform actions such as throwing a ball relatively gracefully, exhibiting simultaneous control of elbow and hand. The control is also intuitive to the patient because the EMG signals are generated by transferred residual limb nerves, unlike traditional myoelectric prosthetics where EMG signals have to be generated by muscles normally not involved in arm or wrist functions. Also, existing commercially available myoelectric prostheses, such as powered wrists, elbows can be used. There is no need to develop specific prostheses for targeted reinnervation. By means of nerve transfer, targeted reinnervation can also provide sensory feedback, which has not been achieved by any other form of prosthetics aforementioned.

== Methods ==
=== Targeted Muscle Reinnervation ===
The goal of targeted muscle reinnervation is to transfer multiple nerves into separate regions of the targeted muscle, record multiple yet independent signals from the muscle regions, and to use the EMG signals to control a motorized prosthesis sophisticated enough to process multiple control signals.

==== Surgical Procedure ====
The requirement to transplant multiple nerves into a muscle region originated from a hypothesis that hyper-reinnervation, by which an excessive amount of motor neurons transferred to a muscle, can increase the reinnervation of muscle fibers hence improving the recovery of paralyzed muscles. The hypothesis was tested on rat skeletal muscles and the result indicated that hyper-reinnervated muscles recovered more muscle mass and strength and more number of motor units were formed.

The first surgical patient was a bilateral shoulder disarticulation amputee. Both arms were entirely amputated at the shoulder level, with only the shoulder blades remaining. The pectoral muscles were chosen targets because they were close to the shoulder, and they were also biologically non-functional due to detachment from the amputated arm. The pectoral muscles were first denervated by cutting the original nerves that innervate them. The proximal ends of the original nerves were ligated to prevent them from reinnervating the pectoral muscle. Then the remnant arm nerves (brachial plexus) were transferred into the pectoral muscles. The musculocutaneous nerve was transferred to the clavicular head of the pectoralis major muscle; the median nerve was transferred to the upper sternal of the pectoralis major muscle; the radial nerve was transferred to the lower sternal head of the pectoralis major muscle. The pectoralis minor muscle was translocated from under the pectorialis major muscle to the lateral chest wall, so that its EMG signals would not interfere with those of the pectoralis major muscle, and it is also a fourth muscle target. The ulnar nerve was then transferred to the moved pectoralis minor muscle. The musculocutaneous, median, radial, and ulnar nerves (brachial plexus) were sewn onto the distal ends of the original pectoral muscle nerve fascicles and onto the muscle itself. Subcutaneous fat over the pectoral muscle was removed so that the electrodes can be as close to the muscle as possible to obtain optimal EMG signals.

==== Post-surgical Training ====
About 3 months after surgery, the patient had the first twitch in pectoral muscle when he attempted to bend his phantom elbow. Five months past surgery, he was able to contract four regions of pectoralis major muscle by attempting different moves. For example, when the patient attempted to bend his elbow, the muscle region beneath the clavicle contracted strongly. This was an indication of successful musculocutaneous nerve transfer because musculocutaneous nerve innervates biceps. The patient was then soon put to a training session and a testing session. During training session, the patient was sitting in an upright position and shown each of the 27 normal movements (such as shoulder adduction/abduction, hand open/close, elbow flexion/extension etc.) on a video. After each demonstration, the patient followed the movement 10 times, exerting a moderate force, held for 2.5 seconds. The patient was given 5 seconds of rest after each attempt. During the test session, the patient performed 5 sets of the 27 movements in random order. He was first shown a video of a movement, then asked to follow the repeated video of the same movement simultaneously after 2 seconds.

==== EMG Recording and Processing ====
A BioSemi Active II system (produced by BioSemi, Amsterdam, Netherlands) and a 127-channel electrode array were used to record monopolar EMG signals while patient was attempting movements during training and testing sessions. One hundred and fifteen electrodes were used to record EMG from the pectoral muscle; two electrodes were used to record from each of the deltoid, latissimus dorsi, supraspinatus, upper trapezius, middle trapezius and lower trapezius muscles. The electrodes were placed at a distance of 15mm from each other. To remove the artifact caused by body movement, the EMG signals were preliminarily filtered with a fifth order butterworth high-pass filter set at 5 Hz.

The major contaminant of the EMG signal was the ECG artifact. To remove ECG noise, an ECG template was constructed by averaging ECG complexes recorded when muscles were relaxed. The time between each ECG complex was used to calculate a representative inter-spike-interval. Detection of ECG spikes was calculated from the correlations between EMG and the ECG template. A threshold was set so that signals exceeding the threshold were marked as possible ECG spikes. The inter-spike-intervals of the possible spikes were then compared to the previously calculated representative inter-spike-interval to determine whether the possible spikes were to be accepted as ECG artifacts.

Another major task of processing the EMG signals is to eliminate crosstalk from other muscles. First, positions of and distance between electrodes are empirically determined to obtain strongest EMG thus least crosstalk. Setting a threshold above background noise and crosstalk from other muscles also helps eliminating crosstalk. Smaller muscle size and subcutaneous fat facilitate crosstalk. With a minimal level of less than 3mm subcutaneous fat, crosstalk is expected to be minimal in an area of 2–3 cm diameter.

==== Prosthetic Components ====
After surgery, the patient was fitted with his pre-surgery body-powered prosthesis on the right side and an experimental myoelectric prosthesis consisted of a Griefer terminal device, a power wrist rotator, a Boston digital arm, and an LTI-Collier Shoulder joint on the left side. Three strongest EMG signals were chosen from the successful nerve transfers: the musculocutaneous nerve, the median nerve and the radial nerve. The EMG resulting from contraction of muscle reinnvervated by median nerve was used to control hand closing movement; the EMG from musculocutaneous nerve was used to control elbow bending; the EMG from radial nerve was used to control wrist rotation and flexion.

The performances of these two prostheses were compared with a box-and-blocks test, where the patient was allowed 2 minutes to move one-inch cubes from one box to another, over a short wall. The result was quantified by the total number of blocks moved. To test the terminal device (“hand”), elbow and wrist rotator, the patient was administered a clothes-pin test, where he was asked to pick up clothes pins from a horizontal bar, rotate them, then put them on a higher vertical bar. The time used to move 3 clothes-pins was recorded. Both tests were repeated 3 times. The quantified results showed that the myoelectric prosthesis performed 246% better (moved 2.46 times more blocks) in box-and-blocks test, and 26.3% better (used 26.3% less time in moving clothes pins) in clothes-pin test.

An experimental six-motor prosthesis was also constructed. The most striking feature of targeted reinnervation compared to traditional myoelectric prosthetics is its ability to provide multiple signals to control multiple functions simultaneously. Although current myoelectric prostheses can be used directly, they are designed and aimed at traditional myoelectric control. Thus, the only commercially available prosthesis only has powered terminal device (often a hook), wrist rotation and powered elbow. To fully utilize the multiple signals provided by targeted reinnervation, an experimental prosthesis was constructed with added power components: a TouchEMAS shoulder, a humeral rotator, and a hand capable of opening and closing with wrist flexion/extension function. The elbow and hand functions were driven by four nerve transfer signals, and the humeral rotation was driven by EMG from latissumus dorsi and deltoids. With this six-motor prosthesis, the patient could control multiple joints at the same time and perform new tasks that could not be accomplished with other prostheses, such as reaching out to pick up objects and putting on a hat.

=== Targeted Sensory Reinnervation ===
==== Discovery ====
Targeted sensory reinnervation was discovered by accident. While receiving an alcohol rub on his chest after the surgery, the patient described a sensation of being touched on the pinky. The explanation for this phenomenon is that, since his subcutaneous fat was removed during surgery, his chest skin was denervated. Thus, the afferent nerve fibers regenerated through the pectoral muscle, reinnervating the skin over the muscle. Since then, areas of the pectoral muscle have been mapped to parts of arm and hand according to patient's description of touch sensations he felt. When touched in a specific region on the pectoral muscle, the patient would describe where in the phantom limb he felt as being touched. For example, when touched in a region immediately above the nipple, he felt as if his anterior forearm was being touched.

==== Surgical Procedure ====
With this discovery, the team set out to perform nerve transfer surgery specifically aimed to reinnervate sensory feedback. A piece of skin near or over the targeted muscle was denervated, thus the afferent nerve fibers were allowed to reinnervate the skin. In a case of a woman patient with left arm amputation at the humeral neck, the supraclavicular sensory nerve was cut, the proximal end was ligated to prevent regeneration and reinnervation, and the distal end was coapted end-to-side to the ulnar nerve. The intercostobrachial cutaneous nerve was treated with the same method, with the distal end coapted to the median nerve.

This technique has been dubbed “transfer sensation”, and it has the potential of providing useful sensory feedback, such as pressure sensing, to help the patient judge the amount of force to be exerted.

==== Assessment and Results ====
After surgery, the patient was asked to identify the chest areas with most prominent sensation of individual digits, which were then mapped onto a diagram. The characteristic of the sensory reinnervation was quantified. Light touch is quantified by a threshold determined with Semmes-Weinstein monofilaments (a sensation measurement instrument). A Neurotip neurometer was used to determine the sensibility of sharpness and dullness at 20 sites distributed throughout the targeted muscle (the chest). A tuning fork was pressed against the points on the chest to assess patient's ability to detect vibration. A TSA II NeuroSensory Analyzer was used to assess temperature thresholds at two points on the chest. The patient's other (normal) pectoral muscle, normal arm and hand are used as controls.

The patient was able to perceive all modalities of cutaneous sensation. However, instead of normal pressure sensing, she perceived tingling in response to touch on the targeted chest skin. The lowest threshold above which light touch could be sensed in the target muscle was 0•4 g, while the control chest muscle had a light-touch threshold of 0•16 g; the thresholds were under 4 g at most points in the area while the control chest had a threshold of 0.4 g at its counterpart locations. The control chest demonstrated a much lower threshold hence higher sensibility. The patient was able to discern increasing, graded pressure. She felt more tingling as the test pressure increased. The patient also demonstrated perception of temperature. The mean threshold for coldness perception was 29•1 °C in the target muscle, and 29•9 °C in the control chest muscle. The mean threshold for warmth perception was 35•2 °C in the target muscle, and 34•7 °C in the control chest muscle. The patient was able to discern between sharp and dull stimuli and detect vibration at 19 of the 20 points selected for testing. All the above sensations perceived by the patient were described by the patient as occurring in her phantom hand.

== Risks and Complications ==
With extraordinary successes came certain risks and failures. The general risks of the surgery, in addition to standard risks of surgery, include permanent paralysis of the target muscle, recurrence of phantom limb pain, and development of painful neuromas.

With the first patient, the ulnar nerve transfer was not successful. The muscle region was not reinnervated as expected, but instead turned bluish after mobilization, possibly due to a congestion of vascular supply.

With the left-arm amputation woman mentioned above, her phantom limb pain returned after surgery. Though at a lesser degree and resolved within 4 weeks, it still presented a serious risk because it is unclear whether it will resolve in other future patients. Additionally, surgery was unsuccessful with a patient because severe nerve injuries were not detectable until during the surgery.

It also remains in speculation whether the transferred nerves would survive permanently.

== Future Research and Development ==
The team has now moved onto a trial with transhumeral amputees (amputation above the elbow), with the hope that median nerve transfer in transradial amputation could potentially provide thumb control. With all previous patients being upper limb amputees, the team also hopes to move on to lower limb amputees eventually.

The nerves could also be further split to provide even more independent signals, so that more functions can be controlled simultaneously and more degrees of freedom can be gained in prosthesis control. This could also prompt the production of more sophisticated prosthetic devices with more degrees of freedom, such as the six-motor experimental prosthesis mentioned above.

Targeted reinnervation could also utilize implantable electrodes to record more localized signals from the target muscle, so that crosstalk can be further mitigated.

Much work is still to be done to translocate the sensory feedback from the reinnervated target muscle to the actual prosthesis, or to construct prostheses that are capable of providing appropriate stimuli to the reinnervated target muscle according to the external stimuli received, so that the sensory feedback of the arm comes from its native physical position.

Beginning in 2016, the Applied Physics Laboratory at Johns Hopkins began working with a patient having undergone both targeted muscle reinnervation and osseointegration of a titanium port to test and perfect their design for the Modular Prosthetic Limb funded by DARPA
