= Mark Stephen Meadows =

American author and artist (born 1968)

- Other name: pighed
- Known for: Pause & Effect; I, Avatar; We, Robot; 7Fables; Tea Time with Terrorists
- Awards: Ars Electronica Golden Nica:
- Website: www.markmeadows.com

Mark Stephen Meadows (born September 28, 1968) is an American author, inventor, artist and researcher at NASA Convergent Aeronautics Solutions.

He is the author of over five books and inventor of patents relating to artificial intelligence, blockchain and avatars. He lectures internationally on this work as well as the intersection of art, technology and culture.

In addition to inventing software, writing books and developing artwork, Meadows is also known for his worldly adventures, specifically for hitchhiking to Baghdad in 2003, interviewing terrorists and sailing voyages. He holds a USCG captain's license and has lived aboard his sailboat since 2006.

== Career ==
In 1993 Meadows helped design WELL.com, the world's third dot-com, and also helped develop the first open-protocol 3D multi-user environment in 1995. He worked as researcher and artist at Xerox-PARC, as Creative Director for a Stanford Research Institute venture, and as creative director and co-founder of a VR and Internet company, which he co-founded, named Construct. In 2001 he opened a gallery in Paris where he sold his paintings for two years before spending time in the Waag Society in Amsterdam, Netherlands as a researcher.

In 2010 Meadows founded Botanic Technologies, a US corporation dedicated to developing conversational avatars for use in education and video games. The company worked with a range of European, American and Asian organizations, ranging from Fortune 100 multinationals to small startups, researching and prototyping experimental products. Botanic Technologies spun off several other companies, the most notable being SEED Token, a blockchain organization which offered natural language processing and animation libraries for conversational characters.

From 2020 to 2022 Meadows lead teams building avatars for social media, educational and gaming purposes.

In December 2022 Meadows began working at NASA Research as Science Fiction Author and Researcher. The research role reports to Convergent Aeronautics Solutions, a NASA incubator for disruptive and game-changing technologies within the NASA Aeronautics Research Mission Directorate.

== Books ==
Pause & Effect is Meadows' first book which addresses narrative, visual art and video games.

His second book, I, Avatar is a first-person travelogue of Second Life and an examination of the culture and consequences of using avatars in virtual worlds.

Tea Time With Terrorists is a travelogue of Sri Lanka and study of the Tamil militant movement. This project deviates from other work by Meadows in addressing a more physical reality.

We, Robot, published in 2010, is Meadows' fourth book addresses the emergence of robots and societal impacts.

Other publications include nearly a dozen patents, an unpublished travelogue of Iraq and a book of illustrated fables, titled 7Fables. Meadows is represented by Renee Zuckerbrot, New York, NY.

== Art ==
Since 1987, Meadows has been selling his artwork in galleries and museums throughout the United States and Europe. He has received awards from Ars Electronica, and the Cooper-Hewitt National Design Museum, among others.

== Education ==
Meadows completed his BA in math, philosophy and literature from St. John's College in Santa Fe, New Mexico. He also received an MFA at The San Francisco Art Institute (painting and photography) and studied at Harvard University (biology), University of Colorado (philosophy), and Bemis Art School (painting).

== Awards ==
Meadows has received the following awards:

- Ars Electronica, Golden Nica, Linz, Austria: 1999
- Stanford Digital Art Center, Stanford CA: 1998
- NII Award Arts & Entertainment, Los Angeles CA: 1997
- Cooper-Hewitt National Design Museum, New York NY: 1997
- Electronic Arts Awards, SF Focus/Stoli Vodka, San Francisco CA: 1997
- Thomas J. Watson Fellowship, New York NY: 1993
- Art Institute Of Chicago, Chicago IL: 1986
