= Columbia University School of Professional Studies =

Academic unit of Columbia University

- Type: Private graduate school
- Established: 1995; 31 years ago
- Parent institution: Columbia University
- Dean: Troy Eggers
- Postgraduates: 4,021 (Fall 2022)
- Location: New York, New York, United States
- Campus: Urban
- Website: sps.columbia.edu

The Columbia University School of Professional Studies (SPS) is one of the seventeen schools comprising Columbia University. It offers eighteen master's degrees programs, certificate programs, pre-college programs, graduate school preparation, summer courses, postbaccalaureate studies, auditing programs, executive education, and English as a second language programs.

== History ==
The predecessor of the School of Professional Studies was first established as the Division of Special Programs in 1995 and offered several non-degree and summer programs. Frank Wolf was the first dean.

Over the next five years the school expanded to offer programs focused in graduate preparation and career advancement. In 2002, the university's board of trustees granted final approval for the creation of the School of Continuing Education, the first new school at Columbia in 50 years. With this new status, the School became both a Faculty and a Department of Instruction in the Arts and Sciences, and was granted authority to offer the Master of Science degree. In the course of 2002–2006 it expanded its graduate offerings to eight M.S. Programs. A cross‑enrollment agreement with Union Theological Seminary was also established in 2002.

In 2015, the School's incoming Dean, Jason Wingard announced that the School of Continuing Education was renamed the School of Professional Studies.

During the 2021–2022 academic year, the school's 1,384 graduates represented 11.7 percent of the 11,836 postgraduate degrees conferred across all of Columbia University's graduate and professional schools.

== Academic programs ==
As of 2023, the school offers master's degrees in actuarial science, applied analytics, bioethics, construction administration, enterprise risk management, human capital management, information and knowledge strategy, insurance management, narrative medicine, negotiation and conflict resolution, nonprofit management, political analytics, sport management, strategic communication, sustainability management, sustainability science, technology management, and wealth management.

== Student outcomes ==
The 2025 career outcomes released by the school's Career Design Lab show that 85.6% of students surveyed reported they were employed at the time they graduated.

According to the report, postgraduates were earning an average annual base salary of $95,460.

== Rankings ==
In 2016, SportBusiness International (now SportBusiness) ranked the School's Sports Management program second in the world.

In 2020, the School's Negotiation and Conflict Resolution master's program was named the #1 Best Master's in Negotiation and Conflict Management degrees in the United States by College Choice.

In 2021, the School's Construction Administration master's program was ranked #1 and topped the list of 25 Best Master's in Construction Management, compiled by Great Business Schools. College Choice also ranked it #1 amongst the Best Master's Program in Construction Management.

In 2021, the School's Sustainability Management master's program was named #2 in the United States on Great Business Schools' list of the best Environmental & Sustainability Management Master's Programs.

== Notable faculty ==
- Jeffrey Sachs – University Professor and Director of the Earth Institute, Faculty in the Bioethics Program
- Rita Charon – Professor of Medicine, Founder and Executive Director of the Narrative Medicine Program
- Peter T. Coleman – Professor of Psychology and Education, Lecturer in Negotiation and Conflict Resolution
- Jason Wingard - Professor of Human Capital Management
- Robert Klitzman - Academic Director, M.S. in Bioethics Program
- Geovanny Vicente - Associate lecturer, M.S. in Enterprise Risk Management Program

== Notable alumni ==
- Kira Peikoff – Journalist and Author (Bioethics '15)
- Andrew Hawkins – Former NFL player (Sports Management '17)
- Mo'ne Davis — Professional Women’s Baseball Player (Sports Management '24)
