= Nancy Y. Bekavac =

American lawyer and college president

Nancy Bekavac

6th President of Scripps College
- In office July 1, 1990 – June 30, 2007
- Preceded by: E. Howard Brooks
- Succeeded by: Frederick Weis

Personal details
- Born: Clairton, Pennsylvania, U.S.
- Education: Swarthmore College (BA); Yale University (JD)
- Occupation: Higher education consultant
- Known for: First woman to be named president of Scripps College

Nancy Y. Bekavac was an American academic and lawyer who served as the sixth president of Scripps College, the first woman to hold that position. She began her tenure on July 1, 1990, and concluded it on June 30, 2007. Scripps College is a liberal arts women's college in Claremont, California.

== Early life and education ==
Bekavac was born and raised in Clairton, Pennsylvania, a suburb of Pittsburgh, where her family ran the Bekavac Funeral Home. She graduated from Clairton High School in 1965. She earned a bachelor's degree from Swarthmore College where she graduated Phi Beta Kappa in 1969, and she graduated from Yale Law School in 1973.

She was one of four Swarthmore College team members on the weekly College Bowl "quiz" show during the 1968–1969 season that defeated competing teams for five consecutive weeks. She also received a Watson Fellowship, traveling in South Asia and Eastern Europe. At Yale Law School, she was a classmate of Hillary Clinton and future president Bill Clinton.

== Scripps College ==
In 1990 as a result of Scripps alumni pushing for a woman president, Nancy Bekavac became the sixth president of Scripps College. During her tenure, the endowment of Scripps College increased from $57 million to $230 million, student enrollment increased from 630 to 880, and applications doubled to 1,900. Student quality also increased: first-year students now have combined median SAT scores of 1350, up from 1140 in 1991. Scripps also has more National Merit Finalists than any other women's college in the nation.

In 2003, Scripps College Summer Academy began an annual two-week residential program for underserved high school students.

Many changes were made to the physical structure of the campus during Bekavac's tenure. The college's physical plant was extended and improved. In 1994, the Millard Sheets Art Center was opened. In 2000, the Malott Commons was opened for college-wide dining and special programs. Also in 2000, a new residence hall (Gabrielle Jungels-Winkler Hall) was opened and the former President's House on campus was renamed as the Ellen Clark Revelle House. In 2001, a 25-meter swimming pool was built, and in 2006 ground was broken for the Sallie Tiernan Field House, a recreation and athletic center with a woman-friendly environment. The Field House now accommodates nutrition and health classes and includes workout rooms.

== Career ==
She practiced law in Los Angeles, and was a partner at the firm now known as Munger, Tolles & Olson; she was Director of the Thomas J. Watson Fellowship, and was counselor to the president of Dartmouth College prior to her appointment as president of Scripps College. She is currently RIT Kosovo Trustee Chair.
