= Watson Foundation =

Charitable trust honoring Thomas J. Watson

Thomas J. Watson Foundation
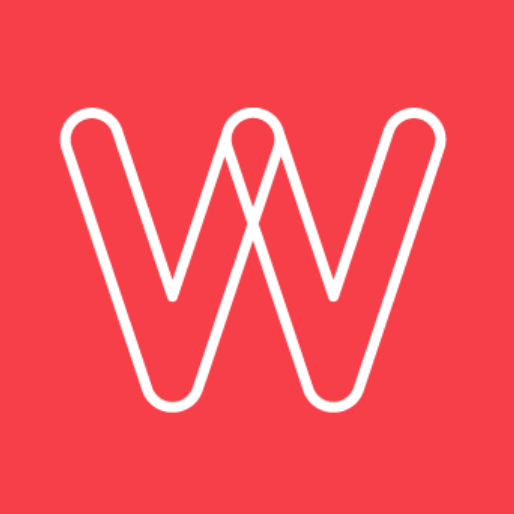
- Founded: 1961; 65 years ago
- Founders: Jeannette K. Watson
- Location: Woolworth Building, New York, New York, U.S.
- Website: watson.foundation

The Thomas J. Watson Foundation is a charitable trust formed 1961 in honor of former chairman and CEO of IBM, Thomas J. Watson. The Watson Foundation operates two programs, the Thomas J. Watson Fellowship and the Jeannette K. Watson Fellowship.

The two programs were based in Providence and New York City, but in 2006 the two fellowships were united in New York.

In 2018 the Watson Foundation celebrated its 50th anniversary. The Foundation moved into its new offices in New York's Woolworth Building that same year.

== Thomas J. Watson Fellowship ==
The Thomas J. Watson Fellowship is a grant that enables graduating seniors to pursue a year of independent study outside the United States. 1968 was the Fellowship's first year, providing graduates with a year to "explore with thoroughness a particular interest, test their aspirations and abilities, view their lives and American society in greater perspective and, concomitantly, develop a more informed sense of international concern." In 2018, the fellowship celebrated its 50th anniversary. In that time, over 42,000 students submitted applications, and nearly 2,000 fellowships were awarded, making the fellowship similarly selective to the Rhodes or Marshall Scholarships. Unlike those programs, only undergraduates in their senior year at 41 colleges are eligible to apply.

=== Background ===
The fellowship grants awarded fellows a stipend to spend one year traveling in pursuit of their projects. Recipients are forbidden from reentering the United States and their home country for one year. Projects are not academically oriented, as the fellowship is intended to encourage exploration and new experiences rather than formal research. Currently the award is $40,000 per fellow or $50,000 for a fellow traveling with a spouse or dependent. The stipend also provides student loan repayment for the duration of the fellowship. The Watson Foundation emphasizes that the grant is an investment in a person rather than a project. During their travels the Fellows remain unaffiliated with a college or university, instead planning and administering their projects themselves. They are barred from working on a paying job, and are discouraged from joining organized volunteer projects for substantial periods of time.

=== Selection criteria ===
Qualities sought in fellows include: Leadership, Imagination, Independence, Emotional Maturity, Courage, Integrity, Resourcefulness, and Responsibility. Institutions eligible to nominate Watson Fellows are 41 select small liberal arts colleges with an undergraduate population of fewer than 3,000 students.

=== Notable Watson Fellows ===
- Layla AbdelRahim, comparatist anthropologist and author
- David Abram, cultural ecologist and philosopher
- Jay Allison, independent public radio producer
- Nancy Bekavac, former president of Scripps College
- Iram Parveen Bilal, filmmaker and entrepreneur
- Kai Bird, Pulitzer Prize–winning author and columnist
- Lynn J. Bush, American federal senior judge
- Gloria Borger, CNN political commentator
- Ian Boyden, painter
- Roberto Castillo, novelist, short fiction writer, translator and essayist
- Peter Child, professor of music at MIT and composer in residence with the New England Philharmonic
- Tom Cole, U.S. Congressman from Oklahoma
- Darron Collins, President, College of the Atlantic
- Nicolas Collins, composer of mostly electronic music
- Howard Fineman, Huffington Post and MSNBC political analyst
- John Garang, late Commander-in-Chief of the Sudanese People's Liberation Army and Vice-President of Sudan
- Yishay Garbasz, artist and activist.
- David Grann, American journalist and best-selling author
- Aracelis Girmay, American poet
- Alia Gurtov, American paleoanthropologist
- Dan Hammer, environmental economist and winner of the inaugural Pritzker Award
- Tori Haring-Smith, former president of Washington & Jefferson College
- Corey Harris, blues and reggae musician and MacArthur Fellow.
- Garrett Hongo, Pulitzer-nominated poet and academic
- Barbara Higbie, jazz and traditional musician
- Edward Hirsch, poet, president of the John Simon Guggenheim Memorial Foundation
- Jackie Diamond Hyman, American novelist and reporter
- Pat Irwin, composer, musician, and former member of the B-52s
- Cleveland Johnson, director, National Music Museum
- Mat Johnson, writer
- Ian Kerner, New York Times bestselling author
- Raffi Khatchadourian, American journalist
- Verlyn Klinkenborg, author and Guggenheim Fellow
- Jimmy J. Kolker, U.S. Ambassador to Uganda (2002-5) and Burkina Faso (1999-2002)
- Chris Kratt, host of Wild Kratts and other educational nature shows
- Edwin M. Lee, mayor of San Francisco
- Joe Lewis, former dean of UC Irvine Claire Trevor School of the Arts
- Jason Mantzoukas, actor and writer
- Ed Martin, acting U.S. Attorney for the District of Columbia
- Mark Stephen Meadows, American artist and entrepreneur
- Jonathan Meiburg, lead singer and principal songwriter for the band Shearwater
- Michael Noer, executive news editor at Forbes
- Dan O'Brien, playwright and poet
- John Payton, civil rights attorney
- Peggy Pettitt, American actor, dancer, and storyteller
- Steve Raichlen, BBQ chef, author, and PBS cooking show host
- Eric Rosengren, President and CEO of the Federal Reserve Bank of Boston
- Suzanne Seriff, folklorist, cultural anthropologist, museum curator
- Caroline Shaw, 2013 Pulitzer Prize for music
- David Shipley, The New York Times Op-Ed Editor
- John Siceloff, American television producer
- Alan Solomont, U.S. Ambassador to Spain (2009 - 2013)
- Julie Taymor, Oscar-nominated, Emmy- and Tony Award-winning director
- Francisco Valero-Cuevas, engineer and scientist
- Reetika Vazirani, American/Indian poet
- Madhuri Vijay, novelist, author of The Far Field
- Eileen Wilson-Oyelaran, former president of Kalamazoo College

=== Directors of the Thomas J. Watson Fellowship ===
- Chris Kasabach, 2011-Present
- Cleveland Johnson, 2008-2011
- Rosemary Macedo, 2006-2008
- Beverly J. Larson, 2003-2006
- Norv Brasch, 2001-2003
- Tori Haring-Smith, 1999-2001
- Noreen C. Tuross, 1997-1999
- William F. L. Moses, 1995-1997
- James A. Lehman, 1993-1995
- Mary E. Brooner, 1991-1993
- Steven V. Licata, 1989-1991
- Martin A. Brody, 1987-1989
- Nancy Y. Bekavac, 1985-1987
- Joseph V. Long III, 1883-1985
- Jeanne C. Olivier, 1981-1983
- David C. Summers, 1979-1981
- John C. Elder, 1977-1979
- Daniel L. Arnaud, 1972-1977
- Robert O. Schulze, Founding Director, 1968-1972

== Jeannette K. Watson Fellowship ==
In 1999, the Jeannette K. Watson Fellowship was created to expose undergraduate students to work through three successive summer internships and mentorship. The fellowship is a competitive academic grant made each year to fifteen undergraduates nominated by 12 affiliated New York City colleges which provides successive summer experiences for three years, stipends, mentoring, seminars, and discovery fund.

The fellowship is named after Jeannette K. Watson, the first female member of the IBM Board of Directors, and wife of Thomas J. Watson.

During their first summer, Jeannette K. Watson Fellows intern at a New York City based partner, while the second and third summers can be in New York City, anywhere else in the United States, or overseas. Over the three year fellowship, fellows must go overseas at least once. Fellows are awarded three successive annual grants of $7,500, $9,000, $10,000 in addition to a $2,000 discovery fund. Fellows have gone on to win prestigious awards like the Harry S. Truman Scholarship, the Fulbright Program, and The Paul & Daisy Soros Fellowships for New Americans. They have also gone on to graduate from school at the University of Oxford, Harvard University, and the University of California, Los Angeles.

=== Selection criteria ===
Qualities sought include high standards, ambition, openness, desire to explore diverse cultures and new professional fields, willingness to act on feedback, leadership, ability to work in groups, integrity and accountability, and a strong academic record. The following 12 partnering colleges nominate up to four candidates to be considered in a citywide selections process.

=== Eligible institutions ===
- Baruch College
- Brooklyn College
- City College of New York
- College of Staten Island
- Hunter College
- John Jay College
- Lehman College
- Long Island University, Brooklyn Campus
- Marymount Manhattan College
- Pace University Manhattan
- St. John's University
- Queens College

=== History ===
The Fellowship was established by the Thomas J. Watson Foundation in 1999. Its founding Director, the late Alice Stone Ilchman, former President of Sarah Lawrence College and Elizabeth Buckner, former Board of Advisors member, developed the original idea for the Fellowship and began working with eight colleges. Frank Wolf, its second director, served from 2006 until his retirement in 2012. Dean Emeritus of the School of Continuing Education at Columbia University, Wolf extended participation to four additional New York City colleges and expanded substantially the Fellowship's internships in the for-profit sector. In 2012 the Foundation combined the directorships of its two programs with the appointment of Chris Kasabach as the Executive Director of the Thomas J. Watson Foundation.

=== Directors of the Jeannette K. Watson Fellowship ===
- Sara Nolfo, 2016–present
- Frank Wolf, 2006-2012
- Alice Ilchman, Founding Director, 1999-2006
