= BodyMedia =

Technology company

- Type: Delaware Corporation
- Industry: Technology, weight management, health care
- Founded: 1999
- Founder: John Stivoric (CTO); Astro Teller; Chris Pacione; Chris Kasabach
- Headquarters: Pittsburgh
- Key people: Christine Robins (CEO); John Stivoric (CTO); Jay Katarincic (Chairman)
- Number of employees: 60
- Website: www.BodyMedia.com

BodyMedia was a medical and consumer technology company headquartered in Pittsburgh, Pennsylvania. Incorporated in 1999, BodyMedia developed wearable body monitoring systems. In April 2013, BodyMedia was acquired by Jawbone for an estimated $100 million.

== History ==
=== Wearable device ===
BodyMedia staff published some of the first research on wearability of devices in 1998 and detecting activity context using accelerometers in 1999 at the 2nd and 3rd IEEE sponsored International Symposium on Wearable Computers. The BodyMedia informatics group made available a large anonymised human physiology data set for the 2004 International Conference on Machine Learning, running a Machine Learning Challenge. They published about their very large data set and data modeling methodology at the Innovative Applications of Artificial Intelligence conference in 2011 winning the IAAI Deployed Application award.

=== Clinical history ===
Between 2001 and 2005, BodyMedia provided healthcare professionals with metabolic assessment and behavioral therapy products for the treatment of obesity, diabetes, and CVD. BodyMedia have been used in hundreds of clinical studies. The U.S. Food and Drug Administration (FDA) classifies BodyMedia as a Class II Medical Device.

BodyMedia was demonstrated to be accurate in comparison to the doubly labeled water method for measuring energy expenditure per day. The mean absolute-percent difference per-person per-day in Kcalories was less than 10%. It was also shown that the standard WHO GPAQ survey underestimates physical activity bouts of at least 10 minutes. The clinical and research software and armband were marketed under the "SenseWear" brand and have since been used e.g. to estimate exposure to air pollution in combination with other sensors.

=== Consumer products ===
BodyMedia sold a consumer software product for armband hardware starting in 2001. A consumer web site using BodyMedia armbands was branded; run in the US by "Dot Fit". In the UK a consumer web site is branded and run by "Ki Performance".

== See also ==
- Quantified self
