= Purdue Pegboard Test =

Test of dexterity

- Purpose: manual dexterity

The Purdue Pegboard Test is a psychomotor test of manual dexterity and bimanual coordination. The test involves two different abilities: gross movements of arms, hands, and fingers, and fine motor extremity, also called "fingerprint" dexterity. Poor Pegboard performance is a sign of deficits in complex, visually guided, or coordinated movements that are likely mediated by circuits involving the basal ganglia.

== History ==
Joseph Tiffin, an Industrial Psychologist at Purdue University, designed the test in 1948. It was originally intended for assessing the dexterity of assembly line workers.

== Method and interpretation ==
The pegboard consists of a board with two parallel rows with 25 holes into which cylindrical metal pegs are placed by the examinee. The test involves a total of four trials. To begin, there is a brief practice. The subsets for preferred, non-preferred, and both hands require the patient to place the pins in the holes as quickly as possible, with the score being the number of pins placed in 30 seconds.

=== Neurocognitive disorders ===
The Purdue Pegboard test predicted worse adult tic severity and correlated with tic severity at the time of childhood assessment.

Purdue Pegboard performance deficiencies have been linked to poor social functioning in schizophrenia.

=== Industry ===
Results from a correlation analysis suggested that a person's capability on the Purdue Pegboard Test is a good predictor of their ability to use a mobile phone in cold weather.

== Reliability ==
One-trial administration of the Purdue Pegboard Test produced test-retest reliability of 0.60 to 0.79. The three-trial administration test-retest reliability ranged from 0.82 to 0.91.
