= Astro Teller =

British-American computer scientist (born 1970)

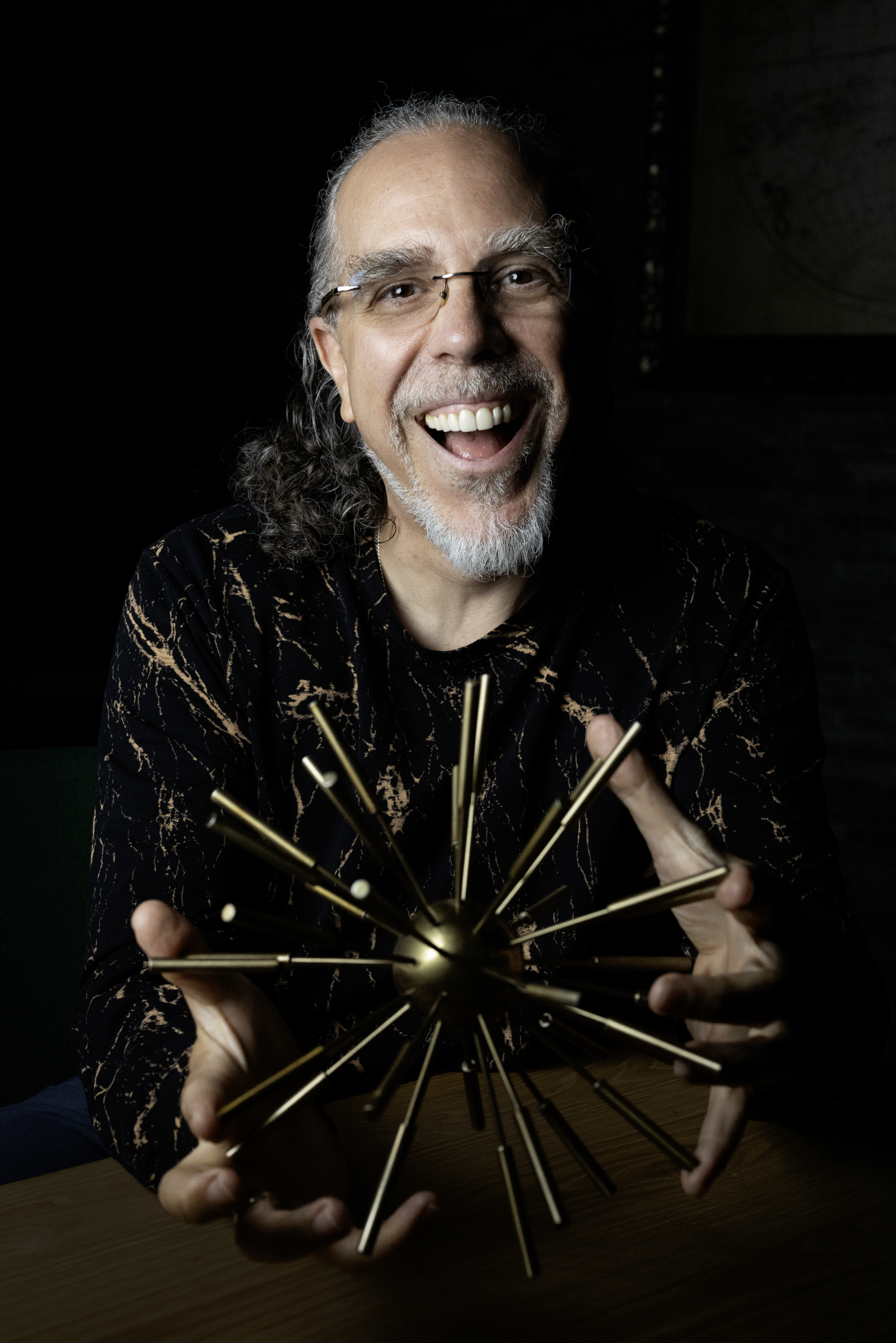
- Teller in 2025
- Born: Eric Teller; 29 May 1970 (age 56); Cambridge, England
- Education: Stanford University (BS, MS); Carnegie Mellon University (PhD)
- Known for: BodyMedia, Google X
- Spouse: Danielle Teller (m. 2012)
- Awards: Hertz Fellowship
- Scientific career
- Workplaces: Stanford University; X Development
- Thesis: Algorithm evolution with internal reinforcement for signal understanding (1998)
- Doctoral advisor: Manuela M. Veloso
- Website: astroteller.net

Eric "Astro" Teller (born 29 May 1970) is an American entrepreneur, computer scientist, and author, with expertise in the field of intelligent technology.

== Early life and education ==
Teller was born in Cambridge, England, and raised in Evanston, Illinois. He is the son of Paul Teller, who was an instructor in the philosophy of science at the University of Illinois at Chicago and Chantal DeSoto, a buyer and clothing designer for Sears who later became a teacher of gifted children. His grandparents include French economist and mathematician Gérard Debreu and Hungarian-born American theoretical physicist Edward Teller. He received the nickname "Astro" after high school friends compared his flat-top haircut to AstroTurf, and he reportedly had the image of cartoon dog Astro from The Jetsons painted on his car door in college.

Teller holds a Bachelor of Science in computer science from Stanford University, Master of Science in symbolic computation (symbolic and heuristic computation), also from Stanford, and a PhD in artificial intelligence from Carnegie Mellon University, where he received a Hertz fellowship. (Note: The Hertz Foundation provides financial and fellowship support to remarkable PhD students in the physical, biological and engineering sciences.)

== Career and moonshots ==
After working as a faculty member at Stanford University, Teller became a business executive.

Since 2010, he has directed Google X (which has become X, The Moonshot Factory) laboratories. Projects at Google X include Google Glass, Google Self-Driving Car Project, Google Contact Lens and Project Loon. Google X spun its project called Flux out into a stand-alone business in 2012. Teller gave a TED Talk at TED2016 on the importance of failure in Google X's approach to pioneering new projects.

== Entrepreneur ==
Teller was the co-founder and chairman of BodyMedia, makers of the BodyMedia FIT, Bodybugg, and Sensewear armbands (wearable devices that measure sleep, perspiration, motion, and calories burned).

He is also co-founder, director, and former CEO of Cerebellum Capital.

== Speaker ==
In May 2001, Teller was featured on NPR's radio program All Things Considered, discussing how the good economy has shaped the attitudes of 30-year-olds towards their jobs. He was the co-founder and co-host of the Solve for X annual event and internet community.

He has lectured at the TEDMED Conference (2003 and 2004), South By Southwest (2013), and ideaCity (2004). In 2008, he appeared as a political commentator on the national French television station France 24.

== Author ==
Teller's novel, Exegesis, was published in 1997. It was translated into Dutch, Japanese, Danish, German, Italian and Greeklish.

A second novel, Among These Savage Thoughts, was published in 2006. An experimental novel, it deals with the protagonist's journey to reinvent himself in the imaginary mountain society of Karabas.

His third book, Sacred Cows, is a non-fiction work examining society's attitudes about marriage and divorce, co-written with his wife Danielle Teller. It was published by Diversion Books in 2014; in the same year, he gave a TEDxBoston talk on the book.

== Personal life ==
Teller is married to Danielle Teller.
