= Layla AbdelRahim =

Canadian comparatist anthropologist and anarchoprimitivist author

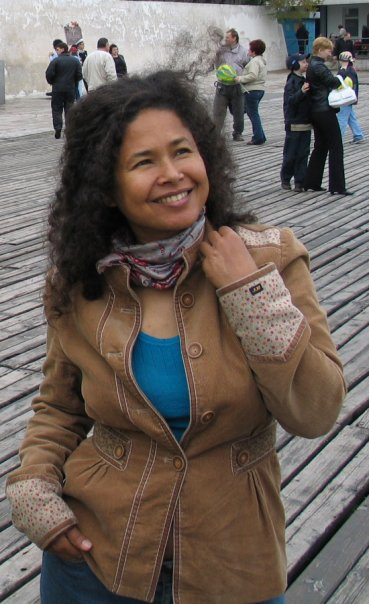
- AbdelRahim in Sevastopol in May 2006
- Born: Moscow, Russian SFSR, Soviet Union
- Education: Bryn Mawr College (AB); Stockholm University (Master's); Université de Montréal (PhD)
- Occupations: Comparatist anthropologist; author

Layla AbdelRahim is a comparatist anthropologist and anarchoprimitivist author, whose works on narratives of civilization and wilderness have contributed to the fields of anthropology, literary and cultural studies, comparative literature, philosophy, animal studies, ecophilosophy, sociology, anarcho-primitivist thought, anarchism, epistemology, and critique of civilization, technology, and education. She attributes the collapse in the diversity of bio-systems and environmental degradation to monoculturalism and the civilised ontology that explains existence in terms of anthropocentric utilitarian functions.

Her books Children's Literature, Domestication, and Social Foundation: Narratives of Civilization and Wilderness (Routledge 2015) and Wild Children – Domesticated Dreams: Civilization and the Birth of Education (Fernwood 2013) make a contribution to children's literary theory and a critique of education as rooted in the civilised need for the domestication of children.

== Education ==
AbdelRahim received her A.B. from Bryn Mawr College and, upon graduation in 1993, received the Thomas J. Watson Fellowship to pursue an anthropological project in Europe. She did graduate work in 1993–94 at the School for Advanced Studies in the Social Sciences (École des hautes études en sciences sociales) or l'EHESS and master studies in social sciences at Stockholm University where she later worked as Visiting Researcher at the department of social anthropology. She completed her Ph.D. at the Université de Montréal, Department of Comparative Literature. Her dissertation entitled Order and the Literary Rendering of Chaos: Children's Literature as Knowledge, Culture, and Social Foundation, examines the effect of ontological premises on human self-knowledge (anthropology) and the repercussions of such knowledge on the anthropogenic destruction of the world's life systems and diversity.

== Thought ==
AbdelRahim traces the root of all oppression to the ontological premises of domestication that define the raison d'être of living and non-living beings in terms of consumption and co-existence in a hierarchy of food chain. Drawing on paleontological studies, ethology, and biological anthropology, she challenges the precepts in the narrative of anthropology that constructs the human as predator and consumer. This critique extends to civilized economic and socio-political cultures and their effect on the environment as well as on systems of education and parenting. Her examination of civilized and wild narratives is relevant to a variety of domains and disciplines, such as philosophy of science, evolutionary theory, anthropology, sociology, cultural studies, environmental economics, education, literary theory.

== Media appearances ==
AbdelRahim is featured in anOther Story of Progress, a documentary film by Thomas Toivonen, as one of the world's leading contemporary anarcho-primitivist philosophers.

== Selected works ==
=== Books ===
- AbdelRahim, Layla (2015). Children's Literature, Domestication, and Social Foundation: Narratives of Civilization and Wilderness. New York: Routledge. ISBN 978-0-415-66110-2.
- Wild Children – Domesticated Dreams: Civilization and the Birth of Education. Halifax: Fernwood. 2013. ISBN 978-1-552-66548-0.

=== Articles ===
- AbdelRahim, Layla (May 2008). "Beyond the Symbolic and towards the Collapse". The Anarchist Library.
- AbdelRahim, Layla (June 2009). "On Objects, Love, and Objectifications". The Paulinian Compass.
- AbdelRahim, Layla (November 2009). "The Nature of Mind Destruction". The Paulinian Compass.
- AbdelRahim, Layla (December 2009). "Avatar: An Anarcho-Primitivist Picture of the History of the World". The Anarchist Library.
- AbdelRahim, Layla (July 2010). "Genealogies of Wilderness and Domestication in Children's Narratives: Understanding Genesis and Genetics in the Untangling of Identity". The Paulinian Compass.
- AbdelRahim, Layla (May 2014). "Education as the Domestication of Inner Space". Fifth Estate (391).
