= Frank Wolf (academic) =

American political scientist and academic administrator

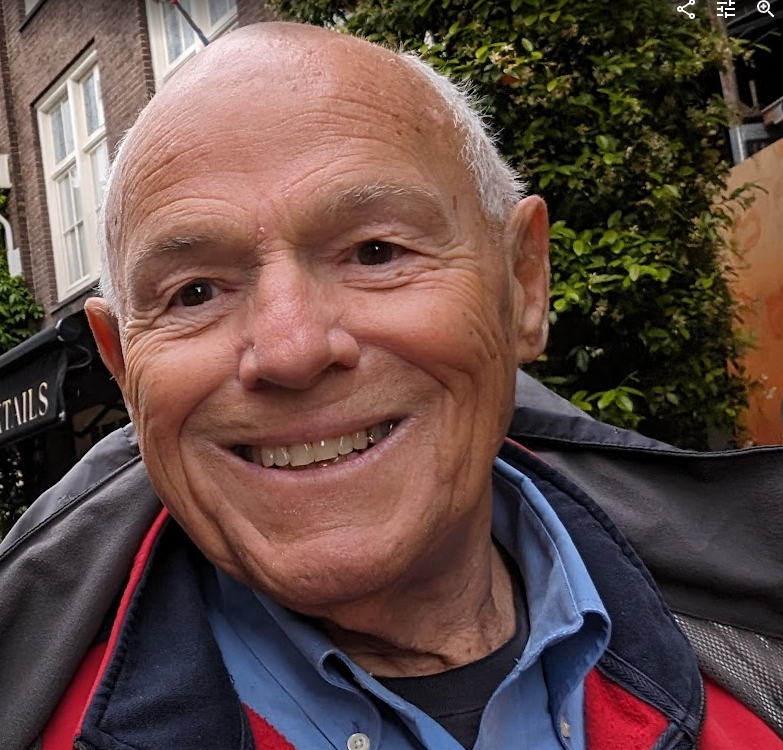
Frank Wolf

Frank Wolf is an American political scientist, academic, and higher education administrator. He is Dean Emeritus of Columbia University's School of Professional Studies (formerly the School of Continuing Education) and previously served as associate dean and acting dean of the Columbia University School of General Studies. Earlier in his career he was a member of the political science faculty at Drew University and directed several study abroad and experiential learning programs. He has also served as a trustee of Saltaire, New York, and as a board member of the nonprofit organization Urban Pathways.

== Academic career ==
Wolf began his academic career in political science at Drew University in Madison, New Jersey, where he was a member of the political science faculty. He taught courses in American politics and political communication and participated in interdisciplinary faculty seminars supported by the university's Aquinas Fund. In the early 1970s Wolf served as resident director and academic director of Drew University's study programs in the United Kingdom. Wolf published a piece about newspaper coverage of U.S. presidential campaigns in The American Political Science Review in 1979.

== Columbia University ==
Wolf joined Columbia University's School of General Studies in 1979 as associate dean. He also provided academic oversight for Columbia's administration of Reid Hall in Paris from 1979 to 2006. Following the death of Dean Ward H. Dennis in October 1992, Wolf became acting dean of the School of General Studies. After incoming president George Rupp took office in July 1993, he appointed historian Caroline Walker Bynum as the new permanent dean.

In 1994 Columbia reorganized its non-degree programs, creating what eventually became the School of Continuing Education, with Wolf as its founding dean. That school later was renamed School of Professional Studies. Wolf became dean of the School of Continuing Education and Special Programs, overseeing certificate programs, postbaccalaureate study, summer sessions, and other non-degree programs for adult, part-time, and professional students. In 2003, Wolf chaired Columbia's Web Advisory Committee and helped oversee a redesign of the university's homepage.

Wolf is Dean Emeritus of what is now the School of Professional Studies. In 2022 he was vice president of the retired faculty association, EPIC (Emeritus Professors in Columbia). Since 2024 he has served as president of the association.

== Jeanette K. Watson Fellowship ==
After his deanship at Columbia, Wolf became director of the Jeanette K. Watson Fellowship, a New York City–based program that provides undergraduates with three-year sequences of paid internships, mentoring, and professional development. In this role he worked with partner colleges and universities to select fellows, design internship placements in the public, private, and nonprofit sectors, and support students' academic and professional growth.

== Volunteer work ==
Wolf has served as a trustee of the Village of Saltaire, New York, where he has participated in local government and community planning. Wolf was elected to the board of trustees in 2012, receiving 131 votes; he had previously served on the board from 2000 to 2002 and has also served on the village's planning board and zoning board of appeals. In 2018 Wolf was re-elected to his fifth term as trustee. He has also been a member of the board of Urban Pathways, a New York City–based nonprofit that provides housing and supportive services to people experiencing homelessness.

== Selected works ==
- Wolf, Frank. Television Programming for News and Public Affairs: A Quantitative Analysis of Networks and Stations. New York: Praeger Publishers, 1972. 203 pp. The book was reviewed in Journal of Broadcasting, Vol. 18, No. 3 (1974), pp. 368–377.
- "Newspaper Coverage of the 1976 and 1968 Presidential Campaigns", Journalism Quarterly (with co-author John M. Russonello).
