= Chris Kasabach =

- Education: Harvard Kennedy School, Carnegie Mellon
- Occupations: Designer, Entrepreneur, Foundation Director

Chris Kasabach has served the Executive Director of the Watson Foundation since 2011, and is a member of the Foundation's board. He previously co-founded Sandbox Advanced Development with three Carnegie Mellon alumni, and together they co-founded and grew the company into BodyMedia Inc., a wearable health technology pioneer that was acquired by Jawbone for $100 million in 2013. He also currently serves on the board of directors at the Winterhouse Institute, a council of national design education. Previously, he received his BFA from Carnegie Mellon and an MPA from the Harvard Kennedy School, where he was named Lucius N. Littauer Fellow.

== Design Awards ==
Chris Kasabach's work has won several design awards, including two International Design Excellence Awards. His work has been exhibited by the Cooper Hewitt Smithsonian Design Museum. He was also a recipient of the Watson Fellowship in 1991, from the foundation he would later direct.
