= Francisco Valero-Cuevas =

Mexican engineer

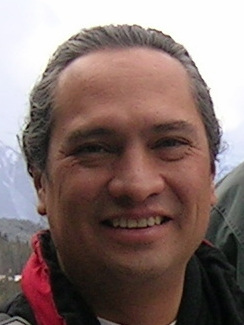
- Born: 1964 (age 61–62)
- Education: Stanford University, Queen's University, Swarthmore College
- Known for: Motor control, biomechanics
- Scientific career
- Fields: Biomedical engineering, mechanical engineering, biokinesiology, physical therapy
- Workplaces: University of Southern California, Cornell University, Stanford University
- Thesis: Identification of Biomechanical Factors Limiting Finger Force Production (1997)
- Doctoral advisor: Felix Zajac

Francisco Javier Valero-Cuevas (born 1964) is an engineer of Mexican origin, and a Professor of Biomedical Engineering, Biokinesiology and Physical Therapy, Aerospace and Mechanical Engineering, Computer Science, and Electrical Engineering at the University of Southern California. He is known for his work on how the human hand works, and its clinical applications. He is notable for several inventions, including devices for measuring hand function and leg function, and the construction of archways in civil engineering. Among his scholarly contributions is a textbook on the mathematical foundations underlying the study of motor control and biomechanics. He is an Elected Fellow of the American Institute for Medical and Biological Engineering (2014), an Elected Senior Member of the Institute of Electrical and Electronics Engineers, and a Thomas J. Watson Fellow.

== Education ==
Francisco Valero-Cuevas graduated from Swarthmore College in 1988 with a BS in Engineering. As a Thomas J. Watson Fellow, he spent one year in the Indian Subcontinent, studying philosophy and learning Hindi. In 1991, he received an MS in Mechanical Engineering from Queen's University, under the guidance of Professor Carolyn Small. He joined Stanford University in the Department of Mechanical Engineering and obtained a PhD in 1997, under the guidance of Professor Felix Zajac.

== Career ==
Valero-Cuevas' first job was as a research associate and lecturer at Stanford University in Mechanical Engineering. He then joined Cornell University's Sibley School of Mechanical and Aerospace Engineering as an assistant professor, with a joint appointment at the Hospital for Special Surgery as an assistant scientist. After being promoted to associate professor (with tenure) in 2005, he moved to the University of Southern California as an associate professor (with tenure), and was promoted to full professor in 2011. His primary appointment at the University of Southern California are in the Department of Biomedical Engineering and the Division of Biokinesiology and Physical Therapy. He has joint appointments in the Department of Aerospace and Mechanical Engineering and the Department of Computer Science.

== Notable contributions ==
=== Strength-dexterity test ===
This method for the assessment of hand function was invented by Francisco Valero-Cuevas in 2000, and available as a device. He has applied this successfully to study hand function in adults with disabilities, children, and even for assessing leg function. He founded a company in 2015, Neuromuscular Dynamics, LLC, based on these devices.

== Awards and honors ==
- 2023 Elected senior member, National Academy of Inventors for innovation in the field of human mobility.
- 2018 Honorary degree of Doctor of Sciences, awarded by his Alma mater, Swarthmore College during their 146th Commencement on may 27, 2018
- 2015 Orange County Engineering Council OCEC President’s Prestigious Award, for "Scholarly and Outstanding Contributions to the Engineering Profession'"
- 2014 Elected Fellow, College of Fellows of the American Institute for Medical and Biological Engineering for "Outstanding Contributions to the Mathematical and Engineering Understanding of the Neural Control of Limbs to Produce Versatile Function"
- 2013 Outstanding Technical Achievement Award from the 25th Conference Hispanic Engineer National Achievement Awards Corporation (HENAAC), Great Minds in STEM
- 2013 Elected Senior Member of the Institute of Electrical and Electronics Engineers
- 2002 American Society of Biomechanics' Post-doctoral Young Scientist Award
- 2001 Whitaker Foundation
- 1988 Thomas J. Watson Fellowship to study Sankhya Yoga Philosophy in India and Nepal
