= Philippe Rochat (psychologist) =

American developmental psychologist

- Occupation: Professor of Psychology
- Awards: Guggenheim Fellowship

Academic background
- Education: University of Geneva, Switzerland

Academic work
- Institutions: Emory University

Philippe Rochat (born 1950) is a developmental psychologist known for his research on social cognition, development of a sense of self, and moral development in infancy and early childhood. He holds the position of Professor of Psychology and Director of the Infant and Child Lab at Emory University.

Rochat was a John Simon Guggenheim fellow from 2006-2007. From 2014-2015 he was a Fellow at the Institut D'etudes Avancées de Paris during which his research focused on the topic of lying and confession. Rochat has served on the advisory board of the Center for Subjectivity Research at the University of Copenhagen.

== Biography ==
Philippe Rochat was born in Geneva, Switzerland. His wife, Rana Rochat, is an artist.

Rochat received his PhD from the University of Geneva in 1983, where he was mentored by Swiss psychologist Jean Piaget and his collaborators.

After the completion of his doctorate, Rochat went on to hold postdoctoral internships at Brown University, University of Pennsylvania, and Johns Hopkins University. He was a member of the Faculty of Psychology at University of Massachusetts, Amherst from 1987 until 1991 when he moved to Emory University. His research on infant self-awareness has been funded by the National Science Foundation.

== Research ==
Rochat's research interests span topics of self-awareness, social cognition, and moral development across cultures in infants as early as six weeks old and young children. His work highlights how conceptions of self develop early in life, demonstrating that infants are born with some degree of self-awareness and can differentiate themselves from their environments as early as six weeks old. Rochat argues that self-consciousness about how one is perceived is elicited as young as two and three years old when their self-perceptions confront the realization that others may view them differently. This, he proposes, is at the core of what makes humans different from other species.

== Books ==
- Rochat, P. (2001). The infant's world. Harvard University Press. Foreign translations: French (Odile Jacob, 2006), Spanish (Madrid), Danish (Copenhagen), Japanese (Minerva Press, 2004), Chinese (East China Normal University Press, 2006).
- Rochat, P. (2009). Others in mind; social origins of self-consciousness. Cambridge University Press.
- Rochat, P. (2014). Origins of possession: Owning and sharing in development. Cambridge University Press.
- Rochat, P. (2021). Moral acrobatics: How we avoid ethical ambiguities by thinking in black and white. Oxford University Press.
- Rochat, P. (2022). Finitude: The Psychology of Self and Time. Routledge Press.

== Representative publications ==
- Rochat, P. (2003). Five levels of self-awareness as they unfold early in life. Consciousness and Cognition: An International Journal, 12(4), 717–731.
- Rochat, P., Dias, M.D.G., Guo, L. Broesch, T., Passos-Ferreira, C., Winning, A. Berg, B. (2009). Fairness in distributive justice by 3-and 5-year-olds across 7 cultures. Journal of Cross-Cultural Psychology, 40(3), 416-442.
- Rochat, P., & Hespos, S. J. (1997). Differential rooting response by neonates: Evidence for an early sense of self. Early Development & Parenting, 6, 105–112.
