= Colin Espie =

Scottish professor

Colin Espie (born 1957) is a Scottish Professor of Sleep Medicine in the Nuffield Department of Clinical Neuroscience at the University of Oxford and Fellow of Somerville College. He is closely involved with the development of the Sir Jules Thorn Sleep & Circadian Neuroscience Institute (SCNi) where he is Founding Director of the Experimental & Clinical Sleep Medicine Research programme, and Clinical Director of the Oxford Online Programme in Sleep Medicine. His particular areas of research expertise are in the assessment and treatment of sleep disorders, most particularly the management of insomnia using cognitive behavioral therapy, and in studies on the aetiology and pathophysiology of insomnia.

== Biography ==
Colin Espie was educated at Hutchesons' Grammar School (leaving in 1974), and subsequently completed a BSc (Psychology, 1978) and an MAppSci (Clinical Psychology, 1980) at the University of Glasgow. In 1980 he commenced practice in NHS Lanarkshire's mental health services, where he first encountered insomnia as a common complaint. This led to his PhD (1987) in sleep disorders and his career-long interest in the assessment and management of Insomnia Disorder. Espie has held many senior clinical and academic positions, including as a Clinical Director in NHS Ayrshire & Arran (1988-1995) and Professor of Clinical Psychology at the University of Glasgow (1995-2012) where he also founded the UoG Sleep Centre. Whilst in Glasgow he developed the research portfolio model for the Doctor of Clinical Psychology (DClinPsy) that became adopted by clinical training courses across the UK. Espie joined the Nuffield Department of Clinical Neuroscience, University of Oxford in 2013, the year in which he was also awarded a DSc in respect of his contributions to sleep science and practice. His work at Oxford has established a lasting legacy of sleep research and sleep medicine training. He was the Founding Director of the 'Better Sleep' programme in the NIHR Oxford Health Biomedical Research Centre. He has held adjunct or visiting professorial appointments at the University of Sydney, University of Rome (la Sapienza), Universite Laval (Quebec City) and University of Rochester (NY).

== Other appointments and contributions ==
Espie has served on the boards of European Sleep Research Society, World Sleep Society, Journal of Sleep Research, and Sleep Medicine Reviews). He was appointed an Honorary Fellow of the BABCP (British Association for Behavioural & Cognitive Psychotherapies) in 2015, was awarded the Mary A. Carskadon Outstanding Educator Award by the Sleep Research Society in 2017, and the Peter Hauri Career Distinguished Achievement Award by the Society of Behavioral Sleep Medicine in 2021. Espie is an Emeritus Professor in the College of Medical, Veterinary and Life Sciences at the University of Glasgow. In 2010, Espie co-founded the digital therapeutics company Big Health, with entrepreneur Peter Hames. The first programme, Sleepio is a fully automated digital CBT for insomnia program, launched in 2010 to make evidence-based digital CBT (dCBT or 'digital medicine') accessible at population scale. The Sleepio programme has been validated in 16 pre-registered randomised controlled trials (RCTs) and received a UK NICE Guideline in May 2022, and in the US, FDA clearance for SleepioRx was issued in 2024. Espie also makes regular contributions to print, radio, TV and podcast media on what sleep is, why it matters, how to manage sleep, sleep and mental health, as well as mental health service design.

== Selected publications ==
=== Books ===
- Espie, C.A. (2021) Overcoming Insomnia: A Self-Help Guide Using Cognitive Behavioural Techniques, 2nd edition. Little, Brown Book Group, London. ISBN 978-1-4721-4141-5
- Baglioni, C., Espie, C.A., & Riemann D. (2022) Cognitive Behavioural Therapy for Insomnia across the Lifespan: Guidelines and Clinical Protocols for Health Professionals. Wiley & Sons, London, and New York. ISBN 978-1-119-78513-2
- Espie, C.A. (2025) The Clinician’s Guide to Cognitive and Behavioural Therapeutics (CBTx) for Insomnia: a Scientist-Practitioner Approach. Cambridge University Press, UK. ISBN 978-1-108-98948-0
- Espie, C.A., Zee, P., & Morin, C.M. (2025) The Oxford Handbook of Sleep and Sleep Disorders (Oxford Library of Psychology) 2nd edition. Oxford University Press, USA. ISBN 978-0-19-760275-1
