= Force matching =

Research method

Force matching is a research method consisting of test subjects attempting to produce a set forces that are equal to a set of more reliable reference forces.

== Types ==
=== Biomechanical ===
A subject’s maximum voluntary contraction (MVC) is recorded and used to normalize both reference forces and results between subjects. During the test subjects are assisted in producing a reference force using various types of feedback (static weight or visual display of force generated). This is followed by an attempt of the subject to generate the reference force without assistance. The duration for both reference and matching tasks is usually four seconds. Results are taken as a mean value of force generated over a time interval set by the researcher. Time intervals are generally one second long and near the end of the attempt. Reference forces are typically set as a percentage of a subject’s MVC while error is typically reported as a percentage of a subject’s MVC.

=== Atomic ===
It is one of the effective research method to obtain realistic classical interatomic potential or force field for molecular dynamics simulation with high degree of transferability for systems which the first principles or ab initio method is capable of treating. This method is based on fitting the forces on individual atoms in a number of reference structures, cohesive energies and stresses on unit cell obtained from first principles calculation with those obtained from classical interatomic potential. The target of the computational fitting is to determine unknown coefficients in classical interatomic potential function. This method is developed by F. Ercolessi, and J. B. Adams during 1992 and 1993 at Department of Material Science and Engineering at the University of Illinois Urbana-Champaign. The enormous number of reference structures, which can reach several thousand values, makes it possible to fit large number of parameters needed for potential in binary and ternary systems. For Lennard-Jones potential:

$$V_\text{LJ} = 4\varepsilon \left[ \left(\frac{\sigma}{r}\right)^{12} - \left(\frac{\sigma}{r}\right)^6 \right],$$

where ε is the depth of the potential well, σ is the finite distance at which the inter-particle potential is zero, r is the distance between the particles. These two unknown parameters can be fitted to reproduce experimental data or accurate data obtained from first principle calculations. Differentiating the L-J potential with respect to r gives an expression for the net inter-molecular force between 2 molecules. This inter-molecular force may be attractive or repulsive, depending on the value of r. When r is very small, the molecules repel each other. In force matching method the forces from classical potential

$F_\text{LJ} =- \frac{dV_\text{LJ}}{dr} =4\varepsilon \left[\left(\frac{12}{r}\right) \left(\frac{\sigma}{r}\right)^{12} - \left(\frac{6}{r}\right)\left(\frac{\sigma}{r}\right)^6 \right]$ are compared with reference force $F^0$ calculated from ab initio method to determine ${\sigma}$ and ${\varepsilon}$.

== Applications ==
Biomechanical force matching has been used by researchers to describe the accuracy of muscle contractions under various conditions. It has been observed that the thumb is more accurate in force matching than fingers are. Impairment of the extensor pollicis longus has not produced a decrease in force matching accuracy of the flexor pollicis longus.
