= Box and Block Test =

- Synonyms: BBT
- Purpose: manual dexterity measure

In rehabilitation medicine, the Box and Block Test is a functional test used in upper limb rehabilitation. While often referred to as the Box and Blocks test, the original article refers to the test as the Box and Block Test. The test is used to measure the gross manual dexterity of a patient or a person using an upper limb prosthetic device.

The test consists of a box with a partition in the middle. The box is placed on the table with blocks placed on one side of the partition. The test subject is given 60 seconds to move as many blocks as possible from one side of the partition to the other, using only the tested hand (the subject's own hand or a prosthetic device operated by the subject). The number of displaced blocks is a measure of the gross manual dexterity, where a higher number of displaced blocks indicates better fine motor skill. The outcome can be compared to reference values from healthy test subjects or from tests performed with a prosthesis, enabling the measurement of progression of gross hand dexterity during rehabilitation.
