= Herbert V. Prochnow =

American businessman (1897–1998)

Herbert Victor Prochnow (May 19, 1897 – September 29, 1998) was a U.S. banking executive, noted toastmaster, and writer during the middle 20th century.

As Vice President of the First National Bank of Chicago, Prochnow wrote several popular books on public speaking. He also wrote epigrams and anecdotes that appeared in The Saturday Evening Post and Reader's Digest. In the 1930s, he rose in the foreign—later international—department at First National Bank.

In the mid-1940s, Prochnow was a member of the Office of Strategic Services, recruiting and training American spies for an organization viewed as a predecessor of the CIA. A decade later, U.S. Secretary of State John Foster Dulles asked Prochnow to come to Washington to serve as deputy undersecretary of state for economic affairs, a position he held for two years.

He also served as secretary of the Federal Advisory Council of the Federal Reserve System for more than 40 years.

== Quotable quotes by Prochnow ==
- "A visitor from Mars could easily pick out the civilized nations. They have the best implements of war."
- "The trouble with opportunity is that it always comes disguised as hard work."
- "'Company policy' means there's no understandable reason for this action."
- "A great many people mistake opinions for thoughts."
- "The fellow who never makes a mistake takes his orders from one who does."

== Books by Prochnow ==
- The Public Speaker's Treasure Chest: A Compendium of Source Material to Make Your Speech Sparkle (Harper & Brothers, 1942)
- Meditations of the Ten Commandments (W.A. Wilde, 1946)
- The Toastmaster's Handbook (Prentice Hall, May 1949)
- The Successful Speaker's Handbook (Prentice Hall, May 1951)
- The Speaker's Treasury of Stories for All Occasions (Prentice Hall, June 1953)
- The Toastmaster's and Speaker's Handbook (October 1955, Cardinal edition in paperback December 1955)
- Meditations on the Beatitudes (1952)
- Speaker's Handbook of Epigrams and Witticisms (1955)
- A Dictionary of Wit, Wisdom, and Satire (POPULAR LIBRARY EDITION March 1964)
