= Gbowee Peace Foundation Africa =

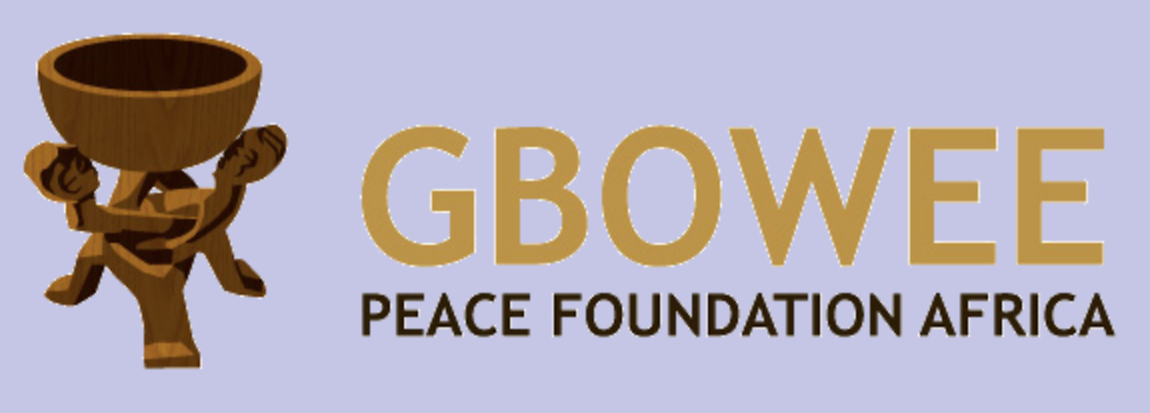
- Formation: 2012
- Founder: Leymah Gbowee
- Founded at: Monrovia, Liberia
- Type: Nonprofit organization
- Legal status: Registered non-profit
- Headquarters: Monrovia, Liberia
- Region served: Liberia, West Africa
- President: Leymah Gbowee
- Main organ: Board of Directors
- Website: https://gboweepeaceafrica.org/

Gbowee Peace Foundation Africa (GPFA) is a non-profit organisation based in Monrovia, Liberia, founded in 2012 by Leymah Gbowee, Nobel Peace Prize laureate. The foundation works to expand access to education, leadership opportunities, and empowerment programmes for women and youth in Liberia and across West Africa, with the goal of building sustainable peace and civic participation.

== History ==
The foundation was established in 2012 following Gbowee’s international recognition as a peace activist and co-recipient of the 2011 Nobel Peace Prize. It was created to channel resources toward grassroots education and leadership programmes after the Liberian civil war.

== Activities and programmes ==
GPFA runs initiatives in education, leadership, and community resilience:

- Education and scholarships: The foundation has awarded scholarships for secondary and tertiary education in Liberia and West Africa. Independent reports show its scholarship fund targets vulnerable youth, especially girls, who are often excluded from formal education systems.
- Leadership and peace training: GPFA organises workshops on civic participation and women’s leadership, and its representatives, including Gbowee, have spoken at major global forums on youth and women in peacebuilding.
- Community resilience and recovery: The organisation distributed food and non-food supplies to communities during Liberia’s Ebola outbreak and later in pandemic-related crises.

== Governance and affiliations ==
Leymah Gbowee serves as founder and president. GPFA is supported by a registered U.S.-based affiliate, Gbowee Peace Foundation Africa-USA, which coordinates fundraising and advocacy.

== Funding and recognition ==
The foundation receives funding from philanthropic partners, private donors, and international development groups. Its collaborations include work with the African Women’s Development Fund and other NGOs. International media and institutions have recognised GPFA for advancing gender equality and peacebuilding in Liberia.

== Reception and impact ==
Rotary International, Article 3, and other independent outlets highlight GPFA’s grassroots peacebuilding and scholarship work as part of broader post-war reconstruction in Liberia. The African Women’s Development Fund lists GPFA as a partner organisation in its West Africa programme.

== See also ==
- Leymah Gbowee
- Women of Liberia Mass Action for Peace
