= List of Columbia University people =

This is a partially sorted list of notable persons who have had ties to Columbia University. For further listing of notable Columbians, see alumni lists at Columbia College of Columbia University; Columbia University School of General Studies; Columbia Law School; Columbia Business School; Columbia University Graduate School of Journalism; Columbia University Graduate School of Architecture, Planning and Preservation; Columbia University College of Physicians and Surgeons; Columbia University Graduate School of Education (Teachers College); Fu Foundation School of Engineering and Applied Science; Columbia Graduate School of Arts and Sciences; Columbia University School of Professional Studies; Columbia University School of the Arts; the School of International and Public Affairs; and Barnard College. The following lists are incomplete.

== Nobel laureates ==
As of the 2025 awards, 104 Nobel laureates have been affiliated with Columbia University as alumni or faculty. Among the 104 laureates, 72 are Nobel laureates in natural sciences; (Note: The total number of laureates in natural sciences: Physics, Chemistry, and Physiology or Medicine.) 46 are Columbia alumni (graduates and attendees) and 34 have been long-term academic members of the Columbia faculty; and subject-wise, 33 laureates have won the Nobel Prize in Physics, more than any other subject. This list considers Nobel laureates as equal individuals and does not consider their various prize shares or if they received the prize more than once. It includes alumni and faculty of Barnard College after 1900 and those of Bard College by 1944, as well as physicians and long-term medical staff of the Mary Imogene Bassett Hospital.

In the following list, the number following a person's name is the year they received the prize; in particular, a number with asterisk (*) means the person received the award while they were working at Columbia University (including emeritus staff). A name marked with a dagger (^{†}) indicates that this person has already been listed in a previous category (i.e., multiple affiliations).

Summary of Columbia University's Nobel Laureates
Category	Alumni	Professors of various ranks	Researchers or visitors
Total: 104	46	34	44
Physics (33)	1. Robert Millikan – 1923; 2. Isidor Rabi – 1944; 3. Julian Schwinger – 1965; 4. Leon Cooper – 1972; 5. James Rainwater – 1975; 6. Arno Penzias – 1978; 7. Val Fitch – 1980; 8. Leon Lederman – 1988; 9. Melvin Schwartz – 1988; 10. Norman Ramsey – 1989; 11. Martin Perl – 1995; 12. Arthur Ashkin – 2018; 13. John Clauser – 2022	1. Enrico Fermi – 1938; 2. Isidor Rabi^{†} – 1944*; 3. Hideki Yukawa – 1949*; 4. Willis Lamb – 1955; 5. Polykarp Kusch – 1955*; 6. Tsung-Dao Lee – 1957*; 7. Charles Townes – 1964; 8. James Rainwater^{†} – 1975*; 9. Samuel Ting – 1976; 10. Melvin Schwartz^{†} – 1988; 11. Leon Lederman^{†} – 1988; 12. Jack Steinberger – 1988; 13. Norman Ramsey^{†} – 1989; 14. Horst Störmer – 1998*	1. Emilio Segrè – 1959; 2. Maria Mayer – 1963; 3. Hans Bethe – 1967; 4. Murray Gell-Mann – 1969; 5. Aage Bohr – 1975; 6. Samuel Ting^{†} – 1976; 7. Steven Weinberg – 1979; 8. Arthur Schawlow – 1981; 9. Carlo Rubbia – 1984; 10. Leon Lederman^{†} – 1988; 11. Daniel Tsui – 1998; 12. John C. Mather – 2006; 13. Giorgio Parisi – 2021
Chemistry (16)	1. Irving Langmuir – 1932; 2. John H. Northrop – 1946; 3. William H. Stein – 1972; 4. Roald Hoffmann – 1981; 5. Herbert Hauptman – 1985; 6. Sidney Altman – 1989; 7. William S. Knowles – 2001; 8. Robert Grubbs – 2005; 9. Robert Lefkowitz – 2012; 10. Louis E. Brus – 2023	1. Harold Urey – 1934*; 2. Martin Chalfie – 2008*; 3. Martin Karplus – 2013; 4. Joachim Frank – 2017*; 5. Louis E. Brus^{†} – 2023*	1. Willard Libby – 1960; 2. Luis Leloir – 1970
Physiology or Medicine (23)	1. Hermann J. Muller – 1946; 2. Edward C. Kendall – 1950; 3. Dickinson Richards – 1956; 4. Joshua Lederberg – 1958; 5. Konrad Bloch – 1964; 6. George Wald – 1967; 7. Konrad Lorenz – 1973; 8. Baruch Blumberg – 1976; 9. Baruj Benacerraf – 1980; 10. Harold Varmus – 1989; 11. Louis Ignarro – 1998; 12. Richard Axel – 2004	1. Thomas H. Morgan – 1933; 2. André Cournand – 1956*; 3. Dickinson Richards^{†} – 1956*; 4. Eric Kandel – 2000*; 5. Richard Axel^{†} – 2004*; 6. James Rothman – 2013	1. Hermann J. Muller^{†} – 1946; 2. Joshua Lederberg^{†} – 1958; 3. Konrad Bloch^{†} – 1964; 4. Salvador Luria – 1969; 5. Baruch Blumberg^{†} – 1976; 6. Carleton Gajdusek – 1976; 7. Daniel Nathans – 1978; 8. Baruj Benacerraf^{†} – 1980; 9. Sune Bergström – 1982; 10. Donnall Thomas – 1990; 11. Linda Buck – 2004; 12. David Julius – 2021
Economics (17)	1. Simon Kuznets – 1971; 2. Kenneth Arrow – 1972; 3. Milton Friedman – 1976; 4. Robert Fogel – 1993; 5. William Vickrey – 1996; 6. Robert C. Merton – 1997; 7. Alvin Roth – 2012	1. George Stigler – 1982; 2. Gary Becker – 1992; 3. William Vickrey^{†} – 1996*; 4. Robert Mundell – 1999*; 5. James Heckman – 2000; 6. Joseph Stiglitz – 2001*; 7. Edmund Phelps – 2006*	1. Milton Friedman^{†} – 1976; 2. Franco Modigliani – 1985; 3. Robert Solow – 1987; 4. Joseph Stiglitz^{†} – 2001; 5. David Card – 2021; 6. Joshua Angrist – 2021
Literature (7)	1. Louise Glück – 2020	1. Orhan Pamuk – 2006	1. Gabriela Mistral – 1945; 2. Joseph Brodsky – 1987; 3. Nadine Gordimer – 1991; 4. Derek Walcott – 1992; 5. Orhan Pamuk^{†} – 2006; 6. László Krasznahorkai – 2025
Peace (8)	1. Theodore Roosevelt – 1906; 2. Nicholas Butler – 1931; 3. Barack Obama – 2009	1. Nicholas Butler^{†} – 1931	1. Elie Wiesel – 1986; 2. Al Gore – 2007; 3. Liu Xiaobo – 2010; 4. Leymah Gbowee – 2011; 5. Maria Ressa – 2021

== Fields Medalists ==
- Jesse Douglas (attended Columbia College 1920–1924)—one of two winners of the first Fields Medal in 1936
- Heisuke Hironaka—former professor of mathematics, Columbia; winner of the Fields Medal in 1970
- Shigefumi Mori—former professor of mathematics, Columbia; winner of the Fields Medal and the Cole Prize (both in 1990)
- Andrei Okounkov—former professor of mathematics, Columbia; winner of the Fields Medal in 2006
- Stephen Smale—former professor of mathematics, Columbia; winner of the Fields Medal in 1966 and the Wolf Prize in Mathematics in 2006/7, one of only twelve Fields Medallists to win both prizes

== Wolf Prize ==
- Robert Brout (Ph.D.)—Belgian theoretical physicist; 2004 Wolf Prize in Physics; 2010 Sakurai Prize; significant contributions in elementary particle physics
- John Clauser (M.A. 1966, Ph.D. 1969)—theoretical and experimental physicist; 2010 Wolf Prize in Physics; Clauser-Horne-Shimony-Holt inequality
- Samuel J. Danishefsky (postdoctoral fellowship)—1995 Wolf Prize in Chemistry; Danishefsky's diene, Danishefsky Taxol total synthesis
- Samuel Eilenberg—1986 Wolf Prize in Mathematics; Eilenberg–Steenrod axioms, Eilenberg swindle
- Peter Eisenmann (M.A.)—architect; 2010 Wolf Prize in Arts; work often referred to as formalist, deconstructive, late avant-garde
- Harry B. Gray—2004 Wolf Prize in Chemistry
- Leon M. Lederman (Ph.D.)—experimental physicist, Wolf Prize in Physics, National Medal of Science, Presidential Medal of Freedom
- Karl Maramorosch (Ph.D. 1949)—virologist, entomologist and plant pathologist; 1980 Wolf Prize in Agriculture
- Stephen Smale—2006 Wolf Prize in Mathematics; National Medal of Science (1975); Bonner Prize (1975); Comstock Prize in Physics (1964)
- Gilbert Stork—1995 Wolf Prize in Chemistry; 1982 National Medal of Science, Willard Gibbs Medal
- Chien-Shiung Wu—physics professor and particle physicist, first woman to head the American Physical Society and first woman to become a tenured professor in the physics department; 1978 Wolf Prize in Physics

== Crafoord Prize ==
- Wallace Smith Broecker (alumnus and faculty)—Crafoord Prize in Geoscience (2006), Balzan Prize, National Medal of Science, Vetlesen Prize
- Peter K. Gregersen (MD 1976)—Crafoord Prize in Polyarthritis (2013)
- Richard Lewontin (MA, Ph.D. 1954)—Crafoord Prize in Bioscience (2015)
- Peter Molnar (Ph.D. 1970 Geology) Crafoord Prize in Geosciences (2014)
- Walter Munk (undergrad attendee)—Crafoord Prize in Geoscience (2010); National Medal of Science, Vetlesen Prize, Kyoto Prize

== Templeton Prize ==
- Francisco J. Ayala (Ph.D. 1964)—Templeton Prize for life's work in evolutionary biology and genetics (2010), National Medal of Science (2001)

== ACM Turing Award ==
- Alfred Aho (faculty, 1995–present)—professor of computer science; John von Neumann Medal (2003); ACM Turing Award (2020)
- John Backus (B.S. 1949, M.A. 1950 Mathematics)—inventor of Fortran programming language, Draper Prize
- Jeffrey Ullman (B.S. 1963)—professor of computer science at Stanford University; IEEE John von Neumann Medal (2010); ACM Turing Award (2020)

== Founding Fathers of the United States ==
Founding Fathers of the United States are the political leaders who signed the Declaration of Independence or the United States Constitution, or otherwise participated in the American Revolution as leaders of the Patriots.

- Egbert Benson—Founding Father, member of the Continental Congresses; with Alexander Hamilton, delegate from New York to the Annapolis Convention; ratifier of the United States Constitution; served in the First and Second United States Congresses
- Alexander Hamilton—Founding Father, American Revolutionary War officer and aide-de-camp to George Washington, initiator and co-author of The Federalist Papers, the first U.S. secretary of the treasury, economist, one of the first U.S. constitutional lawyers (picture appears on U.S. ten-dollar bill)
- John Jay—Founding Father, president of the Continental Congress, co-author of The Federalist Papers, second U.S. secretary of foreign affairs, first chief justice of the United States Supreme Court, diplomat, architect of Jay's Treaty with Great Britain
- Robert Livingston—Founding Father, drafter of the Declaration of Independence, first U.S. secretary of foreign affairs, U.S. minister to France, negotiator of the Louisiana Purchase
- Gouverneur Morris—Founding Father, author of large sections of the Constitution of the United States, U.S. Minister Plenipotentiary to France, United States senator from New York, creator of the Manhattan street grid system, a builder of the Erie canal

== Presidents of the United States ==
- Dwight Eisenhower—34th president of the United States (1953–1961); supreme commander, Allied Expeditionary Force; president of Columbia University
- Barack Obama (B.A. 1983)—44th president of the United States (2009–2017); Nobel Peace Prize recipient; Democratic senator from Illinois (2005–2008); first African-American president of the Harvard Law Review
- Franklin Delano Roosevelt (law, attended 1904–1907; posthumous J.D., class of 1907) —32nd president of the United States (1933–1945); consistently ranked as one of the three greatest U.S. presidents in scholarly surveys; governor of New York; assistant secretary of the Navy
- Theodore Roosevelt (law, attended 1880–1881; posthumous J.D., class of 1882) —26th president of the United States (1901–1909); hero of the Spanish–American War (Medal of Honor, posthumously awarded 2001); Nobel Peace Prize recipient; governor of New York; assistant secretary of the Navy; professional historian, explorer, author

== Vice presidents of the United States ==
- Theodore Roosevelt (Law)—25th vice president of the United States, organized and helped command the Rough Riders in the Spanish–American War, Medal of Honor
- Daniel D. Tompkins—6th vice president of the United States, 4th governor of New York, declined appointment as United States secretary of state by President James Madison

== Presidents and prime ministers (international) ==
- Giuliano Amato (M.A., Law 1963)—twice prime minister of Italy (72nd and 78th PM); minister of the interior; minister of foreign affairs
- Hafizullah Amin (Ph.D. 1962)—2nd general secretary of the People's Democratic Party of Afghanistan and chairman of the Revolutionary Council
- Nahas Angula (M.A., MEd)—prime minister of the Republic of Namibia (incumbent as of 2010); member of the National Assembly since 1990
- Marek Belka—11th prime minister of Poland; twice minister of finance
- Fernando Henrique Cardoso (faculty)—34th president of Brazil (1995–2003); minister of external relations (1992–1993); minister of finance (1993–1994)
- Chen Gongbo (M.A., Economics, 1925)—Chinese politician; president of the Republic of China (Nanjing regime) (1944–1945)
- Włodzimierz Cimoszewicz (Fulbright scholar, research, 1980–1981)—prime minister of Poland (1996–97); minister of Foreign Affairs of Poland (2001–05); speaker, Sejm (lower chamber, Polish parliament) (2005); minister of Justice of the Republic of Poland (1993–95); senator (2007–)
- Gaston Eyskens (MSc 1927)—six-time prime minister of Belgium (1949–1950, 1958–1961, 1968–1973)
- Mark Eyskens (M.A. 1957)—prime minister of Belgium (1981); Belgian minister of oreign affairs (1989–92); Belgian minister of finance; Belgian minister of economic affairs
- Keiko Fujimori (M.B.A) – president of Peru (2026–), leader of Peru's Fujimorist political party, Popular Force (2009–), First Lady of Peru (1994–2000), congresswoman representing the Lima Metropolitan Area (2006–2011), daughter of former president of Peru Alberto Fujimori (1990–2000)
- Ashraf Ghani (M.A. 1977, Ph.D. 1983)—president of Afghanistan; finance minister; chancellor of Kabul University
- Václav Havel (visiting artist-in-residence, 2006)—1st president of the Czech Republic (1993–2003); last president of Czechoslovakia (1989–1992)
- Jose Ramos Horta—Nobel laureate; president of East Timor (2007–2012); prime minister (2006–2007)
- Lee Huan (M.A.)—former premier of the Republic of China (1989–1990); ROC minister of education (1984–1987)
- Toomas Hendrik Ilves (B.A.)—twice president of Estonia (2011–, 2006–11); twice Estonian minister of foreign affairs (1999–2002, 1996–1998); member of the European Parliament (2004–2006)
- Muhammad Fadhel al-Jamali (M.A.)—twice prime minister of Iraq (40th PM); six times foreign minister; member of both houses of Iraqi Parliament
- Radovan Karadžić (M.D. 1975)—Serb politician, 1st president of Republika Srpska (1992–1996), psychiatrist, poet; accused of committing war crimes against Bosnian Muslims and Bosnian Croats during the Siege of Sarajevo, as well as ordering the Srebrenica massacre
- Wellington Koo (B.A., Ph.D.)—twice premier of China (1924; '26–27); interim president ('26–27); ambassador to the U.S. ('46–56); co-founder of League of Nations, United Nations
- Benjamin Mkapa (M.A.)—3rd president of Tanzania (1995–2005); twice minister of foreign affairs and international cooperation (1984–1990, 1977–1980)
- Nwafor Orizu (M.A.)—acting president of Nigeria (1965–1966); second president of the Nigerian Senate (1960–1966) (during the Nigerian First Republic)
- Lucas Papademos (faculty 1975–84)—prime minister of Greece (2011–12); economist; former governor, Bank of Greece (1994–02) and vice president, European Central Bank (2002–10)
- Hans-Gert Pottering (graduate studies)—23rd president of European Parliament (2007–2009)
- Kassim al-Rimawi (M.A. 1954, Ph.D. 1956)—prime minister of Jordan (1980); minister on six occasions (1962–1980)
- Mary Robinson (faculty 2004–)—7th president of Ireland (1990–1997)
- Mikhail Saakashvili (Law 1994)—twice president of Georgia (2004–2007, 2008–present); leader of Rose Revolution
- Juan Bautista Sacasa (M.D.)—66th president of Nicaragua (1933–1936); vice president of Nicaragua (1926–1927)
- Salim Ahmed Salim (M.A.)—5th prime minister of Tanzania; deputy prime minister of Tanzania (1986–89); minister for Foreign Affairs (1980–84); president of the United Nations General Assembly; 6th secretary general, Organization of African Unity
- Ernesto Samper (M.A.)—56th president of Colombia (1994–98); 17th secretary general of Non-Aligned Movement (1995–98); 1st minister of economic development (1990–91)
- Mohammad Musa Shafiq (M.A.)—prime minister of Afghanistan (1972–1973); foreign minister of Afghanistan (1971–1972)
- Tang Shaoyi—twice prime minister of the Republic of China (1912, 1922); first president, Shandong University
- T. V. Soong (Ph.D.)—twice premier of Republic of China (1930 and 1945–1947); minister of finance (1932–1933); governor, Central Bank of China (1928–1931)
- Sun Fo (M.S. 1917)—twice premier of the Republic of China (1931–32, 48–49); president of the Legislative Yuan (1932–48); president of the Examination Yuan (1966–73)
- Charles Robberts Swart (M.S.)—first state president of the Republic of South Africa (1961–1967); last governor-general of the Union of South Africa (1960–1961); acting prime minister (1958)
- Nur Mohammed Taraki—3rd president and 12th prime minister of Afghanistan (1978–1979)
- Chung Un-chan (faculty 1976–78)—40th prime minister of South Korea
- Abdul Zahir (M.D.)—prime minister of Afghanistan; president of Parliament; ambassador to Italy; ambassador to Pakistan
- Zhou Ziqi (B.A.)—former premier and president of the Republic of China

== Notable faculty ==
See also above at Nobel laureates ("Alumni" and "Faculty") for separate listing of 41 notable faculty.

- Alfred Aho—Canadian computer scientist known for co-authorship of the AWK programming language; IEEE John von Neumann Medal (2003)
- Anne Marie Albano—professor of medical psychology; known for clinical work and research on anxiety disorders
- Hattie Alexander—professor of pediatrics, microbiologist; known for Haemophilus influenzae, antibiotic resistance
- Dimitris Anastassiou—professor of electrical engineering, developer of MPEG-2 technology
- Edwin Armstrong—professor, winner of the 1941 Franklin Medal and the 1942 Edison Medal, inventor and the "father of FM radio"
- Karen Barkey—professor of sociology
- Charles A. Beard (Ph.D. 1904)—historian of the first half of the 20th century
- Peter Bearman—professor of sociology
- Daniel Bell (graduate study, 1938–1939)—professor of sociology
- J. Bowyer Bell—adjunct professor at the School of International and Public Affairs, and research associate at the Institute of War and Peace Studies
- Jagdish Bhagwati—professor of economics and law, author of In Defense of Globalization
- Franz Boas—"father" of American anthropology
- Sophie Body-Gendrot—French sociologist
- C. Louise Boehringer—first female superintendent of schools, Yuma County and first female to be elected to office in Arizona
- Lee Bollinger (J.D.)—university president, law professor, First Amendment scholar, Affirmative Action advocate
- Hjalmar Hjorth Boyesen—professor of Germanic languages
- Robert Branner—professor of art history and archeology (1957–1969, 1971–1973)
- Ronald Breslow—university professor of chemistry, biology, pharmacology, and engineering; Priestley Medal (1999); Perkin Medal (2010)
- Alan Brinkley—professor of American history and university provost; son of newscaster David Brinkley
- Zbigniew Brzezinski—National Security advisor under the Carter Administration, taught Foreign Affairs
- Richard Bulliet—history professor and Middle East scholar, author of Kicked to Death by a Camel
- John Burgess—founder of modern political science
- Santiago Calatrava (honorary doctorate, 2007)—architect, sculptor and structural engineer, designer of Montjuic Communications Tower and World Trade Center Transportation Hub
- Stephen Cameron—financial analyst and adjunct associate professor (2003–present) and former associate professor (1994–2003) of International and Public Affairs; noted for studies on GED
- Gabo Camnitzer—artist, educator
- Neil W. Chamberlain—business professor and industrial relations scholar
- Charles F. Chandler—chemist, first dean of Columbia University's School of Mines
- Kartik Chandran—environmental engineer, MacArthur Fellowship Recipient 2015
- Partha Chatterjee—anthropologist and scholar of postcolonial nationalism
- Thomas J. Christensen—political scientist and interim dean of the School of International and Public Affairs, Columbia University
- Richard Clarida—C. Lowell Harriss Professor of Economics and International Affairs at Columbia University and current vice chair of the Federal Reserve
- Hillary Clinton—First Lady of the United States, United States senator from New York, 67th United States secretary of state
- George R. Collins—professor of art history (1946–1986)
- Lee Saunders Crandall—ornithologist and general curator of the Bronx Zoo
- Lorenzo da Ponte—first professor of Italian language and literature at Columbia; librettist to Wolfgang Amadeus Mozart
- Hamid Dabashi—cultural and literary critic
- Alexander Dallin—history and political science professor, director of Russian Institute
- Samuel J. Danishefsky—professor of chemistry, winner of the Wolf Prize in Chemistry in 1995/96
- Pierre Dansereau—Canadian ecologist known as one of the "fathers of ecology"
- Arthur Danto—Johnsonian Professor of Philosophy emeritus, art critic
- William Theodore de Bary—scholar and translator of East Asian texts, particularly classical Chinese canon
- Victoria de Grazia—professor of history, founding editor of Radical History Review
- Andrew Delbanco—2012 National Humanities Medal; director of American Studies at Columbia University
- Emanuel Derman—professor and director of Columbia's financial engineering program, co-author of the Financial Modelers' Manifesto
- Donald Dewey—former Economics professor
- John Dewey—former Philosophy professor
- William Diver—linguistics professor, founder of the Columbia School of Linguistics
- Theodosius Dobzhansky—researcher, graduate study, professor in population genetics; National Medal of Science in 1964; Franklin Medal in 1973
- Andrew Dolkart—architectural historian
- Ann Douglas—cultural critic, recipient of the Beveridge Award and Merle Curti Award
- Karen Duff—Potamkin Prize-winning pathologist
- John R. Dunning—physicist who played key role in the development of the atomic bomb
- Samuel Eilenberg—winner of the Wolf Prize in Mathematics in 1986
- Arnold Eisen—chancellor, Jewish Theological Seminary of America
- Jon Elster—Robert Merton Professor of Social Science, leading theorist of rational choice theory, Marxism, and social theory
- Niki Erlenmeyer-Kimling—professor of clinical psychiatry
- William Maurice Ewing—earth scientist and pioneer
- Awi Federgruen—affiliate professor of Operations Research and Industrial Engineering
- Enrico Fermi—Manhattan Project member, Nobel laureate
- Edgar Fiedler (1929–2003)—economist
- Miloš Forman—film director, One Flew Over the Cuckoo's Nest, Amadeus, The People vs. Larry Flynt, two Academy Awards
- Virginia Page Fortna—political scientist, recipient of the 2010 Karl Deutsch Award from the International Studies Association
- Annette Baker Fox—international relations scholar
- William T. R. Fox—political scientist and international relations theoretician
- David Freedberg—art historian
- Ferdinand Freudenstein—Higgins Professor Emeritus of Mechanical Engineering
- Fred W. Friendly—CBS News producer and media scholar
- Erich Fromm—psychologist
- Zvi Galil (born 1947)—Israeli computer scientist, mathematician, and President of Tel Aviv University
- Patrick X. Gallagher—professor emeritus of mathematics
- Herbert J. Gans—professor of sociology; author of Popular Culture and High Culture
- Kristine Gebbie—professor of nursing and Bill Clinton's first AIDS Czar
- Frank Gehry—Pritzker Prize-winning architect
- Harry Gideonse (1901–1985)—president of Brooklyn College, and chancellor of the New School for Social Research
- Dorian M. Goldfeld—professor of mathematics
- Robert Gooding-Williams—M. Moran Weston/Black Alumni Council Professor of African-American Studies and professor of Philosophy
- Al Gore—vice president of the United States
- Benjamin Graham—father of value investing, mentor of Warren Buffett
- Brian Greene—mathematics and physics professor, researcher and author in String Theory
- Sunil Gulati—professor of economics and chair of the U.S. Soccer Federation
- Joan Dye Gussow—food policy expert
- Georg Friedrich Haas—professor of composition
- Richard S. Hamilton—Davies Professor of mathematics; awarded Shaw Prize (2011), Leroy P. Steele Prize (2009), Clay Research Award (2003), Veblen Prize (1996)
- Cyril M. Harris—professor of electrical engineering and architect
- Carl Hart—first African-American tenured sciences professor at Columbia
- Ross Hassig—anthropologist and Mesoamerica scholar
- Howard Hibbard—professor of Italian Baroque Art
- Roger Hilsman—political scientist, author, and government official
- Richard Hofstadter—historian
- Ralph Holloway—physical anthropologist
- Carl Hovde—professor and dean during the Columbia University protests of 1968
- Andreas Huyssen—Villard Professor of German and Comparative Literature
- David Ignatow—poet, Bollingen Prize winner
- Kenneth T. Jackson—historian of New York City
- Lawrence R. Jacobs—political scientist and founder and director of the Center for the Study of Politics and Governance at the University of Minnesota
- Jon Jaques—professional basketball player, assistant basketball coach (Cornell University)
- Hervé Jacquet—professor emeritus of mathematics
- Eric Kandel—neuroscientist, 2000 Nobel Prize laureate; biophysicist, uncovered secrets of synapses; professor at College of Physicians & Surgeons (1974–); research with the Biomedical Engineering department
- Thomas Christian Kavanagh—professor of civil engineering
- Donald Keene—Japanese studies expert
- James Kent—first professor of law at Columbia College (1793–98), legal scholar and jurist, author of seminal "Commentaries on American Law", on state, federal, and international law, and the law of personal rights and property
- Rashid Khalidi—Middle East historian
- Cinta Laura Kiehl—Indonesian actress, singer, model and ambassador of anti-violence against women and children by the Indonesian Ministry of Women Empowerment and Child Protection
- Philip Kim—professor of applied physics and mathematics
- Grayson L. Kirk—former president and instrumental in the founding of the United Nations Security Council
- Kenneth Koch—poet
- Masatake Kuranishi—professor emeritus of mathematics
- Klaus Lackner—professor of environmental engineering
- Serge Lang—former professor of mathematics, recipient of the 1960 Cole Prize, and political activist
- Arthur M. Langer—professor of professional practice, academic director of the M.S. in professional technology program and founder of Workforce Opportunity Services
- Jaron Lanier—visiting scholar at the Computer Science department
- Leon M. Lederman—Nobel laureate, discoverer of muon neutrino '62, bottom quark '77; professor (1951–1989); M.A., Ph.D. Columbia
- Tsung Dao Lee—physics professor, Nobel laureate
- Rudolph Leibel—Christopher J. Murphy Memorial Professor of Diabetes; co-discovered the hormone leptin, and cloned the leptin and leptin receptor genes, which have had a major role in the area of understanding human obesity
- Mark Lilla—professor of humanities; historian of ideas
- Konrad Lorenz—psychology professor, Nobel laureate (Physiology or Medicine, 1973)
- Walther Ludwig—classical studies professor
- Nicholas F. Maxemchuk—professor of electrical engineering
- Dusa McDuff—professor of mathematics
- Myrtle Byram McGraw—psychologist, neurobiologist, and child development researcher
- John Anthony McGuckin—professor of Byzantine Christian Studies
- Rustin McIntosh—former pediatrics professor
- Margaret Mead—professor of anthropology
- Don Melnick—professor of environmental biology and advisor to the UN on environmental issues
- Edward Mendelson—Lionel Trilling Professor in the Humanities
- Robert K. Merton—professor of sociology; founder of sociology of science; National Medal of Science
- Jacob Millman—professor of electrical engineering, creator of Millman's theorem
- C. Wright Mills—professor of sociology
- Eben Moglen—Law and the Internet Society, general counsel of FSF
- Sidney Morgenbesser—John Dewey Professor of Philosophy
- Robert Mundell—economics professor, 1999 Nobel laureate in Economics
- John Hine Mundy—professor of medieval history, former president of the Medieval Academy of America
- Tristan Murail—professor of music composition, French composer
- Mira Nair—director of Monsoon Wedding, film studies professor
- P. T. Narasimhan—theoretical chemist, Shanti Swarup Bhatnagar laureate
- Shree K. Nayar—professor of computer science, scholar noted for his work in the fields of computational imaging and computer vision
- Franz Leopold Neumann—political science professor, Communist spy in Redhead group
- Gertrude Fanny Neumark—expert on doping wide-band semiconductors
- Robert S. Neuwirth—Babcock Professor of Obstetrics and Gynecology; pioneer in the use of gynecological endoscopy
- Kimberly Noble—professor of Neuroscience and Education at Teachers College, Columbia University; American Psychological Association Distinguished Contributions to Psychology in the Public Interest Award
- Robert G. O'Meally—Grammy Award-nominated producer, professor of English and comparative literature
- Rebecca Oppenheimer—astronomical instrument builder; pioneer in studying exoplanet and substellar atmospheres; co-discoverer of first known brown dwarf
- Kevin O'Rourke—Irish economist, now Chichele Professor of Economic History at the University of Oxford
- John Ordronaux—Civil War army surgeon, professor of medical jurisprudence, mental health commissioner
- Victor Perlo—economics professor, Soviet spymaster involved in Harold Ware spy ring and Perlo group as shown in Venona list of suspected subversives in the U.S.
- Edmund Phelps—economist and Nobel laureate
- Charles Lane Poor—astronomer
- William Popper—Gustav Gottheil lecturer in Semitic languages
- Peter Pouncey—classicist, novelist, college dean 1972–1976, former president of Amherst College
- Mihajlo Idvorski Pupin—professor, Serbian physicist and physical chemist whose inventions include the Pupin coil
- Isidor Isaac Rabi—professor, Ph.D. from Columbia (1927), Nobel laureate, discoverer of nuclear magnetic resonance
- Eliezer Rafaeli—founding president of the University of Haifa
- Shivaram Rajgopal—vice dean for research at Columbia Business School, professor of accounting and auditing
- Norman Foster Ramsey Jr. (B.A. 1935, Ph.D. 1940, Columbia)—professor 1940–1947; 1989 Nobel Prize in Physics, IEEE Medal of Honor, discovery of deuteron electric quadrupole moment, molecular beam spectroscopy
- Hyman G. Rickover—developer of the nuclear submarine, master's degree in electrical engineering
- Michael Riffaterre—university professor, French & Romance philology, semiotician
- Mary Robinson—7th president of Ireland, professor of practice in international affairs
- Joseph Rothschild—political science and history professor, teacher of Contemporary Civilization
- Jeffrey Sachs—head of the United Nations Millennium Project to end poverty, author of The End of Poverty
- Edward W. Said—university professor, professor of English and comparative literature, Palestinian activist, author of Orientalism, widely considered founder of Postcolonial studies
- Mario Salvadori—architect, structural engineer, professor (1940s–1990s), consultant on Manhattan Project, inventor of thin concrete shells
- Andrew Sarris—film studies professor and auteur theorist
- Saskia Sassen—Dutch-American sociologist noted for analyses of globalization and international human migration; coined the term "global city"
- Warner R. Schilling—political scientist and international relations scholar
- Avinoam Shalem—art historian, 24th director of the American Academy in Rome
- Simon Schama—history professor
- James Schamus—film studies professor, co-president of Focus Features, three-time Academy Award-nominated and BAFTA Award-winning film screenwriter and producer
- Robert Y. Shapiro—chairman of the Roper Center for Public Opinion Research, president of the Academy of Political Science, editor of the Political Science Quarterly
- Marshall D. Shulman—scholar of Soviet studies; founding director of the Russian Institute
- Henry Slonimsky—philosophy professor
- Sonia Sotomayor—lecturer in law, Columbia Law School (1999–); nominated by President Barack Obama, on May 26, 2009, to be a justice of the United States Supreme Court
- Gayatri Chakravorty Spivak—English professor
- Henry Spotnitz—affiliate professor of biomedical engineering
- Clifford Stein—professor of operations research and industrial engineering
- Julian Steward—anthropologist, authority on cultural ecology
- Joseph Stiglitz—economics professor, 2001 Nobel laureate in Economics
- Gilbert Stork—winner of the Wolf Prize in Chemistry in 1995/6
- Horst Ludwig Störmer—I.I. Rabi professor of physics and applied physics, winner of 1998 Nobel Prize in Physics
- Mark Strand—poet, former U.S. Poet Laureate, Bollingen and Pulitzer Prize winner
- Bjarne Stroustrup—creator of the C++ programming language
- Man-Chung Tang—professor of civil engineering and former chairman of American Society of Civil Engineers
- David Tannor (born 1958), theoretical chemist, visiting professor, Hermann Mayer Professorial Chair in the Department of Chemical Physics at the Weizmann Institute of Science
- Alan M. Taylor—economist
- Marco Tedesco—climatologist
- Edward Lee Thorndike—"father" of American experimental psychology
- Robert Thurman—Je Tsong Khapa Professor of Indo-Tibetan Buddhist Studies, first American Tibetan Buddhist monk, father of actress Uma Thurman
- Charles Tilly—professor of sociology
- William York Tindall—James Joyce scholar
- Oliver Samuel Tonks—lecturer of Ancient Greek
- Adam Tooze—historian
- Olivier Toubia—Glaubinger Professor of Business
- Charles Hard Townes—professor and Nobel Prize-winning physicist, helped invent the laser
- Joseph F. Traub—founding chairman of the computer science department at Columbia
- Lionel Trilling—literary scholar
- Harold Clayton Urey—professor, Nobel laureate (1934), extensive development in the Manhattan Project, discoverer of deuterium
- Carl Van Doren—Pulitzer Prize-winning biographer
- Charles Van Doren—English professor whose national disgrace was the subject of the Oscar-nominated film Quiz Show
- Mark Van Doren—Pulitzer Prize-winning poet
- Vladimir Vapnik—professor of computer science and co-developer of Vapnik–Chervonenkis theory
- Geovanny Vicente—associate professor of strategic communications and CNN columnist
- Kenneth Waltz—political science professor, neorealism scribe
- Duncan Watts—professor of sociology, author of Six Degrees and Small Worlds
- Sheldon Weinig—professor of operations research and industrial engineering and founder of Materials Research Corporation
- Maxine Weinstein
- David Weiss Halivni—rabbi, founder of Union for Traditional Judaism and developer of source-critical analysis of the Talmud
- Ruth Westheimer (born Karola Siegel, 1928; known as "Dr. Ruth"), German-American sex therapist, talk show host, author, professor, Holocaust survivor, and former Haganah sniper
- Nancy Wexler—Higgins Professor of Neuropsychology
- Harrison White—professor of sociology
- Enos Wicher—professor and Soviet spy named in Venona list of suspected subversives in the U.S., stepfather of State Department Soviet spy Flora Wovschin
- Peter Woit—mathematics professor, skeptic of string theory
- Michael Wood—professor of English and comparative literature, holds endowed chair of English at Princeton
- Howard Wriggins—political science and international relations professor, also U.S. ambassador to Sri Lanka and the Maldives
- Chien-Shiung Wu—physics professor, first woman to head the American Physical Society, winner of the Wolf Prize in Physics in 1978
- Mihalis Yannakakis—professor of computer science, scholar noted for his work in the fields of Computational complexity theory, databases
- Yosef Hayim Yerushalmi—Salo Wittmayer Baron Professor of Jewish History at Culture and Society
- Shou-Wu Zhang—former professor of mathematics; specializes in number theory and arithmetical algebraic geometry; winner of the Guggenheim Fellowship in 2009 and Fields Medal finalist
- Theodore Zoli—adjunct professor of civil engineering and structural engineer

== University professors ==
- Richard Axel—molecular biology and neuroscience, 1999
- Jagdish Bhagwati—economics and law, 2001
- Martin Chalfie—biology, 2013
- Ruth DeFries—sustainable development, 2016
- Michael W. Doyle—international affairs, law, and political science, 2015
- Nabila El-Bassel—social work, and public health, 2019
- Wafaa El-Sadr—public health, 2013
- Saidiya Hartman—English and comparative literature, 2020
- Wayne Hendrickson—biochemistry and molecular biophysics
- Eric R. Kandel—neurobiology, behavior and learning, 1983
- Rosalind E. Krauss—art history, 2005
- Jeffrey Sachs—economics, 2016
- Simon Schama—history and art history
- Gayatri Chakravorty Spivak—English and comparative literature, 2007
- Joseph Stiglitz—economics, 2001
- Gordana Vunjak-Novakovic—biomedical engineering, 2017

=== University professors emeriti ===
- Caroline Bynum—history, 1999
- Tsung-Dao Lee—theoretical physics

=== Former university professors ===
- Jacques Barzun—cultural history
- Ronald Breslow—organic chemistry, 1992
- Samuel Eilenberg—mathematics, 1974
- R. Kent Greenawalt—jurisprudence and constitutional law, 1991
- Louis Henkin—international law, 1981
- Donald Keene—Japanese studies, 1988
- Grayson L. Kirk—university president, 1953–68
- Robert K. Merton—sociology, 1974
- Robert A. Mundell—economics
- Ernest Nagel—philosophy
- Isidor Isaac Rabi—physics, 1964
- Michael Riffaterre—semiotics, theory of literature and French literature, 1982
- Edward Said—comparative literature, literary theory, and cultural studies, 1992
- Meyer Schapiro—art history
- Sol Spiegelman—genetics and microbiology
- Fritz Stern—history, 1992
- Lionel Trilling—literature, 1970
- Jeremy Waldron—law, 2005, left Columbia in 2006

== Others ==
- Seth Low Professor of the University Lee C. Bollinger, law
- John Mitchell Mason Professor of the University Jonathan R. Cole, sociology
- John Mitchell Mason Professor Emeritus of the University Wm. Theodore de Bary, East Asian studies, 1979
