= De los Reyes =

De los Reyes is a Spanish name of religious origin, meaning 'of the kings', with reference to the Biblical Magi. Notable people and places with the name include:

People

- Andres (Andy) De Los Reyes (born 1978), American Psychologist
- Antonio de los Reyes (1729–1787), Catholic bishop in Mexico
- Antonio de los Reyes Correa (1665–1758), Puerto Rican native who served in the Spanish Army
- Baltasar de los Reyes (1606–1673), Spanish Catholic bishop
- Christina de los Reyes (born 1994), Filipino soccer player
- Cosme Gómez Tejada de los Reyes (died c.1661), Spanish writer, poet and dramatist
- Daniel de los Reyes (born 1962), American percussionist
- Diego de los Reyes Balmaseda (fl.1690–1733), Spanish merchant and Governor of Paraguay
- Geronimo B. de los Reyes Jr. (1936–2020), Filipino entrepreneur, philanthropist and art collector
- Hugo de los Reyes Chávez (born 1933), Venezuelan politician
- Isabelo de los Reyes (1864–1938), Filipino writer, activist, and politician
- Jeny de los Reyes Aguilar (1977–2010), Mexican politician
- John Carlos de los Reyes (born 1970), Filipino politician
- José de los Reyes Berreyesa (1785–1846), landowner in California (New Spain)
- Juan de los Reyes (c.1652–1676), Spanish Catholic priest and evangelist killed in Guam.
- Kamar de los Reyes (born 1967), Cuban-Puerto Rican theatre, television and film actor
- Maryo J. de los Reyes (1952–2018), Filipino film and television director
- Mateo García de los Reyes (1872–1936), Spanish admiral and minister of the navy, organizer and first chief of the Spanish Navy Submarine Force
- Samu de los Reyes (born 1992), Spanish soccer player
- Thiago de Los Reyes (born 1989), Brazilian actor
- Virgilio de los Reyes, Filipino lawyer and administrator
- Walfredo de los Reyes (1933–2025), Cuban percussionist and educator

Places

- Alcázar de los Reyes Cristianos, castle in Córdoba, Spain
- Amatlán de los Reyes, municipality in Veracruz, Mexico
- Church of Santa María de los Reyes, Laguardia, Spain
- Monastery of San Juan de los Reyes, Franciscan monastery in Toledo, Spain
- Palacio de los Reyes de Navarra (disambiguation)
- Parque de Los Reyes, urban park in Santiago, Chile
- Rancho Punta de los Reyes, Mexican land grant in California
- San Sebastián de los Reyes, municipality in Madrid, Spain
  - UD San Sebastián de los Reyes, Spanish soccer team
- Villaseco de los Reyes, village and municipality in western Spain

== See also ==
- Los Reyes (disambiguation)
- Reyes (disambiguation)
- Ríos (disambiguation)
- Los Super Reyes, American musical group from Corpus Christi, Texas, USA
  - El Regreso de los Reyes, debut studio album by Mexican-American cumbia group Cruz Martínez y Los Super Reyes
