= American Psychological Association of Graduate Students =

Constituency within the APA

- Formation: 1988; 37 years ago
- Headquarters: 750 First Street, NE; Washington, D.C., U.S.
- Website: www.apa.org/apags

The American Psychological Association of Graduate Students (APAGS) is a constituency group within the American Psychological Association (APA) that represents APA graduate student affiliate members. Founded in 1988, APAGS represents approximately one-third of all members of the American Psychological Association, making it one of the largest constituency groups within the association and the largest group of organized graduate psychology students worldwide.

== History ==
APAGS was formed by David Pilon and Scott Mesh, who were graduate students in clinical psychology. Pilon was a graduate student at the University of Waterloo and Scott Mesh was a graduate student at Saint John's University in Queens, New York City. Psychologists Raymond D. Fowler, Pierre Ritchie, Ellin Bloch, Virginia Staudt Sexton, John D. Hogan, Jeff Nevid, and Louis Primavera helped Pilon and Mesh lay the groundwork to form APAGS at the August 1988 meeting of the American Psychological Association in Atlanta, Georgia.

Since its beginnings in 1988 with about 18,000 members, APAGS has grown to one-third of APA's total membership and has become one of the largest constituency groups within APA. APAGS is composed of a governing committee, five subcommittees, and several task forces. APAGS has gained voting seats in APA governance groups such as the Committee on Accreditation and the Council of Representatives.

The APAGS chairpersons throughout the years:

- Scott Mesh and David Pilon (1988—1989)
- Dawn Royall (1989—1990)
- James Campbell (1990—1991)
- Robert Rella (1991—1992)
- Bridget Cabibi (1992—1993)
- Randy Hofer (1993—1994)
- Matthew Simpson (1994—1995)
- Miguel Ybarra (1995—1996)
- Barbara Beauchamp (1996—1997)
- Mitch Prinstein (1997—1998)
- Marcia Moody (1998—1999)
- Carol Williams-Nickelson (1999—2000)
- Marcus Patterson (2000—2001)
- Derek Snyder (2001—2002)
- Christopher W. Loftis (2002—2003)
- Jennifer Doran (2014-2015)
- Emily Voelkel (2015-2016)
- Christine Jehu (2016-2017)
- Ian Gutierrez (2017)
- Justin Karr (2018)
- Roseann Fish Getchell (2019)
- Blanka Angyal (2020)
- Mary Fernandes (2021)
- Tiffany Parisi (2022)
- Quincy Guinadi (2023)
