= SSSP =

SSSP may refer to:

== Technology ==
- Samsung Smart Signage Platform, a smart TV
- Single-source shortest paths; finding a path between two vertices in a graph, such that the sum of the weights is minimized

== Entertainment ==
- Sawaare Sabke Sapne... Preeto, an Indian television series

== Learned societies ==
- Society for the Study of Social Problems, a learned society dedicated to research in the social sciences
- Society for the Scientific Study of Psychopathy, a learned society dedicated to studying psychopathy
- Soil Science Society of Poland, a learned society dedicated to soil science research
