= Paul Frick =

American psychologist

Paul J. Frick
- Education: Louisiana State University; University of Georgia
- Known for: Research on psychopathy
- Awards: 2015 Robert D. Hare Lifetime Achievement Award from the Society for the Scientific Study of Psychopathy
- Scientific career
- Fields: Clinical psychology
- Institutions: University of New Orleans; Louisiana State University
- Thesis: Patterns of parent and family characteristics associated with oppositional defiant disorder and conduct disorder in boys (1990)
- Doctoral advisor: Benjamin Lahey

Paul Joseph Frick is an American psychologist and the Roy Crumpler Memorial Chair in psychology at Louisiana State University (LSU), as well as a professor at the Learning Sciences Institute of Australia at Australian Catholic University. He is known for his research on psychopathy and antisocial behavior in children, which he has been studying for over twenty years.

== Biography ==
Frick was educated at Louisiana State University and the University of Georgia. While still training to become a family therapist, he changed his mind after deciding that treatments for child aggression were not effective enough, so instead he chose to study the causes of such behavior. Before joining the faculty of LSU in 2015, he was a University Distinguished Professor of psychology at the University of New Orleans, where he was chair of the psychology department from 2007 to 2015. He was the president of the Society for the Scientific Study of Psychopathy from 2009 to 2011, and editor-in-chief of the Journal of Clinical Child & Adolescent Psychology from 2007 to 2011. Since 2018, he has been editor-in-chief of the Journal of Abnormal Child Psychology. In 2015, he received the Robert D. Hare Lifetime Achievement Award from the Society for the Scientific Study of Psychopathy.
