= Chris Patrick =

Chris Patrick may refer to:

- Chris Patrick (gridiron football) (born 1984), American former gridiron football offensive tackle
- Chris Patrick (ice hockey) (born 1976), American ice hockey executive
- Chris Patrick (rapper) (born 1996), American rapper

== See also ==
- Christopher Patrick, Canadian psychologist
