= Balthasar de Sorba =

Genoese knight and admiral

Balthasar de Sorba was a Genoese knight, who served as admiral of Dalmatia to King Louis I of Hungary, and as bailli of the Principality of Achaea in 1370–1373, for Prince Philip of Taranto. In the latter post he became known for his brutality and arbitrariness, which provoked the ire of the Republic of Venice and of the local magnates; the Latin Archbishop of Patras, John Piacentini, even fled his see and offered to surrender it to Venice. This was foiled only by the death of Prince Philip and the recall of his bailli.

== Sources ==
- Topping, Peter (1975). "The Morea, 1364–1460". In Setton, Kenneth M.; Hazard, Harry W. (eds.). A History of the Crusades, Volume III: The Fourteenth and Fifteenth Centuries. Vol. 3. Madison and London: University of Wisconsin Press. pp. 141–166. ISBN 0-299-06670-3.
