= Los Reyes =

Los Reyes may refer to:

== Places ==
=== Mexico ===
- Los Reyes, Michoacán
- Los Reyes Acaquilpan, La Paz, State of Mexico
- Los Reyes, Veracruz
- Los Reyes metro station, a station on the Mexico City Metro

=== Peru ===
- Lima, capital city of Peru

== Other uses ==
- Los Reyes (TV series), a serial drama
- Gipsy Kings, a musical group, formerly known as Los Reyes

== See also ==
- De los Reyes, a surname
- Reyes (disambiguation)
