= William Pelham =

William Pelham may refer to:

- William Pelham (soldier) (died 1587)
- William Pelham (bookseller) (1759-1827)
- William Pelham (Medal of Honor recipient), American Civil War sailor
- William E. Pelham, American clinical psychologist
