= William E. Pelham =

American clinical psychologist

- Born: William Ellerbe Pelham Jr. January 22, 1948; Atlanta, Georgia, U.S.
- Died: October 21, 2023 (aged 75); Miami, Florida, U.S.
- Education: Dartmouth College; State University of New York at Stony Brook
- Known for: Research on attention-deficit/hyperactivity disorder
- Awards: Society of Clinical Child and Adolescent Psychology Career Achievement Award (2009)
- Scientific career
- Fields: Child and adolescent psychiatry
- Institutions: State University of New York at Buffalo; Florida International University
- Thesis: Selective attention in children with reading disabilities (1976)

William Ellerbe Pelham Jr. (January 22, 1948 – October 21, 2023) was an American clinical psychologist known for his research on ADHD. He was Distinguished University Professor and director of the Center for Children and Families at Florida International University. He was educated at Dartmouth College and the State University of New York at Stony Brook. He was a fellow of the American Psychological Association (APA) and the American Psychological Society, and he has served as president of the APA's Division 53 (the Society of Clinical Child and Adolescent Psychology) and the International Society for Research in Child and Adolescent Psychopathology.

== Education and academic career ==
Pelham received his B.A. from Dartmouth College in 1970 and his Ph.D. in clinical psychology from the State University of New York at Stony Brook in 1976. Before joining the faculty of FIU in 2010, he taught at the State University of New York at Buffalo, where he ran a program and summer camp for children with ADHD for fourteen years. When he joined the faculty of FIU, he took the ADHD program with him. He also taught at Washington State University, Florida State University, and the University of Pittsburgh before joining FIU. Pelham died at a hospital in Miami on October 21, 2023.
