= Russell Barkley =

American psychologist and author (born 1949)

Russell Barkley Ph.D. FAPA
- Barkley in 2019
- Born: December 27, 1949 (age 76); Newburgh, New York. United States
- Education: Wayne Community College (A.A.); UNC Chapel Hill (B.A., Psychology); Bowling Green State University (M.A., Ph.D. Clinical Psychology)
- Occupations: Professor, clinical neuropsychologist, author
- Years active: 1977–present
- Organization: Guilford Press
- Known for: ADHD research
- Notable work: Research contributions; Taking Charge of ADHD; Your Defiant Child; The ADHD Report; Taking Charge of Adult ADHD; Executive Functions: What They Are, How They Work, and Why They Evolved
- Title: Former president of the Section on Clinical Child Psychology (the former Division 12) of the American Psychological Association (APA), and of the International Society for Research in Child and Adolescent Psychopathology.
- Parent(s): Donald Stuart Barkley; Mildred Minerva (née Terbush) Barkley
- Awards: Awards from the American Academy of Pediatrics, the American Psychological Association and others

Academic work
- Discipline: Psychologist
- Website: www.russellbarkley.org

Russell A. Barkley FAPA (born December 27, 1949) is a retired American clinical neuropsychologist who was a clinical professor of psychiatry at the VCU Medical Center until 2022 and president of Division 12 of the American Psychological Association (APA) and of the International Society for Research in Child and Adolescent Psychopathology. Involved in research since 1973 and a licensed psychologist since 1977, he is an internationally recognized expert on attention-deficit hyperactivity disorder (ADHD) and has devoted most of his scientific career to studying ADHD and its related fields like childhood defiance. He proposed the renaming of sluggish cognitive tempo (SCT) to cognitive disengagement syndrome (CDS).

Besides his clinical work, he is also an expert in the neuropsychology of executive function and self-regulation. He is board certified in three clinical specialties by the American Board of Professional Psychology (ABPP): clinical neuropsychology (ABCN), clinical psychology, and clinical child and adolescent psychology.

== Early life and education ==
Russell Alan Barkley was born in Newburgh, New York. He was one of five children, born to US Air Force Colonel Donald Stuart Barkley (27 February 1916 – 15 June 1999) and Mildred Minerva née Terbush (10 September 1914 – 25 April 2008). Barkley served in the United States Air Force from 1968 to 1972, including a tour of duty in Vietnam. He had a fraternal twin brother, Ronald Foster Barkley, who was killed in a car crash on 24 July 2006. Barkley attributes his brother's history of dangerous and reckless behavior, including not wearing a seat belt and speeding at the time of his crash, to untreated ADHD. Ronald was several times over the legal alcohol limit, speeding and not wearing a seat belt at the time of his fatal crash.

Barkley earned an Associate of Arts from Wayne Community College in Goldsboro, North Carolina in June 1972, and a BA in psychology with honors from the University of North Carolina at Chapel Hill. He earned an MA in 1975 and Ph.D. in clinical psychology in 1977 from Bowling Green State University in Bowling Green, Ohio. From July 1976 to 1977, Barkley was an intern in medical psychology at the Child Development Center at the University of Oregon Health Sciences Center in Portland, Oregon.

On the political spectrum, Barkley identifies as a libertarian, having been initially influenced by the scholarly writings of the Austrian School of Economics and Ayn Rand's philosophy of Objectivism, citing Atlas Shrugged as his earliest favourite book.

== Career ==
In 1977, Barkley began his professional career at the Medical College of Wisconsin and Milwaukee Children's Hospital, where in 1978, he founded the Neuropsychology Service and served as its chief until 1985. He then moved to the University of Massachusetts Medical School, where he served as Director of Psychology from 1985 to 2000. Barkley was professor of psychiatry and neurology at the University of Massachusetts Medical Center, where he established clinics and clinical research programs for child and adult ADHD. In 2005, he joined the State University of New York Upstate Medical University (SUNY) in Syracuse, New York, where he was a consultant and research professor of psychiatry until 2010. He taught at the Medical University of South Carolina from 2003 to 2016 and then moved to Virginia Commonwealth University Medical Center in Richmond, Virginia, where he taught in the Department of Psychiatry as voluntary clinical faculty from 2016 until his formal retirement on January 1, 2022.

Until 2022, he served as president of the Section on Clinical Child Psychology (Division 12) of the American Psychological Association (APA) and of the International Society for Research in Child and Adolescent Psychopathology. He is a fellow of the APA.

Barkley led the first International Consensus Statement on ADHD. He is known for his research contributions including multiple papers from his longitudinal study in Milwaukee, Wisconsin; the persistence of ADHD into adulthood; his development of a theory of ADHD as a disorder of executive functioning and self-regulation; establishing the nature of emotional dysregulation in ADHD; early research on family interaction patterns in ADHD children; his more recent studies on the nature of ADHD in adults; initially researching the effects of stimulant medication; early intervention for children at risk for ADHD; training parents to manage ADHD and defiant behavior; the pervasiveness of impairments and long-term risks associated with ADHD; and the nature of cognitive disengagement syndrome.

He has given more than 800 invited lectures in more than 30 countries during his career, as part of his effort to disseminate science. Barkley founded and edited The ADHD Report, a peer-reviewed journal for clinicians and parents, until its 30th and final volume in 2022. He has performed his forever last invited public lecture at the Centro Archimede Medical Centre, where he discussed ADHD, CDS and related topics, in Italy, September 30, 2023.

Besides his books, he has published six clinical rating scales related to ADHD, executive functioning, and impairment and clinical manuals for diagnosis and treatment. One of Barkley's rating scales for adult ADHD evaluates CDS, a distinct syndrome from ADHD.

== Views on medication ==
In 1978, Barkley wrote that "Stimulant drug studies based primarily on measures of teacher opinion have frequently concluded that these drugs improve the achievement of hyperkinetic children. However, a review of those studies using more objective measures of academic performance revealed few positive short-term or long-term drug effects on these measures. What few improvements have been noted can be readily attributed to better attention during testing. The major effect of the stimulants appears to be an improvement in classroom manageability rather than academic performance". In 1991, Barkley noted that "Psychostimulant medications (e.g., Ritalin) are highly effective treatments for the symptomatic management of children with ADHD as they can enhance significantly their attention span, impulse control, academic performance, and peer relationships".

In response to critics who point to countries with lower rates of diagnoses and medication of children for ADHD, Barkley said, "So what? We do not let the rest of the world set our standards of care when we do more research on childhood disorders--specifically ADHD--than other countries combined?".

Barkley believes that medications such as methylphenidate and dextroamphetamine should be downgraded to schedule III.

During an interview in 2001, Barkley said that "All of the research we have indicates that these drugs are some of the safest that we employ in the field of psychiatry and psychology. That's not to say that we know everything about them. But we know a lot more than we know about cough medicines and Tylenol and aspirins and other things that children swill whenever they come down with a common cold. Nobody asks those questions about those over-the-counter medications, yet we know substantially less about them".

Barkley has compared the symptomatic impairments of ADHD to a physical handicap, with accommodations and treatment being the equivalent of a wheelchair. On 16 November 1998 he said that "[methylphenidate] will be ranked as one of the leading developments in this century for helping individuals".

=== Disclosure ===
Barkley declares royalties or licences from Guilford Publications, the American Psychological Association, Professional Education Systems Institute, ContinuingEdCourses; and payment or honoraria for lectures, presentations, speakers’ bureaus, consultancy, manuscript writing, or educational events from AstraZeneca, Takeda, the Medical College of Wisconsin, Eli Lilly, and Ochsner Medical Center.

Books

- Attention Deficit Hyperactivity Disorder: A Handbook for Diagnosis and Treatment.4th ed. New York: Guilford Press, 2015. ISBN 978-1-4625-1772-5.
- Taking Charge of ADHD: The Complete, Authoritative Guide for Parents. 5th ed. New York: Guilford Press, 2021. ISBN 978-1-4625-4267-3
- ADHD and the Nature of Self Control. New York: Guilford Press, 1997. ISBN 978-1-57230-250-1.
- Taking Charge of ADHD: The Complete, Authoritative Guide for Parents. New York: Guilford Press, (3rd ed.) 2013. ISBN 978-1-46250-789-4.
- With Kevin R Murphy and Mariellen Fischer. ADHD in Adults: What the Science Says. New York: Guilford Press, 2008. ISBN 978-1-59385-586-4.
- Attention Deficit Hyperactivity Disorder in Adults: The Latest Assessment and Treatment Strategies. Sudbury, MA: Jones and Bartlett, 2010. ISBN 978-0-7637-6564-4.
- Taking Charge of Adult ADHD. New York: Guilford Press, 2010. ISBN 978-1-60623-338-2.
- Executive Functions: What They Are, How They Work, and Why They Evolved. New York: Guilford Press, 2012. ISBN 978-1-4625-0535-7.
- Defiant Children: a Clinician's Manual for Assessment and Parent Training, 3rd ed. New York: Guilford Publications, 2013. ISBN 978-1-57230-123-8.
- Managing ADHD in School: The Best Evidence-Based Methods for Teachers. Eau Claire, WI: PESI Publishing and Media, 2016. ISBN 978-1559570435.
- When an Adult You Love Has ADHD. Washington, DC: American Psychological Association, 2017. ISBN 9781433823084

== Awards ==
- C. Anderson Aldrich Award, 1996, from the American Academy of Pediatrics for outstanding research in child health and human development
- Distinguished Contribution Award to Research, 1998, by the Section of Clinical Child Psychology of the American Psychological Association
- Science Dissemination Award, 2002, from the Society for Scientific Clinical Psychology of the American Psychological Association
- Distinguished Career Award, 2012, from the Society of Clinical Child and Adolescent Psychology
- Lifetime Career Achievement Award, Division 53 (Clinical Child and Adolescent Psychology), American Psychological Association, 2017
- Lifetime Achievement Award, Children and Adults with ADHD (chadd.org), 2018
