= Eric Youngstrom =

American psychologist

Eric A. Youngstrom
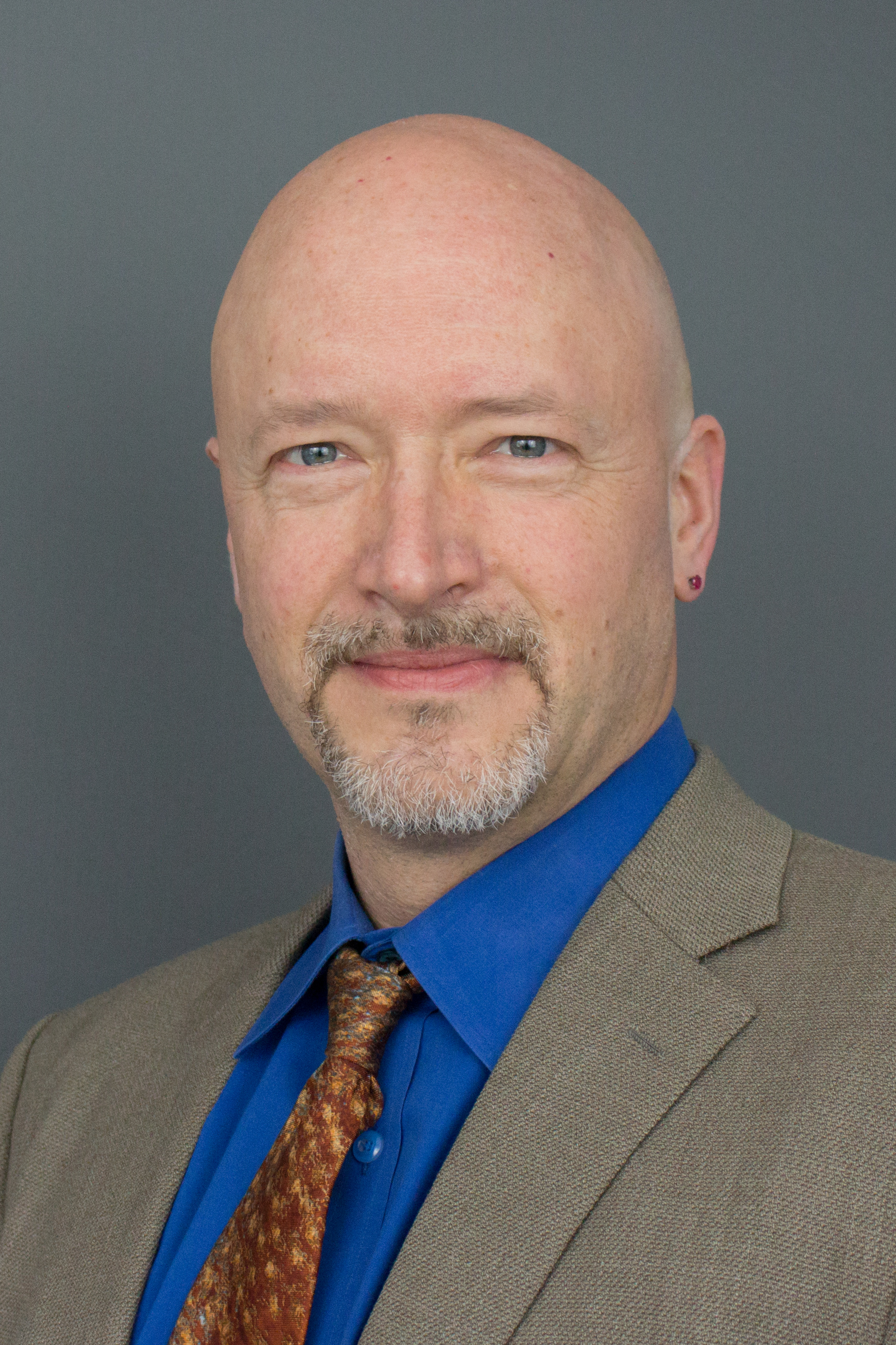
- Born: December 28, 1968 (age 57); St. Louis, MO, United States
- Education: University of Delaware Emory University
- Known for: research on bipolar disorder in children, evidence-based assessment in psychology
- Scientific career
- Fields: Clinical psychologist, Psychological Assessment, Bipolar Disorder
- Workplaces: University of North Carolina at Chapel Hill
- Doctoral advisor: Carroll E. Izard

Eric Arden Youngstrom is an American clinical child and adolescent psychologist, former professor of psychology, neuroscience, and psychiatry, at University of North Carolina at Chapel Hill, and current Director of the Institute for Mental and Behavioral Health Research at Nationwide Children's Hospital in Columbus, Ohio. He is a Fellow of the American Psychological Association. His research focuses on evidence-based assessment, and assessment of bipolar disorder across the life span.

== Work ==
Youngstrom's research areas are evidence-based assessment and the assessment, phenomenology, and course of illness for youths with bipolar disorder. He has developed or co-developed several self- and parent-report psychological measures, including the parent version of the General Behavior Inventory and the 7 Up 7 Down Inventory.

== Professional roles and memberships ==
Youngstrom was the inaugural recipient of the Early Career Award from the Society of Clinical Child and Adolescent Psychology. He is a Fellow of the American Psychological Association, the Association for Psychological Science, and the Association for Behavioral and Cognitive Therapy. He is also an elected full member of the American College of Neuropsychopharmacology. He was president of the Society of Clinical Child & Adolescent Psychology. He served as President-Elect of APA Division 5, Quantitative and Qualitative Methods in 2019, is serving as president in 2020, and will serve as Past-President in 2021.

Youngstrom consulted on the fifth revision of the Diagnostic and Statistical Manual (DSM-5). He chaired the Work Group on Child Diagnosis for the International Society for Bipolar Disorders.
