= Benjamin Lahey =

American psychologist

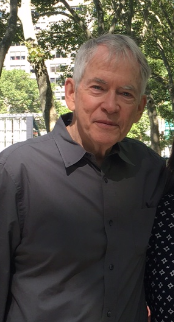
- Education: Davidson College (A.B., 1967); University of Tennessee (Ph.D., 1970)
- Known for: Research on ADHD
- Awards: Fellow of the American Psychological Association and the Association for Psychological Science
- Scientific career
- Fields: Child psychology Psychiatric epidemiology
- Institutions: University of Chicago
- Thesis: Effects of Verbal Response Consequences in Fixed-Trial Choice Learning (1970)
- Doctoral students: Paul Frick

Benjamin Bernard Lahey is an American psychologist and developmental epidemiologist. He is the Irving B. Harris Professor Emeritus in the Departments of Health Studies and Psychiatry and Behavioral Neuroscience at the University of Chicago. He has conducted research on psychological problems in children, adolescents, and adults such as ADHD and antisocial behavior, and he was a member of a scientific panel that constructed the current definition of ADHD in the 1990s. He was one of the authors of the papers that first hypothesized a hierarchical organization of dimensions of psychological problems, with a general factor at the top of the hierarchy. He is a fellow of the American Psychological Association and the Association for Psychological Science. He is also a member of both the International Society for Research in Child and Adolescent Psychopathology and the Society of Clinical Child and Adolescent Psychology, as well as a former president of both organizations. Lahey has received the Distinguished Research Award from the Society of Clinical and Adolescent Psychology.

== Work ==
- Oxford University Press published his 2021 book, "Dimensions of psychological problems: Replacing diagnostic categories with a more science-based and less stigmatizing alternative." ISBN 9780197607909.
