= Andres De Los Reyes =

Professor of psychology

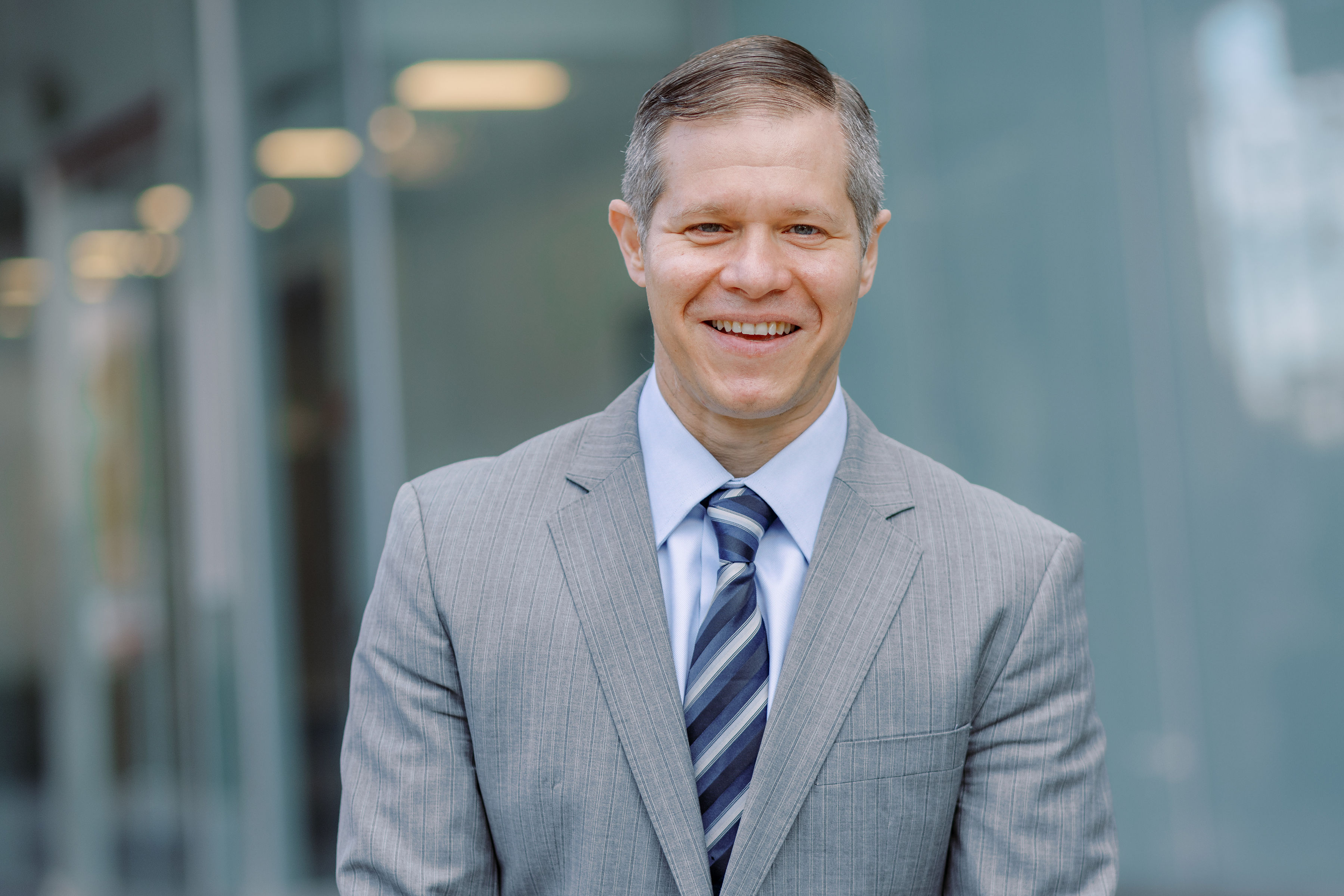
- Born: 1978
- Education: Yale University
- Occupations: Psychologist; adviser; university teacher
- Awards: APA Distinguished Scientific Award for an Early Career Contribution to Psychology (2013)
- Scientific career
- Fields: Social anxiety, family relation, adolescence, psychological evaluation, survey methodology, special education, psychology, counseling, child psychology, adolescent psychology
- Workplaces: University of Maryland
- Website: psyc.umd.edu/facultyprofile/de-los-reyes/andres

Andres De Los Reyes (born March 18, 1978) is a professor of psychology at University of Maryland College Park. He is also the director of the Comprehensive Assessment and Intervention Program Laboratory, editor-in-chief of the Journal of Clinical Child & Adolescent Psychology, the official journal of the Society of Clinical Child and Adolescent Psychology, Division 53 of the American Psychological Association. He also founded and remains a program chair of the JCCAP Future Directions Forum, an annual conference affiliated with the journal. De Los Reyes has co-authored over 100 peer-reviewed scientific articles and book chapters, and recently completed a term as a Fulbright Canada Research Chair in mental health at the University of Regina. He is known for his work on psychological assessment, particularly understanding the potential sources and implications of apparent disagreement between different people's perceptions of youth emotion and behavior, as often happens when parents, teachers, and youths are asked separately about the youth. He also works extensively on issues surrounding mentorship and skills-based approaches to early career development. He is the author of The Early Career Researcher's Toolbox: A career development guide that includes strategies for working with mentors, publishing peer-reviewed articles, and interviewing for faculty positions. Career development coaching and activities are also a prominent feature of the Future Direction Forum.

== Education and degrees ==
He completed a triple major in psychology, political science in criminal justice at Florida International University. He attended Yale University where he received his M.S., M. Phil and Ph.D. in clinical psychology. He completed his clinical psychology internship at the Department of Psychology, Institute for Juvenile Research at University of Illinois at Chicago.

== Positions and roles ==
Professor of Psychology, University of Maryland at College Park

2020–2021, Fulbright Canada Research Chair in Mental Health

Director, Comprehensive Assessment and Intervention Program

Editor, Journal of Clinical Child and Adolescent Psychology

Program Chair, Future Directions Forum

== Research ==
His research broadly focuses on the most common outcomes of youth mental health assessments, more specifically that informants typically involved in these assessments (e.g., parents, teachers, youth themselves) provide discrepant reports about youth mental health, even when they complete the same measures or respond to the same items (i.e., informant discrepancies). His work on these informant discrepancies covers assessments of domains as diverse as autism, social anxiety, disruptive behavior, peer relations, family functioning, depression, and conduct problems

He is interested in understanding what informant discrepancies tell us about youth undergoing evaluation. For instance, when a parent reports high levels of a symptom in their child that a teacher does not corroborate in their report, might such a discrepancy serve as a signal that the youth has mental health needs which appear at home to a greater extent than they do at school? Addressing this question is important because there are no clear guidelines in the field for what to make of this information, and he seeks to mitigate uncertainties in research and clinical service decision-making by understanding factors that reliably predict the occurrence of these discrepancies.

He takes a conceptually grounded and team scholarship approach to examining how informant discrepancies in youth mental health assessments reveal meaningful clinical information regarding the contexts in which the youth display mental health concerns. He works across fields including cognitive science, education, human development, neuroscience, organizational behavior, medicine, and social work.

== Honors and awards ==
Andres De Los Reyes Awards and Honors
Award	Date
Presidential Citation, American Psychological Association	July 25, 2021
Fulbright Canada Research Chair in Mental Health, Fulbright U.S. Scholars Program	2020–2021
Early Career Psychologist Champion Award, American Psychological Association	2021
Elected Member, Sigma Xi (The Scientific Research Honor Society)	2021
Fellow, American Psychological Association: Division 53 (Society of Clinical Child and Adolescent Psychology); Division 5 (Quantitative and Qualitative Methods); Division 12 (Society of Clinical Psychology)	2018, 2020, 2022
Fellow, Association for Psychological Science	2018
Endowed Speaker, Dorosin Memorial Lecture, American College Health Association	2018
Invited Speaker, Festschrift for Dr. Alan E. Kazdin	Tuesday, April 24, 2018
Anastasi Early Career Award, American Psychological Association's Division 5 (Quantitative and Qualitative Methods	2015
Distinguished Scientific Award for an Early Career Contribution to Psychology (Applied Research), American Psychological Association	2013
Early Career Research Contributions Award, Society for Research in Child Development	2013
Rising Star, Association for Psychological Science	2013
President's New Researcher Award, Association for Behavioral and Cognitive Therapies	2011
Early Career Award, American Psychological Association's Division 29 (Psychotherapy)/ American Psychological Foundation	2011

== Selected publications ==
- De Los Reyes, A., Wang, M., Lerner, M.D., Makol, B.A., Fitzpatrick, O., & Weisz, J.R. (2022). The Operations Triad Model and youth mental health assessments: Catalyzing a paradigm shift in measurement validation. Journal of Clinical Child and Adolescent Psychology. Advance online publication. https://doi.org/10.1080/15374416.2022.2111684
- De Los Reyes, A., Talbott, E., Power, T., Michel, J., Cook, C.R., Racz, S.J., & Fitzpatrick, O. (2022). The Needs-to-Goals Gap: How informant discrepancies in youth mental health assessments impact service delivery. Clinical Psychology Review, 92, 102114. https://doi.org/10.1016/j.cpr.2021.102114
- De Los Reyes, A., Tyrell, F.A., Watts, A.L., & Asmundson, G.J.G. (2022). Conceptual, methodological, and measurement factors that disqualify use of measurement invariance techniques to detect informant discrepancies in youth mental health assessments. Frontiers in Psychology, 13, 931296. https://doi.org/10.3389/fpsyg.2022.931296
- Charamut, N.R., Racz, S.J., Wang, Mo, & De Los Reyes, A. (2022). Integrating multi-informant reports of youth mental health: A construct validation test of Kraemer and Colleagues’ (2003) Satellite Model. Frontiers in Psychology, 13, 911629. https://doi.org/10.3389/fpsyg.2022.911629
- Makol, B.A., Youngstrom, E.A., Racz, S.J., Qasmieh, N., Glenn, L.E., & De Los Reyes, A. (2020). Integrating multiple informants’ reports: How conceptual and measurement models may address long-standing problems in clinical decision-making. Clinical Psychological Science, 8(6), 953–970. https://doi.org/10.1177/2167702620924439
- De Los Reyes, A., Augenstein, T. M., Wang, M., Thomas, S. A., Drabick, D. A. G., Burgers, D. E., & Rabinowitz, J. (2015). The validity of the multi-informant approach to assessing child and adolescent mental health. Psychological Bulletin, 141(4), 858–900. https://doi.org/10.1037/a0038498
- De Los Reyes, A., Thomas, S. A., Goodman, K. L., & Kundey, S. M. A. (2013). Principles underlying the use of multiple informants’ reports. Annual Review of Clinical Psychology, 9, 123–149. https://doi.org/10.1146/annurev-clinpsy-050212-185617
- De Los Reyes, A. (2011). Introduction to the Special Section: More Than Measurement Error: Discovering Meaning Behind Informant Discrepancies in Clinical Assessments of Children and Adolescents. Journal of Clinical Child & Adolescent Psychology, 40(1), 1–9. https://doi.org/10.1080/15374416.2011.533405
- De Los Reyes, A., & Kazdin, A. E. (2005). Informant Discrepancies in the Assessment of Childhood Psychopathology: A Critical Review, Theoretical Framework, and Recommendations for Further Study. Psychological Bulletin, 131(4), 483–509. https://doi.org/10.1037/0033-2909.131.4.483
