= Mitch Prinstein =

Clinical psychology professor and researcher

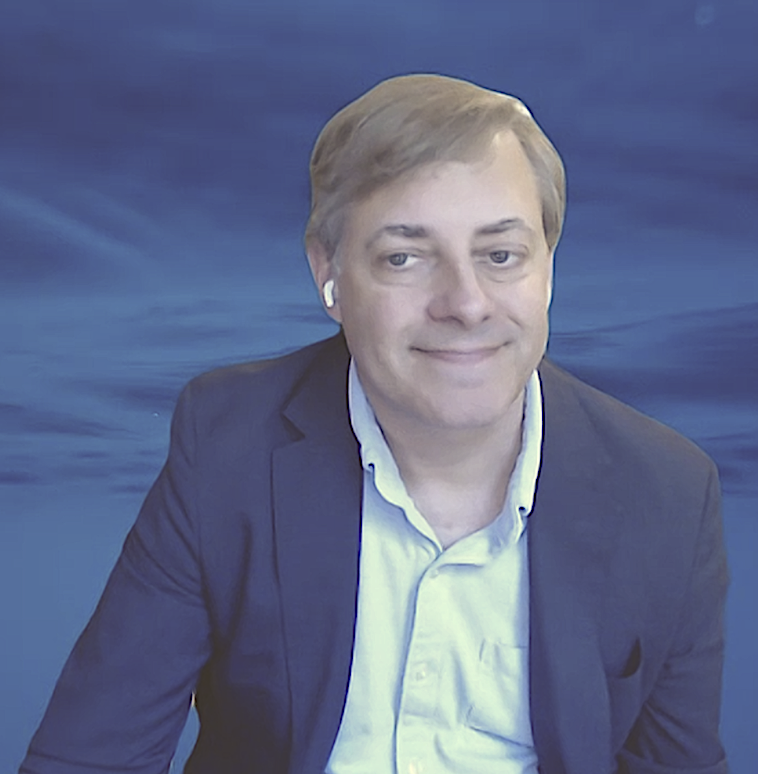
- Prinstein in 2025
- Born: Mitchell J. Prinstein
- Education: University of Miami - M.A., Ph.D. Emory University - B.A.
- Scientific career
- Fields: Clinical psychologist
- Workplaces: American Psychological Association, University of North Carolina at Chapel Hill
- Doctoral students: Matthew Nock
- Website: Mitch Prinstein

Mitchell J. Prinstein is an author and psychology professor. He is the former Director of Clinical Psychology at the University of North Carolina at Chapel Hill, where he also served as the John Van Seters Distinguished Professor and Assistant Dean of Honors Carolina, UNC's Honors program. He is a Fellow of both the American Psychological Association and the Association for Psychological Science. He currently serves as the Chief of Psychology Strategy and Integration for the American Psychological Association (APA), where he previously served on the board of directors and then as the Chief Science Officer.

Prinstein has authored or edited multiple volumes of psychological research, professional development training, an encyclopedia series in adolescent development, and an undergraduate textbook in clinical psychology. He is the author of Popular: Finding Happiness and Success in a World That Cares Too Much About the Wrong Kinds of Relationships, a book describing the role of popularity in society.

== Education and training ==
Prinstein received his B.A. from Emory University. He attended graduate school at University of Miami where he received his M.S. and Ph.D. in clinical psychology. He completed his clinical psychology internship training in clinical child and adolescent psychology at the Brown University Clinical Psychology Training Consortium and was awarded a National Research Service Award from the National Institutes of Health to remain at Brown for his postdoctoral fellowship. He is board certified by the American Board of Professional Psychology in clinical child psychology.

== Publications ==
Prinstein's research focuses on popularity and peer relations, including childhood popularity, peer victimization, friendships, and processes of peer influence. He is the author of Popular: Finding Happiness and Success in a World That Cares Too Much About the Wrong Kinds of Relationships.

In professional development, Prinstein authored "Uncensored Advice for Applying to Graduate School in Clinical Psychology", The Portable Mentor: Expert Guide to a Successful Career in Psychology and Internships in Psychology: The APAGS Workbook for Writing Successful Applications and Finding the Right Fit.

Prinstein is an editor of Understanding Peer Influence in Children and Adolescence, Future Work in Clinical Child and Adolescent Psychology: A Research Agenda, an undergraduate textbook on clinical psychology, an encyclopedia series, Encyclopedia of Adolescence.

== Professional ==
Prinstein served as chair of the American Psychological Association of Graduate Students (APAGS) and was named the first APAGS student representative to the Board of Directors of the APA. He was later appointed Chair of the ad hoc APA workgroup on Early Career Psychologists to advocate for its incorporation as a standing committee of APA. He serves as of 2020 as a Member-at-Large on the APA Council of Representatives and was appointed to the Good Governance Group to improve organizational efficiency.

Prinstein served as President of the executive board of the Society of Clinical Child and Adolescent Psychology.

Prinstein served on the boards of the Council of University Directors of Clinical Psychology, the Publications board of the Association of Behavioral and Cognitive Therapies, and the Council of Specialties in Professional Psychology.

He was an associate editor for the Journal of Consulting and Clinical Psychology and the editor for the Journal of Clinical Child and Adolescent Psychology.
