= Christopher Patrick =

Canadian psychologist

Christopher J. Patrick
- Born: Christopher John Patrick
- Education: University of British Columbia
- Awards: Society for the Scientific Study of Psychopathy Lifetime Scientific Career Contribution Award (2013)
- Scientific career
- Fields: Clinical psychology
- Workplaces: Florida State University
- Thesis: The validity of lie detection with criminal psychopaths (1987)

Christopher J. Patrick is a Canadian psychologist. He is Distinguished Research Professor and Director of Clinical Training in the Department of Psychology at Florida State University. He is noted for his research on psychopathy, and he formulated the triarchic model of psychopathy, which he first described in 2009. He is a past president of both the Society for Psychophysiological Research and the Society for the Scientific Study of Psychopathy. In 2013, he received the Lifetime Scientific Career Contribution Award from the Society for the Scientific Study of Psychopathy.
