= John D. Hogan =

American Psychologist

John D. Hogan (born in 1939) is an American psychologist and noted author on the history of psychology. He is a professor emeritus of psychology at St. John's University in Jamaica, Queens, New York, where he taught for 53 years. Additionally, he served as the history and obituary editor for American Psychologist for thirteen years. He was elected President of Division 52 of the American Psychological Association (International Psychology) for 2011–2012. From 2009 to 2010, he served as President of APA Division One (Society for General Psychology).

Dr. Hogan has conducted research in the areas of Piagetian theory and creativity, as well as developmental and educational psychology. Since the early 1990s, he has written extensively on the subjects of the history of psychology, particularly the history of Developmental Psychology; International Psychology; and the current state of U. S. Psychology. He is the author/editor of four books, 15 chapters, and more than 200 articles, encyclopedia entries, and book reviews. Moreover, he has presented more than 200 papers at professional meetings.

Dr. Hogan earned his M.S. in Counseling Psychology at Iowa State University in 1962 and his Ph.D. in Developmental Psychology at Ohio State University in 1970.
