= Palacio de los Reyes de Navarra =

Palacio de los Reyes de Navarra (Palace of the Kings of Navarre) may refer to:

- Palacio de los Reyes de Navarra, Estella, Romanesque former royal palace of the Kings and Queens of Navarre from the late twelfth century to the mid-fifteenth
- Palace of the Kings of Navarre of Olite, palace and castle of Kings of Navarre, constructed between 13th and 15th centuries at Olite, major seat of the royal court during the reign of Charles III
