= Cosme Gómez Tejada de los Reyes =

Spanish writer, poet, and dramatist

Cosme Gómez Tejada de los Reyes (died c.1661) was a writer, poet and dramatist of the Spanish Golden Age.
