= Olivier Toubia =

Olivier Toubia is the Glaubinger Professor of Business at Columbia Business School, Columbia University. and the Editor-in-Chief of Columbia Business School and the Editor-in-Chief of Marketing Science.

Professor Toubia works on innovation including idea generation.

== Awards ==
- Recipient of the John Little award for best marketing paper
- 2015 Recipient of the Paul E. Green award for a Journal of Marketing Research paper
- 2016 Recipient of the INFORMS Society for Marketing Science Long Term Impact Award
