= John Piacentini =

American clinical child and adolescent psychologist

- Born: John Piacentini; United States
- Education: University of Georgia
- Known for: Research on obsessive–compulsive disorder, tic disorders, trichotillomania
- Scientific career
- Fields: Clinical psychologist
- Workplaces: University of California, Los Angeles, UCLA School of Medicine

John Piacentini is an American clinical child and adolescent psychologist, and professor of psychiatry and biobehavioral sciences at the David Geffen School of Medicine at UCLA in Los Angeles, California. He is the director of the Center for Child Anxiety, Resilience, Education and Support (CARES), and the Child OCD, Anxiety and Tic Disorders Program at UCLA's Semel Institute for Neuroscience and Human Behavior.

== Work ==
Piacentini's research focuses on cognitive behavioral therapy and other treatments for children with obsessive–compulsive disorder, other anxiety disorders, Tourette syndrome and other tic disorders, and trichotillomania. He co-developed the Child OC Impact Scale-Revised (COIS-R) for obsessive–compulsive disorder.

== Professional associations ==
Piacentini is a Fellow of the American Psychological Association and the Association for Psychological Science.

He has served as president of the American Board of Professional Psychology, and the Society of Clinical Child & Adolescent Psychology. He is Chair of the Tourette Association of America Behavioral Sciences Consortium. He served on advisory or scientific boards of the Anxiety and Depression Association of America, the International OCD Foundation, and the TLC Foundation for Body Focused Repetitive Behaviors.

== Books ==
- McGuire JF, Murphy TK, Piacentini J, Storch EA, eds (2018). The Clinician’s Guide to Treatment and Management of Youth with Tourette Syndrome and Tic Disorders. Academic Press. ISBN 978-0128119808
- Piacentini J, Langley A, Roblek T (2007). Cognitive-Behavioral Treatment of Childhood OCD: It's Only a False Alarm Therapist Guide (Treatments That Work). Oxford University Press. ISBN 978-0195310511
