= Jeny de los Reyes Aguilar =

Mexican politician

- Born: 16 December 1977; Morelia, Michoacán, Mexico
- Died: 14 August 2010 (aged 32); La Unión, Guerrero, Mexico
- Occupation: Politician
- Political party: PRI

Jeny de los Reyes Aguilar (16 December 1977 – 14 August 2010) was a Mexican politician from the Institutional Revolutionary Party. She served as Deputy of the LXI Legislature of the Mexican Congress representing Michoacán.

On 14 August 2010 Reyes, her husband and their eight-year-old daughter died on a road accident in Guerrero.
