= Kimberly Noble =

Neuroscientist and pediatrician

- Occupation: Pediatrician

Academic background
- Education: University of Pennsylvania

Academic work
- Institutions: Teachers College, Columbia University

Kimberly G. Noble is an American neuroscientist and pediatrician known for her work in socioeconomic disparities and children's cognitive development. She is Professor of Neuroscience and Education at Teachers College, Columbia University and Director of the Neurocognition, Early Experience and Development (NEED) Lab.

Noble is a Principal Investigator of the Baby's First Years study, which was the first clinical trial to assess the relation between poverty and children's cognitive and emotional development, as well as brain development during the first three years of their lives. Findings from this study have been featured in the New York Times, The Economist, and in Bloomberg News.

== Biography ==
Kimberly Noble is from Broomall, Pennsylvania, a suburb in Philadelphia. Noble received her B.A. in Biological Basis of Behavior from the University of Pennsylvania, and her Ph.D. in Neuroscience, and M.D. in Medicine via a joint program in 2005, also from the University of Pennsylvania. Noble worked with mentor Martha J. Farah, a cognitive neuroscientist and researcher at University of Pennsylvania, on research projects on socioeconomic status and childhood cognitive achievement.

She completed her postdoctoral training at the Sackler Institute of Developmental Psychobiology at Weill Cornell Medical College and she completed her residency work in pediatrics at Columbia University Irving Medical Center and Morgan Stanley Children's Hospital of New York-Presbyterian in New York City.

Agencies that have supported Noble's work include the National Institute of Child Health and Human Development, the Ford Foundation, the Russell Sage Foundation, the Child Welfare Fund, the Bill and Melinda Gates Foundation, and the NYC Mayor's Office for Economic Opportunity. Some of the grants that have been awarded to Noble and her team include a 2.4 million dollar grant from the National Institute of Child Health and Human Development for her project on socioeconomic disparities in cognitive and neural development in the first three years, and a 7.8 million dollar grant for studying household income and child development in the first three years of life. The Valhalla Charitable Foundation, the Weitz Family Foundation, and the Chan Zuckerberg Initiative also granted Noble funding supporting the same study on household income and child development in the first three years of life.

== Research ==
Noble's research program focuses on associations between socioeconomic disparities and cognitive development from infancy to childhood and adolescence. She and her colleagues examine environmental factors that may influence cognitive development with the aim of informing public health interventions to support cognitive development of children growing up in low-income families.

One of her most well-known studies is the Baby's First Years study, which is a randomized control trial aimed to reduce poverty. This study assesses how socioeconomic inequality is related to children's brain development, the time course of emerging disparities (e.g., how early are socioeconomic disparities in cognition and the brain detected?), what the underlying mediating factors are that explain these links, and in particular how these underlying factors are modifiable. This work is leading our understanding of how socioeconomic disparities influence cognitive, emotional and brain development in children during their first three years of life. Noble and colleagues research the impact of unconditional cash transfers on behavioral changes of low-income families in terms of maternal substance use, how maternal stress is linked with lower reports of children's socioemotional and language development, and how cash transfers impact infant brain activity.

Noble also worked on the Building Understanding of Developmental Differences across Years (BUDDY) study, the Baby Behavior, Language, and EEG (BabBLE) study, and the MRI Study of Children's Cognitive and Brain Development. One of her studies examining neuro-cognitive correlates of socioeconomic status in kindergarten children reported differences in activity in the left perisylvian/language system and the prefrontal executive system related to socioeconomic status. Another paper explored family income, parental education and brain structure in children and adolescents and found income to be logarithmically associated with brain surface area, meaning that for lower income families, small differences in income related to large differences in surface area, while for higher income families, small differences in income were related to smaller differences in surface area. Noble's work has helped us to better understand how children's brains develop in relation to their environment, specifically in how neurological development relates to socioeconomic status. Her influential research continues to help aid in public policy decisions and interventions for familial financial support.

== Awards ==
Noble was honored by receiving the American Psychological Association's Distinguished Contributions to Psychology in the Public Interest Award (Senior Career) in 2021. She previously received the Janet Taylor Spence Award for Transformative Early Career Contributions from the Association for Psychological Science in 2017. Noble is an elected fellow of the Association for Psychological Science.

Other awards and honors include:

- John Wiley Distinguished Speaker Award, International Society for Developmental Psychobiology (2020)
- American Psychological Association featured scientist, #ThankAScientist campaign (2017)
- Association for Psychological Science "Rising Star" (2011)

== Selected publications ==
- Noble, K. G., Houston, S. M., Brito, N. H., Bartsch, H., Kan, E., Kuperman, J. M., ... & Sowell, E. R. (2015). Family income, parental education and brain structure in children and adolescents. Nature Neuroscience, 18(5), 773–778.
- Noble, K. G., Houston, S. M., Kan, E., & Sowell, E. R. (2012). Neural correlates of socioeconomic status in the developing human brain. Developmental Science, 15(4), 516–527.
- Noble, K. G., McCandliss, B. D., & Farah, M. J. (2007). Socioeconomic gradients predict individual differences in neurocognitive abilities. Developmental Science, 10(4), 464–480.
- Noble, K. G., Norman, M. F., & Farah, M. J. (2005). Neurocognitive correlates of socioeconomic status in kindergarten children. Developmental Science, 8(1), 74–87.
- Noble, K. G., Wolmetz, M. E., Ochs, L. G., Farah, M. J., & McCandliss, B. D. (2006). Brain–behavior relationships in reading acquisition are modulated by socioeconomic factors. Developmental Science, 9(6), 642–654.
