= Mary Fernández =

American computer scientist and activist

- Born: New York
- Education: Brown University (B.S., M.S.); Princeton University (Ph.D.)
- Occupation: President of MentorNet

Mary Fernández is an American computer scientist and activist for women and minorities in science, technology, engineering, and mathematics (STEM). She is the CEO of MentorNet, a not-for-profit online organization that helps mentors and students in STEM develop mentoring relationships that enable students to gain insight on how to set and reach their academic goals and prepare for potential internships that align with their careers.

== Education ==
Fernández enrolled in the engineering department at Brown University in the early 1980s. After taking an introductory computer science course taught by Andries van Dam, she changed her major to computer science. She earned her bachelor's and master's degrees from Brown, and her Ph.D. from Princeton University in 1995. While pursuing her degree at Princeton and before she became the CEO of MentorNet years later, Fernández sought mentoring from Brian Kernighan *69, today a Princeton professor as she struggled to adapt to her environment at Princeton. As a female minority and first-generation student the struggle to maintain and accomplish a career in STEM, especially a male-dominated field, Fernández was able to achieve her goals with her mentor and inspired her to mentor for MentorNET when it was founded in 1997.

== Career ==
Fernández joined AT&T as a senior technical staff member in 1995. She worked there for seventeen years, ending her career as the Assistant Vice President of Information and Software Systems Research. During her time there, she worked on technology to handle semi-structured XML, particularly the XQuery language.

In 1998, Fernández joined MentorNet, an organization that matches mentors with STEM students and helps them develop mentoring relationships. She joined the board of directors of the organization in 2009, becoming the board chair in 2011. In 2013 she became CEO, and she transitioned to president in 2014 when MentorNet became a division of the Great Minds in STEM non-profit.

Fernández served as the secretary and treasurer of ACM SIGMOD, and was the associate editor of ACM Transactions on Database Systems. She serves on the board of the Computing Research Association. In 2011, Fernández was awarded the Great Minds in STEM Technical Achievement in Industry Award.
