= Maxine Weinstein =

American academic

Maxine A. Weinstein is a Distinguished Professor of Population and Health at Georgetown University's Graduate School of Arts and Sciences.

== Education ==
Weinstein received a bachelor's in mathematics from Antioch College in 1969 and master's (1979) and PhD (1981) in sociology from Princeton University.

== Career ==
Weinstein taught as an assistant professor at Columbia University in 1981 and 1982, worked at AT&T from 1982 to 1984, was a Mellon Fellow at the University of Michigan from 1984 through 1987, and started teaching at Georgetown University in 1987 as an assistant professor. In 1992 she became an associate professor and in 1999 was named distinguished professor. She is the director of Georgetown's Center for Population and Health.

In 2015 Weinstein was awarded Georgetown's Career Research Achievement Award. A book in which she authored two chapters, Social Change and the Family in Taiwan, won a Goode Distinguished Book Award and an Otis Dudley Duncan Award for Distinguished Scholarship in Social Demography from the American Sociological Association.

== Research interests ==
Weinstein's research interests focus on the behavioral and biological aspects of aging and aging populations. She has received multiple grants from the National Institute on Aging, as of 2015 totalling $20 million, and an $8.2 million award in 2023.
