= Nabila El-Bassel =

American academic

- Occupation: Professor
- Known for: Opioid abuse and treatment research
- Title: Willma and Albert Musher Professor of Social Work and University Professor at Columbia University

Academic background
- Education: Tel Aviv University, Hebrew University, Columbia University School of Social Work

Academic work
- Discipline: Social Work
- Sub-discipline: opioid abuse, disorders and treatment
- Institutions: Columbia University School of Social Work
- Main interests: The interactions between substance abuse and marginalized communities.

Nabila El-Bassel is an American scholar who is notable for her research into the interaction between substance abuse and marginalized communities. She is the Willma and Albert Musher Professor of Social Work and a university professor at Columbia University and director of the Social Intervention Group, which she co-founded in 1990.

== Career ==
El-Bassel earned her Bachelor's of Social Work at Tel Aviv University, her Masters of Social Work at the School of Social Work and Social Welfare at the Hebrew University in Jerusalem, and her PhD at the Columbia University School of Social Work. Her position as 'University professor' is a substantial honor by the university, since only eight professors may hold this position in the university at only one time, and it is awarded by the school's Board of Trustees. Her research has focused on the prevention of HIV and AIDS, as well as violence against marginalized communities and substance abuse. In 2019, she led an $86 million program to reduce opioid deaths by improving education about their dangers, expanding medical treatment in detention centers and homeless shelters and training medical practitioners to better understand the disorder.
