= Shivaram Rajgopal =

Indian-American academic

- Education: University of Bombay (BCom); University of Iowa (Ph.D.)
- Scientific career
- Fields: Accounting
- Workplaces: Duke University; Emory University; University of Washington; Columbia University
- Website: www.shivarajgopal.com

Shivaram Rajgopal is an Indian-American academic. He is currently the Kester and Byrnes Professor of Accounting and Auditing at Columbia University, where he served as Vice Dean of Research from 2017 to 2019. Previously, he was a faculty member at Duke University, Emory University, and the University of Washington. Professor Rajgopal is a Chartered Accountant from India and got his Ph.D. from the University of Iowa.

== Research and teaching ==
Professor Rajgopal’s research interests span financial reporting, earnings quality, fraud, executive compensation and corporate culture. His work has been published in journals such as The Accounting Review, the Journal of Accounting and Economics, the Journal of Accounting Research, Review of Accounting Studies, the Journal of Finance or the Journal of Financial Economics. His research is frequently cited in the popular press, including The Wall Street Journal The New York Times, Financial Times, Bloomberg and Reuters. He teaches MBA classes in sovereign financial statements, fundamental analysis of sustainability of businesses, and offers doctoral seminars in various topics in accounting literature. He is the Faculty Director of the Corporate Governance Program at Columbia Business School.

== Awards ==
- Notable Contribution to Accounting Literature awarded by the American Accounting Association (AAA), 2006, 2016, 2018
- Graham and Dodd Scroll Prize given by the Financial Analysts Journal, 2006, 2016
- Glen McLaughlin Award for Research in Accounting Ethics, 2008, 2012, 2015
- MBA Professor of the Year Award, 2006
