= Geronimo B. de los Reyes Jr. =

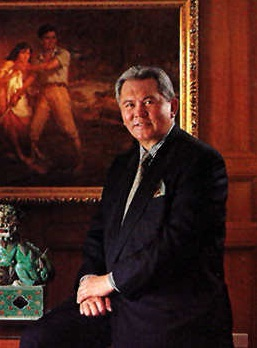
Geronimo Berenguer de los Reyes Jr., Filipino entrepreneur, guardian of historical records and philanthropy

Geronimo Berenguer de los Reyes Jr. (April 16, 1936 – October 24, 2020) was a Filipino entrepreneur, philanthropist, and art collector. He was the chairman of Gateway Business Park in Cavite. Established in 1990, the park houses Philippine-based industrial companies.

He was educated at Colegio de San Juan de Letran.

== Early life ==
Geronimo B. de los Reyes Jr. was the son of a well-known builder and entrepreneur. His father is known to have owned the old Geronimo de los Reyes Building in Manila, which was designed by Juan F. Nakpil. However, in the advent of World War II, the family fortune was wiped out and at the young age of ten, de los Reyes, along with his brothers, had to fend for themselves.

At 19, de los Reyes was first employed by Pan American World Airlines, an international airline. He worked irregular hours, carried baggage and cargo, and slept on a cardboard mat on the floor of the office for years, at the old airport in Paranaque. His life would change on June 1, 1958, when he was able to demonstrate his professional abilities at a time of crisis. The Pan Am Clipper, Golden Gate Flight 439, N1023V crashed on landing in Manila during a rain storm. Mr. de los Reyes was the first ramp person to enter the plane and assist with the evacuation of the passengers. He also took care of their needs while they waited for emergency services that were delayed by the rain. He was commended for his work and was invited to New York to meet with Juan Trippe. This recognition of his hard work and persistence, led to the company granting him favorable hours, allowing him to take evening classes to finish college.

After graduating magna cum laude in Management and Finance, de los Reyes headed the Sales and Architectural/Building Division of Reynolds Aluminum. He was sent to US by the company for further studies.

== Business and acquisitions ==
De los Reyes acquired 12 corporations involved in the trading and supply of building products, hardware, and accessories. He has ventured into land development, construction of condominium apartments and the Gateway Business Park, an industrial estate in Cavite. GBP is Cavite's premier industrial park, on 180 hectares in General Trias.

De los Reyes' real estate and construction achievements include the Pacific Plaza high-rise building in Ayala Avenue in Makati, and dozens of edifices, as well as the Gateway Business and Industrial Park.

== Philanthropy ==
A main beneficiary of his philanthropy has been the Geronimo B. de los Reyes Foundation, Inc., which promotes education by providing scholarships for poor children. The foundation also supports faculty development and research studies on the graduate school level. The foundation assists in preserving the environment through a centralized waste water plant at GBP, and conducts seminars on environmental care.

De los Reyes was an Outstanding Manilan awardee in 2012. Former Manila Mayor Alfredo Lim awarded him as the Guardian of Historical Records and Philanthropy.

== Geronimo B. de los Reyes Jr. Museum ==
In September 1996, de los Reyes opened a museum with photographs of the Philippine Revolution, the Filipino-American War, and the Philippines at the turn of the century. The Geronimo Berenguer de los Reyes Jr. Museum, located at the Gateway Business Park in General Trias, showcases the Philippine heritage. The museum also houses the archives of history with presentation of Philippine antiquarium, 19th and 20th century photographs, including the most dramatic image taken during the execution of Dr. Jose P. Rizal in Bagumbayan (now Rizal Park) in Manila.

The GBR Museum book collection and 1,809 woodcut prints include a 15th-century illustration of Jerusalem. It also houses an antique map collection housed in a pavilion, which includes maps drawn by historic cartographers such as Ortelius, Hondius, Bleau and Dudley. The first map exclusively of the Philippines, made by Petrus Kaerius in 1598, is displayed alongside the most famous Philippine map, that of Pedro Murillo Velardo, with its illustrated border panels depicting native life, customs, flora and fauna (1734).

== The Parish of Our Lady of Guadalupe ==
In December 2007, the Parish of Our Lady of Guadalupe opened in Javalera, General Trias. The parish, which was made possible by de los Reyes, was patterned after the Basilica of Our Lady of Guadalupe at the hills of Guadalupe in Mexico. It has a 1,600 square-meter floor area and can sit 800 people. In the same year after its completion, de los Reyes donated the parish to the diocese.
