= Anne Marie Albano =

Clinical psychologist

- Citizenship: United States and Italy
- Occupation: CUCARD Professor of Medical Psychology in Psychiatry
- Spouse: Mark Olfson, MD, MPH
- Awards: 2015 Association for Behavioral and Cognitive Therapies - Outstanding Contribution by an Individual for Clinical Activities

Academic background
- Education: University of Mississippi, University of Richmond, Florida State University

Anne Marie Albano is a clinical psychologist known for her clinical work and research on psychosocial treatments for anxiety and mood disorders, and the impact of these disorders on the developing youth. She is the CUCARD professor of medical psychology in psychiatry at Columbia University, the founding director of the Columbia University Clinic for Anxiety and Related Disorders (CUCARD), and the clinical site director at CUCARD of the New York Presbyterian Hospital's Youth Anxiety Center.

== Awards ==
In 2021 the Trustees of Columbia University bestowed on Albano the inaugural Columbia University Clinic for Anxiety and Related Disorders (CUCARD) Professorhip. At a future time when Dr. Albano shall no longer be a faculty, this professorship shall be known as the Anne Marie Albano, Ph.D. Professorship of Anxiety and Related Disorders in the Department of Psychiatry. Albano received the 2015 Outstanding Contribution by an Individual for Clinical Activities award from the Association for Behavioral and Cognitive Therapies for her contributions to clinical work in cognitive and behavioral modalities. She was a 2014 Fellow in the Association for Behavioral and Cognitive Therapies, and was also honored in 2013 as a Fellow in the Society for Clinical Psychology (Division 12) of the American Psychological Association. The Association for Behavioral and Cognitive Therapies named an award in her honor (Anne Marie Albano Early Career Award for Excellence in the Integration of Science and Practice) for her devotion to studying and treating anxiety and mood disorders in children, adolescents, and young adults.

== Biography ==
Anne Marie Albano was born in Staten Island, New York. She received her associate degree from Broward Community College in 1976, and her Bachelor of Science degree in psychology from Florida State University in 1979. Albano obtained a master's degree in experimental psychology from the University of Richmond in 1983 under the mentorship of Bernard A. Chirco. Albano then worked as a therapist for Adolescents in Distress in Fort Lauderdale, Florida, and a psychologist for the Child Protection Team in Broward County in 1983, before becoming a family therapist for Kids in Distress in 1984. Albano received her PhD in clinical psychology from the University of Mississippi in 1991. Her unpublished dissertation was on the assessment of anger in children using multi trait-multi method methodology and validation of a cognitive assessment method, under the mentorship of Karen A. Christoff. After her predoctoral internship at the Boston VA Medical Center/Tufts University Clinical Psychology Consortium, she then completed her postdoctoral fellowship in the Center for Stress and Anxiety Disorders at SUNY Albany in 1992 under the mentorship of David H. Barlow, Ph.D.

In 1999, Albano became a founding Fellow of the Academy of Cognitive Therapy. She was honored as the Beck Institute Scholar in Cognitive Therapy and Research in 2001. Since 2004, Albano is an attending psychologist of the Department of Child and Adolescent Psychiatry at the New York Presbyterian Hospital. In 2005, Albano became a Fellow of the American Academy of Clinical Child and Adolescent Psychology. In 2008, Albano received the Rosenberry Award in Behavioral Sciences for her service to children, adolescents and families by the Children's Hospital of the University of Colorado.

Albano served as the president of the Association of Behavioral and Cognitive Therapies from 2008 to 2009. In 2009, Albano was invited to give a keynote address at the British Association for Behavioral and Cognitive Therapies. In 2010, Albano gave the eighth annual lecture at the Todd Ouida Children's Foundation's Annual Lecture at the University of Michigan. In 2012, Albano was invited to be the first Manghi Memorial Lecturer at the Adler School of Professional Psychology in honor of Elina Manghi, a clinical psychologist who worked with children and adolescents. From 2011 to 2012, Albano served as the president of the Society of Clinical Child and Adolescent Psychology (Division 53) of the APA. She served on the board of directors for the Anxiety and Depression Association of America from 2014 to 2017. She became a professor of medical psychology at the Columbia University Medical Center in 2015.

Albano held various editorial positions for journals including inaugural editor of Evidence-based Practice in Child and Adolescent Mental Health (2016-2020), editor of Cognitive and Behavioral Practice (2001-2005), associate editor of Journal of Consulting and Clinical Psychology (2010–2015), and is the co-editor with David H. Barlow of the Oxford University Press treatment manual series Programs that Work (2007–present). Since 2007, Albano also serves on the scientific advisory board for the Treatments that Work Series published by Oxford Press (edited by David H. Barlow).

Albano is an advocate for mental health awareness. She serves on the Scientific Advisory Board of the Jed Foundation. She and her colleague, Simon Rego hosted the #ADAATalksSuicide Twitter chat on July 11, 2018, where they answered questions related to suicide warning signs and how to talk about suicide with others.

== Research ==
Anne Marie Albano's research focuses on anxiety and mood disorders. She aims to raise awareness about the importance of children's mental health and how positive mental health is essential to a child's healthy development. With the support of David Shaffer, MD, FRCP, then Chairman of the Division of Child and Adolescent Psychiatry at Columbia University College of Physicians and Surgeons, Albano founded the Columbia University Clinic for Anxiety and Related Disorders (CUCARD), an evidence-based treatment clinic that provide cognitive behavioral therapy for patients with anxiety and mood disorders. Albano was the primary investigator for two National Institute of Mental Health funded clinical studies, The Child/Adolescent Anxiety Multimodal Study (CAMS) and the Treatments for Adolescents with Depression Study (TADS), that examined the benefits of cognitive behavioral therapy, medication, and the combination of both for treating children and adolescents with anxiety and related disorders. At CUCARD, Albano's team, led by then postdoctoral fellows Jonathan S. Comer and Anthony C. Puliafico, developed "CALM: Coaching Approach Behavior and Leading through Modeling" for families with children between ages 3 to 8 to help children overcome situations that causes them distress. Another treatment that Albano and her team developed is "LEAP: Launching Emerging Adults Program" which focuses on helping individuals overcome anxiety during the transition to adulthood.

== Books ==
- Albano, A. M., & DiBartolo, P. M. (2007). Cognitive-behavioral therapy for social phobia in adolescents: Stand up, speak out. Oxford University Press.
- Albano, A. M., & Pepper, L. (2013). You and your anxious child: Free your child from fears and worries and create a joyful family life. Avery.
- Kearney, C. A., & Albano, A. M. (2018). When children refuse school: Therapist guide. Oxford University Press.
- Silverman, W. K., & Albano, A. M. (1996). Anxiety disorders interview schedule for DSM-IV: Child version. Oxford University Press.
- Albano, A.M., & Silverman, W. K. (in press). Anxiety and related disorders interview schedule for DSM-5, Child and Parent Versions. Oxford University Press.

Albano has written several books including You and Your Anxious Child: Free Your Child from Fears and Worries and Create a Joyful Family Life (2013) with Leslie Pepper, which focuses on case studies about children with anxiety. This book received the 2014 Self-Help Book Award from the American Society of Journalists and Authors, and the 2014 Self-Help Book Seal of Merit from the Association for Behavioral and Cognitive Therapies.

She wrote Anxiety Disorders Interview Schedule (ADIS‑IV) Child/Parent in 1996 with Wendy K. Silverman to help clinicians diagnose children with emotional disorders. She co-authored Cognitive-Behavioral Therapy for Social Phobia in Adolescents: Stand Up, Speak Out with Patricia Marten DiBartolo in 2007. This book focuses on techniques used to help adolescents with social anxiety and extensive shyness learn to cope with their social situations. When Children Refuse School: Parent Workbook, co-authored by Albano and Christopher A. Kearney in 2018, is designed to help parents who have children with school refusal behavior work with qualified therapists to defuse the situation at hand.
