= Robert S. Neuwirth =

American physician and inventor (1933–2013)

- Born: July 11, 1933; Floral Park, New York, U.S.
- Died: December 17, 2013 (aged 80); Newark, New Jersey, U.S.
- Education: Yale University, Yale School of Medicine, Columbia Presbyterian Medical Center, Sewanhaka High School
- Known for: Innovations in minimally invasive gynecologic endoscopy and women's reproductive health, real estate
- Children: Five, including Jessica Neuwirth
- Relatives: Lucien Neuwirth

Robert S. Neuwirth (July 11, 1933 – December 17, 2013) was an American physician, inventor, and real estate developer. Neuwirth devoted his career to crafting and refining noninvasive practices promoting women's health. He was one of the first doctors to employ endoscopy in gynecological practice, in which a small optical instrument called an endoscope is used to examine areas tucked deep into the body. He is known as the first doctor to introduce laparoscopy to the United States, in 1968.

Neuwrith is also known for his work in the medical device industry and sold several of his patents, primarily to Johnson & Johnson, between 1994 and 2003.

From 1974 to 1991, Neuwirth acted as chairman of the Department of Obstetrics and Gynecology at St. Lukes-Roosevelt Hospital in Manhattan, at which time he published a critical analysis of the gynecological uses of hysteroscopy. In 1977 he was appointed as the first Babcock Professor of Obstetrics and Gynecology at Columbia University. During that tenure, he served as an examiner for the American Board of Obstetrics and Gynecology from 1982 to 1998.

Neuwirth contributed to at least 55 medical journals and publications in his lifetime.

== Gynecologic endoscopy ==
One of Neuwirth's greatest priorities was lessening the need for hysterectomy, a common gynecological surgical procedure that removes the uterus while often posing significant risks of infection and other severe complications.

The surgical discipline of gynecological endoscopy, which Neuwirth pioneered, utilizes optical instruments to help diagnose common female-specific disorders and pathologies, including but not limited to infertility and vaginal hemorrhaging. Gynecological endoscopy is performed using at least one of two methods: hysteroscopy and laparoscopy.

Neuwirth is credited as the first doctor to introduce laparoscopy to the United States in 1968, authoring several research articles on laparoscopic sterilization and ovarian biopsies. In 1969 he introduced hysteroscopy to the American gynecological community and authored a monograph on the technique in 1974. In 1976, Neuwirth developed resectoscopic surgery of submucous fibroids, arguably the most important development in modern gynecology. The technique enabled doctors to minimize uterine perforation.

In 1992, Neuwirth authored the first report on long-term outcome of menstrual function following hysteroscopic endometrial ablation, a treatment for abnormal uterine bleeding. He is also the inventor of balloon endometrial ablation.

== Selected works ==
- Hysteroscopy (Major problems in obstetrics and gynecology), 1975
