= Reyes =

Reyes (Spanish, 'kings') may refer to:

- Reyes (name), including a list of people and fictional characters
- Reyes, Bolivia, city capital of the José Ballivián Province in the Beni Department
- Reyes rendering, a computer software architecture
- Point Reyes, a prominent cape on the Pacific coast of northern California, U.S.
- Reyes, a name for Epiphany (holiday)
- Reyes Holdings, an American food manufacturer

== See also ==
- De los Reyes (disambiguation)
- Ríos (disambiguation)
- Reye syndrome, a brain disease
