= Donald Dewey =

American economist

Donald Jefferson Dewey (March 27, 1922 – March 4, 2002) was a professor of economics at Duke University and Columbia University.

Dewey was best known for his antitrust studies and his work on industrial organization. His books included Monopoly in Economics and Law, Modern Capital Theory, The Theory of Imperfect Competition, Microeconomics, and The Antitrust Experiment 1890-1990. He also published thirty articles and about seventy-five book reviews.

Dewey was born in Solon, Ohio. His father, Ralph Dewey (1901–1959), was professor of economics and department chair at the Ohio State University. A graduate of the University of Chicago (A.B., 1943) and the University of Iowa (M.A., 1947), Donald Dewey's education was interrupted by service in the United States Army during World War II. After the war, he did additional graduate work at Cambridge University, the London School of Economics, and Chicago before joining the faculty of Duke University in 1950. He moved to Columbia in 1960, where he remained until he reached mandatory retirement age in 1992. He served as department chair in economics at Columbia from 1973 to 1976.

He died in Hastings-on-Hudson, New York, in 2002.
