= Journal of Clinical Child & Adolescent Psychology =

Peer-reviewed psychology journal

- Discipline: Child psychology, clinical psychology
- Language: English
- Edited by: Andres De Los Reyes

Publication details
- Former name: Journal of Clinical Child Psychology
- History: 1971-present
- Publisher: Routledge
- Frequency: Bimonthly
- Impact factor: 5.014 (2017)

Standard abbreviations
- ISO 4: J. Clin. Child Adolesc. Psychol.

Indexing
- ISSN: 1537-4416 (print); 1537-4424 (web)
- LCCN: 2001215752
- OCLC no.: 697762617

Links
- Journal homepage; Online access; Online archive

The Journal of Clinical Child & Adolescent Psychology is a bimonthly peer-reviewed journal covering child and adolescent mental health. It was established in 1971 as the Journal of Clinical Child Psychology, obtaining its current name in 2001. It is published by Routledge on behalf of the American Psychological Association's Division 53, the Society of Clinical Child and Adolescent Psychology. The editor-in-chief is Andres De Los Reyes (University of Maryland at College Park). According to the Journal Citation Reports, the journal has a 2017 impact factor of 5.014, ranking it sixth out of 127 journals in the category "Psychology, Clinical". In 2017, the journal launched the "Future Directions Forum", an annual meeting held in Washington, DC, that profiles content published in the journal's "Future Directions" article series and provides professional development training to early career scientists.
