= International Society for Research in Child and Adolescent Psychopathology =

International psychopathology research organization

- Abbreviation: ISRCAP
- Formation: 1988
- Founder: Herbert C. Quay
- Legal status: 501(c)(3)
- Purpose: Advancing research into psychopathology in children and adolescents
- Headquarters: Illinois
- Members: 320
- President: Amori Yee Mikami
- Secretary/Treasurer: Cynthia Hartung
- Past President: Argyris Stringaris
- President-Elect: N/A
- Publication: Research on Child and Adolescent Psychopathology
- Website: isrcap.org/index.html

The International Society for Research in Child and Adolescent Psychopathology (abbreviated ISRCAP) is an international learned society dedicated to advancing research on causes and treatments for psychopathology among youth.

== History ==
It was established in 1988 by Herbert C. Quay, who published pioneering work on biobehavioral substrates of externalizing behavior and founded the Journal of Abnormal Child Psychology (now Research on Child and Adolescent Psychopathology). It is registered in the United States state of Illinois as a 501(c)(3) non-profit organization.

== Meetings ==
ISRSAP's first meeting was held in Zandvoort, Netherlands, in 1989. It has held biennial meetings in different locations ever since, except during the COVID-19 pandemic. The 21st Biennial conference is in Vancouver, British Columbia June 18-21, 2025.

== Journal ==
Its official peer-reviewed journal is the Research on Child and Adolescent Psychopathology, which is published by Springer Science+Business Media.

== Presidents ==
The president of the ISRCAP is Amori Yee Mikami, Ph.D., whose term runs from 2024 to 2027. The current past president is Argyris Stringaris, M.D. Other past presidents include Theodore Beauchaine, Ph.D., Andrea Chronis-Tuscano, Ph.D., Adrian Angold, MRCPsych, Russell Barkley, Ph.D., Jane Costello, Ph.D., Gabrielle Carlson, M.D., Stephen Hinshaw, Ph.D., Peter S. Jensen, M.D., Kate Keenan, Ph.D., Benjamin Lahey, Ph.D., Joan Luby, M.D., Joel Nigg, Ph.D., William Pelham, Ph.D., Linda Pfiffner, Ph.D., Judith Rapoport, M.D., Sir Michael Rutter, M.D., David Shaffer, M.D., John Weisz, Ph.D., and John Werry, M.D.
