= Marco Tedesco =

Italian climate scientist

- Born: 2 September 1971
- Scientific career
- Institutions: Lamont–Doherty Earth Observatory

Marco Tedesco (born 1971) is an Italian climate scientist at the Lamont–Doherty Earth Observatory at Columbia University.

== Education and career ==
He received his Laurea degree and PhD in Italy, from the University of Naples and the Italian National Research Council. He then spent five years as a postdoc and research scientist at NASA Goddard Space Flight Center and was promoted to Associate Professor in 2012. During his time at CCNY, he founded and directed the Cryosphere Processes Laboratory. In January 2016, he joined Columbia University.

== Research ==
Tedesco's research focuses on the dynamics of seasonal snowpack, ice sheet surface properties and ice dynamics and linkages between surface processes and climate drivers in the polar regions. In 2016 he contributed to the Arctic Report Card.

Tedesco and his research about Greenland's melting ice sheets has been featured in Science. Additionally, Tedesco has served as a subject matter expert about climate change for The Washington Post, The New York Times, Wired, National Public Radio, and more.

== Books ==
- Remote Sensing of the Cryosphere. Hoboken: Wiley (2015). ISBN 978-1-118-36885-5
- The Hidden Life of Ice: Dispatches from a disappearing world. Pub. 2020 by The Experiment ISBN 978-1-615-19699-9 Discusses ice sheets in the arctic regions of Greenland, what the presence of microorganisms tell us about history, the effects of climate change and more.
