= Society for the Scientific Study of Psychopathy =

The Society for the Scientific Study of Psychopathy (abbreviated SSSP) is an international learned society dedicated to promoting and advancing scientific research on the personality disorder psychopathy. It was established in 2005 and held its first meeting that year in Vancouver, British Columbia, Canada. Since then, the society has held biennial conferences to provide a venue for psychopathy researchers to present their most recent findings. As of 2009, the society had over 160 members, most of whom were from the United States.

== Presidents ==
The current president of the SSSP is Adelle Forth. Previous presidents include:

- Joseph P. Newman (2005–2007)
- Paul Frick (2009–2011)
- David S. Kosson (2011–2013)
- Scott Lilienfeld
- Christopher J. Patrick
