= Society of Clinical Child and Adolescent Psychology =

Society of Child Clinical and Adolescent Psychology
- Formation: 1962; 64 years ago
- Founder: Alan O. Ross
- Members: > 5,000
- Website: sccap53.org
- Formerly called: Section 1 of APA Division 12, Clinical Psychology

The Society of Clinical Child and Adolescent Psychology (SCCAP) is an academic and professional society in the United States that was established to encourage the development and advancement of clinical child and adolescent psychology through integration of its scientific and professional aspects.

== Purpose ==
The division promotes scientific inquiry, training, professional practice, and public policy in clinical child and adolescent psychology as a means of improving the welfare and mental health of children, youth, and families. In the service of these goals, SCCAP promotes the general objectives of the American Psychological Association, and is listed as Division 53.

== History ==
The society first appeared in the American Psychological Association as a section under the division of clinical psychology (Division 12) in 1962. As research in child development and behavior analysis progressed, the need for specialized training for clinical psychology students became more urgent.

Conferences were held in the mid-1980s onward to discuss the material needed to treat children. By the next decade, Division 12 considered the possibility of clinical child psychology becoming its own division; and after a vote of the section members, the APA Council created the Division of Clinical Child Psychology (Division 53) in 1999. John Weisz became the first Division President the following year and the division went through a name change the year after that and maintains that title to the present day.

== Past Presidents ==
- 2000 John Weisz
- 2001 Philip Kendall
- 2002 Stephen Hinshaw
- 2003 Thomas Ollendick
- 2004 Benjamin Lahey
- 2005 Stephen Shirk
- 2006 Wendy Silverman
- 2007 Elizabeth McCauley
- 2008 Cheryl King
- 2009 Mary Fristad
- 2010 Anthony Spirito
- 2011 Anne Marie Albano
- 2012 Mary Fristad
- 2013 Marc Atkins
- 2014 Joan Asarnow
- 2015 John Piacentini
- 2016 Eric Youngstrom
- 2017 Mitch Prinstein
- 2018 Steve Lee
- 2019 Eric Youngstrom
- 2020 Steve Hinshaw
- 2021 Michael Southam-Gerow
- 2022 Anna Lau
- 2023 Yo Jackson

== See also ==
- Journal of Clinical Child & Adolescent Psychology
- Divisions of the American Psychological Association
- Association for Psychological Science
