= Culture of California =

The culture of California, also referred to as Californian culture, encompasses various social norms, traditions, and customs in California, including literature, music, visual arts, performing arts, food, sports, religion, law, alongside other beliefs and cultural expressions. Californian culture has been shaped by the history of California, its geography, and various other internal and external factors.

Californian culture is intimately connected to the larger culture of the United States, as well as the cultures of Mexico and Spain, which both ruled California prior to its becoming a part of the United States following the American conquest of California. California is considered an international gateway to the United States and has been heavily influenced by immigration, with the various cultures of Asia and Latin America having left their mark on California's cultural landscape.

In terms of current socio-cultural mores and national politics, Californians are perceived as more liberal than most other Americans living in any other state, especially to those who live in the coastal or northern regions of California. The state, as a whole, is perceived as very liberal, voting for the Democratic Party with supermajorities, although the northeast region (predominantly the area covering the California half of the proposed State of Jefferson) consisting of more rural, mountainous, and inland areas as well as certain parts of the southern coastal region (i.e. Orange County) are conservative. California is also home to prestigious universities including Stanford University, the California Institute of Technology, the University of California, the University of Southern California, and the Claremont Colleges.

== History ==
California was first settled by Indigenous tribes and the names of many cities in California are of Indigenous roots. Spain had explored the present state during the 16th century, although it did not colonize it and did not exert its cultural influence in earnest until the 18th century. By the 19th century, Spain had built missions throughout the state and California consisted of huge land extensions (called "ranchos"). Indigenous cultures, though significantly damaged, survived to some extent by adapting to European influences in the missions. Since then, Hispanic Californians have always been among the largest cultural groups in the state. Furthermore, Mexican immigration into California has also resulted in a large share of cultural contributions, with critics labeling this phenomenon "Mexifornia".

Around the time of California's 1850 statehood, Mexicans and indigenous people were seen somewhat negatively by the incoming American population due to economic competition as well as racist attitudes. The California Gold Rush of the 1850s is now seen as a symbol of California's modern economic style, a pioneering spirit that tends to generate technology, social ventures, entertainment, and economic fads and booms that, in many cases, are followed all around the globe. Southern California, having not experienced the migration boom of the gold rush, became less Americanized than northern California. A growing Asian presence and the advocacy of Black Californians also contributed to a unique Californian cultural and political scene.

California has long been a subject of interest in the public mind and has often been promoted by its boosters as a kind of paradise. In the early 20th century, fueled by the efforts of state and local boosters, many Americans saw the Golden State as an ideal resort destination, sunny and dry year round with easy access to the ocean, deserts, and mountains. In the 1960s, popular music groups such as the Beach Boys promoted the image of Californians as laid-back, tanned beach-goers. The hippie movement began in San Francisco, California in the early 1960s and progressed into the late 1970s.

== Language ==
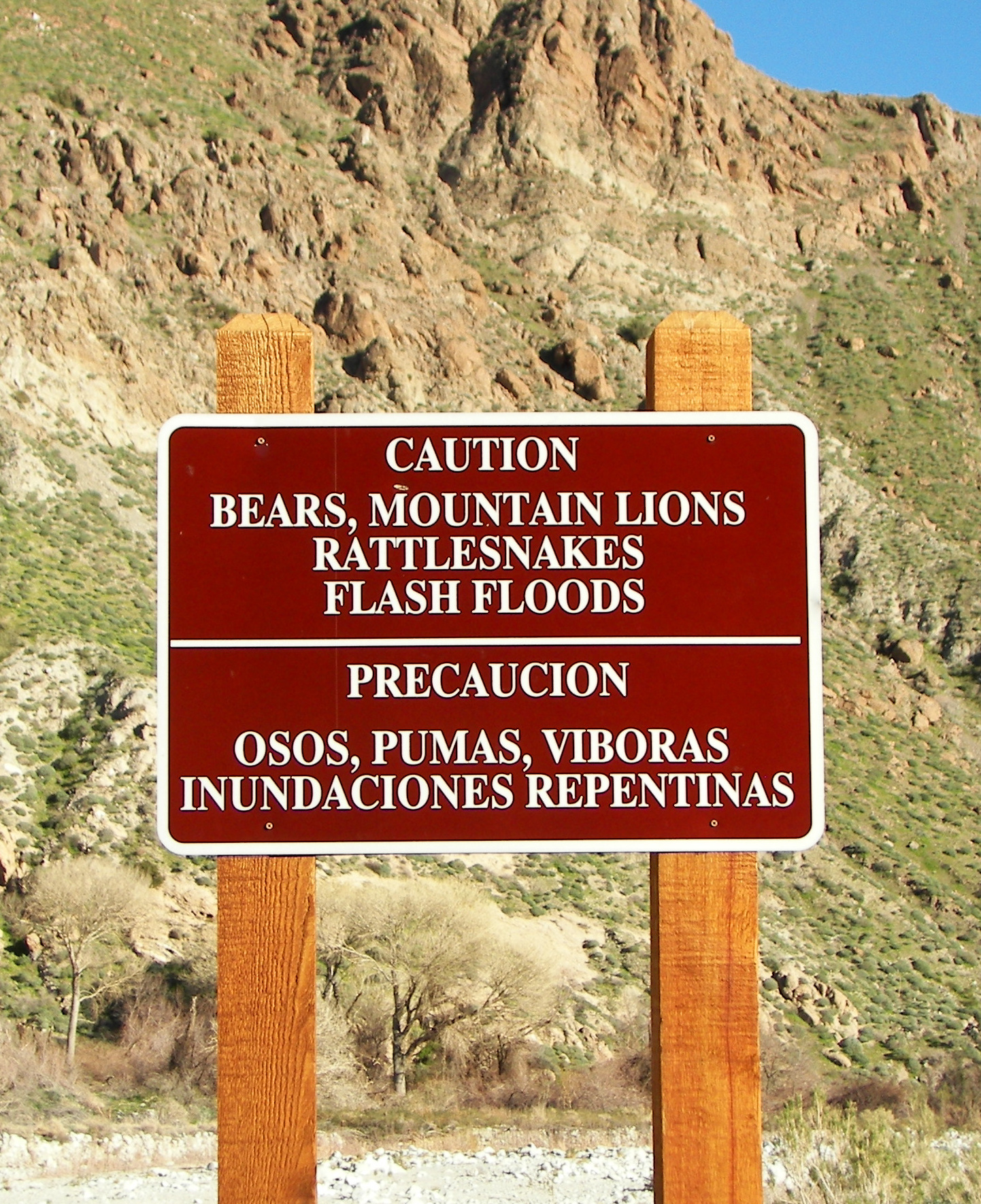
Bilingual English-Spanish sign in the Colorado Desert of Southern California

English is the main language of California's inhabitants. Spanish is a common second language throughout the state. The official language of California has been English since the passage of Proposition 63 in 1986. However, many state, city, and local government agencies print official public documents in Spanish and other languages since Proposition 63 doesn't regulate how governments use other languages. Spanish was the official administrative language in California through the Spanish and Mexican periods until 1848, when Alta California was ceded from Mexico to the United States following the U.S. Conquest of California. Early American governments in California protected the rights of Spanish speakers in the 1849 Constitution of California, but those constitutional protections were removed in 1879.

California English is a dialect of the English language spoken within California. California is the home to a highly diverse populace, and this is reflected in many other languages, especially Spanish. Not all features of California English are used by all speakers in the state, and not all features are restricted in use only to the state. However, there are some linguistic features which can be identified as either originally or predominantly Californian. As the nation's major motion picture and television entertainment center, Hollywood has influenced English throughout the world, by making English speakers of many dialects very visible and by making known new terms and new meanings. The media outlets and entertainment industry based in California also popularizes the California English accent and dialect to the rest of the country and the world.

California was once home to over 300 languages spoken by the Indigenous peoples of California. Most of these languages face extinction and declining speakership in the modern era, owing to centuries of cultural repression and the California genocide. Some indigenous Californian tribes are pursuing language revival policies to increase the number of speakers of their native languages, such as the Yurok language of the Yurok Tribe, California's largest tribe.

The Indigenous Farm worker Study of 2007–2009 found 23 languages of Mexico and Mesoamerica spoken in California.

== Architecture ==
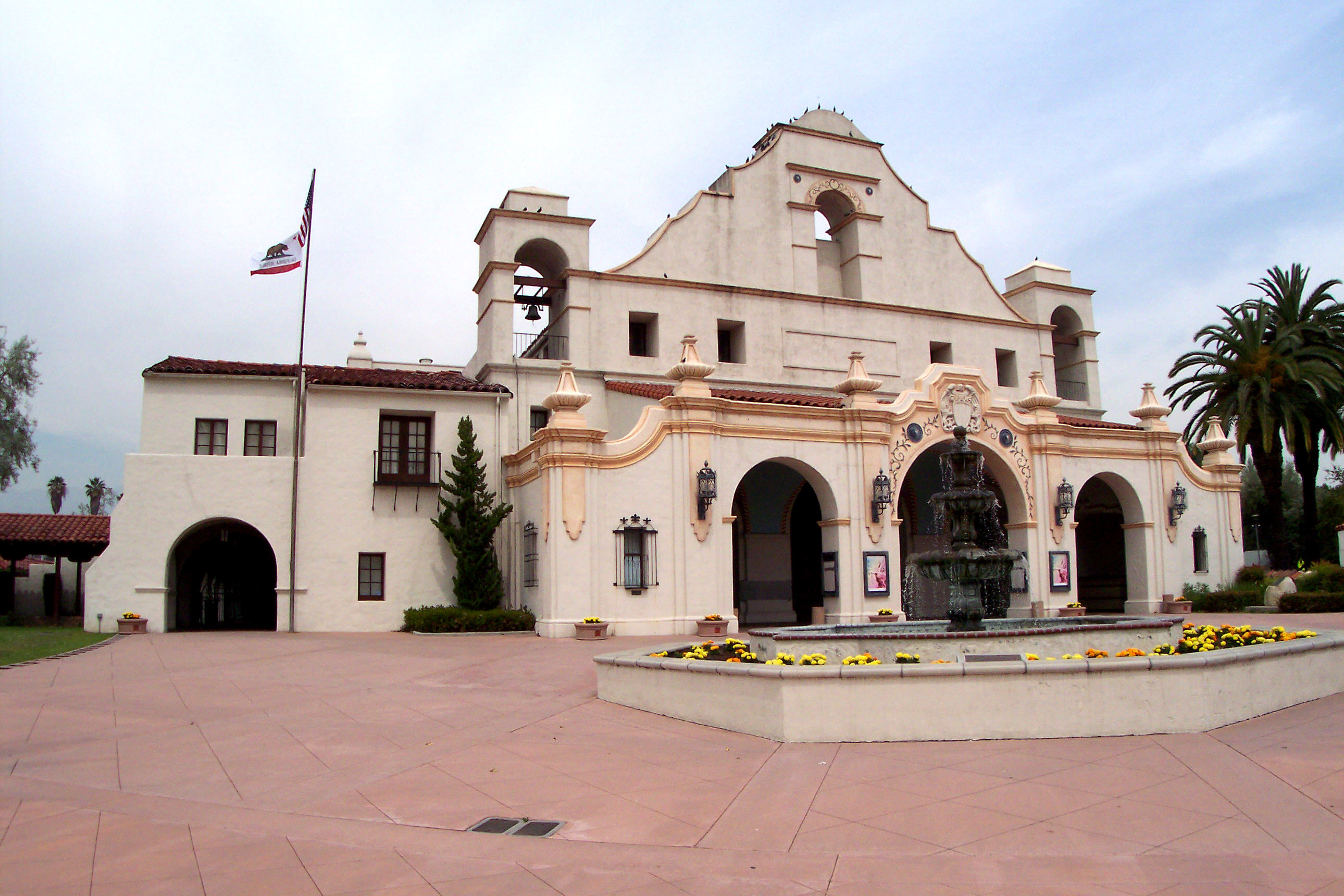
San Gabriel Civic Auditorium, an example of Mission Revival Style architecture

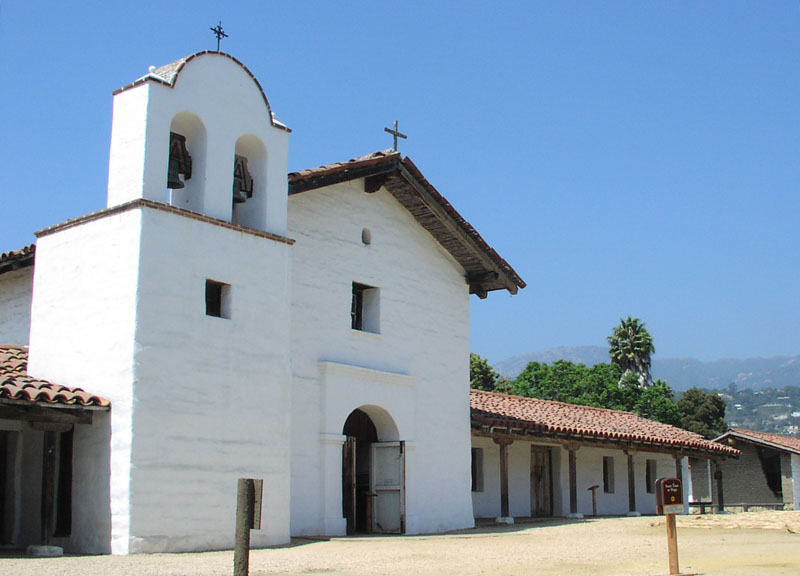
Presidio of Santa Barbara

Apart from the architecture of the California missions and other colonial buildings, there are many architectonic reminiscences of the Spanish period, especially in Southern California, where white stucco walls, red roof tiles, curvilinear gables, arched windows, balconies or even bell towers are incorporated into modern building styles in what is known as the Spanish Colonial Revival architecture, a United States architectural stylistic movement that came about in the early 20th century.

While Spanish architectural styles appear statewide, Northern Californian cities more prominently feature historic Victorian architecture, for which San Francisco is renowned, but which dominates the central historic districts of most Northern California towns. The towns of Eureka and Ferndale, in Humboldt County, are particularly noteworthy for their well-preserved Victorian building stock.

Today's architecture in California is a mixture of many other cultural influences that has resulted in groundbreaking modernist styles that have generated many other interesting and unusual building types.

== Film ==
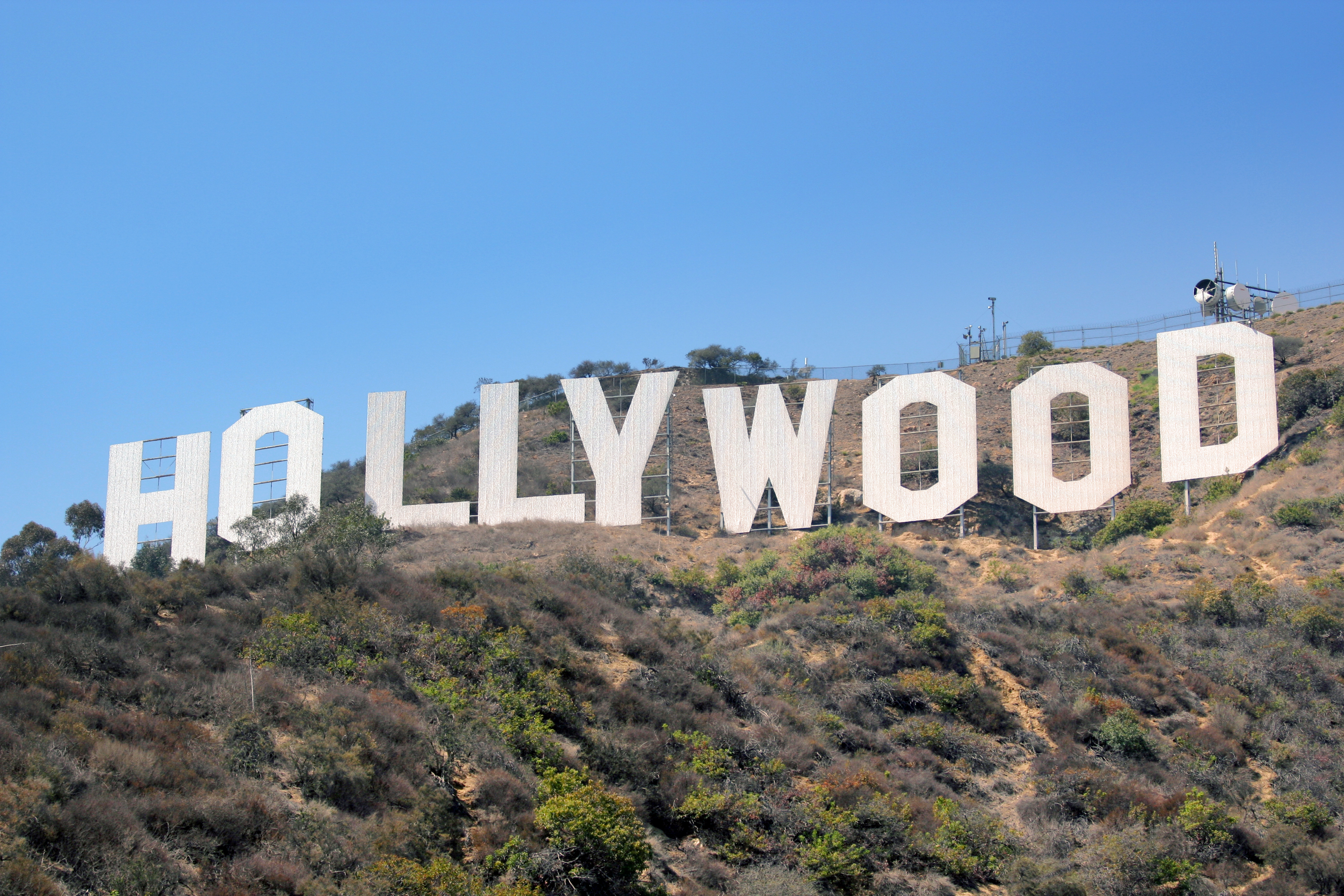
Hollywood sign

California is home to Hollywood (a district of Los Angeles), the center of the American film industry, which has given rise to the popular fashion movie-star image and stereotypical lifestyles such as beach-dwelling surfers.

Hollywood has had a profound effect on culture across the world since the early 20th century. During the so-called Golden Age of Hollywood, which lasted from the end of the silent era in American cinema in the late 1920s to the late 1950s, thousands of movies were released from Hollywood studios. Spectacular epics, which took advantage of new widescreen processes from the 1950s, have become increasingly popular.

Today, in spite of fierce competition from other countries and even other states within the US, California still dominates the industry.

== Music ==
California is the birthplace of several internationally renowned music genres, including:

- Alternative rock/metal, e.g. Beck, Deftones, Hole, Jane's Addiction, Rage Against the Machine, Red Hot Chili Peppers
- Bakersfield sound, e.g. Buck Owens and the Buckaroos, Merle Haggard, Tommy Collins
- Chicano rock, e.g. Carlos Santana, Linda Ronstadt, Los Lobos, Ritchie Valens, Rosie and the Originals, WAR
- Cowpunk, e.g. The Blasters, The Gun Club, Social Distortion, X
- Experimental music, e.g. Beck, Captain Beefheart, Frank Zappa
- Funk rock, e.g. Faith No More, Mr. Bungle, Primus, Red Hot Chili Peppers, WAR
- G-funk, e.g. Dr. Dre, Kendrick Lamar, Snoop Dogg, Warren G
- Hardcore punk, e.g. Adolescents, Black Flag, Circle Jerks, Dead Kennedys
- Hyphy, e.g. Mac Dre, E-40
- Nu metal, e.g. Korn, Papa Roach, P.O.D., Linkin Park
- Paisley Underground
- Psychedelic rock, e.g. The Doors, Grateful Dead, Jefferson Airplane, Moby Grape, Sly and the Family Stone
- Reggae fusion, e.g. Dirty Heads, Iration, Rebelution, Slightly Stoopid, Stick Figure
- Skate punk, e.g. Bad Religion, Blink-182, Descendents, Pennywise, Rancid, Suicidal Tendencies, NOFX, The Offspring
- Soft rock, e.g. The Carpenters, The Doobie Brothers
- Stoner rock, e.g. Sleep, Kyuss
- Surf rock, e.g. The Beach Boys, The Chantays, Dick Dale & The Del Tones, Jan and Dean
- Third wave ska with bands such as No Doubt, Reel Big Fish, Suburban Rhythm, Sublime
- Thrash metal/Bay Area thrash metal, e.g. Exodus, Megadeth, Metallica, Slayer
- West coast blues
- West coast hip hop, e.g. Cypress Hill, E-40, Ice Cube, Kendrick Lamar, Kid Frost, N.W.A., Too Short, Tupac Shakur
- West coast jazz, e.g. Dave Brubeck

Other well-known artists from California from genres which did not necessarily originate in the state include:

- Bolero, e.g. La Santa Cecilia
- Cumbia, e.g. Ozomatli
- Hard rock, e.g. Van Halen
- Heavy metal: Blue Cheer, Guns N' Roses, Van Halen, Mötley Crüe
- Latin rock: Santana, Ritchie Valens
- Mariachi, e.g. Mariachi los Camperos
- Metalcore, e.g. As I Lay Dying, Atreyu, Of Mice & Men, Pierce the Veil, Secrets, A Skylit Drive, Stick to Your Guns, Wovenwar
- Norteño, e.g. Los Tigres del Norte
- Pop, e.g. Tiffany
- Punk, e.g. Dead Kennedys, Circle Jerks, Green Day
- Ranchera, e.g. Ángela Aguilar, Linda Ronstadt
- Rock: Eagles, Counting Crows, Jane's Addiction, Journey, Creedence Clearwater Revival, The Byrds, Rage Against the Machine

Many songs mention California in their title, regardless of whether the band is from California or not. "Hotel California" by the Eagles is by a band from California, in contrast with "California Dreamin'" by The Mamas & the Papas, a band not from California.

== Literature ==
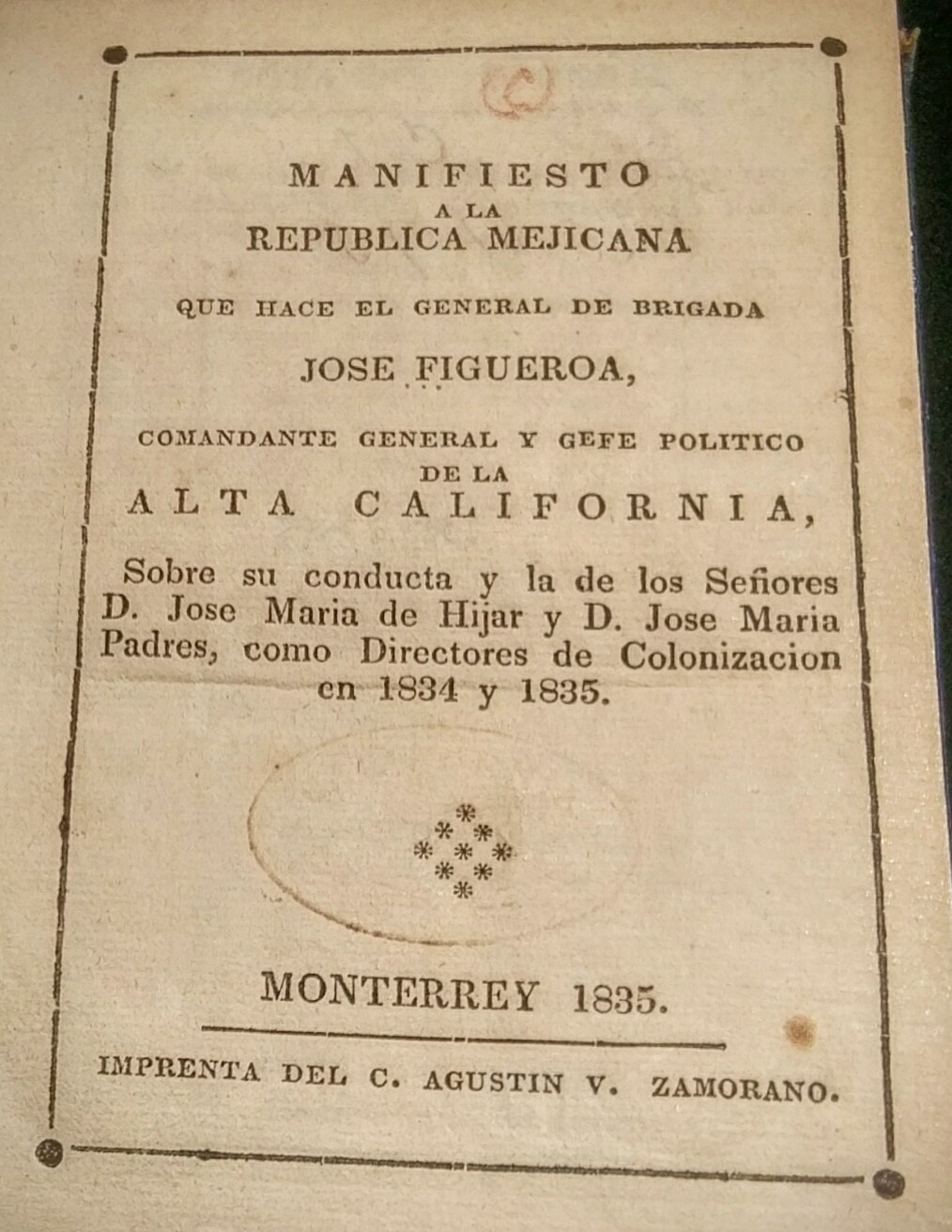
The 1835 Manifiesto a la República Mejicana, by José Figueroa, was the first book published in California.

Notable authors who were either native to California or who wrote extensively about California include:

- Mary Hunter Austin, novelist, poet, critic and playwright; best known for her 1903 nature book The Land of Little Rain, a portrait of the people, flora, fauna and landscapes between the Sierra Nevada and the Mojave Desert
- Richard Brautigan, countercultural novelist, poet and short story writer; poet-in-residence at the California Institute of Technology in 1967
- Charles Bukowski, poet, novelist and short story writer
- Octavia E. Butler, science fiction writer
- James M. Cain, novelist, journalist and screenwriter, widely regarded as a progenitor of the hardboiled school of American crime fiction
- Raymond Chandler, novelist, short story writer and screenwriter; wrote about the darker aspects of mid-20th-century Los Angeles
- Emma Cline, novelist, short story writer and essayist
- Ina Coolbrith, poet and librarian
- Richard Henry Dana Jr., lawyer and politician who recounted aspects of Californio culture which he saw during his 1834 visit as a sailor in his memoir Two Years Before the Mast
- Philip K. Dick, science fiction writer
- Joan Didion, essayist, novelist, screenwriter and journalist; considered one of California's emblematic writers, she wrote extensively about 1960s and 1970s California culture and the state's founding myths
- Bret Easton Ellis, novelist and screenwriter; much of his work is set in Los Angeles
- James Ellroy, crime novelist and essayist; most of his novels are set in Los Angeles
- John Fante, novelist, short story writer and screenwriter of Italian descent
- Robert Frost, poet, born and raised (until age 11) in San Francisco
- Dashiell Hammett, author of hardboiled detective novels and short stories
- Gerald Haslam, novelist, short story writer and essayist; his work is set mainly in the Great Central Valley
- James D. Houston, novelist, poet and editor; his historical novels depict California's early history
- Helen Hunt Jackson, poet and novelist; her 1884 novel Ramona gives a portrayal of Californio culture
- Jack Kerouac, novelist, poet and pioneer of the Beat Generation
- Ken Kesey, countercultural figure and author, best known for his 1962 novel One Flew Over the Cuckoo's Nest
- Frederick Kohner, novelist and screenwriter; his 1957 book Gidget, together with the TV series and movies it inspired, was seminal in the global dissemination of the Southern California beach and surf culture
- Jack London, novelist, journalist and activist
- Ross Macdonald (Ken Millar), crime fiction writer; his post-World War II work helped refine the noir novel in California
- Armistead Maupin, novelist, best known for Tales of the City, a series of novels set in San Francisco
- Carey McWilliams, journalist, author, editor; best known for his writings about California politics and culture, including the condition of migrant farm workers and the internment of Japanese Americans during World War II
- John Muir, naturalist, environmentalist and author; spent several years in the Sierras and brought Yosemite to international prominence
- Frank Norris, journalist and novelist; several of his novels are set in California
- María Ruiz de Burton, the first female Mexican-American author to write in English; wrote The Squatter and the Don under the pen name "C. Loyal"
- Wallace Stegner, novelist, short story writer, environmentalist and historian, known as the "dean of Western writers"
- John Steinbeck, novelist and short story and travel writer; set most of his work in central California, particularly in the Salinas Valley and the Coast Ranges region
- George Sterling, poet and playwright; prominent figure in San Francisco and Carmel-by-the-Sea's bohemian communities in the first quarter of the twentieth century
- Amy Tan, novelist
- Miguel Venegas, Jesuit administrator and historian; published Noticia de la California in 1757, which was subsequently translated into English (1759), Dutch (1761–1762), French (1766–1767) and German (1769–1770), becoming the standard source for information about the early Californias

== Visual arts ==
Several notable art movements have arisen in California. California Impressionism (also called California Plein-Air Painting) arose in the early 20th century as a regional variant of American Impressionism characterized by artists who worked outdoors directly from nature. It influenced the California Scene Painting movement, which flourished from the 1920s to the 1960s.

In the mid-20th century, the Bay Area Figurative Movement rejected the dominant abstract expressionism of the period. In the 1960s and 1970s, the Bay Area was the epicenter of the funk art movement, another figurative movement with an anti-establishment bent.

The Light and Space movement originated in Southern California in the 1960s. It is characterized by a focus on perceptual phenomena, such as in James Turrell's skyspace installations that frame the sky.

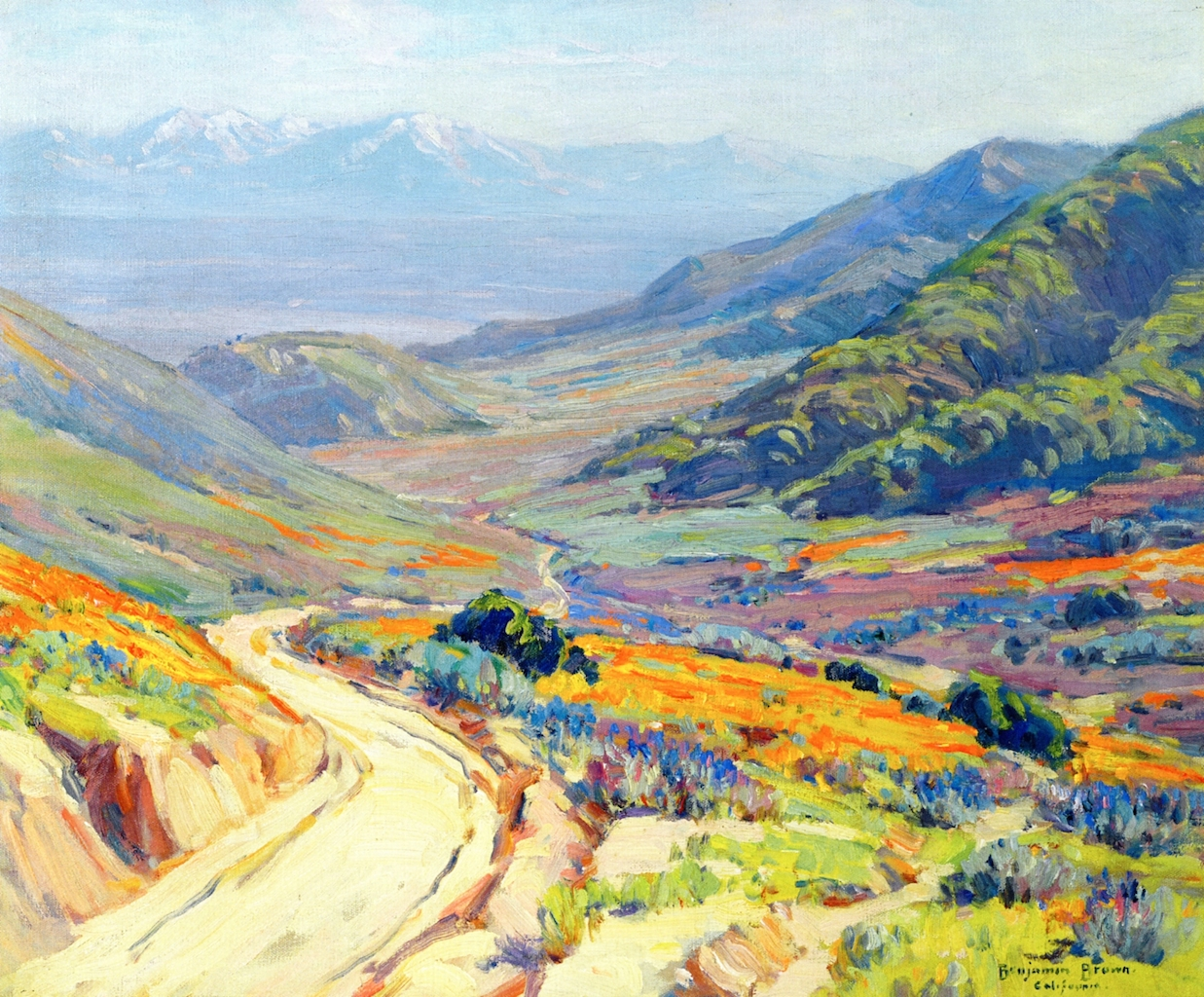
Poppies, Antelope Valley, a California Impressionist painting by Benjamin Chambers Brown

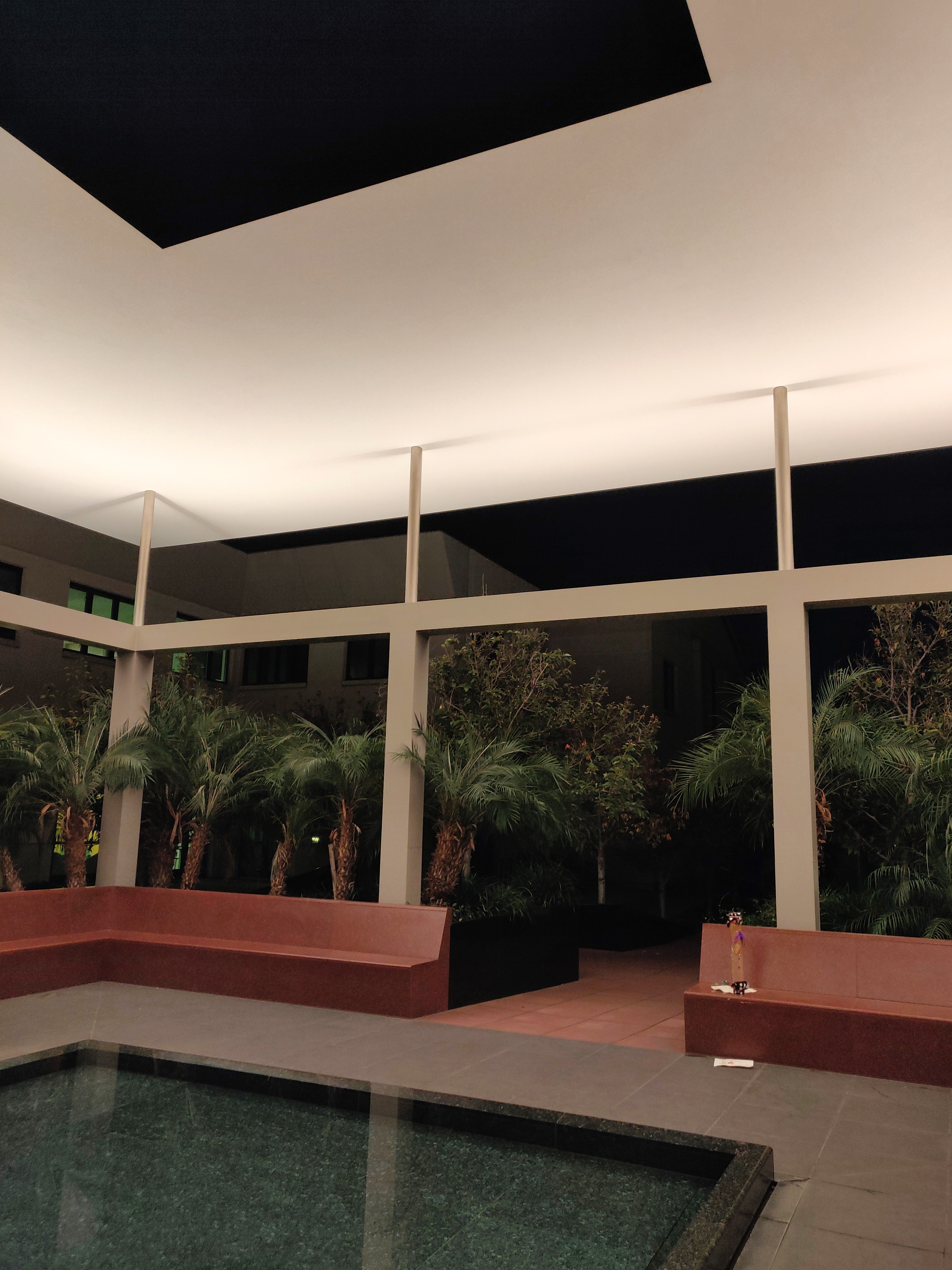
Dividing the Light (2007), a skyspace by James Turrell at Pomona College

== Museums ==
The Getty Villa

California has notable museums:

- The California Museum in the state capitol of Sacramento, California is the official museum of the California State Archives. Originally named the Golden State Museum, it opened in June 1998 under the development of the Secretary of State's office to display contents of the state archives. Soon after her husband Governor Arnold Schwarzenegger was sworn in as governor in 2003, First Lady Maria Shriver began working with the Secretary of State and California State Parks to expand the Museum. In 2006, The California Museum became home to the California Hall of Fame, the most notable and diverse of all The California Museum's permanent exhibits.
- The Oakland Museum of California in Oakland. The Museum is dedicated to the history, natural sciences and art that define the people, history and the future of California.
- The Getty Center in Los Angeles. One of the wealthiest art museums in the world.
- The Getty Villa in Malibu.
- Los Angeles County Museum of Art (LACMA)
- The Museum of Contemporary Art (MOCA) in Los Angeles.
- California Science Center, the West Coast's largest hands-on science center, in Los Angeles.
- The Natural History Museum of Los Angeles County, the largest natural and historical museum in the Western US.
- California Palace of the Legion of Honor in San Francisco. A fine art museum.
- San Francisco Museum of Modern Art in San Francisco.
- The Exploratorium in San Francisco. A hands-on museum of science, art, and human perception.
- California State Railroad Museum in Sacramento. Operated by the California State Parks system, the museum chronicles the history of railroads in California.
- Colton Hall, signing place of The California Constitution.
- California Academy of Sciences in San Francisco. One of the ten largest museums of natural history in the world.

== Cuisine ==
California's many immigrants bring their culinary traditions to the state. Chinese, Mexican, Italian, Vietnamese, and Indian food, as well as many other foreign foods, can be found throughout California. In 1903, The Landmarks Club Cookbook (which was published as a fundraiser to restore California's Spanish missions) claimed that Los Angeles had the most diverse cuisine of any city.

Produce plays an important role in California cuisine. California encompasses many diverse climates and therefore is able to grow many types of produce. Additionally, California's Central Valley contains some of the most fertile soil in the world. California is the number one U.S. producer of many common fruits and vegetables, including broccoli, spinach, tomatoes and avocados, amongst others. A health-conscious culture also contributes to the popularity of fresh produce. Fruit festivals, such as the National Orange Show Festival in San Bernardino County, are common throughout the state.

Avocados play a special role in California cuisine. Many popular California dishes integrate avocados and/or guacamole. Avocados were unfamiliar to most Americans until the mid-20th century, when growers of the subtropical fruit successfully convinced many Americans to try it. In California, avocado is commonly used in sandwiches, hamburgers, salads and even on pizza, in addition to tacos, and other Mexican foods.

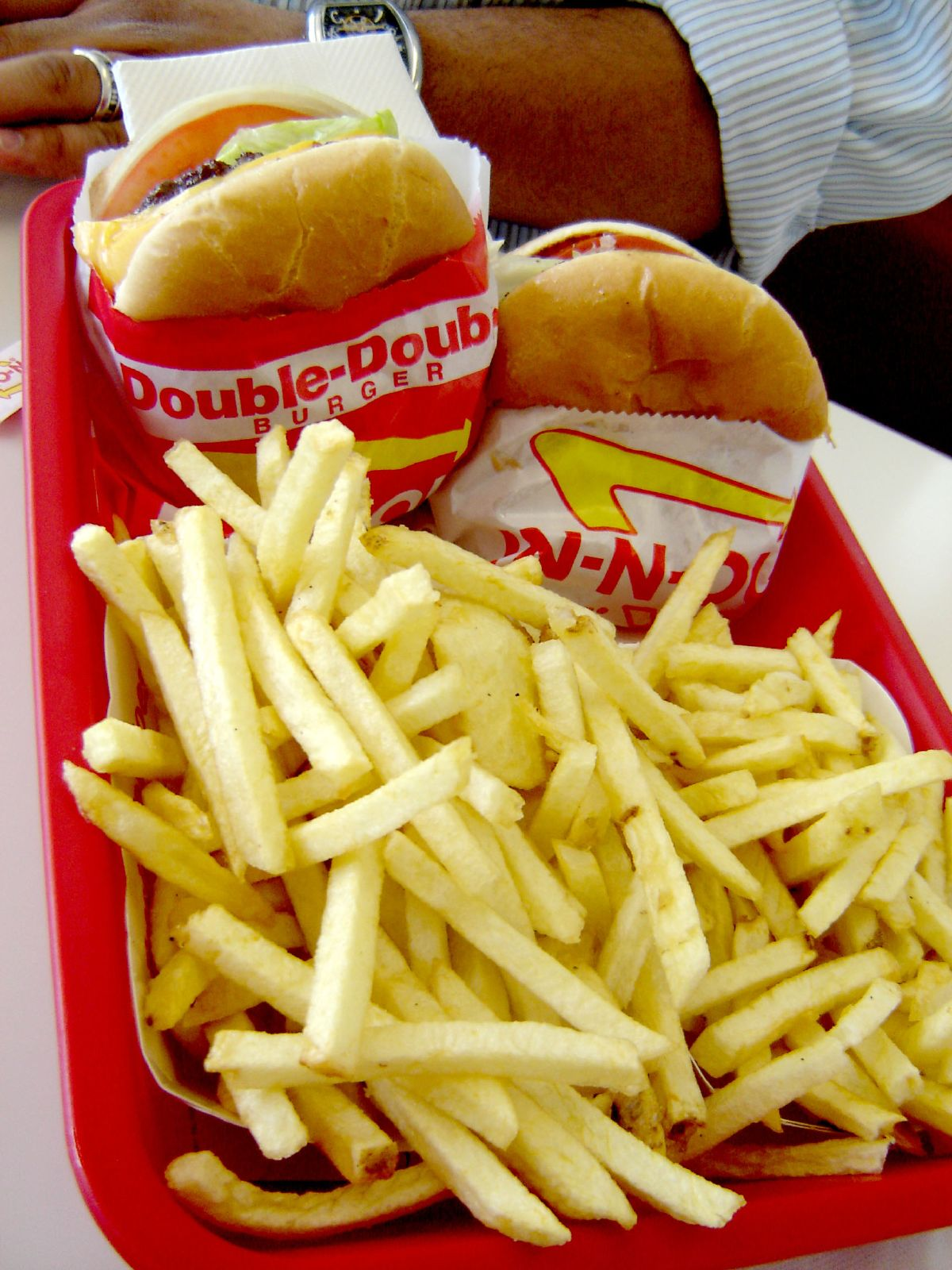
In-N-Out burgers

California is also an important producer of tomatoes. California tomatoes have become a staple ingredient in ketchup, though ketchup was originally made with everything from plums to mushrooms.

With Napa Valley in the north, Santa Barbara, and the Temecula Valley in the southern part of the state, California is the world's fourth largest producer of wines, and accounts for 90 percent of the wine production in the United States. Originally started by Spanish settlers to create wine for Mass in the 18th century, the wine industry in California rivals other wine-producing countries of the world, such as France, Australia and Chile, even winning the Judgment of Paris wine competition.

Santa Maria, California is home to a unique type of barbecue, which normally encompasses beef, in particular tri tip, smoked over oak wood served with beans and salsa.

Veganism is popular in California.

McDonald's, In-N-Out Burger, Jack in the Box, Original Tommy's, Rubio's, Round Table Pizza, Taco Bell, Del Taco, Jamba Juice, Carl's Jr., California Pizza Kitchen, Wienerschnitzel and The Cheesecake Factory, have origins in California.

== Sports ==
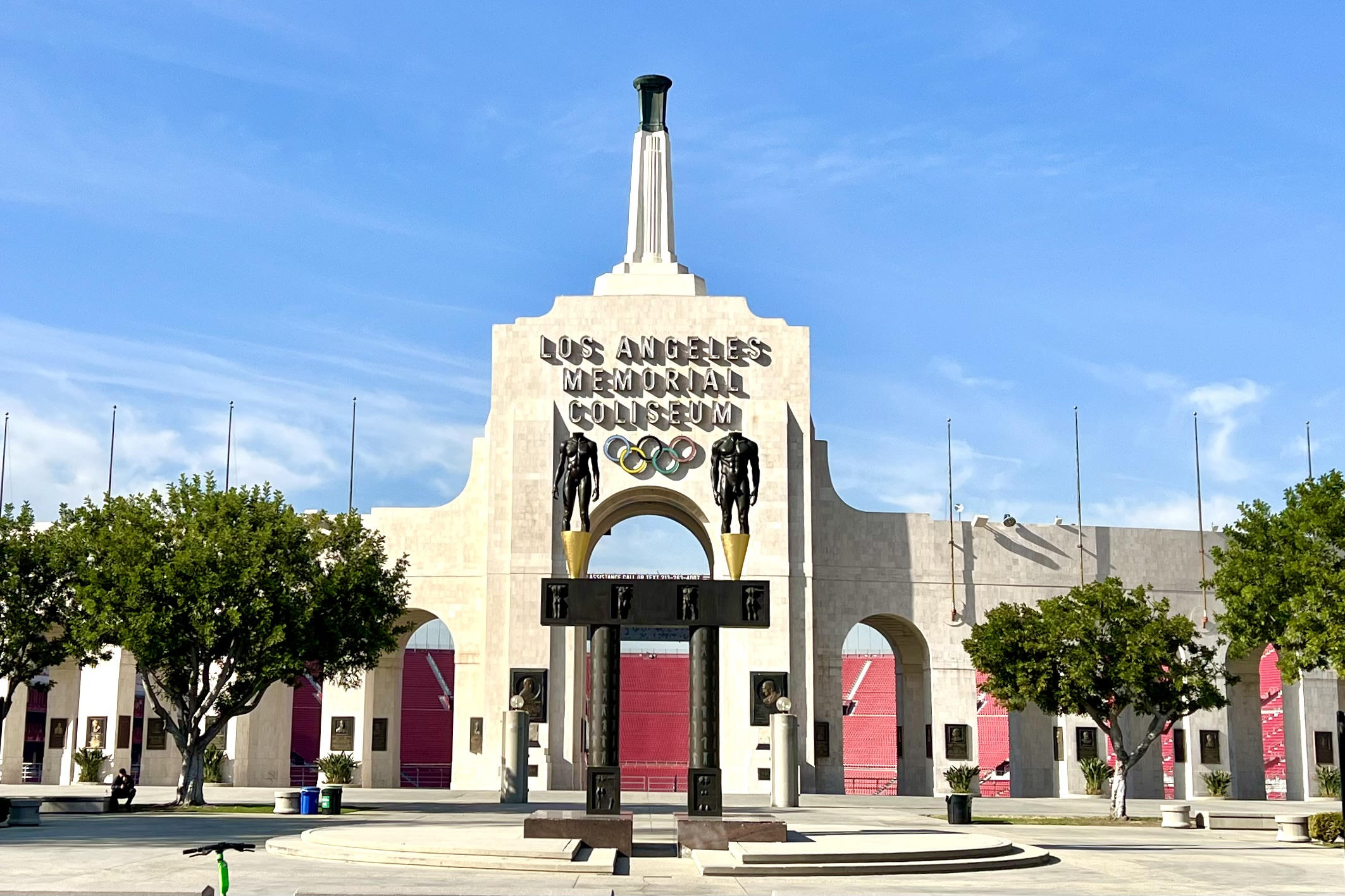
Los Angeles Memorial Coliseum, host of the 1932 Summer Olympics and 1984 Summer Olympics, and future host of the 2028 Summer Olympics.

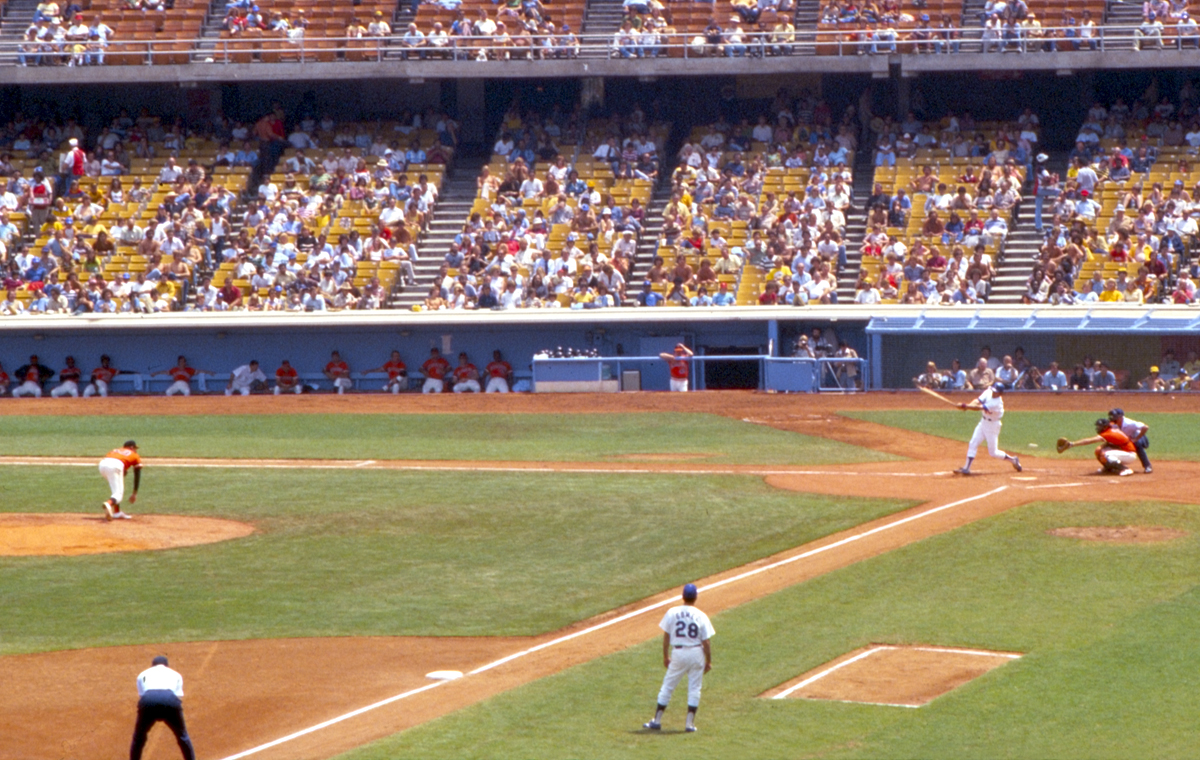
The San Francisco Giants playing the Los Angeles Dodgers at Dodger Stadium in August 1977

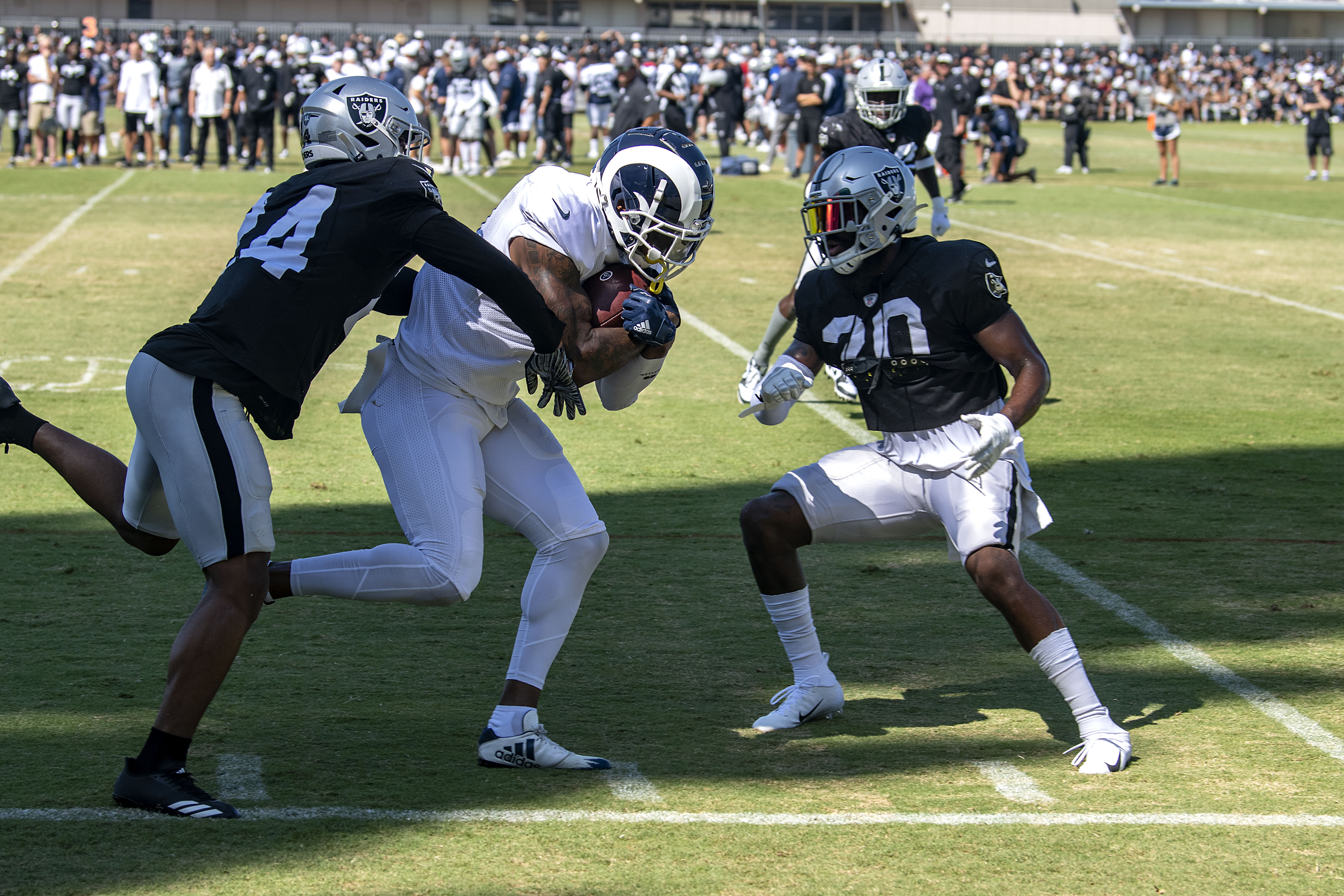
Oakland Raiders defensive backs pursuing a Los Angeles Rams receiver in a joint practice during the 2019 NFL training camp.

California has 19 major professional sports franchises, far more than any other US state. The Greater Los Angeles Area has ten major league teams. The San Francisco Bay Area has five major league teams spread amongst three cities: San Francisco, San Jose and Santa Clara. As of 2025, San Diego and Sacramento each host two major league teams.

== Environmentalism ==
California has a reputation for environmentalism. Californians, especially those living on the coasts, are viewed as being advocates of environmental issues. The environmental culture of California can be partly attributed to public outrage at the major oil spill in the Santa Barbara Channel in 1969. The influential social conditions resulting from this oil spill are explained in detail by environmental sociologist Harvey Molotch.

In 1965, California became the first state to regulate vehicle exhaust by setting limits on hydrocarbons and carbon monoxide emissions. In 1967, the California EPA set the nation's first air quality standards for total suspended particulates, photochemical oxidants, sulfur dioxide, nitrogen dioxide, and other pollutants. The United States Congress has allowed California to set its own pollution standards, and the state's legislators have responded with some of the strongest environmental laws ever passed.

Some Californians are concerned about the rising water levels that will be caused by global warming which will threaten areas along the coast. Additionally, with warming trends at their present rates, experts generally agree that the Sierra Nevada snowpack, which is crucial to the state's drinking water, could decline by approximately 50 percent.

California's Water Board's regulation of PFOA and PFASs have the strictest notification level requirements in the Nation.

== Education ==
=== Public universities and colleges ===
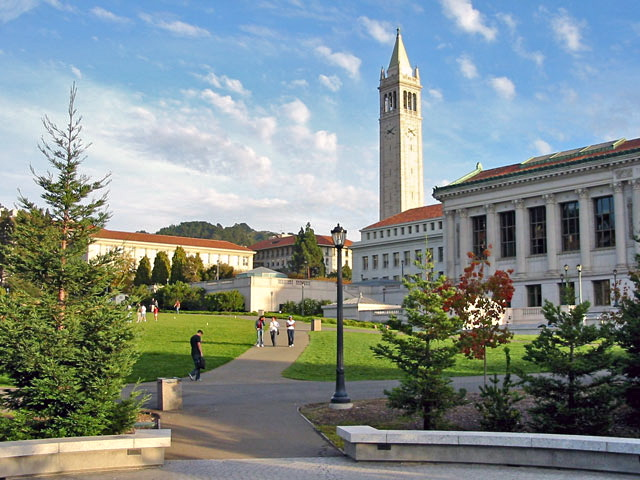
The University of California, Berkeley is the flagship school of the University of California system.

California offers a three-tier system of public postsecondary education.

The preeminent research university system in the state is the University of California (UC), which employs more Nobel Prize laureates than any other institution in the world, and is considered one of the world's finest public university systems. There are nine general UC campuses (most notably at Berkeley and Los Angeles), and a number of specialized campuses in the UC system.

The California State University (CSU) system has over 400,000 students, making it the largest university system in the United States. It is the oldest public institution of higher learning in the State of California, and is intended to accept the top one-third of high school students. The CSU campuses were originally separately-established normal schools, but are now organized in a comprehensive university system, awarding machelor's, master's, and doctoral degrees.

The California Community Colleges system provides lower division courses. It is composed of 115 colleges, serving a student population of over 2.9 million.

=== Private universities and colleges ===
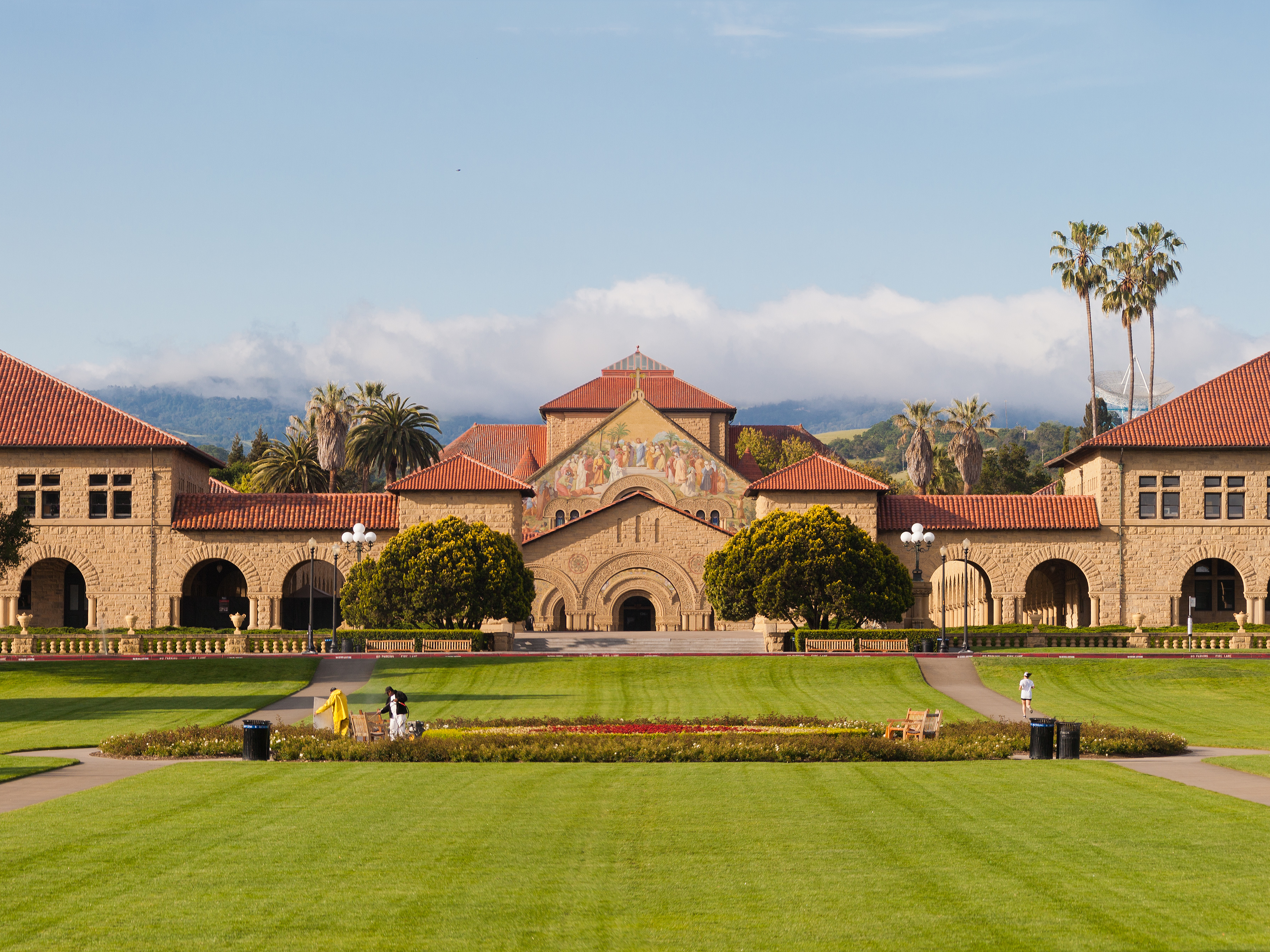
Stanford University oval

California is also home to such notable private universities as Stanford University, the Claremont Colleges, the California Institute of Technology (Caltech), and the University of Southern California (USC). California has hundreds of other private colleges and universities, including many religious and special-purpose institutions.

Public secondary education consists of high schools that teach elective courses in trades, languages, and liberal arts with tracks for gifted, college-bound and industrial arts students. California's public educational system is supported by a unique constitutional amendment that requires 40% of state revenues to be spent on education.

== Beach culture ==
In the 1960s, surfing became immensely popular due to surf rock bands like the Beach Boys, surf films like Bruce Brown's The Endless Summer, and Hollywood blockbusters like Gidget. Due to this mainstream surf culture explosion, surfing soon embodied the ideal Californian lifestyle and became a teen sensation as well as a sport. Malibu, California was at the heart of surf culture not only because it is a world-class surf spot, but also due to its youthful "beach" atmosphere and warm weather. Young men began strutting around the beach in boardshorts and women wore more revealing bikini swim suits, which, along with the surfboard, became symbols of beach culture. The surf culture boom of the 1960s soon led to an enormous increase of surfers at beaches around the country and helped surfing develop into the sport it is today.

== Northern–Southern California rivalry ==
Although unified as a single state, northern California and southern California share a rivalry. "NorCal" or "SoCal" pride is a part of many residents' culture.

The rivalry also manifests itself in professional sports, such as rivalries between the following teams:

- San Francisco Giants and the Los Angeles Dodgers in baseball
- Oakland Athletics and the Los Angeles Angels, also in baseball
- San Jose Sharks and both the Anaheim Ducks and Los Angeles Kings in hockey
- San Jose Earthquakes and the Los Angeles Galaxy in soccer
- Both the Golden State Warriors and Sacramento Kings and the Los Angeles Lakers and Los Angeles Clippers in basketball
- San Francisco 49ers and Los Angeles Rams in football

Sureños and Norteños are rival groups of gangs that, except in rare exceptions, strongly follow a northern-southern divide in territory.

== See also ==
- California Myth
- Cuisine of California
- Music of California
- California Mille
- Cannabis in California
- List of California state symbols
- Demographics of California
- California pottery
- California wine

== Bibliography ==
- "California culture: From Gold Rush to Pure Golden State". Universal World Reference Encyclopedia. Vol. 13, book 1. V.S. Thatcher. 1964. pp. 231–233. 64-12955.
