= Skyspace Lech =

Art installation by James Turrell in Lech, Austria

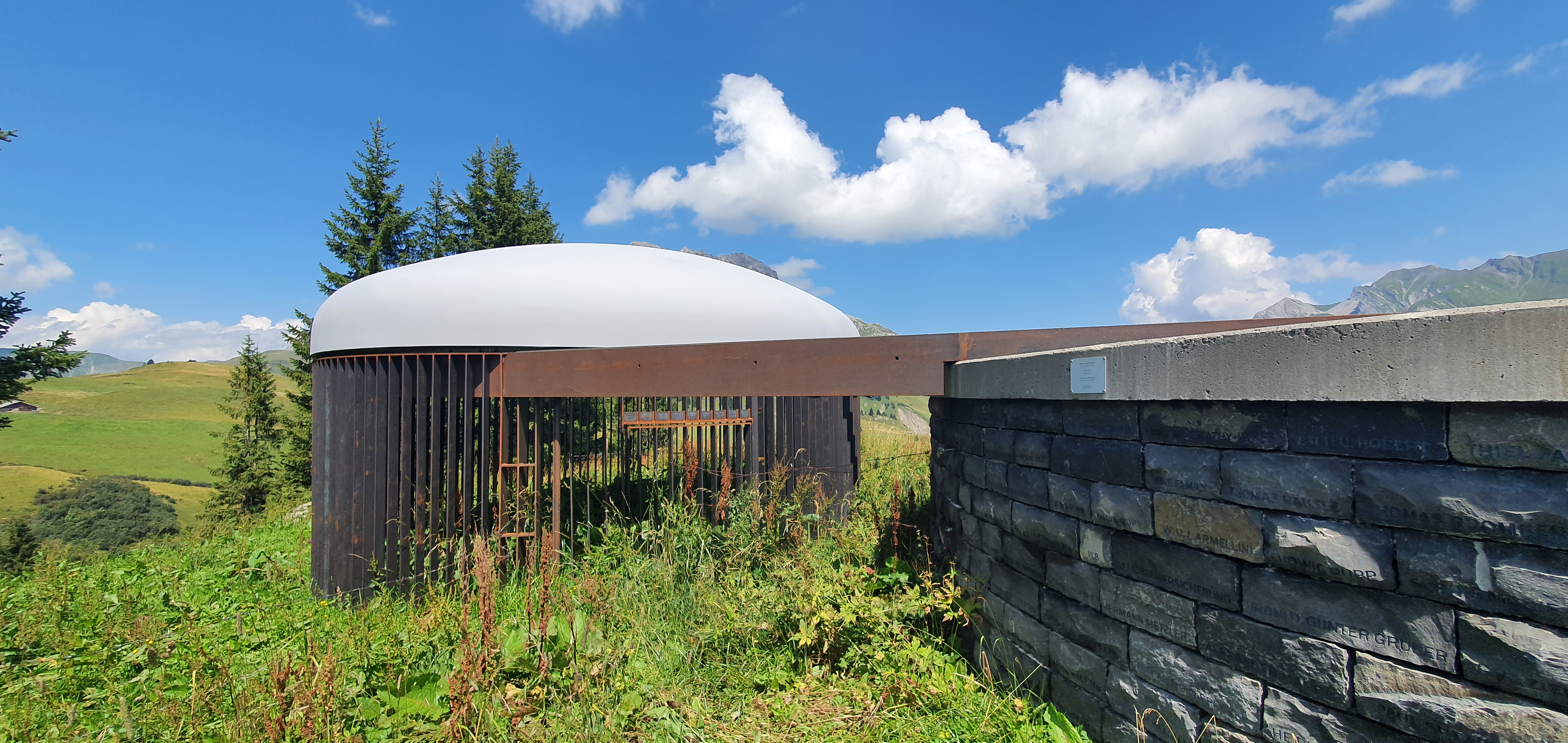
Skyspace Lech

The Skyspace Lech is a walk-in art installation by James Turrell in Tannegg/Oberlech in Vorarlberg (Austria).

In 2014, James Turrell conceptualised the Skyspace Lech design specifically for this location to make the skyspace integrate itself in the landscape seamlessly. It opened to public in September 2018.

== Location ==
The Skyspace Lech is located in Tannegg in Vorarlberg, the westernmost federal state of Austria, at an altitude of 1.780 m. It is in walking distance from Oberlech at the "Alpe Tannegg", above the mountain station of the gondola Schloßkopfbahn.

== The skyspace ==
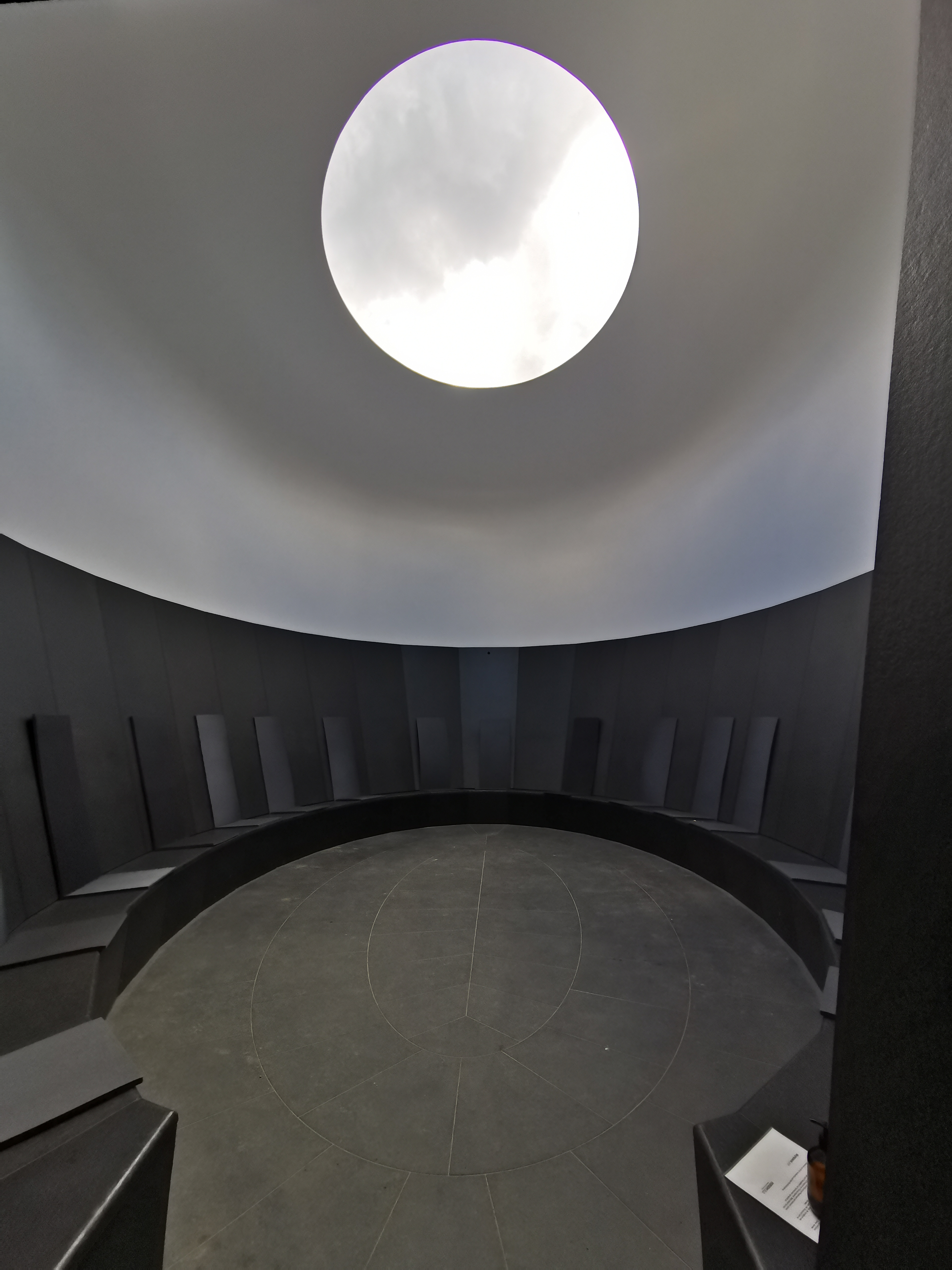
The Sensing Room

The American light artist James Turrell is the original designer of the so-called "skyspace". A skyspace is an enclosed space which is open to the sky through a large hole in the ceiling or dome. It usually is large enough for about 15 people.

The Skyspace Lech is largely underground. A 15 m long tunnel gives access to the oval main room "Sensing Room", which measures 6 m by 9 m. It is 5.20 m high and equipped with a bench and offers space for around 30 visitors. The oval opening in the ceiling has a dynamic dome that can be moved and provides different perceptual effects depending on the weather and the incidence of light (e.g., colour-changing light at the walls). Three light installations also create variable color moods.

The bookable program starts 50 minutes before sunrise or at sunset. The light performances last for about 45 minutes during which visitors are able to spot the Biberkopf summit and the village Bürstegg on one side and on the other the Omeshorn.

The project was designed and built in cooperation with Vorarlberg companies (lighting technology: Zumtobel, architecture: Baumschlager Eberle). The Skyspace Lech cost around 1.5 million euros.

== See also ==
- List of museums in Vorarlberg

== Photo gallery ==
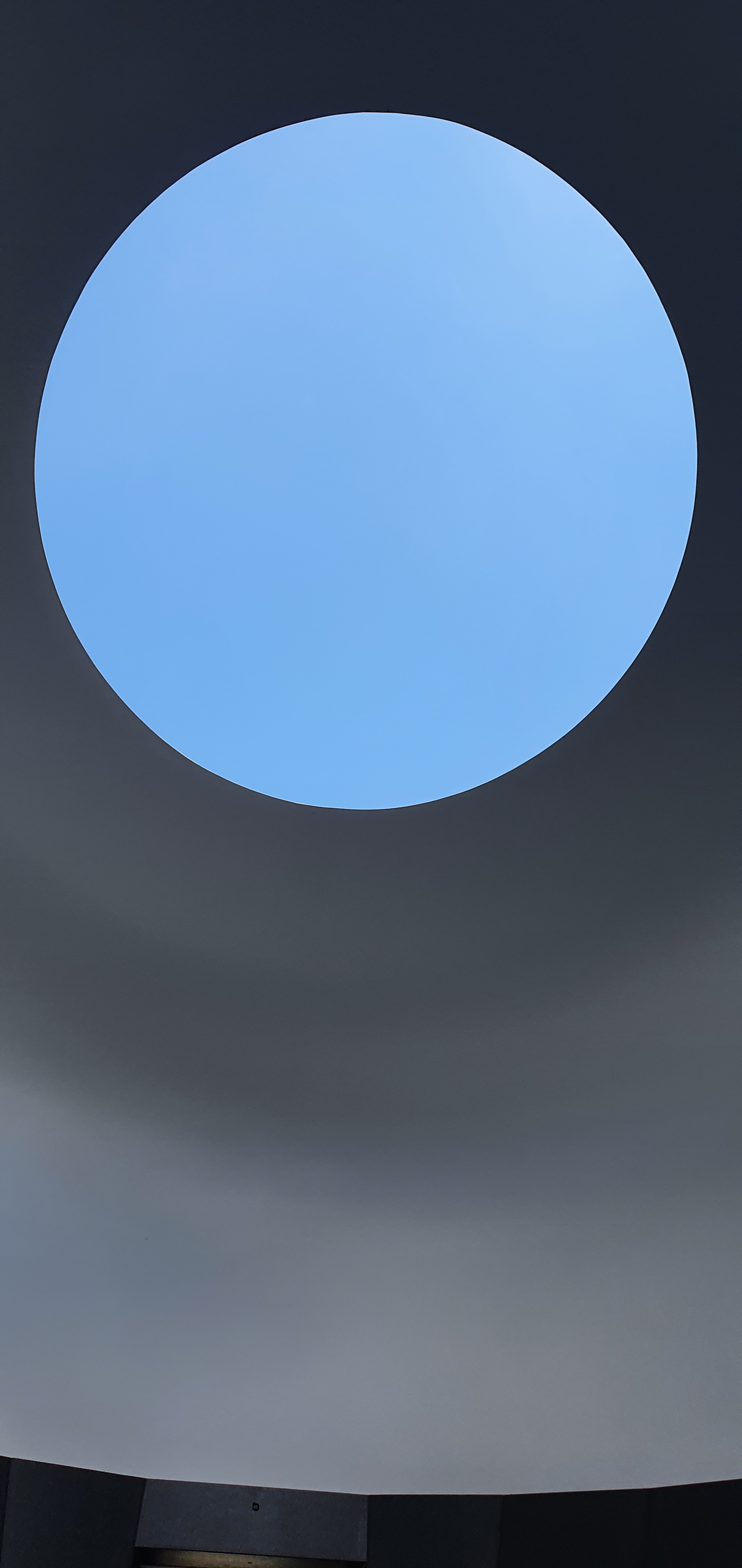
View upon the sky through the hole

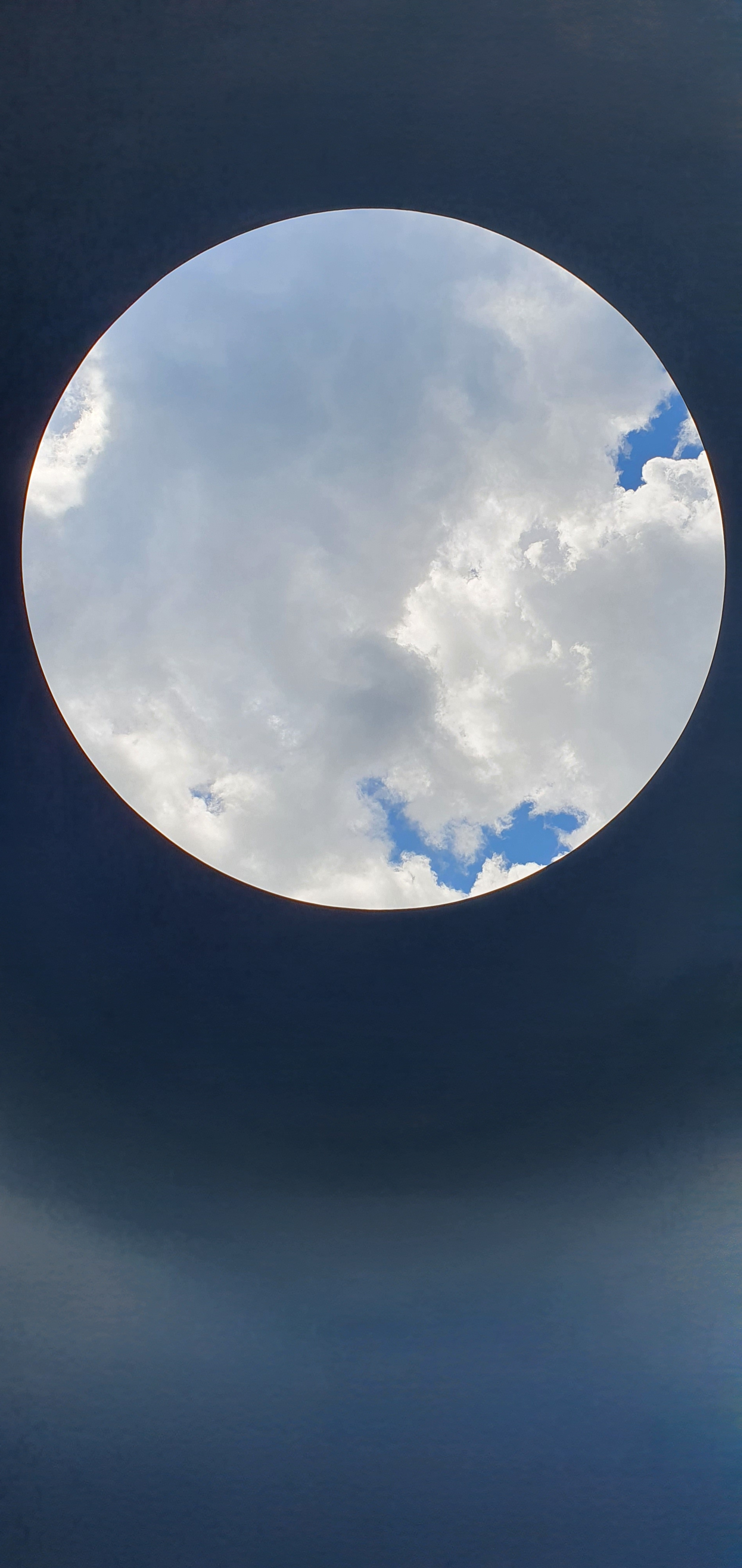
View upon the sky through the hole

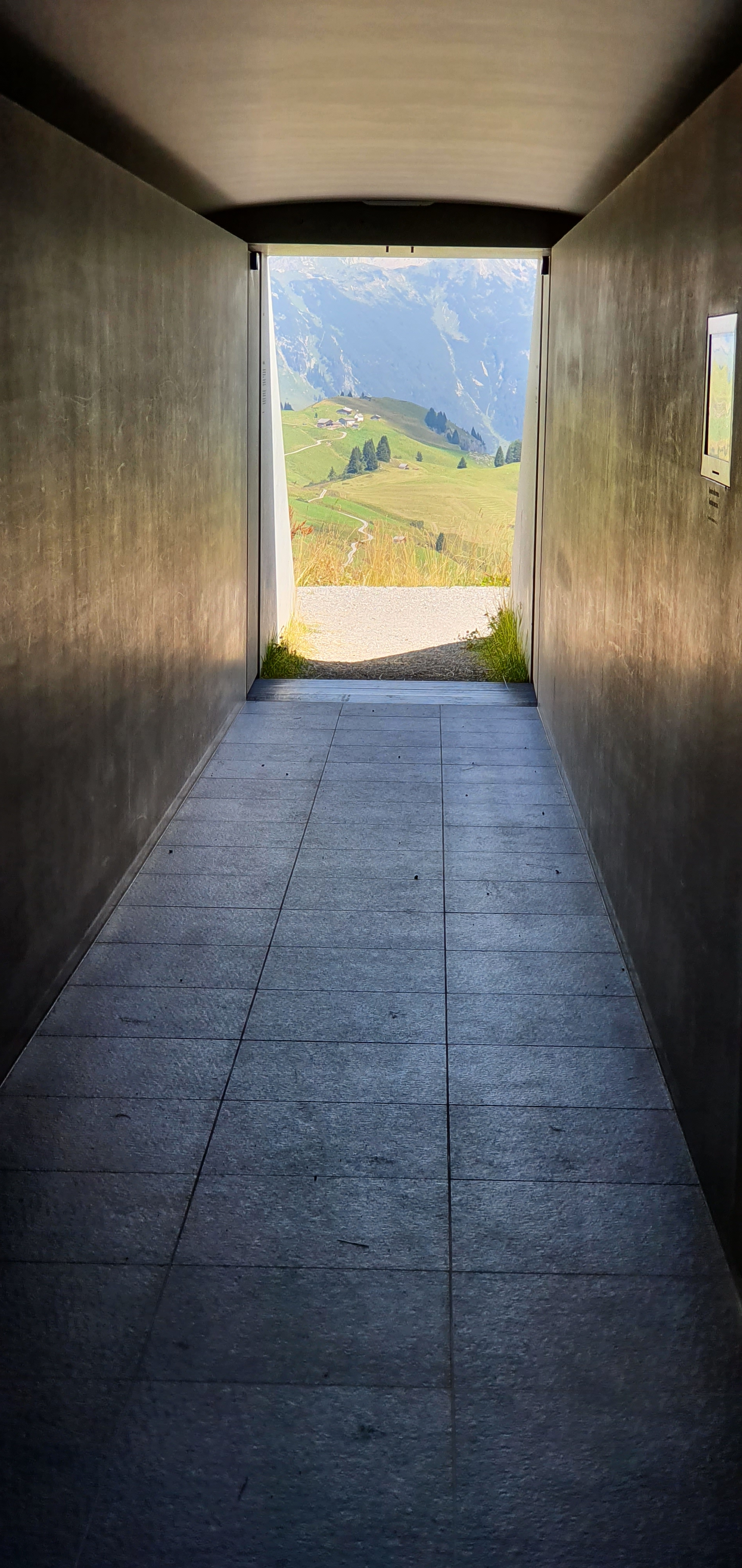
Tunnel from the outside to the Sensing Room
