= Dividing the Light =

Art installation by James Turrell

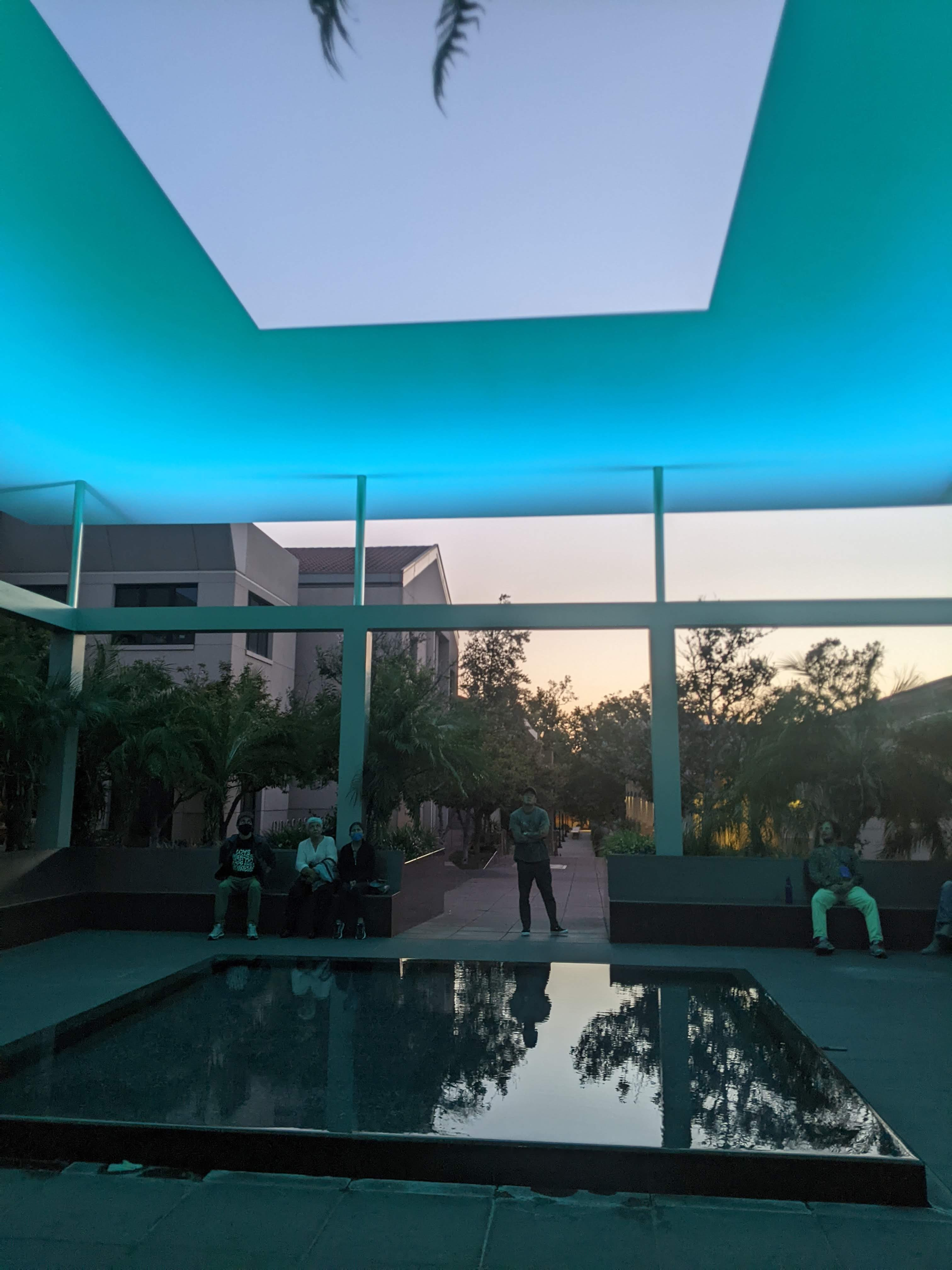
- Artist: James Turrell
- Year: 2007
- Medium: Granite, steel
- Movement: Light and Space
- Location: Pomona College, Claremont, California, United States; 34°06′01″N 117°42′47″W

Dividing the Light, colloquially the Pomona College skyspace, is a 2007 skyspace art installation by James Turrell at Pomona College, his alma mater. It consists of a courtyard with a fountain nestled between two academic buildings with an illuminated canopy framing the sky above.

== Background ==
James Turrell graduated from Pomona College in 1965. Starting in the 1970s, he created a series of skyspaces that framed the sky. He was approached by the college when it was designing the Lincoln Hall and Edmunds Hall academic buildings and asked to create an installation for the Draper Courtyard located between them.

== Description ==
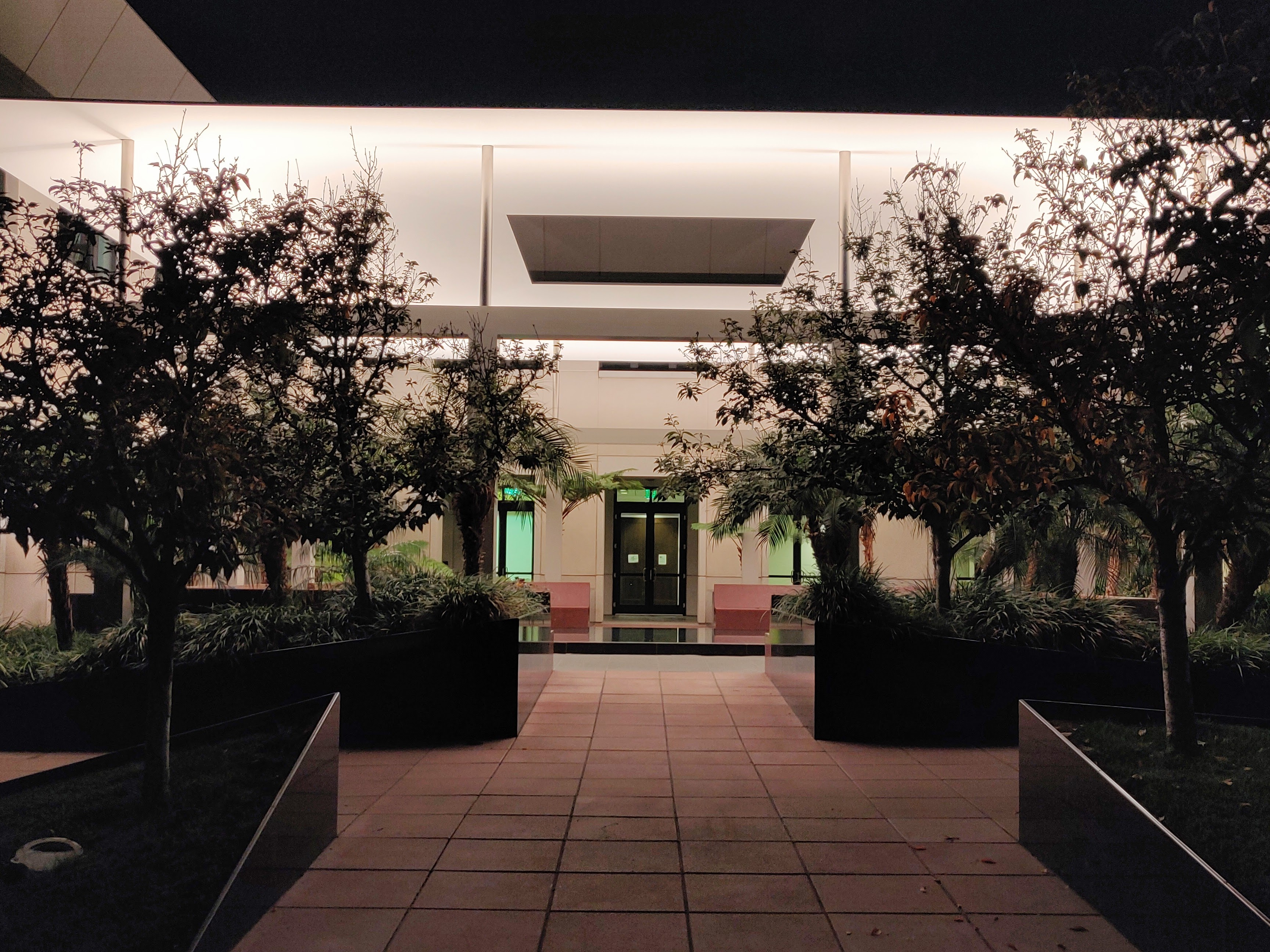
Exterior view at night

Red granite benches line a partially-enclosed courtyard with a shallow black granite infinity pool. A thin brightly-colored steel canopy covers the installation, with a nearly 16-square-foot (1.5 m^{2}) cutout or aperture, that contains an LED lighting array. At night, the hidden LED lights illuminate the canopy. Every hour between sunset and sunrise, they "chime", rotating through a series of colors over three minutes, and longer light shows take place daily at sunrise and sunset. The shows slightly vary with each day to match changing conditions over the course of a year. Short trees and other landscaping surround the exterior.

== Construction ==
The work is Turrell's first public installation in Southern California. It cost US$2.26 million to complete. It was constructed in consultation with Marmol Radziner, AIA, and Amazing Steel. It underwent maintenance work in 2018.

== Reception ==
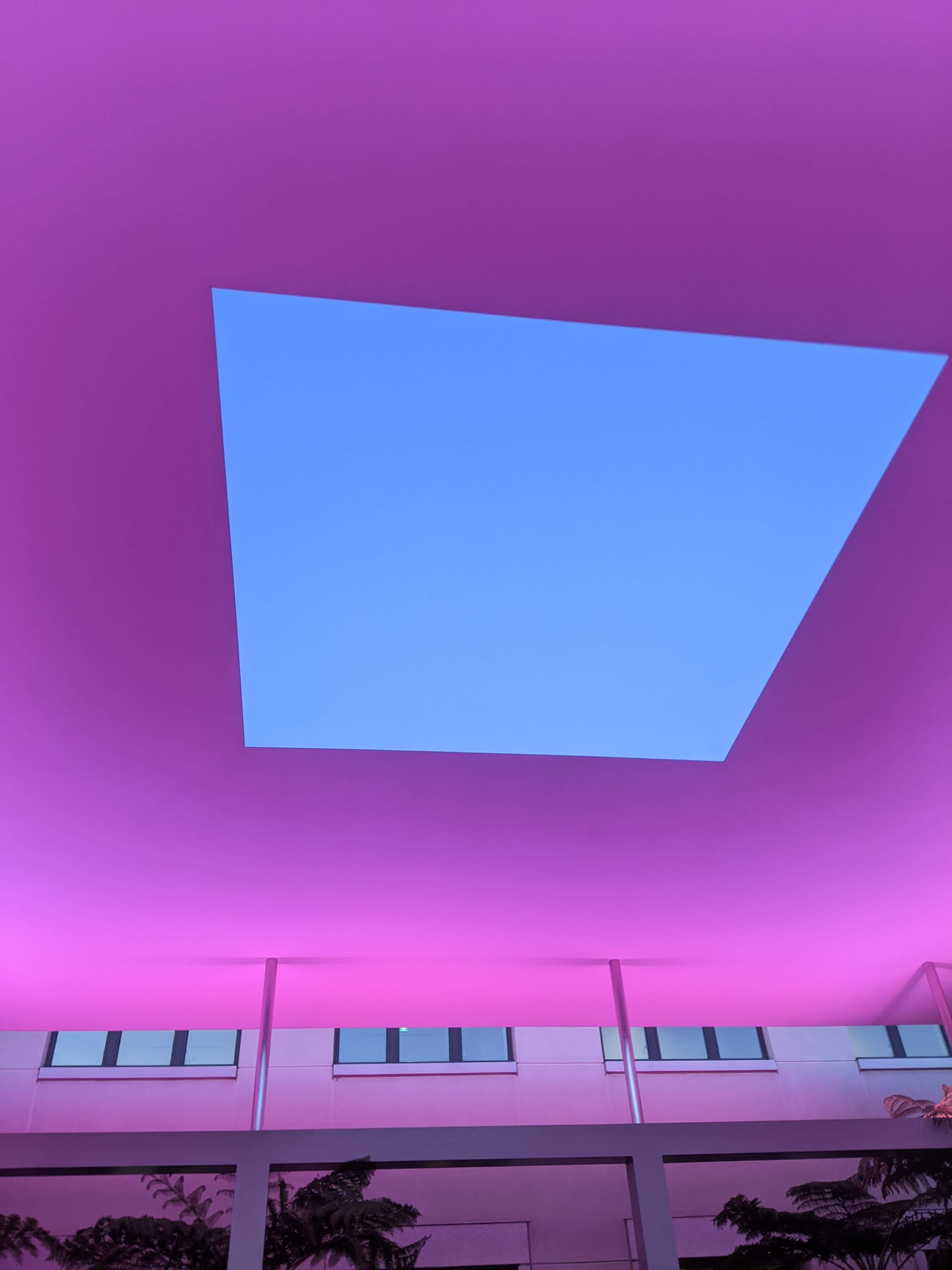
Illuminated pink at dusk

The installation received critical praise. A Los Angeles Times review called it "one of the best works of public art in recent memory", lauding "Turrell's capacity to pull experiences of sensual refinement out of the heavens". Other critics noted its easy accessibility. It is associated with the Light and Space movement that originated in Southern California in the 1960s, and of which Turrell is a prominent member.

The college uses the skyspace courtyard as an event venue. Wading in the pool has been prohibited since c. 2009.

== See also ==
- Prometheus
- Genesis
- The Spirit of Spanish Music
