= White Americans in California =

41.2% of California's population

White Californians
- Map of California Counties by race, areas in blue are greater than 50% white non-Hispanic.

Total population
- 22.05 million (41.2%) white alone (2020 census)

Regions with significant populations
- Los Angeles County: 5,010,533
- San Diego County: 2,298,056
- Orange County, California: 1,911,509
- Riverside County: 1,457,907

Religion
- Christianity, Judaism, Irreligion, Islam

White Californians are White Americans living in California who currently comprise 41.2% of the state's population according to the official 2020 census.

As of 2015, California has the third-largest minority population in the United States. Non-Hispanic whites decreased from about 76.3–78% of the state's population in 1970 to 36.5% in 2019. It was estimated in 2015 that Hispanic and Latino Americans became more numerous than non-Hispanic White Americans for the first time. The 2000 U.S. census indicated that California became the second state in U.S. history (after Hawaii since its statehood in 1959) whose population is composed of less than 50% non-Hispanic whites. California is one of nine states where non-Hispanic whites have become a minority. Most people who identify as white in California say their heritage is Mexican, German, Irish, English, Italian, French, Spanish, Scottish, Polish, Salvadoran, Swedish, Portuguese, Dutch, Armenian, or British. There are also sizable Iranian, Bulgarian, Romanian, Greek, Hungarian, Austrian, Danish, Lithuanian, Finnish, Lebanese, Ukrainian, white Australian, Croatian, Serbian, Slovak, and Albanian populations in California. Most European immigrants in California come from Ireland, Germany, and United Kingdom, alongside countries such as France and Italy.

According to the 2010 U.S. Census Bureau, 9.8% of White Californians were Germans, 7.8% Irish, 6.9% British and 4.3% were Italians.

== History ==
The first white people to come to the modern-day State of California were the Spanish people. The area that became California was a part of the Spanish Empire, and after 1821, part of Mexico. While under Spanish and Mexican rule, California's population was a diverse mix of people with White, Mestizo, African and Indigenous ancestry, with Native people being the largest population. By 1846, more white Americans had begun to enter California from other parts of the United States, making up 10% of the non-Native population.

The California gold rush (1848–1855) began on January 24, 1848, when gold was found by James W. Marshall at Sutter's Mill in Coloma, California. In 1848, there were 7,000 persons of Mexican and Spanish descent, 700 Americans, 200 Europeans, and 110,000 Native Americans. The news of gold brought some 300,000 people throughout the Gold Rush to California from the rest of the United States and abroad. Two-thirds of these new arrivals were Americans, mostly from the Atlantic Seaboard. In 1850, a year after California's admission to the United States, the first state census showed California's entire non-Native population at 92,597.

While Northern California became predominantly white by the mid-19th century, Southern California remained mainly Mexican until the first major waves of white immigrants began to arrive in the 1880s after the Southern Pacific railroad reached Los Angeles. Between 1880 and 1920, Southern California’s population grew from 64,000 to 1.3 million, which included an influx of white health-seekers, real estate investors, and Midwestern farmers. As Southern California in the late nineteenth century was promoted as a “semi-tropical” paradise ideal for health and agriculture, these groups of immigrants, many of whom were middle-to-upper-class Americans, moved into the region via the newly built railroads connecting Southern California to the rest of the United States. A 1913 census shows that white Americans composed 95% of California’s population. Other sources note that by 1910, 96% of the population of Los Angeles was white. Although this is probably an overestimation due to flaws in statistical methods, it shows the significant white predominance in California by the early 20th century.

In the 1930s, about 350,000 mostly White migrants, known as Okies, came to California from the rural Great Plains states and the surrounding area. Their descendants may make up as much as one eighth of California's population, particularly in the Central Valley, Inland Empire, rural areas, and some suburbs of Los Angeles and San Diego.

The Native American population of California was largely decimated and exterminated by white settlers. Whites shot and killed more than 16,000 Indigenous Californians during the California genocide.

As a result of new arrivals from the American Midwest and continued immigration to the United States from other countries, California's white population grew, and by 1940, 90% of the state self-identified as white. By 1990, following increased arrivals into the state of people of other races and nationalities, the white non-hispanic population had decreased, with 43% of the state population claiming Asian, African, Latin American or Native American ancestry.

Racial or ethnic group	1850	1860	1870	1880	1890	1900	1910	1920	1930	1940	1950	1960	1970	1980	1990	2000	2010	2020
White	99.0%	85.0%	89.1%	88.7%	91.6%	94.5%	95.0%	95.3%	95.3%	95.5%	93.7%	92.0%	89.0%	76.2%	69.0%	59.5%	57.6%	41.2%
Non-Hispanic White							92.9%	91.6%	88.5%	89.5%	86.5%	82.9%	77.5%	66.7%	57.2%	46.7%	40.1%	34.7%
Total Population	91,635	323,117	499,424	767,181	1,111,833	1,402,727	2,259,672	3,265,798	5,410,420	6,596,763	9,915,173	14,455,230	17,761,032	18,221,358	20,524,327	20,170,059	21,453,934	16,296,122

== By region ==
Blue areas are predominately non-Hispanic white.

=== San Francisco Bay Area ===
In 2000 the racial makeup of the nine-county Bay Area was 3,941,687 (58.1%) white and 3,392,204 (50.0%) non-Hispanic white.

In 2010 the Bay Area was 3,755,823 (52.5%) white, and 3,032,903 (42.4%) non-Hispanic white.

The percentage of non-Hispanic white people in the overall Bay Area is projected to decrease, while the percentage of non-Hispanic white people in the city of San Francisco is projected to increase.

=== Los Angeles metropolitan area ===
54.6% White, 32.2% white alone. Malibu, Hidden Hills, Manhattan Beach, Agua Dulce, Calabasas and Agoura Hills have the highest percentage of whites in Los Angeles County. Whites in the Los Angeles area are also concentrated in Hollywood Hills, Bel Air and North San Gabriel Valley.

=== By county ===
Nevada County has the highest white percentage of any county in California.

== Politics ==
Non-Hispanic whites comprise 60% of registered voters in California.

== Future ==
The non-Hispanic white population as a percentage of the whole is projected to decrease in California.

== Ancestries ==
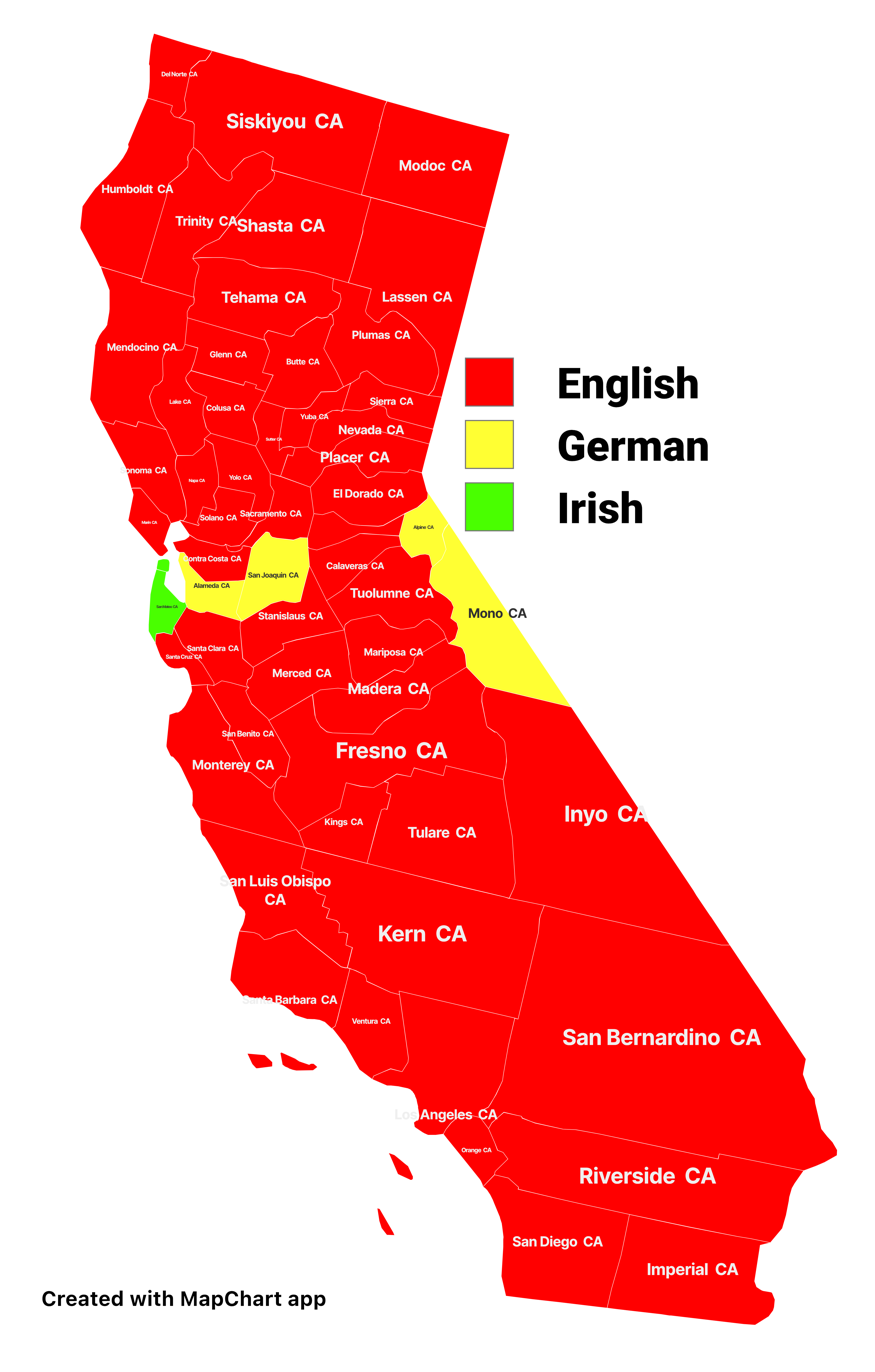
Largest white alone or in any combination ancestry by county in California, per the 2020 census

Ancestry by origin	Number	% (do not add to 100)
(Albania) Albanians	2,204	
(Armenia) Armenians	199,987	5.7%
(Austria) Austrians	10,977	<0.1%
(Basque Country (autonomous community)) Basque	7,996	<0.1%
(Belgium) Belgians	7,452	<0.1%
(United Kingdom) British	123,112	40%
(Bulgaria) Bulgarians	10,158	<0.1%
(Cyprus) Cypriots	193	<0.1%
(Czech Republic) Czechs	17,866	<0.1%
(Denmark) Danes	30,879	0.1%
(Netherlands) Dutch	69,112	0.2%
(England) English	455,396	13%
(Estonia) Estonians	1,421	<0.1%
(France) French	91,701	0.3%
(Finland) Finns	12,888	<0.1%
(Germany) Germans	587,486	16.7%
(Greece) Greeks	50,673	0.1%
(Hungary) Hungarians	30,971	<0.1%
(Iceland) Icelanders	1,959	<0.1%
(Republic of Ireland) Irish	489,015	13.9%
(Italy) Italians	425,772	12.1%
(Latvia) Latvians	3,382	<0.1%
(Lithuania) Lithuanians	12,324	<0.1%
(Luxembourg) Luxembourgers	297	<0.1%
(North Macedonia) Macedonians	1,208	<0.1%
(Malta) Maltese	2,201	<0.1%
(Norway) Norwegians	105,797	3%
(Poland) Polish	472,869	13.5%
(Portugal) Portuguese	118,856	3.4%
(Romania) Romanians	30,685	<0.1%
(Russia) Russians	137,259	3.9%
(Serbia) Serbians	8,993	<0.1%
(Slovakia) Slovaks	7,376	<0.1%
(Slovenia) Slovenes	3,538	<0.1%
(Sweden) Swedish	19,581	<0.1%
(Turkey) Turkish	18,701	<0.1%
(Ukraine) Ukrainians	64,985	0.2%
Total	3,512,158	100%

== See also ==
- Demographics of California

== Bibliography ==
- Maharidge, Dale, The Coming White Minority: California's Eruptions and America's Future, 1996, Times Books, ISBN 9780812922899
- Sherburne Friend Cook, The Conflict Between the California Indian and White Civilization, 1943, University of California Press, ISBN 9780520031425
