= Skyspace =

Architectural design by James Turrell

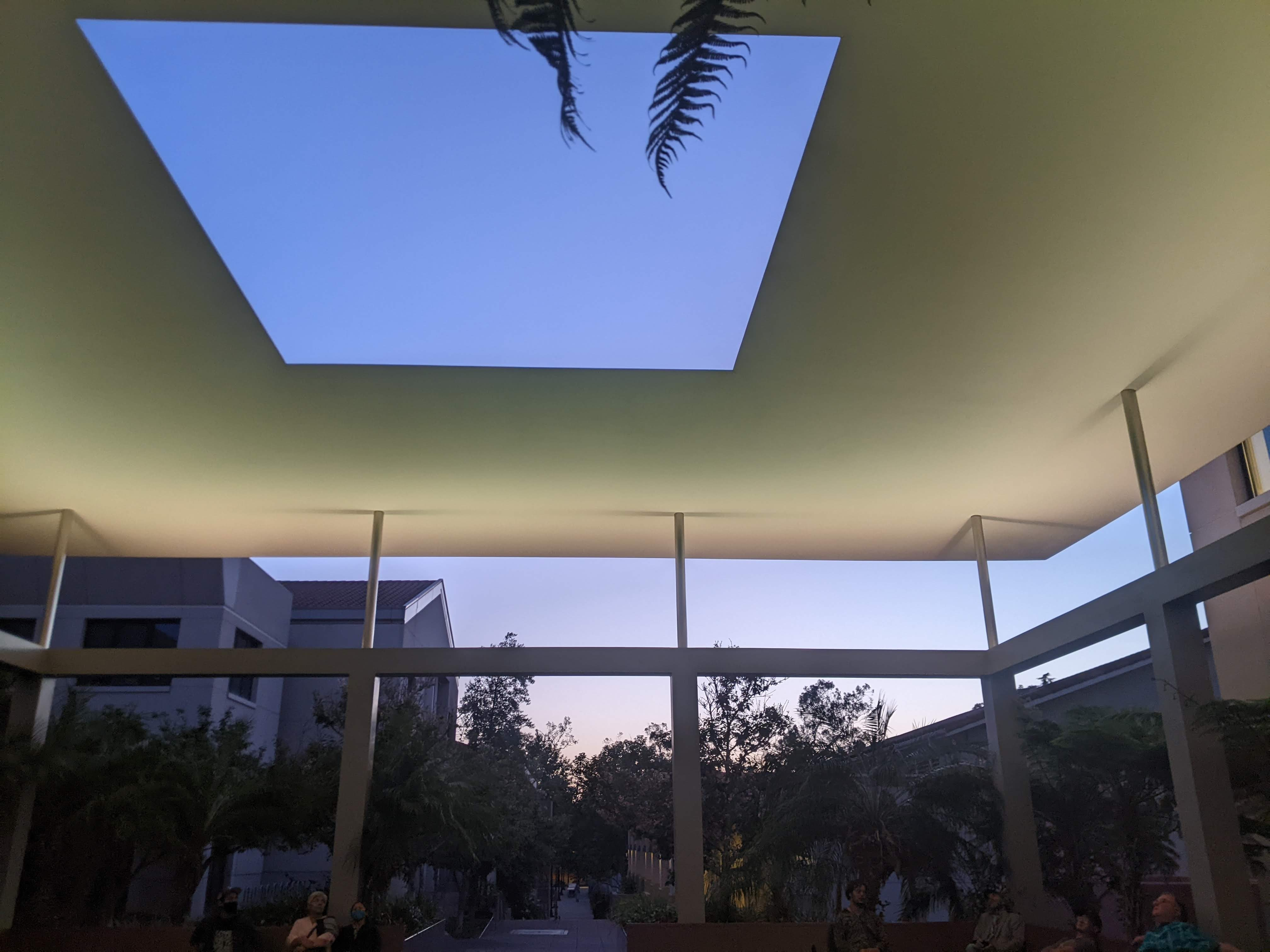
Pomona College Skyspace in California, US

A skyspace is an architectural design in which a room, which is painted in a neutral color, has a large hole in its ceiling that opens directly to the sky. The room, whose perimeter has benches, allows observers to look at the sky in such a way as though it were framed. LED lights which surround the hole can change colors to affect the viewer's perception of the sky.

The design is the work of American artist James Turrell. As of 2013 over 82 skyspaces have been installed worldwide (see list of James Turrell artworks). Examples include Dividing the Light at Pomona College, the Skyspace Lech in Vorarlberg (Austria), the Live Oak Friends Meeting in Houston, Texas and at Rice University, also in Houston.

== Photo gallery ==
Skyspace in Kielder Forest, Northumberland, England

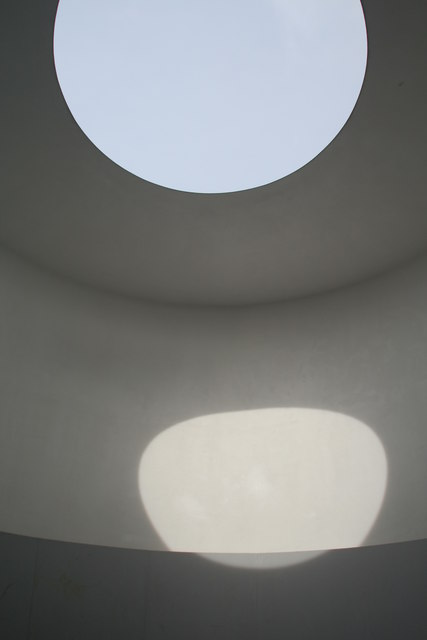
Skyspace in Kielder Forest, Northumberland, England

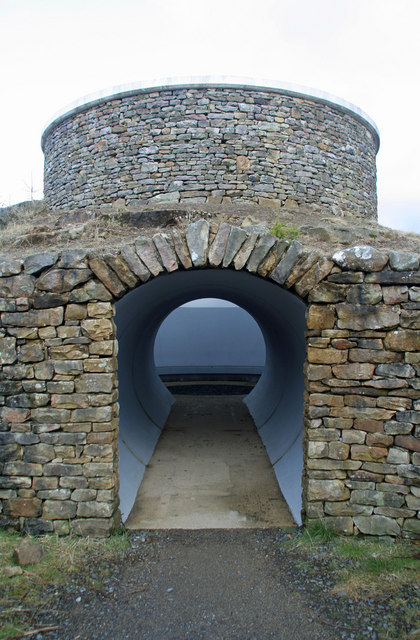
Skyspace in Kielder Forest, Northumberland, England

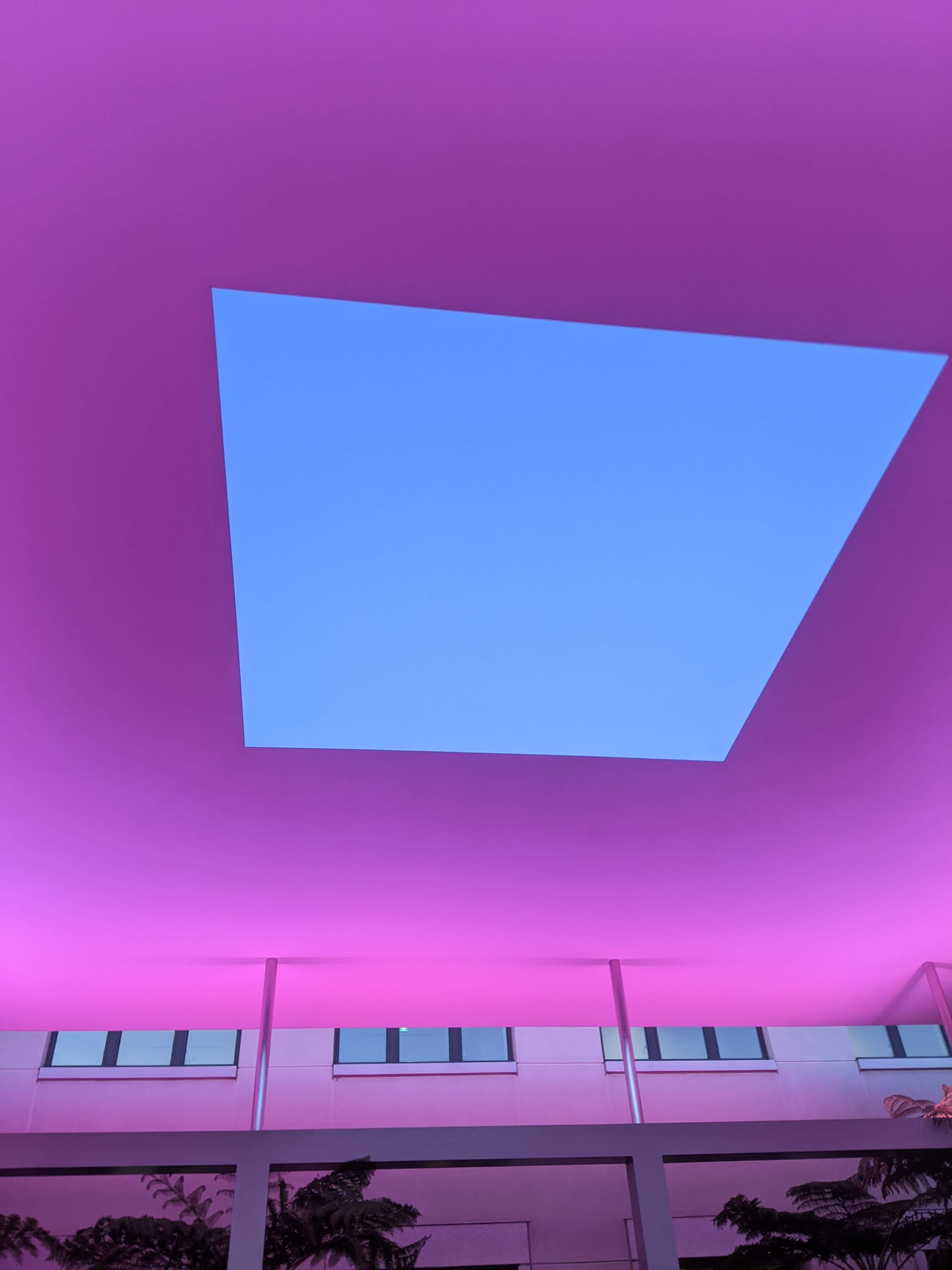
Dividing the Light, Pomona College, California, US

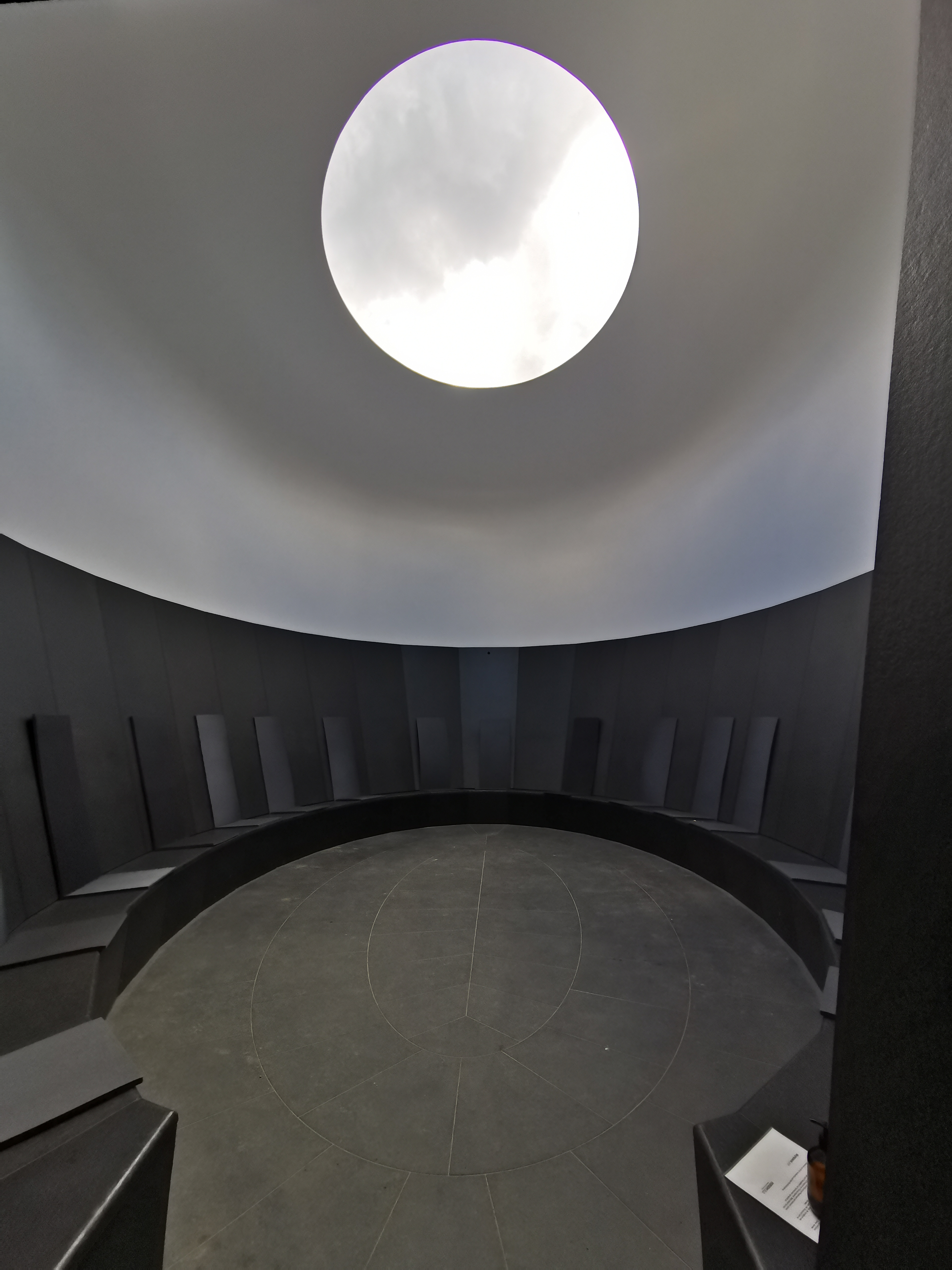
Skyspace Lech in Vorarlberg, Austria

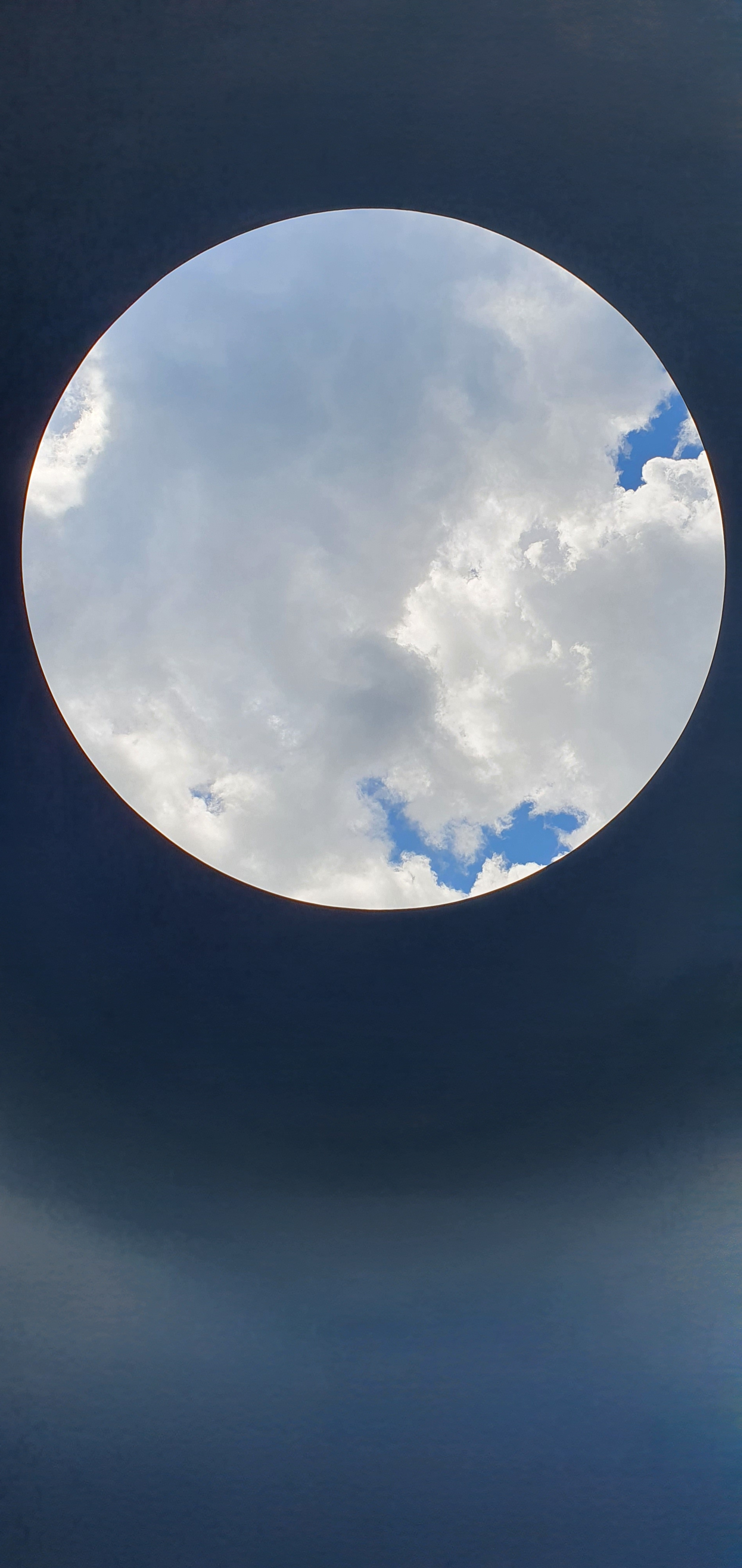
Cloudy sky at the Skyspace Lech, Vorarlberg, Austria

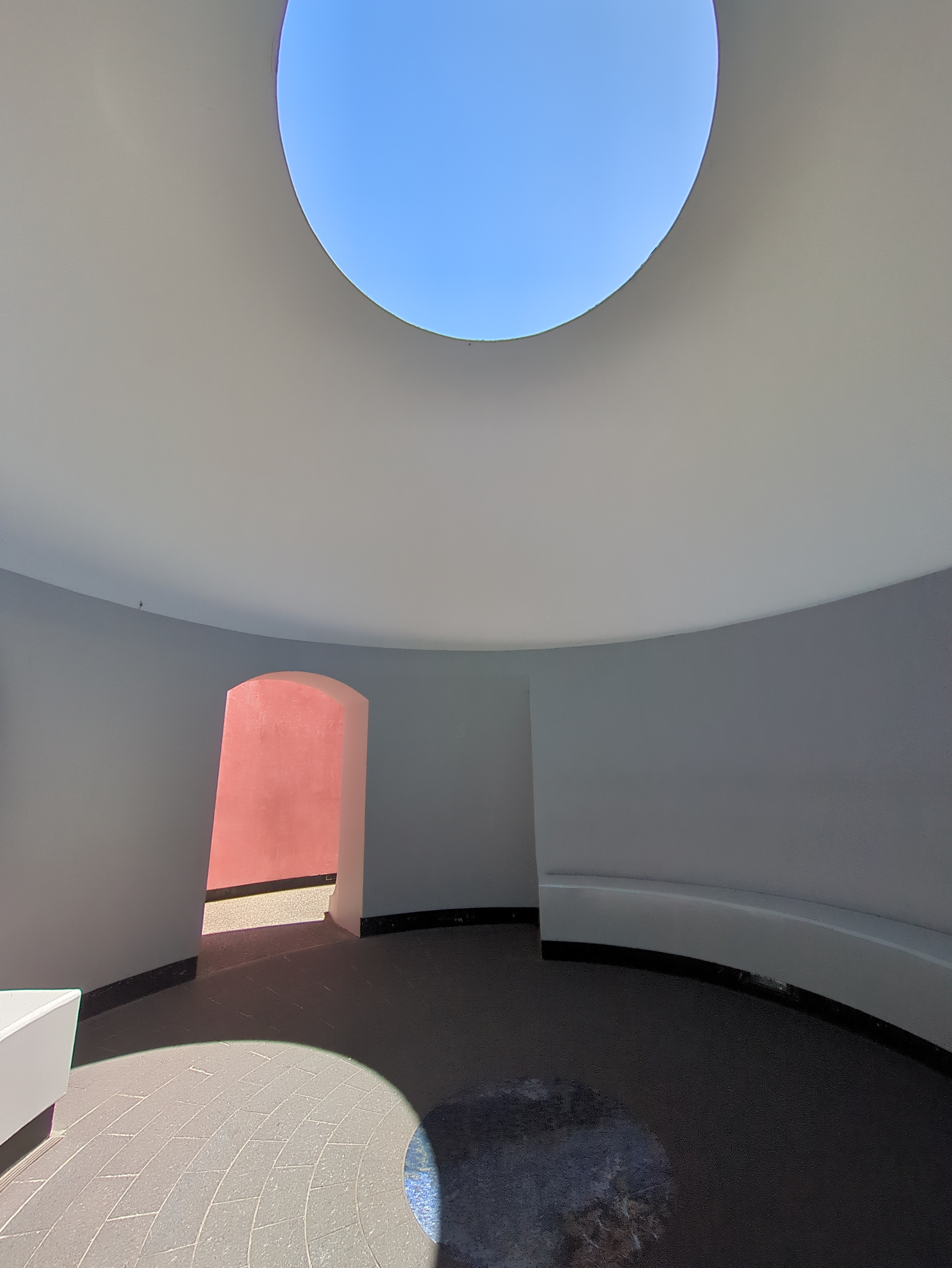
Three Gems Skyspace at the de Young Museum, San Francisco, California, United States
