= Compound Junior =

Sculpture by Beverly Pepper

- Artist: Beverly Pepper
- Year: 1970
- Type: stainless steel
- Dimensions: 210 cm × 350 cm × 390 cm (84 in × 138 in × 152 in)
- Location: Lynden Sculpture Garden; Milwaukee, Wisconsin
- Owner: Bradley Family Foundation

Compound Junior is a public art work by artist Beverly Pepper located at the Lynden Sculpture Garden near Milwaukee, Wisconsin. The stainless steel sculpture is an abstract bent line. The form's ends are pressed to the ground horizontally and its middle is jutting upward vertically; it is installed on the lawn.
