= National Bell Festival =

The National Bell Festival is an annual New Year's Day celebration in the United States. Based in Washington, D.C., the festival coordinates mass bell ringing events to "ring in the New Year" and organizes a festival of free experiences related to bell making, restoration, ringing, and appreciation.

== National annual event ==
The first National Bell Festival was held on New Year's Day 2020, with bell ringing events planned in major cities across the United States. It has since grown to include programming around the world which, during the 2024 festival, reached all seven continents with the addition of a special bell ringing program in Antarctica.

The two-day festival begins on New Year's Eve with the 'Ring around the World' event, starting with bell towers nearest the international date line (typically, New Zealand and Australia). At midnight local time, carillonists perform an arrangement of "Auld Lang Syne." This continues around the world as midnight reaches subsequent time zones. Many performances are recorded and live streamed.

On the following day, New Year's Day, there is a moment for nationwide bell ringing. All are invited to participate by ringing bells at their local churches, community centers, parks, and memorials. In the United States, this occurs annually at 2:00pm Eastern. Carillon performances, change ringing peals, and handbell concerts contribute to the sound.

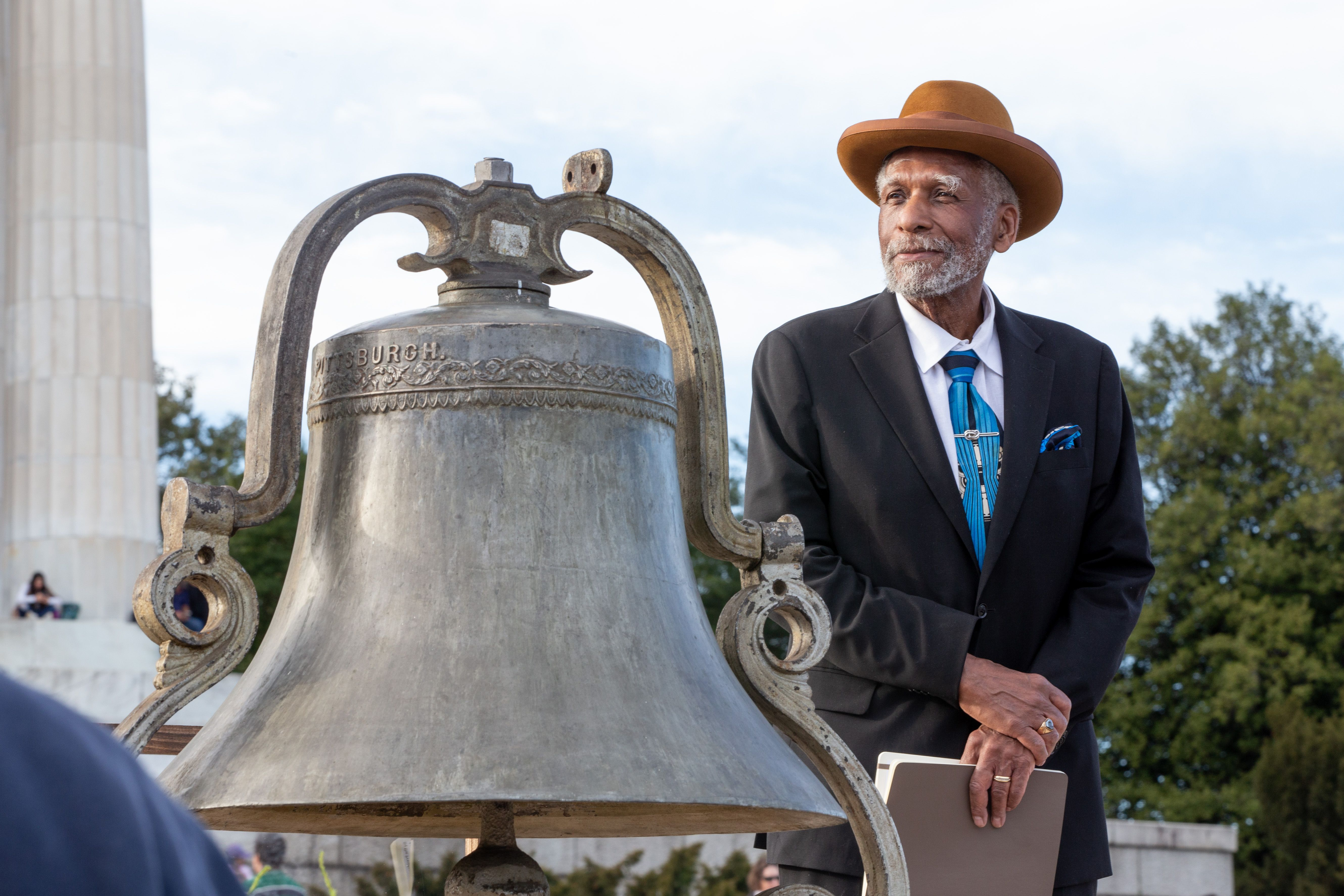
Frederick Douglass IV reads an abridged version of the Emancipation Proclamation next to the 1863 Fulton bell on the steps of the Lincoln Memorial in Washington, D.C., during the National Bell Festival on Jan. 1, 2023.

Other events allow the public unique access to bells and bell towers, often combined with programming commemorating moments of national significance or importance. Recent programming includes:

- Installing a 226-year-old hanshō, a Japanese temple bell, at the U.S. National Arboretum on Jan. 1, 2024.
- Marking 160 years since the 1863 Emancipation Proclamation by tolling a 160-year-old bell on the steps of the Lincoln Memorial on Jan. 1, 2023.
- Commemorating the 200th birthday of Harriet Tubman by ringing a bell 200 times at the Military Women's Memorial at Arlington National Cemetery on Jan. 1, 2022.

== Spotlight nation ==
Each year, the National Bell Festival focuses attention on the bell ringing and bell making heritage of a different nation around the globe by researching, translating, and publishing information on regionally-specific campanological traditions. Past spotlight nations include:

- 2025: Ukraine
- 2024: Japan
- 2023: United Kingdom

The goal of the project is to promote cross-cultural understanding while also demonstrating how bell ringing is a shared human experience across linguistic, regional, and political divides.

== Organization and other activities ==
The National Bell Festival is coordinated by the National Bell Festival, Inc., an all-volunteer 501(c)(3) organization with the stated mission of celebrating and restoring bells in the United States. To advance this mission, the National Bell Festival: invests in the care and restoration of heritage bells and bell towers; commissions the casting of new bells and installations; and researches, records, and reports on campanology.
