= Richard Kayne (investor) =

American private equity investor (born 1945)

Richard Alan Kayne
- Born: 1945 or 1946 (age 80–81)
- Education: Stanford University (BA); UCLA (MBA)
- Occupation: investor
- Known for: co-founder of Kayne Anderson Capital Advisers
- Spouse: Suzanne Kayne
- Children: 3

Richard Alan Kayne (born 1945/1946) is an American billionaire private equity investor and the majority owner of Kayne Anderson Capital Advisers, which he founded in 1984 and has $26 billion in assets under management.

== Biography ==
Kayne was born to a Jewish family, the son of Ida and Jerry Kayne. In 1966, Kayne graduated with a BS in statistics from Stanford University; and in 1968, an MBA from UCLA. After school, he worked as an analyst in New York and then as a principal at Cantor Fitzgerald. In 1984, Kayne co-founded Kayne Anderson Capital Advisers with John E. Anderson.

== Personal life ==
Kayne is a director of the Jewish Community Foundation of Los Angeles and a trustee of the UCLA Foundation. As of August 2017, his net worth is estimated at $1.3 billion. He is married to Suzanne, a Los Angeles County Museum of Art trustee. They live in Santa Monica, and have three daughters: Jenni Kayne Ehrlich (who has her own clothing line with six stores); Maggie Kayne (who founded the Kayne Griffin Corcoran art gallery with Bill Griffin and James Corcoran; and Saree Kayne. Although his wife is not Jewish, they raised their daughters in the Jewish faith.
