= National China Garden =

Coordinates: 38.91387°N 76.95984°W

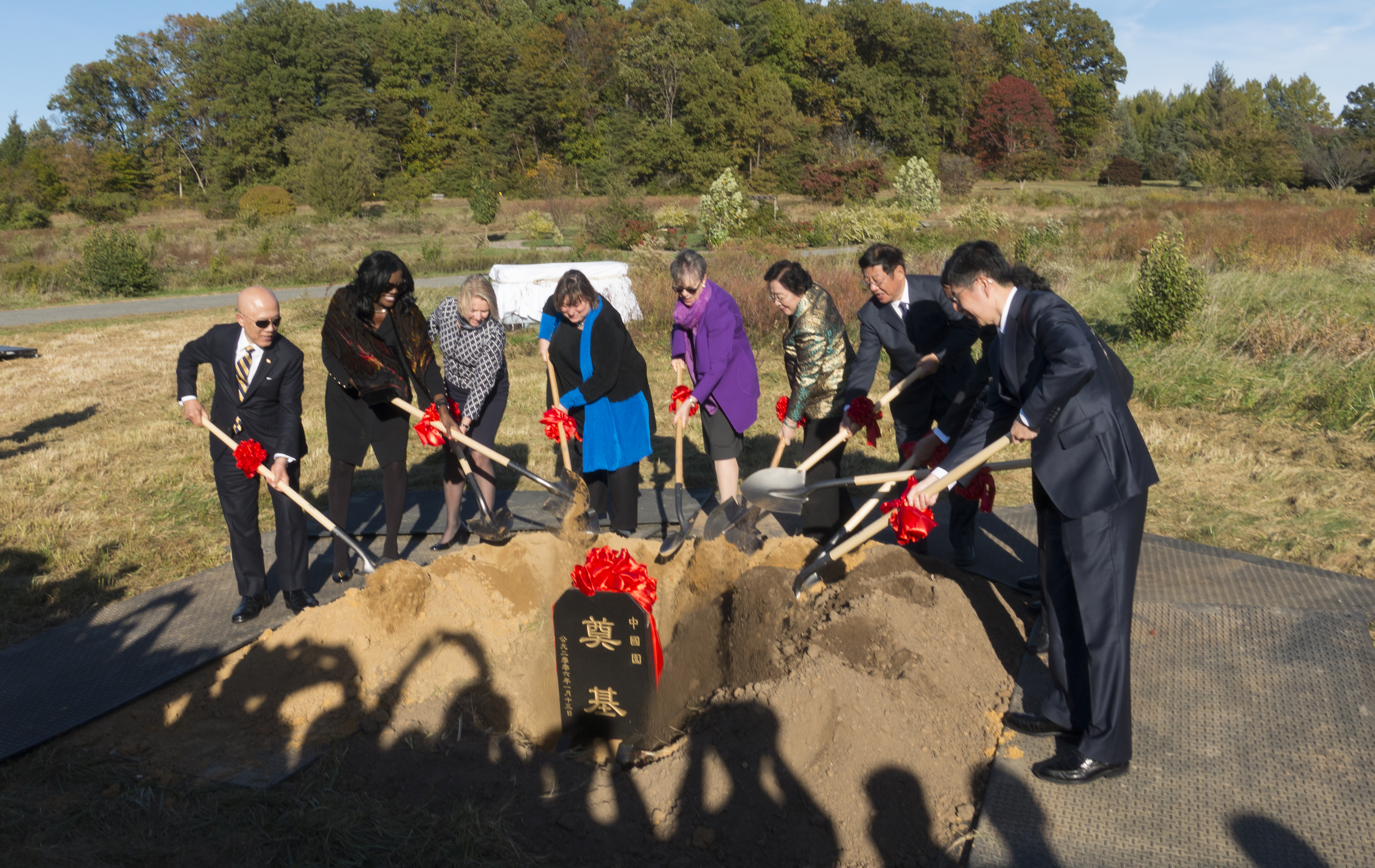
US-China ceremony for the construction of the National China Garden at the U.S. National Arboretum in Washington, DC, September 2016

A National China Garden has been planned for the United States National Arboretum in Washington, D.C. since 2003. In 2018 the proposed construction of the Chinese garden was reported to have been cancelled due to counterintelligence concerns by American intelligence officials.

The garden was intended as a replica of the Ge Garden in Yangzhou. The site for the garden was over 12 acres of the United States National Arboretum in Washington, D.C. The Chinese government planned to fund the entire $100 million cost of the project. Construction was planned for the summer of 2017 and was due to take 30 months. The garden was to have been built by craftspeople from China with landscaping by Rhodeside & Harwell.

A formal agreement for the creation of the garden was signed in 2003 between Joseph Jen, the Under Secretary, Research, Education, and Economics at the US Department of Agriculture and the head of the Chinese Academy of Forestry, Jiang Zehui. It was agreed that the United States government would pay for the infrastructure of the site and the Chinese government for the development of the site. The construction of the garden was approved by the United States Congress in 2008 but federal funding from the American government was seen as unlikely. Funds were then raised by the National China Garden Foundation, a nonprofit organization.

In 2011 the General Secretary of the Chinese Communist Party, Hu Jintao, was presented with a model of the proposed garden by the Vice President of the United States, Joe Biden, and the United States Secretary of State, Hillary Clinton, during his state visit to the United States.

A groundbreaking ceremony was held in 2016 after an agreement on the garden between President Barack Obama and General Secretary Xi Jinping. In 2017 The Washington Post estimated the cost of the materials for the garden as $90 million with work on the site estimated at $30 million. The National China Garden Foundation planned to raise $30 million to fund the operating and upkeep costs of the garden. The Washington Post wrote that the "idea of a gold-plated Chinese garden with all the stylistic bells and whistles seems hard to reconcile with the [United States National Arboretum's] relentless funding issues". The arboretum had a yearly budget of $12 million and had closed for three days a week between 2013 and 2015 in an attempt to save costs.

The garden planned to include a 70 ft high replica of the White Pagoda in Yangzhou. The pagoda was planned to be constructed on one of the highest points in the arboretum. The construction of the pagoda was planned with all materials entering the United States in diplomatic bags which United States Customs Service officials would have been unable to examine. In 2018 the construction of garden was reported by The Wall Street Journal to have been cancelled due to counterintelligence concerns. A representative from the Chinese Embassy in the United States disputed this saying that preparations for construction work were ongoing. In July 2022 CNN reported that "when US counterintelligence officials began digging into the details [of the garden], they found numerous red flags" with officials from the Federal Bureau of Investigation (FBI) believing the elevated site of the proposed pagoda would have been ideal for signals intelligence collection.
