= Bedford Sentinels =

Art installation at Stanford University, United States

- Artist: Beverly Pepper
- Medium: Bronze sculpture
- Location: Stanford, California, United States
- 37.42838°N 122.1656°W

Bedford Sentinels is an art installation consisting of three abstract bronze sculptures by American artist Beverly Pepper, installed at the intersection of Serra and Galvez Streets on the Stanford University campus, in Stanford, California, United States. The sculptures are named after alumni Peter and Kirsten Bedford, who donated the pieces to Stanford.
