= Peter Wegner (American artist) =

American artist

- Born: 1963 (age 62–63); Sioux Falls, South Dakota, US
- Education: Yale
- Known for: Paintings, photographs, collages, prints, artist's books, and large-scale installations

Peter Wegner (born 1963) is an American artist whose works consist of paintings, photographs, collages, prints, artist's books, and large-scale installations. His pieces are included in major public and private collections worldwide.

== Early life and education ==
Wegner was born in Sioux Falls, South Dakota. He earned his BA at Yale University. He works in multiple media, ranging from paintings and photography to large-scale installations and wall works.

== Themes ==
Critics and scholars have identified at least four major themes in Wegner's work.

=== Systems ===
The first theme is the idea of systems and their hidden inadequacies. As architectural scholar Noah Chasin wrote in a 2007 essay,

"Systems often make appearances in Wegner's work to suggest the potential for order, yet the artist continually exposes them as means of introducing disorder… [H]e systematically questions their foundations from within so that the very integrity of each system's signifying capacity is compromised…."

Wagner'ss official bio states that "[h]e often works between conventional categories, creating sculpting, paintings, painterly installations, and architectural photographs." However, Chasin advises viewers to see this aspect of the artist's approach as a constructive rather than a destructive one: “We should not conclude that Wegner’s subversion eliminates meaning but instead that it draws our attention to the way that meaning is created and naturalized.”

=== Color ===
Professor, author, and critic Eve Meltzer noted in a 2002 review that “color may be the… center” of his entire practice. Poet and essayist John Koethe also described Wegner as "obsessed with color." The artist first began deconstructing the subject in the late 1990s with his "Remarks on Color" series, which used commercial paint chip samples as their starting point.

Wagner's color-based "D65" series, begun in 2014, takes its title from "the standard scientific shorthand for the color of daylight", about 6500 kelvins and is "inspired by sunlight in California," according to Wegner. More than a decade earlier, Meltzer linked his use of color with market mechanisms. She wrote of the paint chip works that

"...there is always the problem of capital and its ideological effects. After all the paint chip is an advertising tool—a ploy to make a buck on a dream. Wegner's work makes these systems palpable, not through barefaced institutional critique, but by quietly elbowing some room into their rigid structures or—as he says in his book The Other Today Is the One You Want (2002) by opening up the space between the lines’ and pushing back the horizon.’"

=== Language ===
A third theme identified in Wegner's work is language. Meltzer writes that Wegner's paint chip pieces beg the question: “How can so many shades of red claim the same name when, clearly, language’s system of difference can’t fracture fast enough or splinter small enough to cover the range?”

In a 2007 essay, Henriette Huldisch observed that Wegner “repeatedly invokes language specifically to create associations, to link his works back to the world of ideas and things from which they originated: systems of classification, names of places, and the incidental items of our daily lives (rulers, billboards, contracts, and so on).” Huldisch goes on to describe how “Wegner also work[s] as a bibliophile collagist, appropriating snippets of marketing jargon, then cutting and pasting the functional epithets into semi-accidental verse he terms ‘poetry written by commerce.’"

=== Architecture ===
A fourth theme identified by experts is Wegner's engagement with architecture.

For example, in his photography series "Buildings Made of Sky," Wegner reverses urban streetscapes to reveal how skyscrapers shape the open-air spaces between one another into skyscraper-like forms of their own. Chasin described a 2004 piece from the series in these terms:

“A magical reversal thereby takes place: the physical buildings read visually as a darkened background offset by architectural contours from startling blue-hued visions of skyscrapers carved from atmosphere. Sky becomes building; building, sky—or to invoke K. Michael Hays in a different context, ‘not architecture but evidence that it exists.’”

Wegner has also often pushed the construction of his works in an architectural direction, presenting paintings in the form of leaning columns, complex lattices, and multi-layered scrims. Huldisch noted that “[h]is stacks, grids, and lattice structures reveal both an interest in the forms of Minimalism and a rejection of the stringent doctrine that predicated them." As Wagner states in a 2007 interview,

"I’d like the humor of the work to make itself available to you slowly, so that maybe a couple hours after you’ve been exposed to it, it's still sinking in. You’re not actually laughing until the second or third day, and by that time, you can't quite remember what was funny."

== Key works ==
Wegner's early work focuses on everyday artifacts embedded in popular culture, including typography specimens (the basis for the "American Types" series), commercial paint chips (in the "Remarks on Color" series), and security envelopes (in the "Security" series). When asked in an interview about his interest in such mundane subjects, he answered, "The world is ravishing. Even when you’re focused on nothing, it's almost too much." From roughly the mid-1990s to early 2000s, he gave used these ideas in paintings, works on paper, and artist's books.

In the mid-2000s, Wegner's practice expanded to include large-scale site-specific art installations. The first of these was "COMPLETE & FINAL COLOR THEORY SUPERSEDING ALL PREVIOUS THEORIES & PRE-EMPTING ALL FUTURE THEORIES WITH ADD’L THOUGHTS ON THE POETRY OF COMMERCE, THE CRUELTY OF SYSTEMS & THE BANALITY OF THE GRID, ACCOMPANIED BY A FOOTNOTE RE: ARCHITECTURE” at New York's Bohen Foundation in 2004. The installation included monumental paint chip-based paintings and sculptures made from colored paper, either stacked vertically or arrayed in horizontal, hedge-like rows.

Wegner followed in 2005 with "Lever Labyrinth," a human-scale maze composed of 2.2 million sheets of stacked paper––all in various shades of green, creating columns of subtly gradating color––constructed inside the Lever House building.

In 2008, Wegner executed the major paper installation "GUILLOTINE OF SUNLIGHT, GUILLOTINE OF SHADE" at the San Francisco Museum of Modern Art. The piece consisted of 1.4 millions sheets of die-cut paper in 40 hues, arranged to create two 12’ x 26.5’ x 7" color gradations inside the museum: a wall progressing from blue to yellow in one gallery, and a wall progressing from yellow to red in another.

Around this same time, Wegner introduced two new elements into his work: time and neon. He combined both in 2007 to create “THE UNITED STATES OF NOTHING,” which included time-controlled neon signage showing the name, latitude, and longitude of every U.S. city that invokes the concept of nothingness. Wegner arranged each neon unit according to its relative geography on a midnight blue-painted wall meant to stand in for the continental U.S.

=== Stanford University commission ===
Stanford University commissioned Wegner to create four permanent installations on the campus of its Graduate School of Business. In a Los Angeles Times feature on the works, arts writer Jori Finkel noted, that it was

"...an unusual project in many ways. Most public art is inserted into a landscape after the fact, but Wegner's artworks were integrated into the campus… And though most university art tends to be committee-sanctioned or boring, Wegner's suite of works for Stanford are thought-provoking in ways that his supporters have come to expect."

=== Kinetic works at Stanford ===
Completed in 2011, the quartet includes two kinetic works and two static works. The kinetic pieces include "WAYS TO CHANGE" and "MONUMENT TO CHANGE AS IT CHANGES." The former is a wall-sized (171" x 216" x 8") glass, steel, and LED display depicting hundreds of adverbs programmed to illuminate in pre-determined groupings on a continuous 90-minute loop. Finkel mentions that it was "built into the façade of an auditorium that had to be redesigned and re-permitted to accommodate its weight and behind-the-scenes apparatus," and that the work "could be seen to question the business school's—or business world's—emphasis on productivity. ‘It raises the question not of what you are doing, but how you are doing it,’ says the artist."

“MONUMENT TO CHANGE AS IT CHANGES" is an enormous (108" x 384" x 3") array of "flip-digit" modules of the variety used to announce arrivals and departures in European train stations––except instead of digits, each module contains 80 cards individually screen printed a different solid color. Wegner then programmed the entire array to animate through a continuous eight-hour cycle of constantly changing patterns. Wegner tells Finkel in the Times feature,

"The train signage arrives at a particular destination [visually], just as you would in a train, somewhere that's specific and recognizable. The way I've programmed the board there's never a moment of stasis or arrival—it's perpetual arrival."

=== Static works at Stanford ===
The two works static works in the commission are both

- "MONUMENT TO THE UNKNOWN VARIABLES" consists of the bracketed variables "[x]" and "[y]" formed into sets of wood and steel benches measuring 216" x 200" x 30" each. Finkel notes that "[t]hey could be read as a very short concrete poem about uncertainty. They are also for sitting on."
- , "MONUMENT TO THE FUTURE OF DREAMS," is a large (32" x 44" x 4") upright stone tablet placed at the campus's entrance and inscribed with the message, "DEDICATED TO THE THINGS THAT HAVEN'T HAPPENED YET AND THE PEOPLE WHO ARE ABOUT TO DREAM THEM UP…." Describing the genesis of the piece, Wegner tells Finkel that he "started thinking about what cornerstones signify—usually the moment of completion for a project. But what if instead of looking back over your shoulder, you were looking ahead?"

=== Later works ===
Wegner's next permanent installation was "HELL-WHISKEY-GUNS-MUD-MICHIGAN," completed in 2014 for Michigan State University. Similar to "THE UNITED STATES OF NOTHING" and "WAYS TO CHANGE," it uses an LED display to continuously cycle through pre-programmed groupings of text. Their subject matter is the place names and GPS coordinates of various locations in Michigan, which Wegner divides into categories such as verbs, colors, and historical figures; the program lasts two full hours before repeating, and the LEDs are partially covered by glass and wood veneer.

In 2014, Wegner also began concentrating on creating individual paintings again. His "Color Wheel" and "D65" series focus on color relationships played out over ring-shaped, wall mounted MDF in various diameters.

== Collections ==
- The Albright-Knox Art Gallery, Buffalo, New York
- The Folkwang Museum, Essen, Germany
- The J. Paul Getty Museum, Los Angeles, California
- The J. Paul Getty Research Institute, Los Angeles, California
- The Solomon R. Guggenheim Museum, New York City
- The Henry Art Gallery, Seattle, Washington
- The Los Angeles County Museum of Art, Los Angeles, California
- The Museum of Contemporary Art, Los Angeles, California
- The Museum der bildenden Künste, Leipzig, Germany
- The Museum of Modern Art, New York City
- The Museum of Modern Art Library, New York City
- The New York Public Library (Spencer Collection), New York City
- The Phoenix Art Museum, Arizona
- The San Francisco Museum of Modern Art, California
- The San Jose Museum of Art, California
- The Santa Barbara Museum of Art, California
- The United States State Department, Kabul, Afghanistan
- The Yale University Art Gallery, New Haven, Connecticut
- The Yale University Sterling Library Special Collection, New Haven, Connecticut

== Permanent installations ==
- HELL-WHISKEY-GUNS-MUD-MICHIGAN, Michigan State University, East Lansing, Michigan (2014)
- MONUMENT TO CHANGE AS IT CHANGES, Stanford University Graduate School of Business, Palo Alto, California (2011)
- MONUMENT TO CHANGE AS A VERB (THE ADVERB WALL), Stanford University Graduate School of Business, Palo Alto, California (2011)
- MONUMENT TO THE UNKNOWN VARIABLES, Stanford University Graduate School of Business, Palo Alto, California (2011)
- MONUMENT TO THE FUTURE OF DREAMS, Stanford University Graduate School of Business, Palo Alto, California (2011)

== Lectures ==
- The Stanford University MFA Program, Palo Alto, California (2013)
- TEDxEast, New York City
- The Museum of Contemporary Art, Chicago Illinois (2012)
- The Phoenix Art Museum, Arizona (2010)
- The University of Colorado Art Museum, Boulder, Colorado (2010)
- The Dunedin Public Art Gallery, New Zealand (2007)
- The American Academy in Berlin, Germany (2005)
- The Bohen Foundation, New York City (2004)
- Printed Matter, New York City (2002)
- The Cooper Union, New York City (2000)
- Art in General, New York City (1999)

== Artist's books and monographs ==
- BUILDINGS MADE OF SKY (2012)
- ON, OFF, VIA, VERSUS, BESIDE, BEYOND, DESPITE, CONCERNING & UP AGAINST: THE WALL (2010)
- TERRA FIRMA INCOGNITA (2009)
- P,E,T,E,R,W,E,G,N,E,R, (2007)
- LEVER LABYRINTH (2005)
- A,N,S,W,E,R,S,&,Q,U,E,S,T,I,O,N,S, (2004)
- THE OTHER TODAY (2002)
- PETER WEGNER, 11" x 8 1/2" x 3/8," offset litho on coated paper, 128 pages bound, ed. 1000, 2001 (2001)
- THE BLUE BOOKS (1998)
- REMARKS ON COLOR (1997)
- AMERICAN TYPES (1997)

== Exhibitions and projects ==
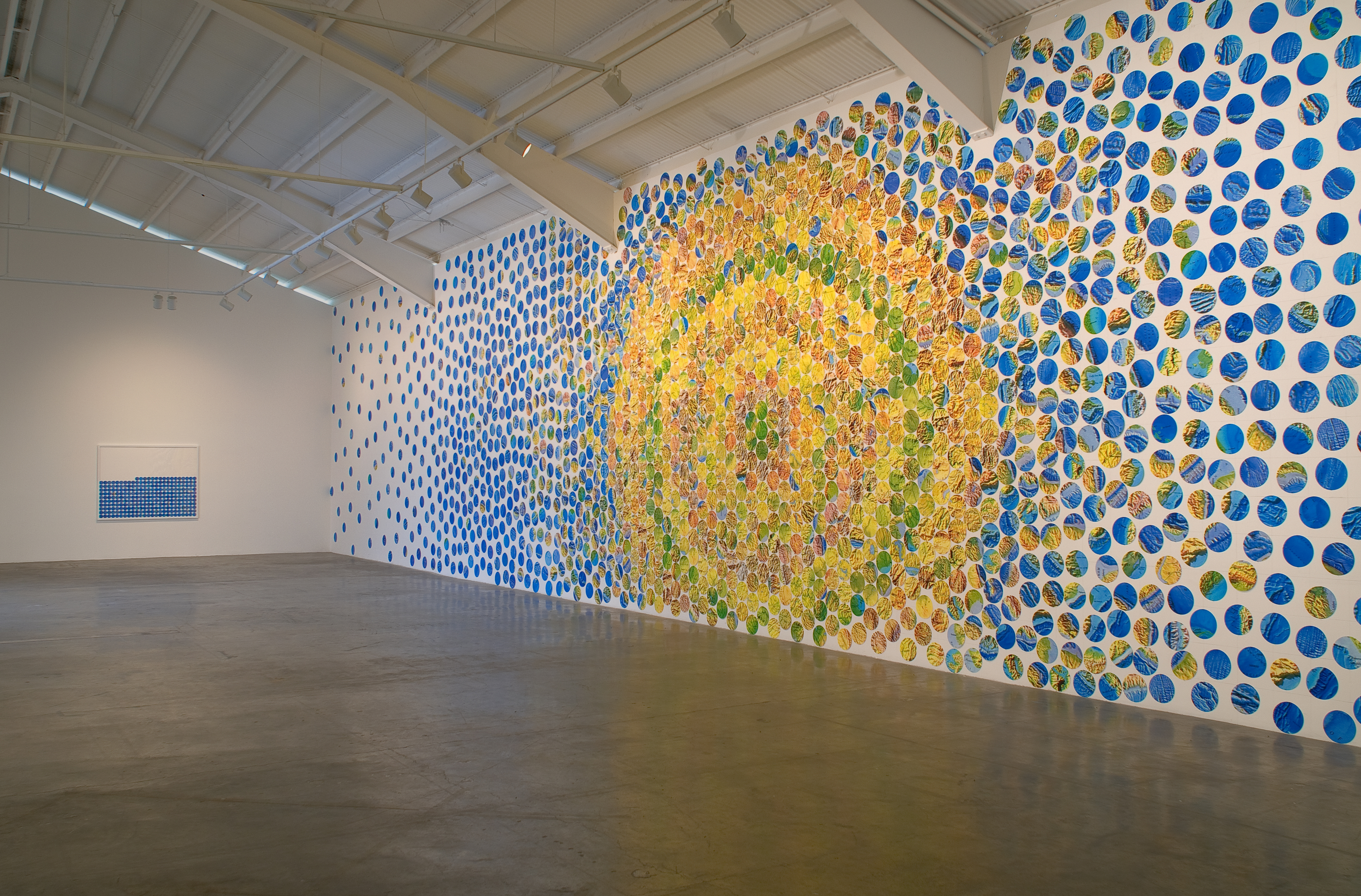
Installation view of Wegner show "Terra Firma Incognita" at William Griffin Gallery. Photographed by William Griffin Gallery

- "In Focus: Architecture," The J. Paul Getty Museum, Los Angeles, California (2013)
- "Kubus: Peter Wegner," Museum der bildenden Künste Leipzig, Germany (2012)
- "Skyscraper: Art & Architecture Against Gravity," Museum of Contemporary Art, Chicago, Illinois (2012)
- "ParaDesign," San Francisco Museum of Modern Art, California (2011)
- "THE UNITED STATES OF NOTHING," The San Francisco Museum of Modern Art, California (2010)
- "In [ ] Veritas," The San Francisco Museum of Modern Art, California (2010)
- "How Wine Became Modern," San Francisco Museum of Modern Art, California (2010)
- "The More Things Change," San Francisco Museum of Modern Art, California (2010)
- "Wall-to-Wall-to-Wall," CU Art Museum, Boulder, Colorado (2010)
- "Brave W [The Winnebago Project]," The University of Colorado Art Museum, Boulder, Colorado (2010)
- "archiTECHtonica," The University of Colorado Art Museum, Boulder, Colorado (2010)
- "New Art for a New Century: Contemporary Acquisitions, 2000–2010," Orange County Museum of Art, Newport Beach, California (2010)
- "Machine for Living Color," Museum of Modern Art Library, New York City (2008)
- "247 and Counting: Recent Architecture and Design Acquisitions," San Francisco Museum of Modern Art, California (2008)
- "Cut: Revealing the Section," San Francisco Museum of Modern Art, California (2008)
- "Terra Firma Incognita," Dunedin Public Art Gallery, New Zealand (2007)
- "Selections from the Permanent Collection," Yale University Art Gallery, New Haven, Connecticut (2006)
- "Lever Labyrinth," Lever House, New York City (2005)
- "Extreme Abstraction," Albright-Knox Art Gallery, Buffalo, New York (2005)
- "PETER WEGNER: COMPLETE & FINAL COLOR THEORY SUPERSEDING ALL PREVIOUS THEORIES & PRE-EMPTING ALL FUTURE THEORIES WITH ADD’L THOUGHTS ON THE POETRY OF COMMERCE, THE CRUELTY OF SYSTEMS & THE BANALITY OF THE GRID, ACCOMPANIED BY A FOOTNOTE RE: ARCHITECTURE," Bohen Foundation, New York City (2004)
- "Amerika – Europa: Ein künstlerischer Dialog," Von der Heydt-Museum, Wuppertal, Germany (2002)
- "Auswärts – Werke aus der Sammlung Rosenkranz," Universität Witten/Herdecke, Germany (2002)
- "Objective Color," Yale University Art Gallery, New Haven, Connecticut (2001)
- "Of the Moment," San Francisco Museum of Modern Art, California (2000)
- "Re-drawing the Line," Art in General, New York City (2000)
- "Hands on Color," Bellevue Arts Museum, Washington (1999)
- "Re: structure," Bucksbaum Center for the Arts, Grinnell, Iowa (1999)
- "Then and Now and Later: Art Since 1945 at Yale," Yale University Art Gallery, New Haven, Connecticut (1998)
- "Art of Four Decades," San Francisco Museum of Modern Art, California (1998)

== Press ==
- "Palaces Made of Sky," Il Post, Italy, January 12, 2015 (feature, illus.)
- Adrian Lobe, "I Explore the Urban Maze," Wiener Zeitung, Vienna, Austria, May 26, 2014
- Liz Stinson, "The Secret Cities Hidden Between NYC Skyscrapers," Wired, February 20, 2014 (illus.)
- Mark Byrnes, "These Mind-Bending Pictures Turn Manhattan's Sky into Skyscrapers," The Atlantic: City Lab, February 10, 2014 (feature, illus.)
- Paul Petrunia, "In Focus: Peter Wegner," Archinect, February 3, 2014 (interview, illus.)
- "Buildings Made of Sky: Photographer Peter Wegner Inverts New York Skyline," Huffington Post (UK), January 25, 2014 (illus.)
- Alexi Drosu, "Exhibitions: Architecture in Photographs," Form Magazine, October 14, 2013
- Julie Grahame, "Peter Wegner's Building Made of Sky," Magical Urbanism, March 13, 2012
- Fanny L'Eglise, "Peter Wegner: Buildings Made of Sky," L'architecture D'aujourd'hui, March 2012
- Jori Finkel, "Peter Wegner at Stanford: The Art of Innovation," The Los Angeles Times, May 22, 2011
- ON, OFF, VIA, VERSUS, BESIDE, BEYOND, DESPITE, CONCERNING & UP AGAINST: THE WALL, Essay by Lisa Tamiris Becker. Published by Cu Art Museum, University of Colorado, Boulder, 2010
- Bill Wyman, "Installing a Major New Work at the Phoenix Art Museum", Phxated.com, November 25, 2009
- Leah Ollman, "Peter Wegner at Griffin," Art in America, October 2009
- Ara H. Merjian, "Cut: Revealing the Section", ArtForum, April 2008
- Cynthia Houng, "10 Questions for Peter Wegner," KQED Interview, May 30, 2008
- Glen Helfand, "Spatial Explorations," The Architect's Newspaper, April 30, 2008
- Ken Johnson, "Peter Wegner: ‘Lever Labyrinth,’" The New York Times, September 2, 2005
- Susan Cross, "Peter Wegner at Lever House," The New Yorker, August 8 & 15, 2005
- Noah Chasin, "Reading Room," ArtReview, July 2005
- Tanja Dückers, "To See in the Middle of Yellow," Die Tageszeitung, Berlin, Germany, March 31, 2005 (illus.)
- Andrea Scott, "Peter Wegner at Henry Urbach Architecture," The New Yorker, December 6, 2004
- Matthew Guy Nichols, "Peter Wegner at The Bohen Foundation," Art in America, October 2004
- Noah Chasin, "Peter Wegner at The Bohen Foundation," Time Out New York, May 26, 2004
- Christopher Knight, "Mass, Volume and Air, by Wegner," Los Angeles Times, May 14, 2004
- Kim Levin, "Peter Wegner at The Bohen Foundation," Village Voice, May 6, 2004
- Martha Schwendener, "Peter Wegner at the Bohen Foundation," The New Yorker, April 19–26, 2004
- Cathy Lang Ho, "Color-Coded," The Architect's Newspaper, April 6, 2004
- Eve Meltzer, "Peter Wegner," Frieze, September 2002 (illus.)
- Charles Merewether, Sabine Fehlemann (eds.), Sammlung Rosenkranz, Von der Heydt Museum, Wuppertal, Germany. Exhibition catalog. 2002

== Personal life ==
He currently lives and works in Berkeley, California.
