= William Griffin Gallery =

Contemporary art gallery in Santa Monica, California

William Griffin Gallery was a contemporary art gallery located in Santa Monica, California, which operated between 1997-2011. In 2011, Griffin merged with Jim Corcoran and Maggie Kayne to create a new gallery, Kayne Griffin Corcoran.

== History ==
The gallery was established in 1997 by William Griffin. In 2003 the gallery relocated from Venice to a 10,000-square-foot (930 m^{2}) space in Santa Monica. The gallery's newer space was located at 2902 Nebraska Avenue, adjacent to Olympic Blvd. The building was constructed during the aeronautics boom in the 1950s as a manufacturing plant for Douglas Aircraft and has 25-foot (7.6 m) ceilings and four distinct galleries.

In addition to exhibitions, William Griffin Gallery facilitated artist projects in leading museums, foundations, universities, and galleries around the world. The gallery had helped realize public art projects with artists such as James Turrell, Ai Weiwei, and Richard Long. In addition, the gallery had both independently produced and directly supported the publication of numerous artist book projects, catalogs, and monographs.

== Exhibitions ==
William Griffin Gallery featured solo exhibitions by James Turrell, Richard Long, Robert Rauschenberg, David Lynch, Ed Ruscha, Richard Serra, Tony Smith, Peter Wegner, Greg Colson, Liza Ryan and others. It had presented group exhibitions such as Early California Minimalism, a survey of significant early works by Robert Irwin, John McCracken, and Craig Kauffman; and Wall Installations, with works by Maya Lin, James Turrell, Richard Long, Robert Therrien, Teresita Fernández, Karin Sander, Peter Wegner, and Kira Lynn Harris. It has also presented projects of work by Richard Tuttle, Ana Mendieta, Donald Judd and Josef Albers.

== Gallery ==
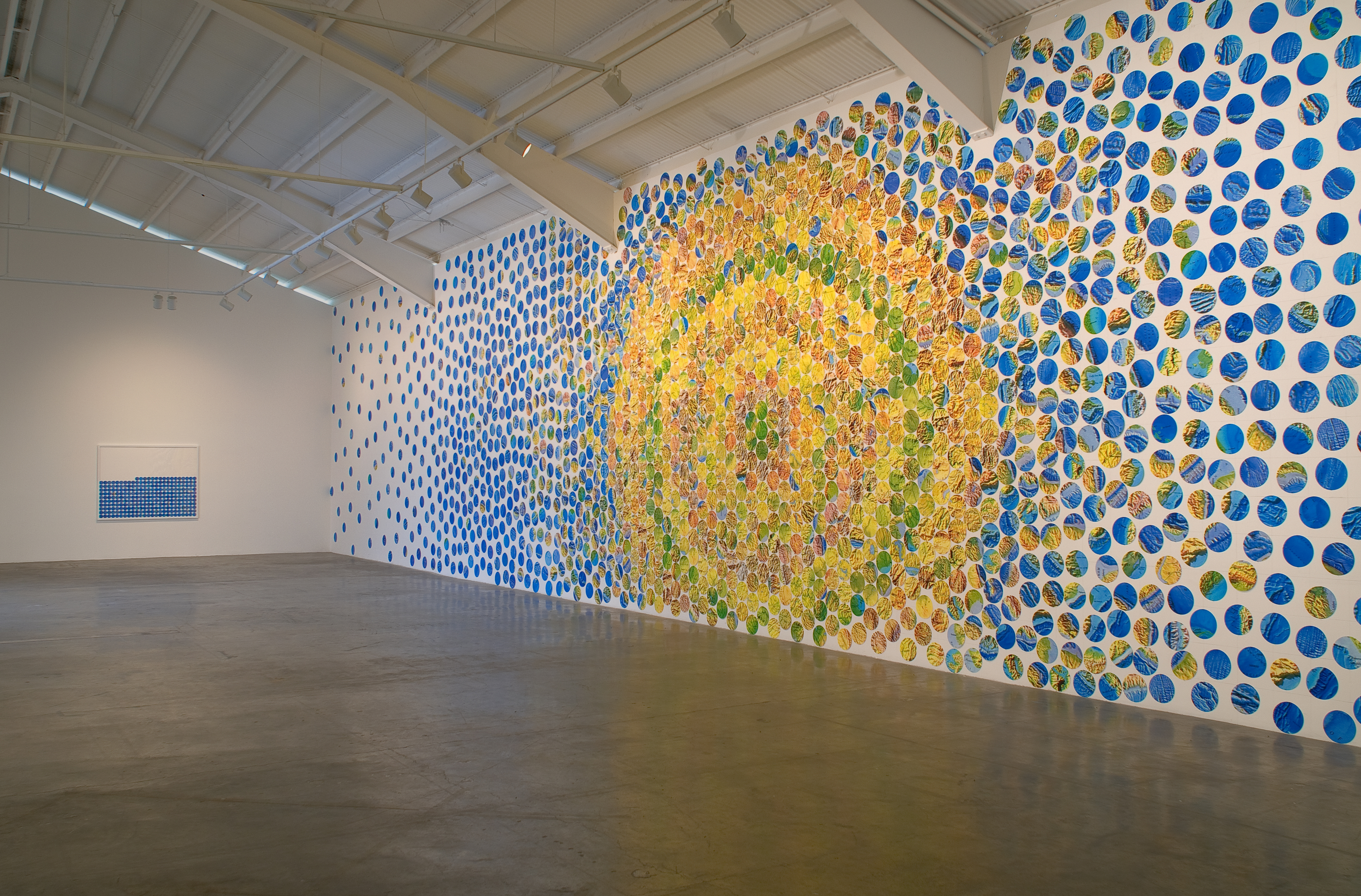
Installation view of Wegner show "Terra Firma Incognita"
