= Mary Obering =

American painter (1937–2022)

- Born: 1937; Shreveport, Louisiana, U.S.
- Died: July 29, 2022 (aged 85); New York, U.S.
- Known for: Abstract art
- Website: www.maryobering.com

Mary Obering (1937 – July 29, 2022) was an American painter focusing mainly on geometric abstraction.

== Early life and education ==
Obering was born in Shreveport, Louisiana in 1937. When Obering was a teenager, she visited Italy for the first time – the formative trip introduced her to art and Renaissance painting, an experience that Obering said "was always in the back of [her] mind."

Obering received her BA in psychology from Hollins University in Roanoke, Virginia in 1959. Later that year, she attended graduate school for psychology at Radcliffe College, studying under noted behavioral psychologist B.F. Skinner, who taught at Harvard University at the time.

Obering then moved to New York City to work for CBS, where she studied at the Art Students League. In the mid-1960s she moved again, this time to Denver with her husband and young daughter and received an MFA from the University of Denver in 1971.

== Style and technique ==
Obering began in sculpture, but soon moved into painting. Her first paintings were Color Field paintings, inspired by Mark Rothko. Obering continued to work in abstraction, while incorporating techniques, such as gilded wood panels, that are reminiscent of early Italian art. Critics have also described her work as looking like "an exotic form of sculpture."

== Exhibitions ==
In September 2018, Obering had a solo exhibition in Los Angeles at Kayne Griffin Corcoran where she exhibited acrylic on canvas paintings from the 1970s. Obering is represented by both Kayne Griffin Corcoran in Los Angeles and Bortolami in New York.

=== Selected Exhibition History ===
==== Group ====
- Denver Art Museum, 1969
- Whitney Museum of American Art, New York (Biennial), 1975
- Museum of Contemporary Art, Denver, 2002
- Robin Rule Gallery of Contemporary Art, Denver, 2003

==== Solo ====
- Great Western United Galleries, Denver, 1971
- University of Denver Galleries, Denver, 1971
- Artists Space, New York, 1973
- Soho Center for the Visual Arts, New York 1973
- Interart Gallery, New York, 1981
- Julian Pretto Gallery, San Jose, Costa Rica, 1983
- Jan Turner Gallery, Los Angeles, California, 1990
- Julian Pretto Gallery, New York 1990
- Plus-Kern Gallery, Brussels, Belgium 1991
- Julian Pretto Gallery, New York 1991
- Jan Turner Gallery, Los Angeles 1992
- Julian Pretto Gallery, New York 1993
- Jan Turner Gallery, Los Angeles, California, 1994
- Galerie Hugo Minnen, Antwerp, Belgium, 1994
- Littlejohn/Sternau Gallery, New York, 1995
- Primo Piano, Rome, Italy, 1996
- Robin Rule Modern and Contemporary Art, Denver, 1996
- Hugo Minnen Gallery, Antwerp, Belgium, 1997
- Robin Rule Modern and Contemporary Art, Denver, 1999
- Marfa Hotel, Marfa, Texas, 2000
- Gallery 668, Greenwich, New York, 2001
- Ninni Esposito Arte Contemporanea, Bari Italy, 2001
- Rule Modern and Contemporary Art, Denver, 2003
- Gallery 668 Greenwich, New York, 2004
- Studio G7 Bologna, Italy, 2006
- Ninni Esposito Arte Conteporanea, Bari, Italy, 2007

== Personal life and death ==
Obering died in New York City on July 29, 2022, at the age of 85.
