= Kayne Griffin Corcoran =

Contemporary art gallery in Los Angeles, California

Kayne Griffin is a contemporary art gallery based in Los Angeles. The gallery represents and works with artists such as James Turrell, Mary Corse, David Lynch, Tomoharu Murakami, Peter Shire, Rosha Yaghmai, Jiro Takamatsu, Anthony Hernandez, Mika Tajima, Mary Obering, Liza Ryan, Hank Willis Thomas, Llyn Foulkes and Beverly Pepper.

== History and gallery space ==
Created in 2011, the gallery was founded under the creative leadership of Maggie Kayne (daughter of investor Richard Kayne) with the market guidance of Bill Griffin and James Corcoran. Prior to the merger, both Griffin and Corcoran owned their own separate galleries – William Griffin Gallery and James Corcoran Gallery, respectively – both located in Santa Monica, California. Kayne Griffin Corcoran was conceived through a meeting between Griffin, Corcoran, and Kayne (who at the time was a collector and advisor) to discuss a James Turrell Skyspace commission. In a 2019 interview with Griffin and Kayne, the partners expressed that they believe the gallery's programming reflects a spirit of cross-generational collaboration, a shared commitment to Los Angeles culture and history, and dedication to supporting both established and emerging contemporary artists.

In 2013, the gallery relocated from Santa Monica to Mid-City West, opening a 15,000 square foot gallery on S La Brea Avenue. In 2014, the building design by Standard Architecture was awarded the World Architecture News award for adaptive reuse. The 1940s bow string truss warehouse was transformed in to a gallery space, while the asphalt parking area was converted to a landscaped forecourt with grass, patios, and a steel trellis covered in creeping fig and flowering Bougainvillea. Inside, the building integrates major permanent installations by artist James Turrell, including skylights along the main gallery and a Skyspace in the conference room.

In 2022, Kayne Griffin announced its merging with Pace Gallery; through the partnership, the gallery's space became Pace’s flagship space on the West Coast.

== Exhibitions and artists ==
Kayne Griffin Corcoran opened its new South La Brea gallery in May 2013 with a historical survey of James Turrell’s work related to Roden Crater, including drawings, photographs, models, as well as notes, tools, and architectural plans. The gallery has also featured exhibitions of Turrell’s Glass works, which are wall installations each unique in shape and size incorporating a distinct timed composition of color transitions. As art historian Suzanne Hudson notes in an Artforum review, the works in his 2018 exhibition at the gallery cycle through “thousands of hues in subtle, hypnotic metamorphoses… cast[ing] shadows of chartreuse and orange, magenta and pale blue, biding their time.

The gallery’s first exhibition of works by Mary Corse included The Cold Room, an immersive environment in which a wireless light box hangs in near-freezing temperatures. After first conceiving of the piece in 1968, Corse struggled to find the space and financing for the work, only fully realizing the project years later at Kayne Griffin Corcoran in 2017.

Italy-based American artist Beverly Pepper’s 2017 debut exhibition at Kayne Griffin Corcoran was also her first major solo exhibition in Los Angeles. The exhibition featured works spanning her nearly 60-year career, including large scale Cor-ten steel sculptural works, along with smaller sculptures made of stone and Carrara marble. As KCRW Art Talk critic Edward Goldman describes, the exhibition “was a rare combination of brutality and elegance, machismo and grace… [Pepper’s] sculptures, with their minimalistic geometric forms, have an unexpectedly theatrical effect.”
