= Beverly Pepper =

American sculptor and painter (1922–2020)

- Beverly Pepper at work in Italy in 1960. Photo by Curtis Bill Pepper
- Born: Beverly Stoll; December 20, 1922; New York City, New York, U.S.
- Died: February 5, 2020 (aged 97); Todi, Italy
- Education: Pratt Institute, Art Students' League, Brooklyn College
- Known for: Painter, Sculptor
- Spouse: Curtis Bill Pepper
- Website: beverlypepper.net

Beverly Pepper (née Stoll; December 20, 1922 – February 5, 2020) was an American sculptor known for her monumental works, site specific and land art. She remained independent from any particular art movement. She lived in Italy, primarily in Todi, since the 1950s.

== Early life and education ==
Pepper was born Beverly Stoll on December 20, 1922, in Brooklyn, New York City. Her parents were Jewish immigrants, Beatrice (Hornstein) and Irwin Stoll. She grew up with a father who was a furrier, and sold carpet and linoleum, and a mother who was a volunteer for the National Association for the Advancement of Colored People (NAACP). "It was an interesting household," she said in an interview. "You see, I wasn’t brought up thinking I had to be a 'feminine’ woman.' Her mother and grandmother had strong personalities, which convinced her she could make her own life far from Brooklyn. "There was nothing I ever thought would limit me because my mother and grandmother were very strong women. I didn’t know that’s not how women acted!"

At sixteen, she entered the Pratt Institute in Brooklyn, New York, to study advertising design, photography, and industrial design. She then embarked on a career as a commercial art director. She studied at the Art Students League of New York and attended night classes at Brooklyn College, including art theory with György Kepes, who introduced her to the work of László Moholy-Nagy and Man Ray. It was at this time, in her mid 20s, that she met the environmental artist Frederick Kiesler. Drawn to post-war Europe in 1949, she studied painting in Paris at the Académie de la Grande Chaumière. There she attended classes with cubist painter André Lhote, and with Fernand Léger at his atelier. She also visited the studios of Ossip Zadkine and Brâncuși.

== Work ==
Pepper first started her career as a painter. She turned to sculpture after taking a trip in 1960 to Angkor Wat, Cambodia, where the temple ruins surviving beneath the jungle growth filled her with awe. She made her debut in 1962 with an exhibit of carved tree trunks at a gallery in Rome.

Pepper introduced her sculptural vocabulary with integrations of wood carvings and metal castings. Art critic, Rosalind Krauss has described her work as violating modernist traditions: "the traditional craft of carving was closed to her ... she attacked these logs with electric drills and saws." After several exhibitions in New York and Rome, she was one of 10 artists invited by Giovanni Carandente, with David Smith, Alexander Calder, Arnaldo Pomodoro, Lynn Chadwick, and Pietro Consagra, to fabricate works in Italsider factories in Italy for an outdoor exhibition, Sculture nella città, held in Spoleto during the summer of 1962. Working directly in the factory, as she would with subsequent major sculptures, Pepper created The Gift of Icarus, Leda, Spring Landscape, two other large works, and 17 smaller ones.

As the 1960s progressed, Pepper experimented using polished stainless steel. In some of the first works, one of her methods involved using a torch to carve used one-inch thick elements of stainless steel. From there, her pieces evolved into highly polished stainless with painted interiors. They are illusionary works that disappear and reappear, mirroring the surrounding landscape. In an interview with the art historian, Barbara Rose, Pepper said "Another effect I'm trying to obtain with this bright finish is not simply illusion, but the inclusion of the person looking at it, so that there's a constant exchange going on between the viewer and the work ... My aim here is to invest space with a solidity by filling it with the world around it."

All of Pepper's sculptures from the beginning of her sculptural career were displayed outdoors. Eventually, she began her experiments using earth to contain a sculpture. "In the seventies I developed the concept of 'Earthbound Sculptures', that is sculptures seemingly born in or rising up from the earth." Becoming more involved with her native New York in the 1970s, her progressive ideas became realized in commissions such as her seminal work Amphisculpture (1974–1976). Furthering her experience in steel, throughout this time period she used Cor-ten steel. While working at a U.S. steel factory in Conshohocken, Pennsylvania, she was given Cor-ten steel. Relishing the exposed rusted surfaces of Cor-ten, she made pieces like Dallas Land Canal (1971–1975). She was, in fact, one of the first artists, if not the first, to incorporate Cor-Ten steel into sculpture. Beginning in the 1970s, and until her death, she lived a bi-continental life traveling between Europe and the United States.

Later in the 1980s and 1990s, Pepper made works such as Cromlech Glen (restored in 2003), Palengenesis (1993–94) and Sol i Ombra, (1987–1992). The works blend nature with industrial materials, as well as inviting the viewer to be a part of the work – "a total environment." Palengenesis exhibits her fascination with cast iron during this period. Barbara Rose explains: "The theme of Palengenesis is of one element born from another, expressed by a sequence of vertical elements that gradually separate from a wall that generates them. The vertical elements progressively become detached from their context as children individualize themselves from a parent. Pepper focused on the themes of genesis and continuity which centers Pepper's iconography." In the Barcelona park, Sol I Ombra, the reflective seductive stainless steel of her earlier works morphed into a ceramic structure, Cel Caigut. Rose suggests "Cel Caigut is content–specific as well as site-specific. In an homage to Gaudi, the great turn-of-the-century Catalan architect, Pepper covered the earth mound with shimmering ceramic tile, the material Gaudi used in his famous Park Guell." Recently, Pepper completed another park project for the city of Calgary, Alberta, Canada, Calgary Sentinels and Hawk Hill (2008–2010). Pepper said, "I believe my work offers a place for reflection and contemplative thought within the context of active urban environments."

Pepper created her studio in the "green heart" of a medieval hill town in Umbria, Italy. She was represented by Marlborough Gallery, as well as Kayne Griffin Corcoran, who presented the first major Los Angeles solo exhibition of her work in 2017.

Pepper said in a 2013 Sculpture magazine interview, "I live in the present but draw from the past, both within the back of the mind and within the substrates of history. Counting on a future is too problematic. In these controversial times, it’s hard to believe that we will survive. So I focus on the present as projected from the past. I think that my works end up 'knowing' more than I can about the future".

Pepper died on February 5, 2020, in her home in Todi at 97 years.

== Personal life ==
She married Lawrence Gussin in 1941; they were divorced in 1948. In 1948 she married writer Curtis Bill Pepper and their marriage lasted until his death in 2014. They had two children: the Pulitzer Prize-winning poet Jorie Graham, and the photographer, director, and actor John Randolph Pepper. Jorie Graham addressed human frailty and family challenges in her 2017 book Fast. Aging, sickness, the decline of her parents, as well as her own cancer diagnosis pockmarked this slim volume.

== Exhibitions and collected pieces ==
Pepper's works have been exhibited and collected by major museums and galleries throughout the world, including:

- DeCordova Museum and Sculpture Park, Lincoln, Massachusetts
- The Metropolitan Museum of Art, New York
- The Whitney Museum of American Art, New York
- Brooklyn Museum of Art, Brooklyn, New York
- The Albright-Knox Art Gallery, Buffalo, New York
- The Hirshhorn Museum and Sculpture Garden
- The Western Washington University Public Sculpture Collection, Bellingham, Washington
- The Smithsonian American Art Museum, Washington, D.C.
- The Walker Art Center, Minneapolis, Minnesota
- The San Francisco Museum of Modern Art, California
- Denver Art Museum, Colorado
- The Georgia Museum of Art, Athens, Georgia
- The Gori Collection, Pistoia, Italy
- Museu d'Art Contemporari de Barcelona, Barcelona, Spain
- Laumeier Sculpture Park, St. Louis, Missouri
- Grounds for Sculpture, Hamilton, New Jersey
- Frederik Meijer Gardens & Sculpture Park, Grand Rapids Township, Michigan
- The Governor Nelson A. Rockefeller Empire State Plaza Art Collection, Albany, NY
- Olympic Sculpture Park, Seattle, Washington
- Art Omi, Ghent, New York

== Recognition ==
Throughout the years, Pepper received several awards, including: Doctor of Fine Arts, Alumni Achievement Award and the Legends Award, from the Pratt Institute; Doctor of Fine Arts, The Maryland Institute; Accademico di Merito, University of Perugia; Cittadinanza Onoraria, Todi, Italy: Amic de Barcelona, city of Barcelona, Spain; Chevalier de l'Ordre des Arts et des Lettres, France and The Alexander Calder Prize. Pepper along with Nancy Holt was a recipient of the International Sculpture Center's 2013 Lifetime Achievement in Contemporary Sculpture Award. She was selected as a 1994 honoree for the 1994 Women's Caucus for Art Convention held in New York City.

In 2016 Pepper donated her personal archives to the Frederik Meijer Gardens & Sculpture Park in Grand Rapids. The archives contain nearly 900 works which consist of sketchbooks, drawings, other works on paper.

== Gallery ==
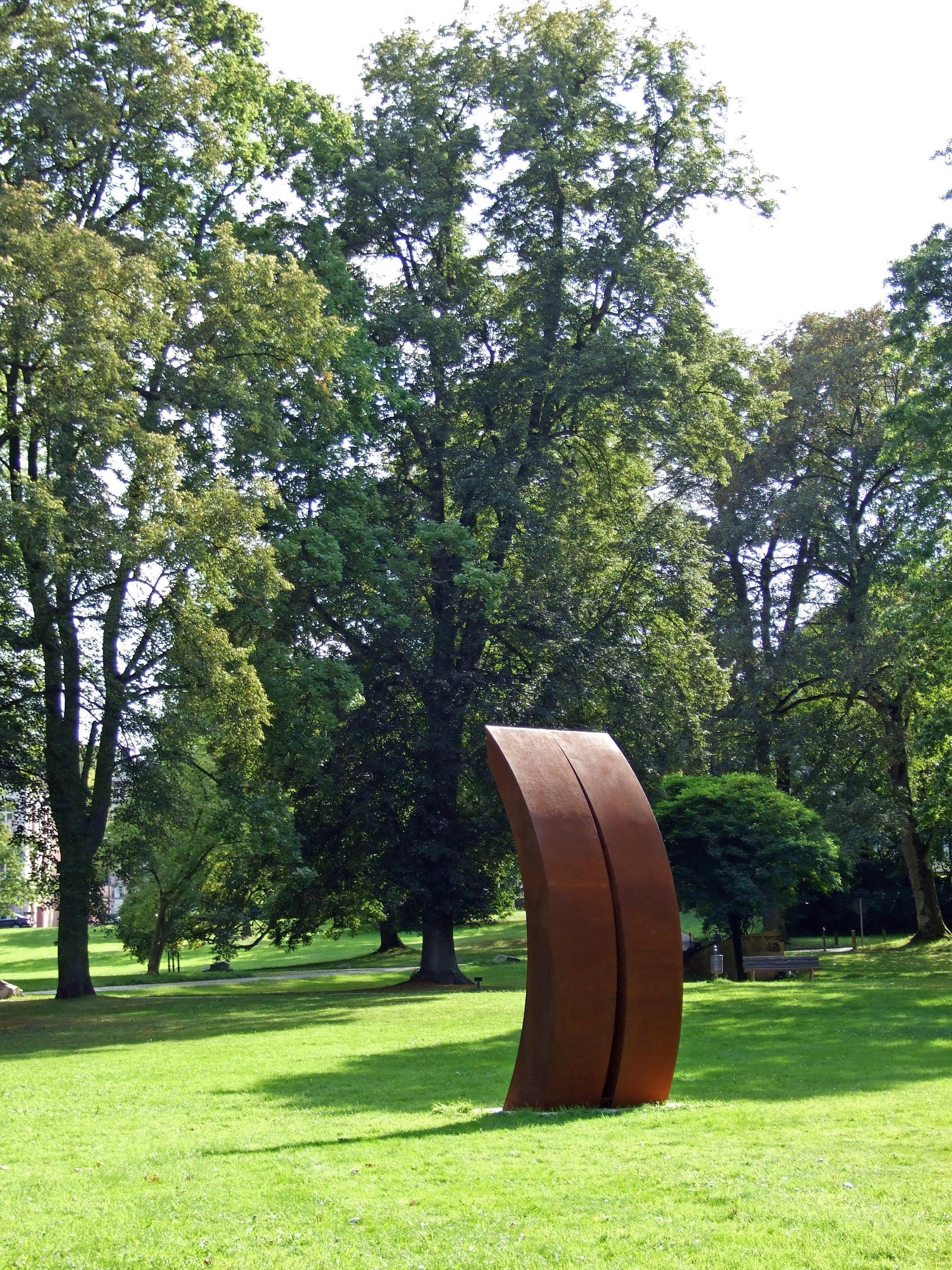
Longo Monolith

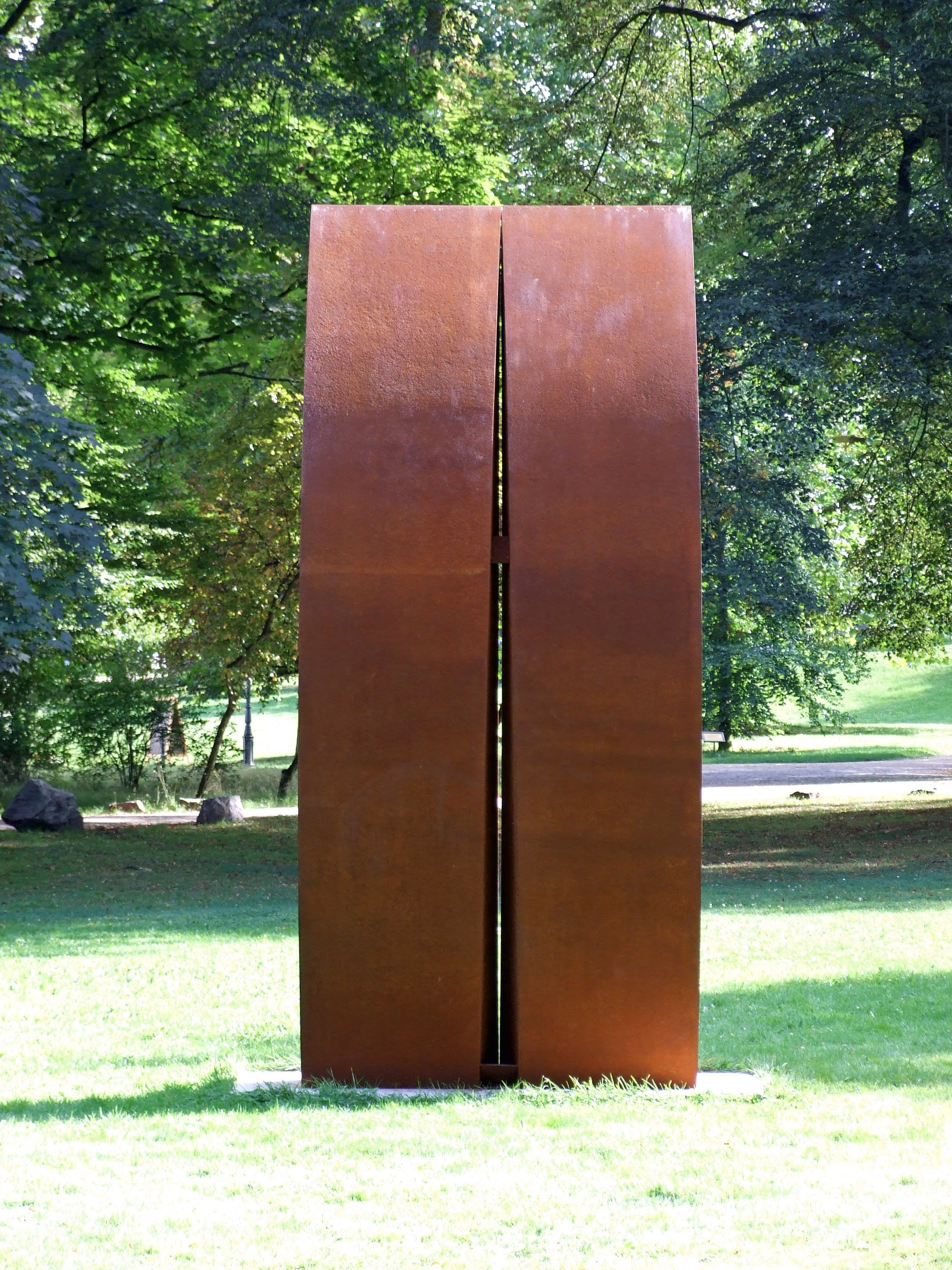
Longo Monolith

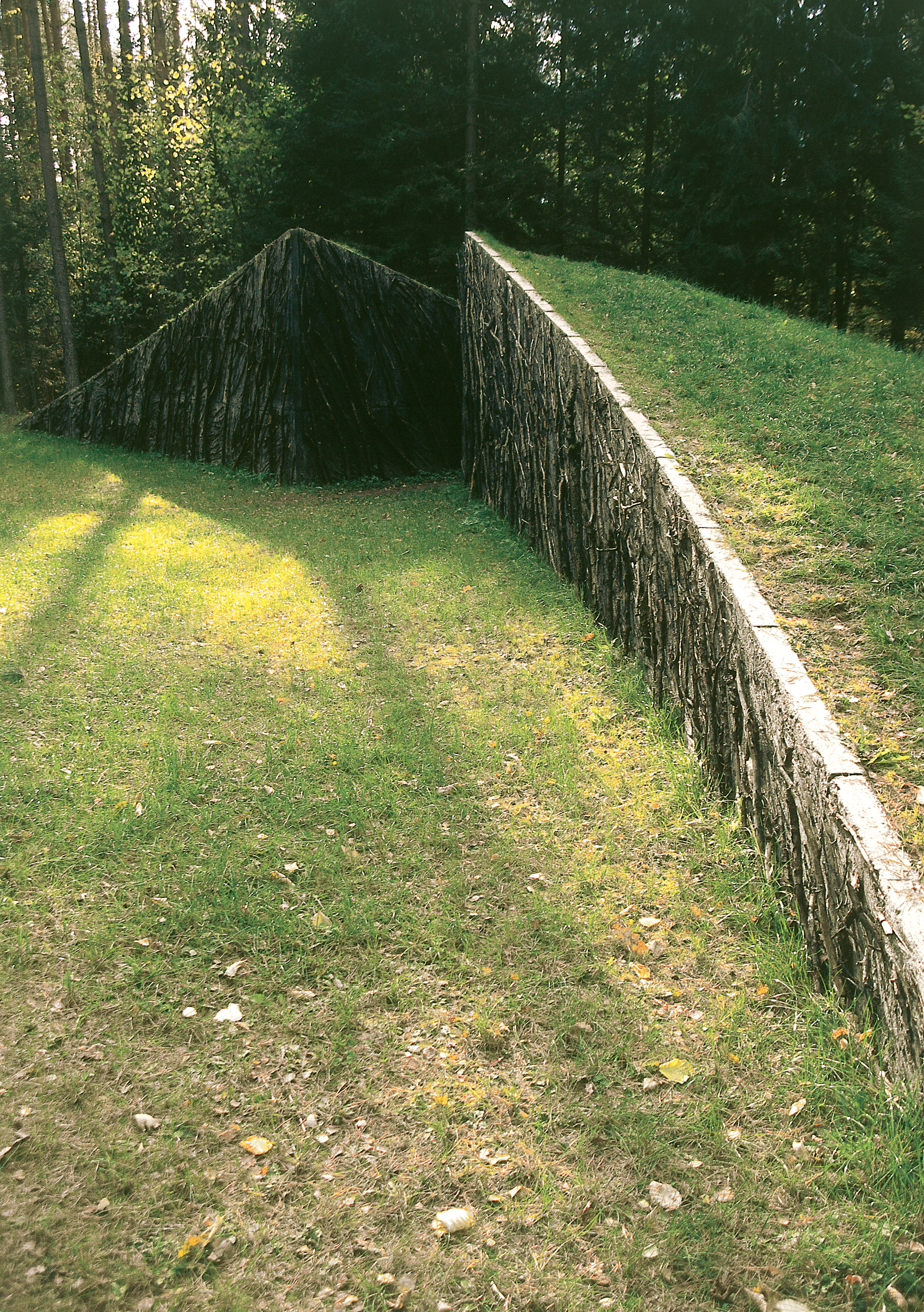
Departure: For My Grandmother, Europos Parkas, Lithuania

== See also ==
- Bedford Sentinels, Stanford University
- Split Ritual at the U.S. National Arboretum
