= List of James Turrell artworks =

This is a list of artworks made by James Turrell. Works are listed on the chart by chronology, the oldest first to the newest at the bottom.

== Light and space ==
Title	Year	Location and coordinates	Material	Owner
Afrum I (White)	1967			
Prado (White)	1967			
Tycho (White)	1967			
Stufe (White)	1967			
Raethro (White)	1967			
Prado (White)	1967			
Pullen (White)	1967			
Porter Powell (White)	1967			
Enzu	1967			
Decker	1967			
Catzo (White)	1967			
Ashby	1967			
Carn White	1967			
Shanta II (Blue)	1970	National Gallery of Australia, Canberra, Australian Capital Territory, Australia	Fluorescent light, Built Space	
Four Light Installations: Iltar, Amba, Rayzor, House of Wax	1982	Center on Contemporary Art (CoCA), Seattle, Washington, United States	Drywall, paint, incandescent light	
Avaar:	1982 (on display 2022-2027 at Castkill Art Space, Livingston Manor, NY; on loan from Seattle Art Museum			
First Light	1989-1990			
Sky Garden	1992	Liss Ard Estate Garden, Skibbereen, Co. Cork, Ireland		
Aten Reign	2013	Guggenheim Museum, Manhattan, New York City, New York, United States		
Catso, Red (1967)	1994	The Mattress Factory Art Museum, Pittsburgh, Pennsylvania, United States	Drywall, paint, xenon projector	
Pleiades	1983	The Mattress Factory Art Museum, Pittsburgh, Pennsylvania, United States	Drywall, paint, incandescent light	
Danaë	1983	The Mattress Factory Art Museum, Pittsburgh, Pennsylvania, United States	Drywall, paint, ultraviolet & incandescent light	
Celestial Vault	1996	Kijkduin, The Hague, the Netherlands		
Akhob	2013	The Shops at Crystals, Las Vegas, Nevada, United States	Drywall, paint, ultraviolet & incandescent light	
Soros Fund Management	2015	Soros Family Office, New York, NY, United States	George Soros Family office contains a Turrell room for its employees. 400 W 59th St #4, New York, NY 10019	

== Skyspace locations ==
Title	Year	Location and coordinates	Material	Details	Owner
Skyspace I	1974	Panza Collection, Varese, Italy		Originally located at the Guggenheim in NYC	Panza Collection, Varese, Italy
Lunette	1974	Panza Collection, Varese, Italy		Originally located at the Guggenheim in NYC	Panza Collection, Varese, Italy
Meeting	1986	MoMA PS1, Queens, New York City, New York, United States			MoMA PS1, Queens, New York City, New York, United States
Second Meeting	1989	Einstein Residence, Brentwood, California, United States		20-foot-tall	Cliff and Mandy Einstein
Space That Sees	1992	Israel Museum, Jerusalem, Israel		Gray and white concrete, limestone, fluorescent light with dimmers, 700 x 1000 x 1000 cm	Israel Museum, Jerusalem, Israel (Gift of Hannelore and Ruda Schulhof, New York, to American Friends of the Israel Museum)
House of Light	1997	House of Light, Tokamachi, Japan			House of Light, Tokamachi, Japan
6 M Skyspace	1998	Museum of Modern Art, Antwerp, Belgium			Museum of Modern Art, Antwerp, Belgium
Blue Blood	1998	Center for Contemporary Arts, Santa Fe, New Mexico, United States		Currently closed to the public while awaiting refurbishment and repairs	Center for Contemporary Arts, Santa Fe, New Mexico
Blue Pesher	1999	Carell Woodland Sculpture trail, Cheekwood Botanical Garden and Museum of Art, Nashville, Tennessee, United States			Cheekwood Botanical Garden and Museum of Art, Nashville, Tennessee, United States
Tewlwolow Kernow	1999	Tremenheere Sculpture Gardens, Cornwall, United Kingdom			Tremenheere Sculpture Gardens, Cornwall, United Kingdom
The Light Inside	1999	Museum of Fine Arts, Houston, Texas, United States			Museum of Fine Arts, Houston, Texas, United States
One Accord	2001	Live Oak Friends Meeting House, Houston, Texas, United States		Architect: Leslie Elkins	Houston, Texas, United States
Knight Rise	2001	Scottsdale Museum of Contemporary Art, Scottsdale, Arizona, United States			Scottsdale Museum of Contemporary Art, Scottsdale, Arizona, United States
Unseen Blue	2002	James Turrell Museum, Bodega Colomé, Salta, Argentina			James Turrell Museum, Bodega Colomé, Salta, Argentina
Plato's Eye	2002	Private Residence: Vernon Faulconer, Dallas, Texas			Vernon Faulconer
Lunette	2002	James Turrell Museum, Bodega Colome, Argentina			James Turrell Museum, Bodega Colome, Argentina
Milk Run Sky	2002	Contemporary Art Museum Kumamoto, Kumamoto, Japan			Contemporary Art Museum Kumamoto, Kumamoto, Japan
Light Reign	2003	Henry Art Gallery, Seattle, Washington, United States			Henry Art Gallery, Seattle, Washington, United States
Cat Cairn	2000	Kielder Water, Northumberland, England, United Kingdom			Kielder Water, Northumberland, England, United Kingdom
Above Horizon	2004	Sheats Goldstein Residence, Beverly Hills, California, United States			James Goldstein
Blue Planet Sky	2004	21st Century Museum of Contemporary Art, Kanazawa, Japan			21st Century Museum of Contemporary Art, Kanazawa, Japan
Open Sky	2004	Chichu Art Museum, Naoshima, Japan			Chichu Art Museum, Naoshima, Japan
Three Gems	2005	de Young Museum, San Francisco, California, United States			de Young Museum, San Francisco, California, United States
Hard Scrabble Sky (UIC Skyspace)	2005	Gateway Plaza, University of Illinois at Chicago, Chicago, Illinois, United States			University of Illinois at Chicago, Chicago, Illinois, United States
Piz Utèr	2005	Hotel Castell, Zuoz, Switzerland			Hotel Castell
Third Breath	2005, 2009	Unna, Germany			Centre for International Light Art (CILA), Unna, Germany
Second Wind	2005	Fundación NMAC Vejer de la Frontera (Cádiz), Spain			Fundación NMAC Vejer de la Frontera (Cádiz), Spain
Sky Pesher	2005	Walker Art Center, Minneapolis, Minnesota, United States			Walker Art Center, Minneapolis, Minnesota, United States (Gift of the Frederick R. Weisman Art Foundation)
Blue Pearl	2005	Museum der Moderne Salzburg, Salzburg, Austria		9.20 x 7.20 x 8.36 meters	Museum der Moderne Salzburg, Salzburg Foundation, Austria
Tending, (Blue)	2005-2012	Nasher Sculpture Center, Dallas, Texas, United States			Nasher Sculpture Center, Dallas, Texas, United States
Stone Sky	2005	Stonescape vineyard, Calistoga, California, United States		Architect: Jim Jennings	Norman and Norah Stone
Deer Shelter	2006	Yorkshire Sculpture Park, England, United Kingdom			Yorkshire Sculpture Park, England, United Kingdom (commissioned by The Art Fund)
Revised Outlook	2004-2006	Santa Monica Canyon, Los Angeles, California, United States			Dallas Price-Van Breda
Roden Crater	2006	Flagstaff, Arizona, United States			James Turrell
Dividing the Light	2007	Pomona College, Claremont, California, United States		Metal canopy with square aperture, lighting program, reflecting/continuous pool; includes courtyard space with granite bench seating and landscaping	Pomona College, Claremont, California, United States
Within without	2010	Australian Garden, National Gallery of Australia, Canberra, Australia		Lighting installation, concrete and basalt stupa, water, earth, landscaping 800 x 2800 x 2800 cm	National Gallery of Australia, Canberra, Australia
Outside Insight	2011	Ytterjärna, Sweden		When built it was the most northern Skyspace ever made. Seating for 22	Ytterjärna, Stockholm, Sweden
Joseph's Coat	2011	John and Mable Ringling Museum of Art, Sarasota, Florida, United States		3,000 square feet with an aperture of 24 square feet, seating for 56	John and Mable Ringling Museum of Art, Sarasota, Florida, United States
The Way of Color	2011	Crystal Bridges Museum of American Art, Bentonville, Arkansas United States			Crystal Bridges Museum of American Art, Bentonville, Arkansas, United States
Twilight Epiphany	2012	Rice University, Houston, Texas, United States		The tower is shaped like a pyramid. Visitors gaze up at a 72-by-72 foot white roof with a 14-by-14 foot opening looking out into the sky. LEDs sync up with the sunrise and sunset.	
Air Apparent	2012	Arizona State University, Tempe, AZ			Arizona State University, Tempe, AZ
Twilight Resplendence	2012	Museum SAN, Oakvalley 2gil 260, Jijeong-myeon, Wonju-city, Gangwon-do, South Korea			Museum SAN, Wonju-city, Gangwon-do, South Korea
Gathered Sky	2012	Temple Hotel, Beijing, China			Temple Hotel, Beijing, China
La Brea Sky	2013	Kayne Griffin Corcoran, Los Angeles, California, United States			Maggie Kayne, James Corcoran, William Griffin
Greeting the Light	2013	Chestnut Hill Friends Meeting, Philadelphia, Pennsylvania, United States		Architect: James Bradberry	Chestnut Hill Friends Meeting, Philadelphia, Pennsylvania, United States
Tewlwolow Kernow	2013	Tremenheere Sculpture Gardens, Penzance, Cornwall, United Kingdom			
The Color Inside	2013	The University of Texas at Austin, Austin, Texas, United States		Architect: Overland Partners	The University of Texas at Austin, Austin, Texas
Raising Kayne	2013	Kayne Residence, Santa Monica, California, United States			Richard and Suzanne Kayne
The Color Beneath	2013	Ekebergparken Sculpture Park, Oslo, Norway			Ekebergparken Sculpture Park, Oslo, Norway
Amarna	2015	Museum of Old and New Art, Hobart, Tasmania, Australia			Museum of Old and New Art, Hobart, Tasmania, Australia
Encounter	2015	Jardín Botánico Culiacán, Culiacán, Mexico			Jardín Botánico Culiacán, Culiacán, Mexico
Seldom Seen	2015	Houghton Hall, Norfolk, UK			
Elliptic, Ecliptic	2016	Venet Foundation, Le Muy, France			Venet Foundation, Le Muy, France
Skyspace	2016	Museum Voorlinden, Wassenaar, the Netherlands			Museum Voorlinden, Wassenaar, the Netherlands
Ta Khut Skyspace	2021	Posada Ayana, José Ignacio, Uruguay			Posada Ayana
C.A.V.U.	2021	Mass MoCA, North Adams, Massachusetts, United States			Mass MoCA
Green Mountain Falls Skyspace	2022	Green Mountain Falls, Colorado, United States			Green Box Arts
Espíritu de Luz	2022	Parque Central, Tec de Monterrey, Monterrey, Nuevo León, Monterrey			Monterrey, Nuevo León, México
Leading	2023	Friends Seminary, New York, United States			Friends Seminary
Come to Good	2024	Keith House, Fort Worth, United States		Architect: Michael Bennett	Entrada of Texas, Meta Alice Keith Bratten Foundation
