= Norah Sharpe Stone =

Canadian-born American businessman and vintner (1938–2019)

- Born: August 6, 1938; Alberta, Canada
- Died: September 6, 2019; California

Norah Sharpe Stone (August 6, 1938 – September 6, 2019) was a Canadian-born American philanthropist, vintner, and collector of modern and contemporary art, interests she shared with husband Norman C. Stone.

== Biography ==
Norah Sharpe was born in Golden Valley, Alberta, Canada. She earned a nursing degree from the University of Alberta and later a law degree from the San Francisco Law School. She also pursued art studies at the Sorbonne in Paris and the Academy of Art in San Francisco. She has held positions in nursing as well as corporate law.

In 1986, she married philanthropist and fellow art connoisseur Norman C. Stone. Since their marriage, the Stones have collected major works of contemporary and modern art. Their private collection, divided between residences in San Francisco and the Napa Valley, feature artists such as Jan de Cock, Robert Gober, Jeff Koons, Cady Noland, Richard Prince, Richard Serra, Keith Tyson, Christopher Wool, Andy Warhol, Marcel Duchamp, Hans Bellmer and Tony Conrad.

The Stones' Napa Valley wine estate, Stonescape, features a 5,750-square-foot (534 m^{2}) art cave designed by Bade Stageberg Cox as well as a pool and pavilion designed by James Turrell. The landscape was designed by Tom Leader

Stonescape is located in the Diamond Mountain District AVA of the Napa Valley appellation. Throughout the 1990s, the property produced critically acclaimed merlot wines under the Azalea Springs label. The Stones replanted the vineyard in 2000 with premium cabernet sauvignon vines producing wine under the AZS label with the intention of bottling future vintages under the Stonescape Wines label.

Stone was a trustee of the San Francisco Museum of Modern Art and a member of the National Committee of the Whitney Museum in New York, and the Tate International Council in London. She was also a trustee of the W. Clement & Jessie V. Stone Foundation. Stone was honored as one of San Francisco's best dressed citizens in 2007 by San Francisco Magazine. The Stones have been listed in Art News Top 200 Collectors.

Norah Sharpe Stone died in 2019, aged 81, in California.
