= Jan De Cock (disambiguation) =

Jan De Cock may refer to:

- Jan De Cock (b. 1976), Belgian artist
- Jan Claudius de Cock (1667–1736), Flemish artist
- Jan Wellens de Cock (c. 1480–1527), Flemish painter and draftsman
