= Chestnut Hill Friends Meeting =

Meeting of Religious Society of Friends (Quakers)

Coordinates: 40.0685°N 75.1960°W

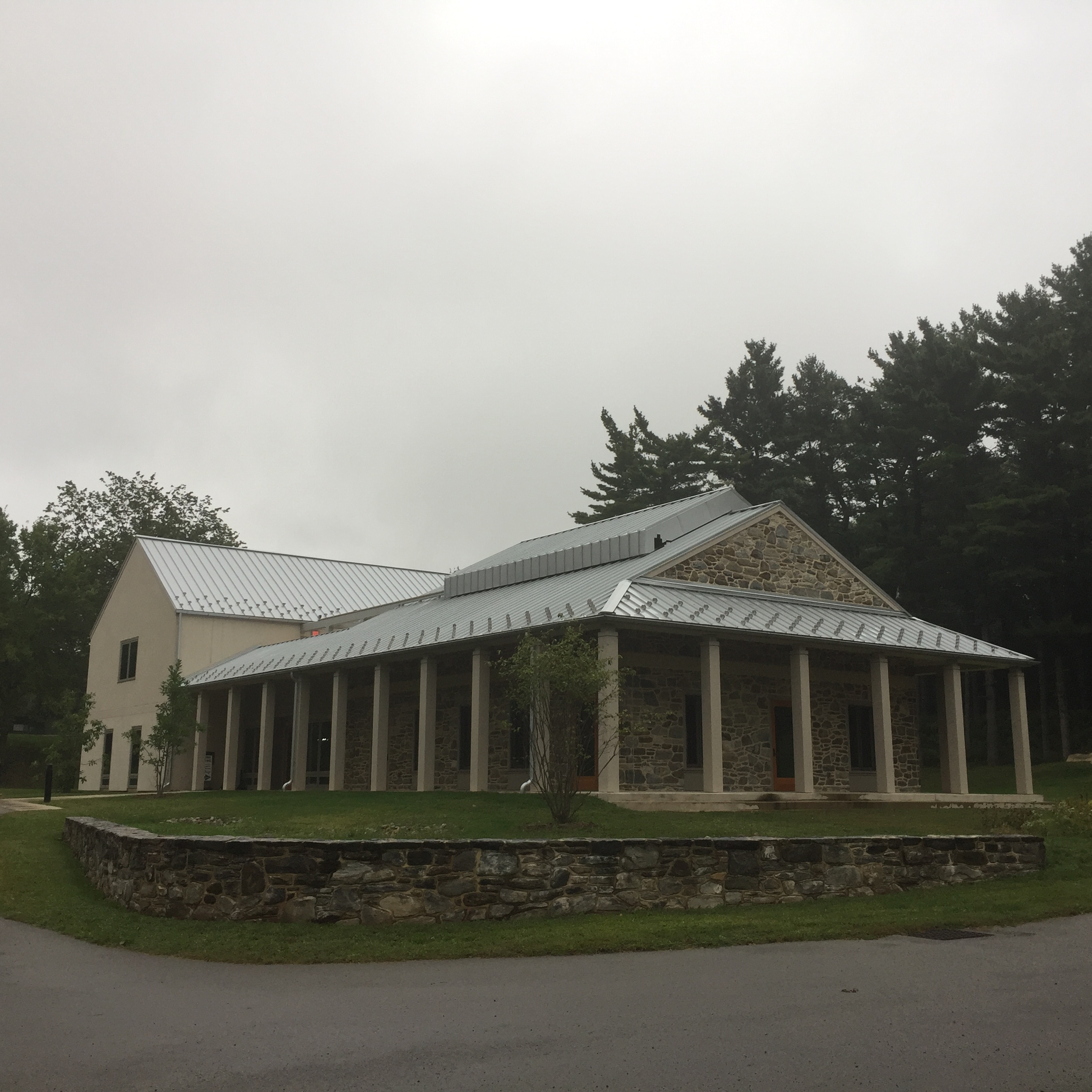
Chestnut Hill Friends Meeting, 20 East Mermaid Lane, Philadelphia

The Chestnut Hill Friends Meeting is a monthly meeting (congregation) of the Religious Society of Friends (Quakers). First meeting in 1924, they were the first "United" monthly meeting, reconciling Philadelphia Quakers after the Hicksite/Orthodox schism of 1827. The original Meeting House, built in 1931, was located at 100 E. Mermaid Lane in the Chestnut Hill neighborhood of Philadelphia, Pennsylvania. It was replaced in 2012-2013 by the current meeting house, located at 20 E. Mermaid Lane, which incorporates a Skyspace designed by Quaker light artist James Turrell, the second such installation to be incorporated into a working religious space. The new Quaker meeting house is the first to be built in Philadelphia in eighty years.

The Meeting House is an active center for worship and the activities of the Monthly Meeting. Since 1955, it has been a part of the Philadelphia Quarterly Meeting. The meeting has participated in the Yearly Meetings of Friends. The multi-purpose building offers a variety of programs that are open to both Quakers and non-Quakers. The meeting works with the Northwest Interfaith Hospitality Network to provide short term housing for families in transition. It also engages with other community organizations such as the Friends Council and Mt. Airy Learning Tree.

== Formation of the meeting ==
In 1924, the Abington (Orthodox) and Philadelphia Quarterly (Hicksite) meetings in Philadelphia established the Chestnut Hill United Monthly Meeting of the Society of Friends, a united meeting for worship. Their first meeting was at the home of Robert and Elizabeth Yarnall on November 9, 1924. They were the first monthly meeting to reconcile members of the Hicksite and Orthodox Yearly Meetings, a schism that had split the Friends in 1827. The group was officially recognized by the Philadelphia Yearly Meeting in 1933, becoming the Chestnut Hill Monthly meeting.

== Original meeting house ==
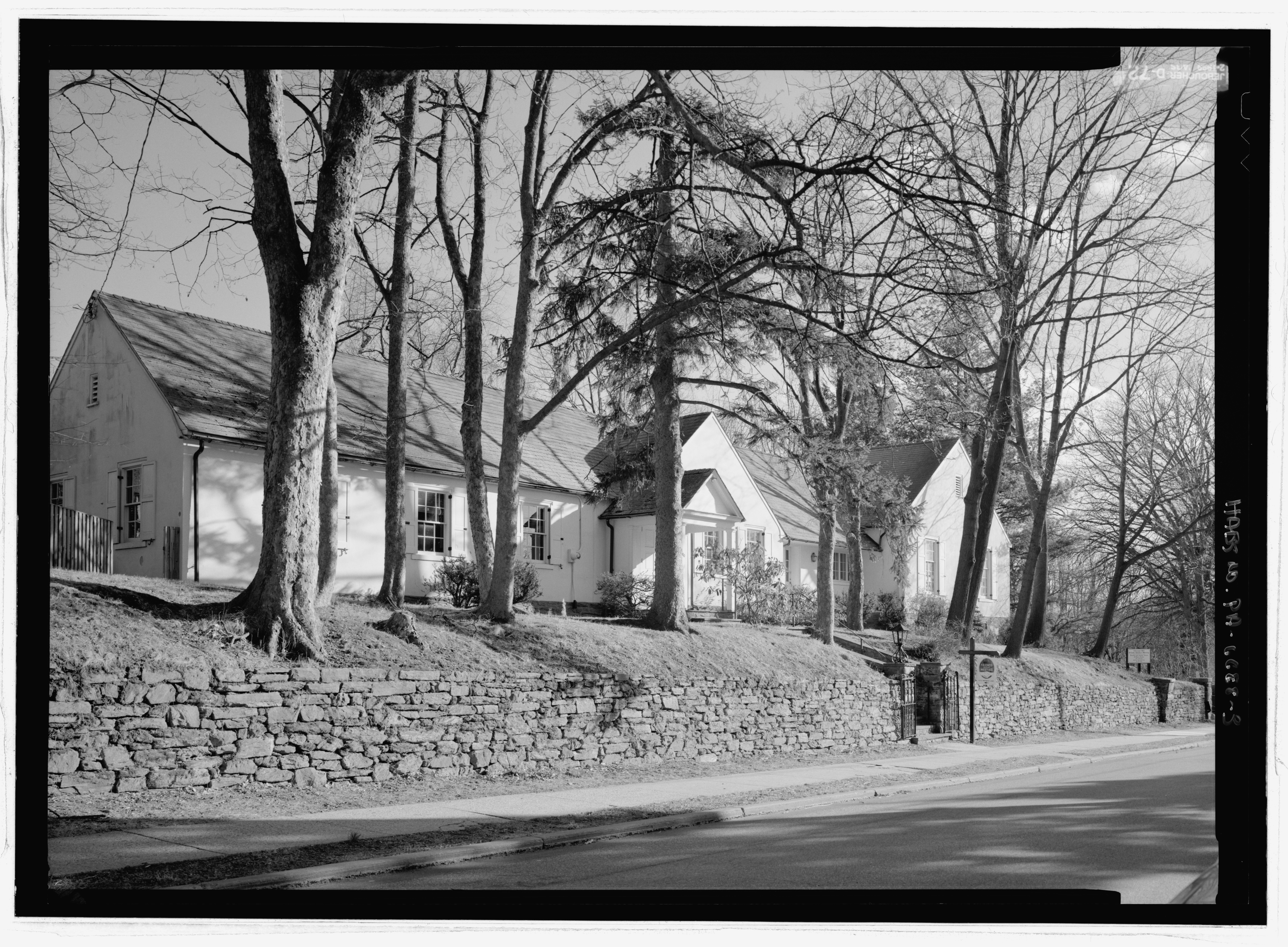
Exterior, 100 East Mermaid Lane, Philadelphia

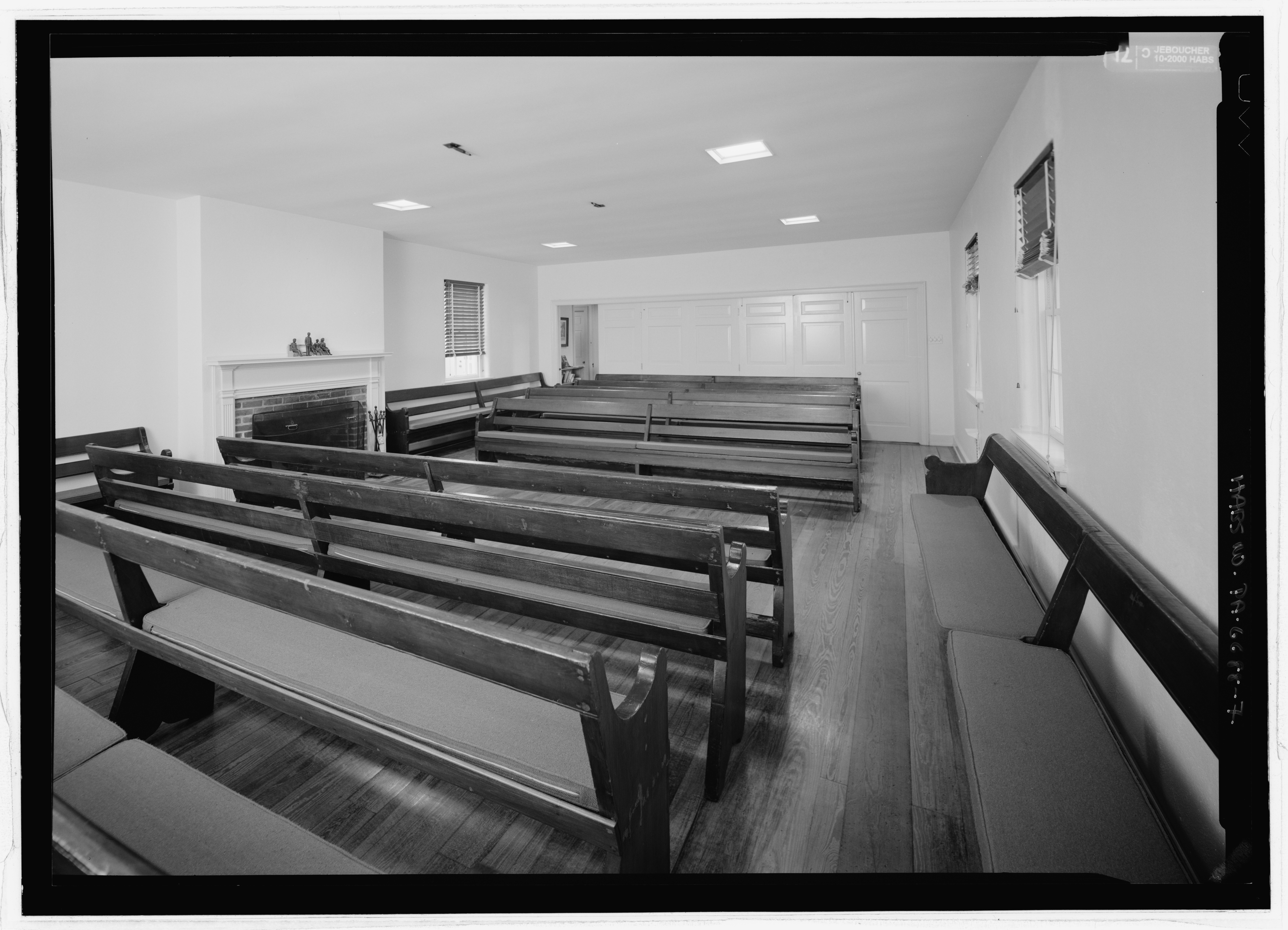
Interior, 100 East Mermaid Lane, Philadelphia

The original Chestnut Hill Friends Meeting House at 100 East Mermaid Lane was built in 1931. The building was one story high, in a sprawling ranch-style building with a low-pitched gable roof. The facade was made of stucco and rubble stone over load-bearing concrete block. The building contained a meeting room and adjacent space, which could be joined by opening folding doors between them; a central gabled vestibule, a kitchen, restrooms and classrooms. Windows let in the light.

The building at 100 Mermaid Lane was innovative for a Quaker meeting in a number of ways. The "ranch-style" design was reminiscent of residential architecture, connecting traditional meetinghouses with more modern domestic forms. A fireplace hearth was substituted for the "facing benches" traditionally used by ministers and elders. The partitions that had traditionally separated men and women during meeting for business were removed. In this way, the design of the meeting house emphasized the equality and the lack of hierarchy of the meeting.

The building of the new meeting house led to an unanticipated increase in membership, almost doubling the meeting in size. The meeting house's limited space and poor accessibility for older members were factors in the eventual decision to build a new meeting house. The decision to build a new space was taken after many years of considered deliberation. The original building was eventually sold to United Cerebral Palsy.

== Modern meeting house ==
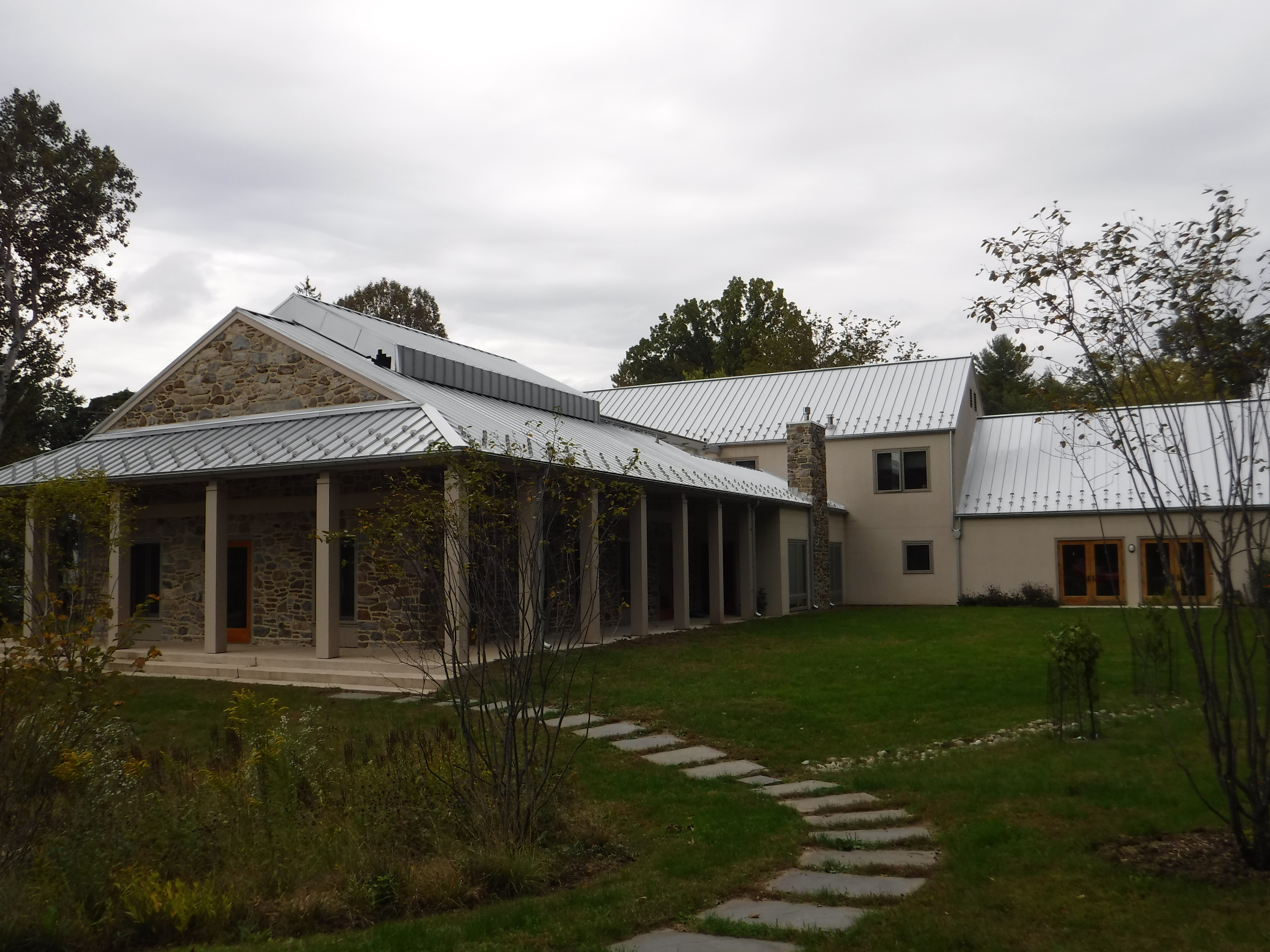
Exterior, 20 Mermaid Lane, with stormwater garden

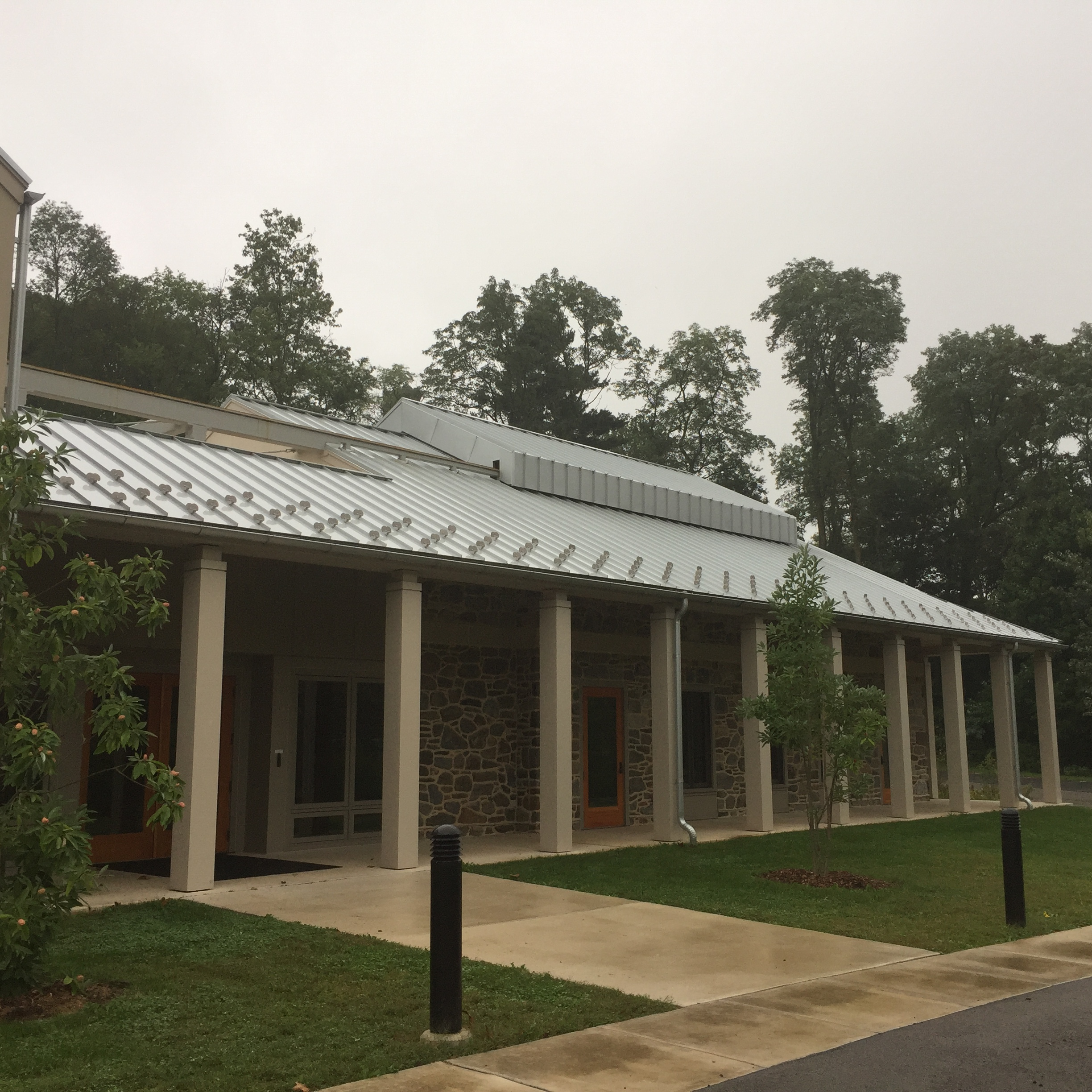
Retractable roof for Skyspace

The modern Chestnut Hill Friends Meeting House at 20 East Mermaid Lane was designed by architect James Bradberry of Bryn Mawr, working with natural light artist James Turrell and Chestnut Hill Meeting members. It is intended as a modern embodiment of Friends' testimonies of simplicity and equality. The meeting house incorporates a permanent light installation donated by Turrell. Turrell's 76th Skyspace, it is entitled Greet the Light. It is the second Turrell skyspace to be located within a Quaker meetinghouse, and was inspired by its predecessor, Live Oak Friends Meeting House in Houston, Texas.

Approximately 2/3 of the cost of the building was raised by members. The meeting also received a National Endowment for the Arts grant to help fund the project. Ground was broken for the new building, the first new Quaker meeting house to be built in 80 years, in May 2012. The new meeting house was constructed between August 2012 and August 2013. In spite of construction delays due to an incident of arson that caused substantial damages, the new building opened for worship in September, 2013.

The two-story L-shaped building is sited on a partially wooded 1.8 acre-site not far from the location of the original meetinghouse. Emphasis was placed on green architecture, sustainability and environmentally friendly construction practices. Built in a former quarry, the surroundings are naturally landscaped and include green stormwater management features. The building was expected to meet LEED platinum standards of construction.

The main entrance to the building has floor-to-ceiling windows and a slate floor. Sliding pocket doors connect the foyer and the meeting room . A 600 square foot "gathering room" contains a fireplace and a library. A 1200 square foot social room adjoins a kitchen and opens to an outdoor terrace. The second floor includes classrooms and a mini-kitchen and a handicapped-usable bathroom and shower, essential for the work of the Interfaith Hospitality Network. The building is wrapped on several sides by a wide porch, reminiscent of traditional meetinghouses.

The skyspace is installed in the 36-foot-high vaulted ceiling of the 1600-square-foot meeting room. The room has plain white walls with 24-foot-high windows, their sills deep enough to sit it, that fill the room with natural light. The floor is made of reclaimed long leaf yellow pine. The skyspace was first opened to the public for selected sunrise and sunset viewings of Turrell's Skyspace Greet the Light on October 20, 2013. A viewing lasts approximately 50 minutes, at dawn or dusk. When the retractable roof is opened, light from the sky enters the meeting space through the skylight, combining with a sequence of pre-programmed LED lighting around the vaulted ceiling. The roof is not opened for viewing in bad weather.

Upon entrance, visitors are welcome to lie down in the meeting room and await the sunrise or sunset. Part of the roof quietly slides away, revealing a rectangular shape that opens directly to the sky. In the ceiling, Turrell created what he calls a "sensing space," a space that opens to and draws light from another source. What happens next challenges how we think we know what we think we see. For about 50 minutes, we can revel in the sensing space's one-of-a-kind experience. LED lights in colors found in the sky — rich pinks, violets, and blue-greens — line the lower ledge of the ceiling. Color seeps into the space, making light present. At times, the rectangular opening appears to be floating; at others, it seems solid. As subtleties transition into dramatic changes, our perception of the world becomes an illusion, literally.

== See also ==
- Chestnut Hill Historic District (Philadelphia, Pennsylvania)
- Friends meeting houses in Pennsylvania
