= Stuck Red/Stuck Blue =

Pair of art installations by James Turrell

Stuck Red / Stuck Blue
- Artist: James Turrell
- Year: 1970
- Type: Installation art
- Dimensions: 460 cm × 430 cm (180 in × 168 in)
- Location: Museum of Contemporary Art, San Diego

Stuck Red and Stuck Blue are a pair of art installations produced by the American artist James Turrell. The pieces were created in 1970, and have formed part of several exhibitions of contemporary art in museums around the world, most recently in the Museum of Contemporary Art in San Diego, United States. On each occasion, the pair have been displayed together as a combined installation.

== Description ==
The pieces are displayed in a specially constructed octagonal chamber. The floor, ceiling and every wall are painted in a deep burgundy and are carefully and evenly lit. Stuck Red and Stuck Blue are placed on two of the longer walls, which are separated by a shorter "corner" wall. The pieces each consist of a recess cut into one of the walls, each equidistant from the adjoining corner. Inside of each recess is a coloured fluorescent light (red in Stuck Red, blue in Stuck Blue). The lights are not visible directly, but they illuminate exactly the space cut from the wall, with no spillage. The walls of the recesses are painted white, but by reflecting the light from the fluorescent lamps appear to be different colours. The overall effect of the two pieces is to engender an optical illusion in which the three-dimensional space of the installation appears to collapse into two dimensions - the apertures seem to alternate between their actual "void" form and being on a single plane with the surrounding walls, ceiling and floor.

== Background ==
Much of Turrell's work is dedicated to the exploration of the aesthetic properties and "thingness" of light, drawing inspiration from sources as wide-ranging as the works of the perceptual phenomenologist Merleau Ponty (with whom Turrell became familiar through his background in psychology) to those of artists such as Claude Monet and Mark Rothko. Stuck Red and Stuck Blue were assembled as early as 1970, while Turrell was working in a studio in Mendota, California, but he did not publicly exhibit the work until 1989. The debut of the two pieces took place at the Ace Gallery in Los Angeles, California. In 1990, the works were reinstalled at the Museum of Contemporary Art in San Diego, purchased with funds from the Elizabeth W. Russell Foundation. In 2008, Stuck Red and Stuck Blue formed part of a temporary exhibition at the Museum of Contemporary Art, Sydney. Each installation of the pieces required significant preparatory work by Turrell, who used a combination of diagrams and scale models, as well as extensive on-site experimentation, to determine the correct proportions and layout for the chambers.
