= Acton (Turrell) =

Installation by James Turrell

- Artist: James Turrell
- Year: 1976
- Type: Installation art
- Dimensions: 6.4 m × 10 m × 7.3 m (21 ft × 34 ft × 24 ft)
- Location: Indianapolis Museum of Art, Indianapolis

Acton is an artwork created by American artist James Turrell in 1976, located in the Indianapolis Museum of Art. It consists of two rooms with an aperture between them, carefully illuminated such that the rectangular hole appears to be a flat, gray canvas until closer inspection reveals its three-dimensional nature.

== Description ==
As a part of Turrell's Space Division Construction series, Acton consists of two distinct rooms of roughly equal sizes divided by a wall with a rectangular opening. The viewer enters the "sensing space," which is dimly illuminated by tungsten lights aimed at the walls. These low-light conditions lead them to first perceive the opening and the "viewing space" beyond it as a solid grey plane. However, time and closer examination reveal the true nature of the spaces. Security guards often facilitate this shift in perception by encouraging patrons to "touch" the "painting," going so far as to instruct them to speed walk toward it, making the moment of realization even more startling.

=== Acquisition ===
Acton was acquired by the IMA in 1989 with the help of the Contemporary Art Society, the National Endowment of the Arts, and friends of Sylvia Zazas. It is located in the Nagler Family Gallery and has the acquisition number 1989.111.

== See also ==
- Skyspace
- Roden Crater
