= UIC Skyspace =

Skyspace by James Turrell

- Hard Scrabble Sky
- Artist: James Turrell
- Year: 2005
- Location: United States; 41°52′01″N 87°38′50″W

The UIC Skyspace, officially titled Hard Scrabble Sky, is an art installation by James Turrell on the South Campus of the University of Illinois at Chicago, located there since 2005. Hard Scrabble Sky is a Skyspace, part of a series of site-specific installations by Turrell that present a constrained view of the sky.

The sculpture and a fountain are located in the middle of Earl Neal Plaza, named for the lawyer who was instrumental in coordinating the development of the South Campus.

== History ==
The UIC Skyspace was commissioned in August 2003 as a component of Gateway Plaza.

== Location ==
Hard Scrabble Sky is fully accessible to the public, and open 24/7. The installation uses waterfalls to create background noise, with the intent of isolating the viewer from the noise of the surrounding city. Numerous other Skyspace installations are located in quiet locations, and the UIC installation's noisy cityscape presents a distinct experience from other Turrell Skyspaces.

Earl Neal Plaza, the site of the installation, is the site of the former Maxwell Street Market, home of the Chicago specialty, the Maxwell Street Polish. The broader development of the campus has faced criticism for continuing gentrification in the area.

== Technology ==
Hard Scrabble Sky uses LED lighting on the interior and exterior of the installation. Effects are programmed into a controller and run automatically, controlled using DMX from a Philips IPlayer 3 controller. The interior LED lighting serves to complement the view of the sky, presenting a contrasting experience between sky and ceiling during daytime and nighttime.
