= Norman C. Stone =

American businessman and vintner (1939–2021)

Norman C. Stone (April 28, 1939 – April 2, 2021) was an American psychotherapist, philanthropist, vintner and a collector of modern and contemporary art.

== Biography ==
Stone, son of Chicago businessman and self-help book author W. Clement Stone, was born in Evanston, Illinois. He earned a B.A. in economics from Stanford University and a doctorate from the Wright Institute Graduate School of Social-clinical Psychology in Berkeley, California.

Stone served as a staff psychologist at the mental health center in 1980 for the Bayview Hunters Point Foundation for Community Improvement in San Francisco, counseling patients for schizophrenia, crack addiction and depression.

Stone studied painting at the San Francisco Art Institute before attending the Wright Institute. Under the tutelage of Thea Westreich Art Advisory Services in New York, Stone began collecting contemporary art in the mid 1980s. He and his wife, Norah Sharpe Stone, acquired works by contemporary artists such as Jan de Cock, Robert Gober, Jeff Koons, Cady Noland, Richard Prince, Richard Serra, Keith Tyson and Christopher Wool. Their collection also features works from such Andy Warhol, Marcel Duchamp, Hans Bellmer and Tony Conrad.

The collection was divided among the Stones' primary residence in San Francisco and their Napa Valley wine estate, Stonescape. The latter property has a 5,750-square-foot (534 m^{2}) art cave designed by Brooklyn architectural firm Bade Stageberg Cox, as well as a pool and pavilion conceptualized by James Turrell, an artist noted for his Skyspaces, and executed by Jim Jennings. The landscape was designed by Tom Leader.

Stone was president of the W. Clement and Jessie V. Stone Foundation as well as a trustee of the San Francisco Museum of Modern Art. Both he and wife Norah were members of the National Committee of the Whitney Museum in New York, and the Tate International Council in London. He was a co-founder of the Nueva School in Hillsborough, California.

Stonescape is located in the Diamond Mountain District AVA of the Napa Valley appellation. Since the 1990s, the property has produced Merlot wines under the Azalea Springs label. The Stones replanted their vineyards in 2002 with premium cabernet sauvignon vines producing wine under the AZS label. Stone was a member of the Napa Valley Vintners, a non-profit trade association.

Stone died on April 2, 2021, at the age of 81 in San Francisco, California.
