= Museum SAN =

Museum in Wonju, South Korea

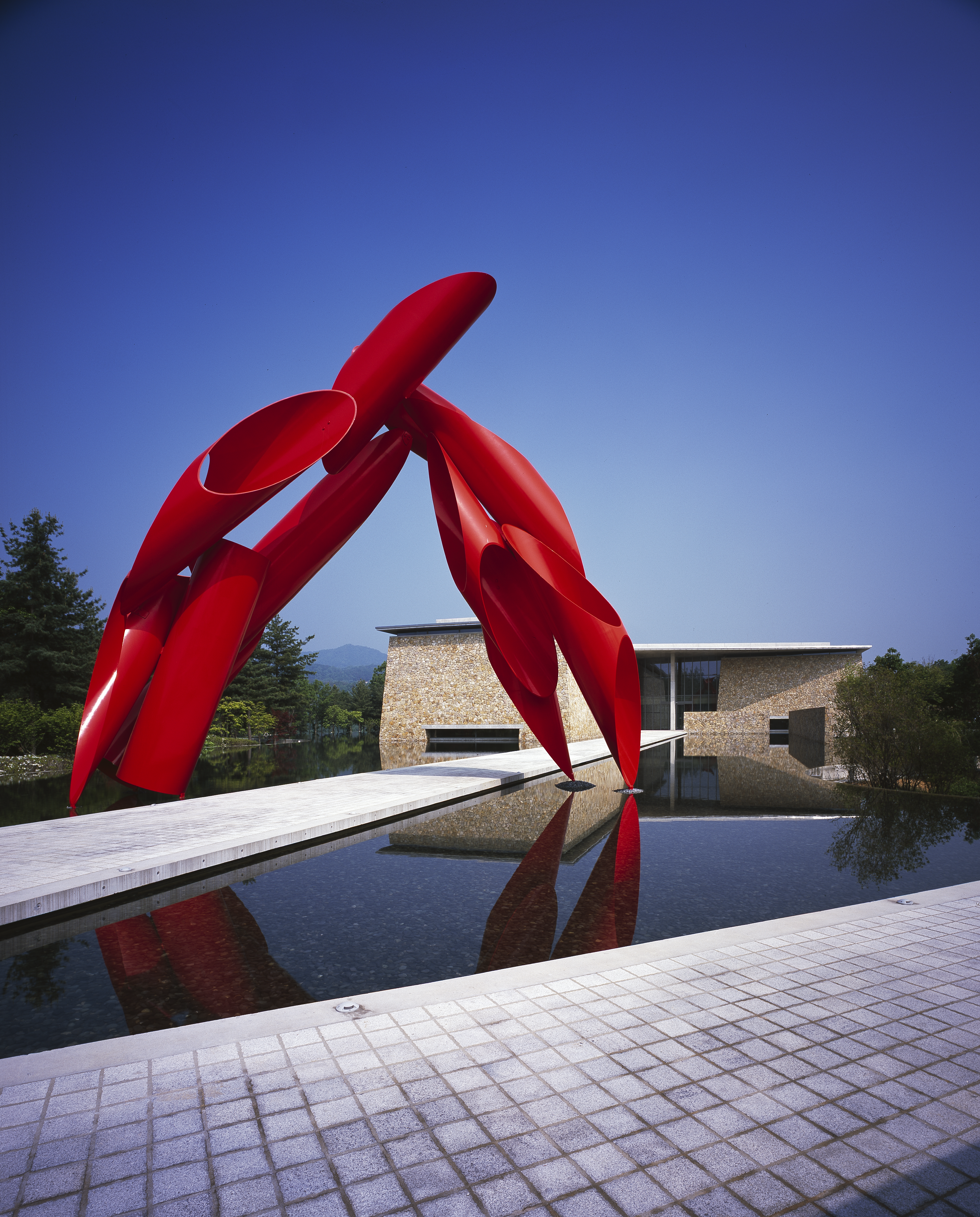
- Museum SAN Main building
- Established: May 16, 2013
- Location: Oakvalley, Wonju, South Korea
- Visitors: 1 million per year
- Director: Oh Kwang-su
- Architect: Tadao Ando
- Website: Official website

The Museum SAN (Space Art Nature) is located in Oak Valley, in the mountains of Wonju, South Korea. It was designed by Japanese architect Tadao Ando and is under the administration of the Hansol Cultural Foundation. Ando said he designed the museum to express gratitude for the architecture and its beautiful natural environment. The museum, which is composed of a welcome center, flower garden, water garden, meditation hall, stone garden, main building, and James Turrell exhibition hall, focuses on the interaction of art and nature. Other facilities include a print shop, cafe, and museum shop.

The museum receives about 1 million visitors per year, and was shortlisted for the Leading Culture Destinations of 2015 award, Asia section, by leadingculturedestinations.com.

== Museum architecture ==
Oakvalley is a purpose-built resort that is owned by the Hansol Group. The museum stretches 700 m (2,300 ft) along a mountain top. According to Ando, the architect who designed the $70 million main building and grounds, "I wanted to create a garden museum in the sky, a dreamlike museum like no other." The main building consists of four oblong boxes joined by circular and triangular courtyards, and clad in paju, a local, honey-colored stone. This building houses the Paper Gallery and the Cheongjo Galleries.

In addition to the main building, the museum includes a flower garden, water garden, stone garden, James Turrell exhibition hall, and outdoor sculptures including Alexander Liberman's sculpture, Archway.

The museum opened in 2013 as the Hansol Museum and was renamed Museum SAN in 2014.

== Exhibits ==
=== Paper gallery ===
The Hansol Paper Museum opened in 1997. It was named for Hansol Paper, the founding company of the Hansol Cultural Foundation. This collection, which includes hair ornaments and maps made of paper that feels like animal skin, now forms one of the permanent exhibits at Museum SAN.

=== James Turrell ===
James Turrell is known as an artist who "paints with light". Five exhibits by Turrell are permanently on exhibit in a separate building. The exhibits are: Wedgework, which uses projected light to give the illusion of walls; Ganzfeld, which uses light to eliminate depth perception; and three exhibits, Skyspace, Horizon Room, and Space Division, that involve viewing the sky or a light-filled room through an aperture in the ceiling or wall.

=== Temporary exhibits ===
The art collection comes from the private collection of Lee In-Hee, an advisor to the Hansol Group and the daughter of Lee Byung-chul (the founding chairman of Samsung). This collection focuses on Korean art after 1945 and forms the basis for many of the museum's biennial exhibitions.

Recent exhibitions:

- Being in Nature focuses on the interaction of humans and nature. The exhibition includes 45 pieces by 19 artists including Seund Ja Rhee, a pioneer of Korean abstract art.
- Korean Modern Art 1: Western Painting features works, from the museum's collection, from artists such as Nam June Paik.
