= Live Oak Friends Meeting House =

Quaker meeting house in Houston, Texas

Coordinates: 29°48′34″N 95°25′24″W

External videos
- “Arts InSight: James Turrell“, Houston Public Media

Live Oak Friends Meeting House is a Quaker meeting house located at 1318 West 26th Street in the Heights area of Houston, Texas, United States. The meeting house, which was completed in December 2000, was designed and built to house the Live Oak Friends Meeting, which was formed in 1954. The building features a permanent installation by the artist James Turrell, known as the Skyspace or One Accord. It has been described as an architectural "idealization of Quaker testimonies like peace and equality."

== Live Oak Friends Meeting ==
Live Oak Friends Meeting (LOFM) is a monthly meeting (congregation) of the Religious Society of Friends (Quakers) in Houston, Texas. The Meeting is a Liberal Quaker meeting and worships in the traditional unprogrammed style. The Meeting is a member of Bayou Quarterly Meeting and South Central Yearly Meeting and is associated with Friends General Conference. The meeting has approximately 75-100 attendees.

The Meeting was founded in 1954, when a group met at the home of Walter and Myra Whitson. Members of the meeting met for many years in temporary spaces, including a Jewish community center, a Presbyterian manse, the Chocolate Bayou Theater, and a dance studio. They acquired two acres on which to build, but lacked resources to do so.

== The Meeting House ==
Hiram Butler, a Houston gallery owner, connected the Live Oak meeting with Arizona-based artist James Turrell. Turrell, a Quaker himself, was fascinated by light. He saw the Live Oak meeting house as an opportunity to combine his art and his religious faith by creating a working space for religious worship that would embody the Quaker belief in inner divinity, often spoken of as the "light within". In turn, partnering with the artist offered new possibilities for raising funds for creation of the meeting house, by soliciting funds from the Houston arts community.

Members of the Live Oak Friends Meeting were deeply concerned about whether the creation of an expensive building, with outside funding, could be reconciled with the Quaker Testimony of Simplicity. Members of the community resolved their concerns in part by working out issues through the consensus-based processes of Quaker meeting with James Turrell and architect Leslie K. Elkin.

Once we understood it as a leading, that enabled us to understand it in the way we think ... We came to share Jim's leading, as a way of giving something to the entire Houston community that was important.

Members of the meeting worked with architect Leslie K. Elkin and artist James Turrell to design the building. The meeting raised half a million dollars, about 1/3 of the total cost of the project. The rest of it was funded through gifts from outside individuals, corporations and foundations, to a nonprofit established for the project. Groundbreaking for the building occurred in October 1998. The building was completed in 2000 and opened to the public in 2001.

The design of the meeting house draws upon early Quaker meeting houses such as the Gunpowder Friends Meeting House in Sparks, Maryland and the 1684 Third Haven Meeting House in Easton, Maryland. The long house form of the building was suggested by the Gunpowder Meeting House. Third Haven's white oak benches were the basis for the benches of the Live Oak Meeting House. Turrell was also inspired by his childhood memories of meeting for worship.

The three-room meeting house has a broad metal roof, supported by large timbers. Wide overhanging eaves create a nine-bay facade, with doorways in the even-numbered sections. The flooring is made of sinker pine which was salvaged from the Trinity River and cut specifically for the meeting house. Its long submersion has given the wood a greenish tint. Inside the main room, benches are arranged in a square. Above the center of the square is Turrel's Skyspace installation.

== The Skyspace ==
The Skyspace consists of a 12-foot-square opening in the roof, with a retractable cover that can be opened to the sky. When the roof is not open, a system of hidden neon tubes fills the Skyspace with blue light. This permanent installation by artist James Turrell was originally known simply as the Skyspace. More recently it has been referred to as One Accord, to differentiate it from other installations of skyspaces by Turrell.

The eyes cling to this skyward window, to the clouds and occasional bird in flight that pass across it, but especially to the light ... At sundown, light shifts softly from porcelain transparency to silken cobalt blue and velvet black. Eyes turn inward, and a hush descends. The Skyspace transforms the spare, white meeting room into a luminous chamber, a metaphor for the body and soul.

— Patricia C. Johnson, 2001

Between 2008 and 2010, the Skyspace could not be used. It had to be redesigned and renovated to address damage to the retractable roofing system. The rails supporting the hatch were originally made of wood covered in metal. Due to the semitropical climate the wood had begun to rot. The new design replaced the metal-covered wood with a square metal pipe, braced at the sides. The new design was expected to be both water- and hurricane-proof. The space was again closed and repaired between 2013 and 2015, because of flooding from a broken pipe. As of February 27, 2015, openings resumed on Friday evenings and on the first Sunday evening of the month.

Emphasis on and utilization of natural light is seen as a guiding principle in the architecture of more modern Quaker meeting houses. The Live Oak Meeting House has been described as the most spectacular example of this style.
