= James Turrell =

American artist known for work with light

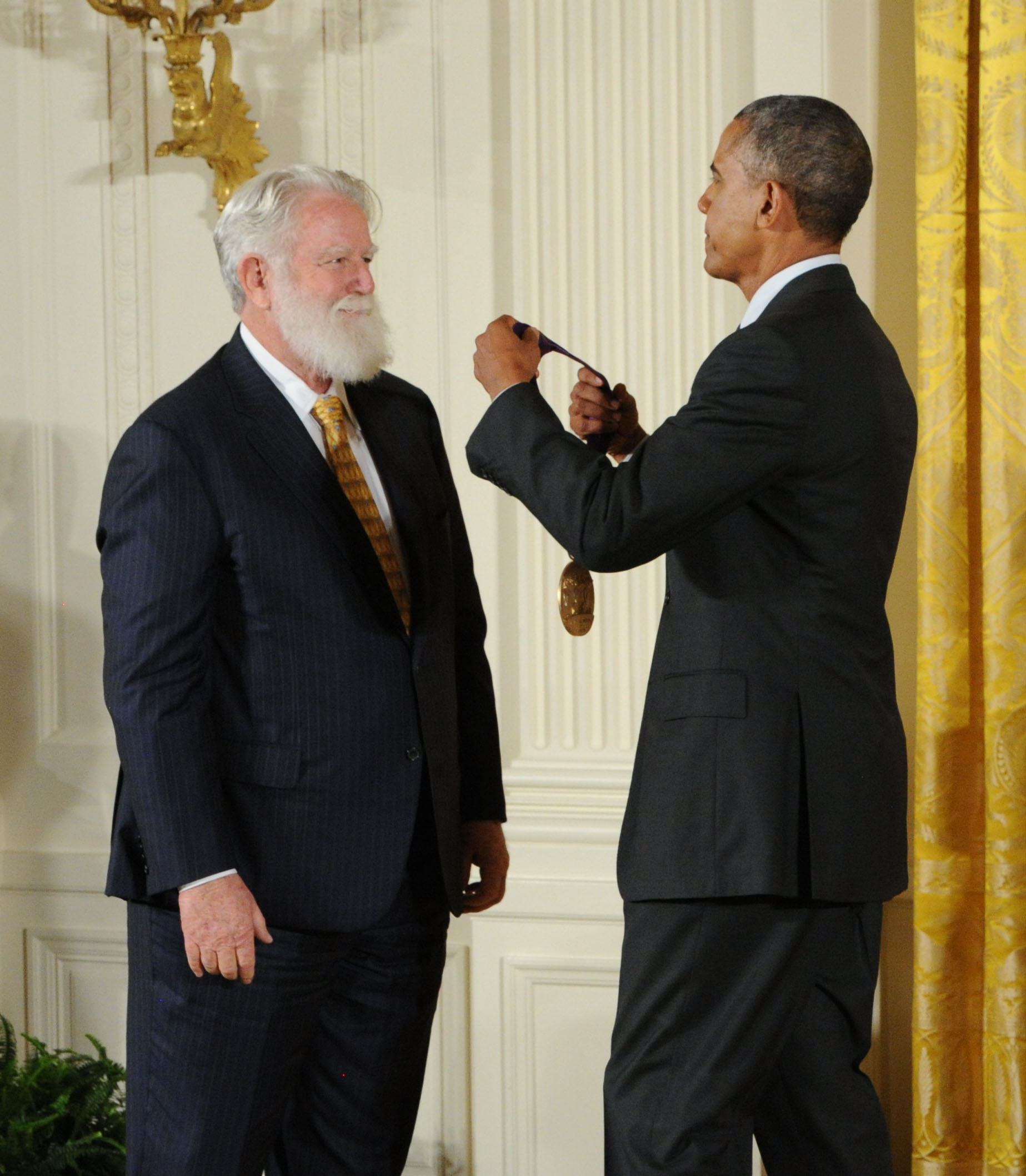
- President Barack Obama presents the National Medal of Arts to Turrell in 2014
- Born: May 6, 1943 (age 83); Los Angeles, California, US
- Education: Pomona College; University of California, Irvine; Claremont Graduate University
- Occupation: Artist
- Known for: Installation art
- Notable work: Roden Crater, Acton
- Movement: Light and Space
- Website: jamesturrell.com

James Turrell (born May 6, 1943) is an American artist known for his work within the Light and Space movement. He is considered the "master of light" often creating art installations that mix natural light with artificial color through openings in ceilings thereby transforming internal spaces by ever shifting and changing color.

Much of Turrell's career has been devoted to a still-unfinished work, Roden Crater, a natural cinder cone crater located outside Flagstaff, Arizona, that he is turning into a massive naked-eye observatory; and for his series of skyspaces, enclosed spaces that frame the sky.

Turrell was born in Los Angeles, California, and grew up in a Quaker family. He obtained his pilot's license at the age of 16 and later registered as a conscientious objector during the Vietnam War, flying Buddhist monks out of Chinese-controlled Tibet. Turrell's academic background includes a BA degree from Pomona College in perceptual psychology and further studies in mathematics, geology, and astronomy. He began experimenting with light projections during his time in the graduate Studio Art program at the University of California, Irvine, which laid the foundation for his later works.

Turrell's innovative use of light and space has earned him numerous accolades, including being named a MacArthur Fellow in 1984. His works, which explore perception and the nature of light, have been exhibited in major museums and public art spaces worldwide.

== Background ==
James Turrell was born in Los Angeles, California. His father, Archibald Milton Turrell, was an aeronautical engineer and educator. His mother, Margaret Hodges Turrell, trained as a medical doctor and later worked in the Peace Corps. His parents were Quakers.

One of his major inspirations to pursue art with light was an exhibit by Thomas Wilfred that he saw when he was 15. Turrell obtained a pilot's license when he was 16 years old. Later, registered as a conscientious objector during the Vietnam War, he flew Buddhist monks out of Chinese-controlled Tibet. Some writers have suggested it was a CIA mission; Turrell called it "a humanitarian mission" — and that he found "some beautiful places to fly". For years he restored antique airplanes to support his "art habit".

He received a BA degree from Pomona College in perceptual psychology in 1965 (including the study of the Ganzfeld effect) and also studied mathematics, geology, and astronomy. The following year, Turrell enrolled in the graduate Studio Art program at the University of California, Irvine, where he began making work using light projections. His studies at Irvine were interrupted in 1966, when he was arrested for coaching young men to avoid the Vietnam draft. He spent about a year in jail. In 1973, he received a Master of Arts degree from Claremont Graduate University.

== Artistic career ==
External videos
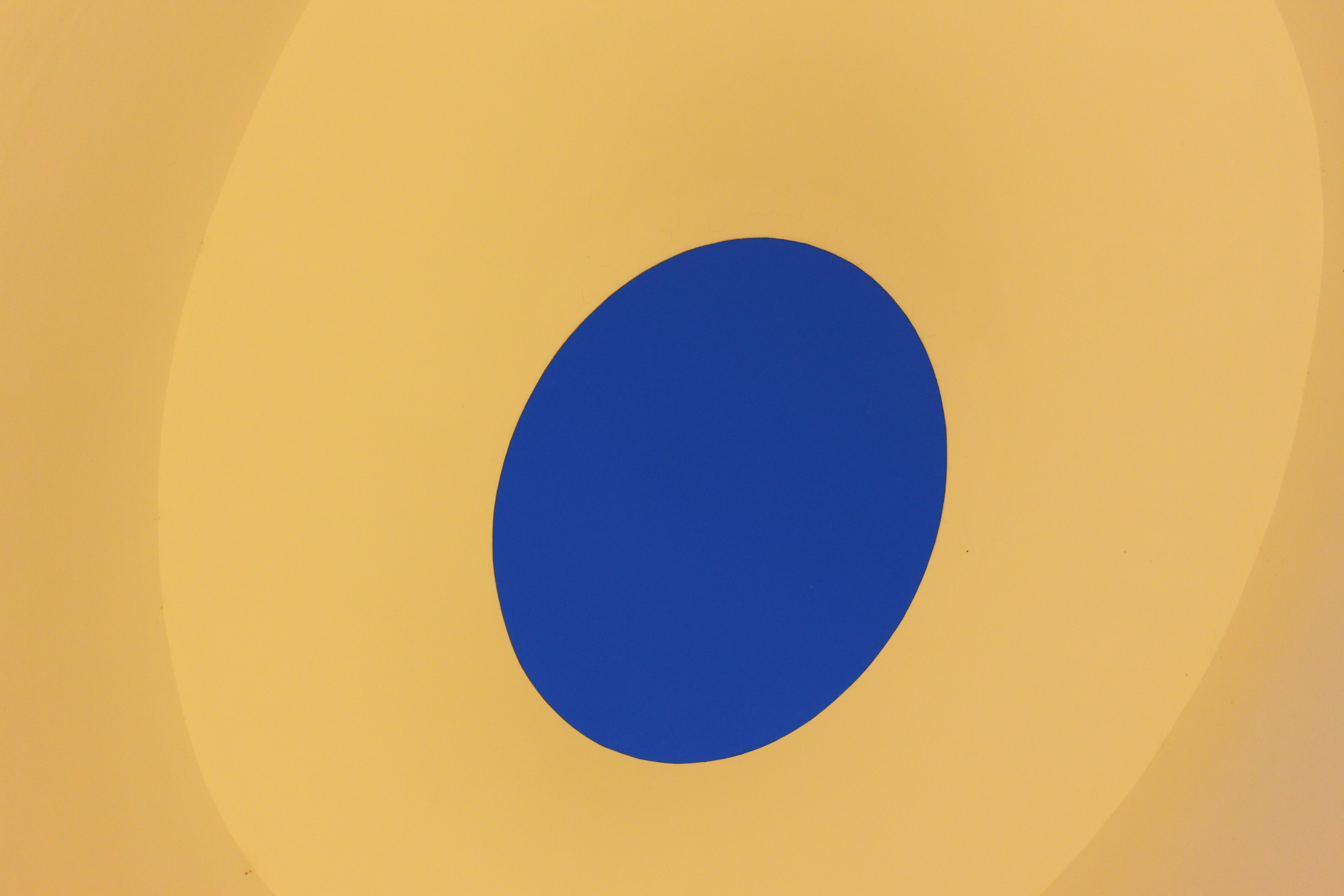
- James Turrell, Skyscape, The Way of Color, 4:40, Smarthistory

=== Early work ===
In 1966, Turrell began experimenting with light in his Santa Monica studio, the Mendota Hotel, at a time when the so-called Light and Space group of artists in Los Angeles, including Robert Irwin, Mary Corse and Doug Wheeler, was coming into prominence. By covering the windows and only allowing prescribed amounts of light from the street outside to come through the openings, Turrell created his first light projections. In Shallow Space Constructions (1968) he used screened partitions, allowing a radiant effusion of concealed light to create an artificially flattened effect within the given space. That same year, he participated in the Los Angeles County Museum's Art and Technology Program, investigating perceptual phenomena with the artist Robert Irwin and psychologist Edward Wortz.

In 1969, he made sky drawings with Sam Francis, using colored skywriting smoke and cloud seeding materials. A pivotal environment Turrell developed from 1969 to 1974, The Mendota Stoppages, used several rooms in the former Mendota Hotel in Santa Monica which were sealed off, with the window apertures controlled by the artist to allow natural and artificial light to enter the darkened spaces in specific ways.

=== Roden Crater Project ===
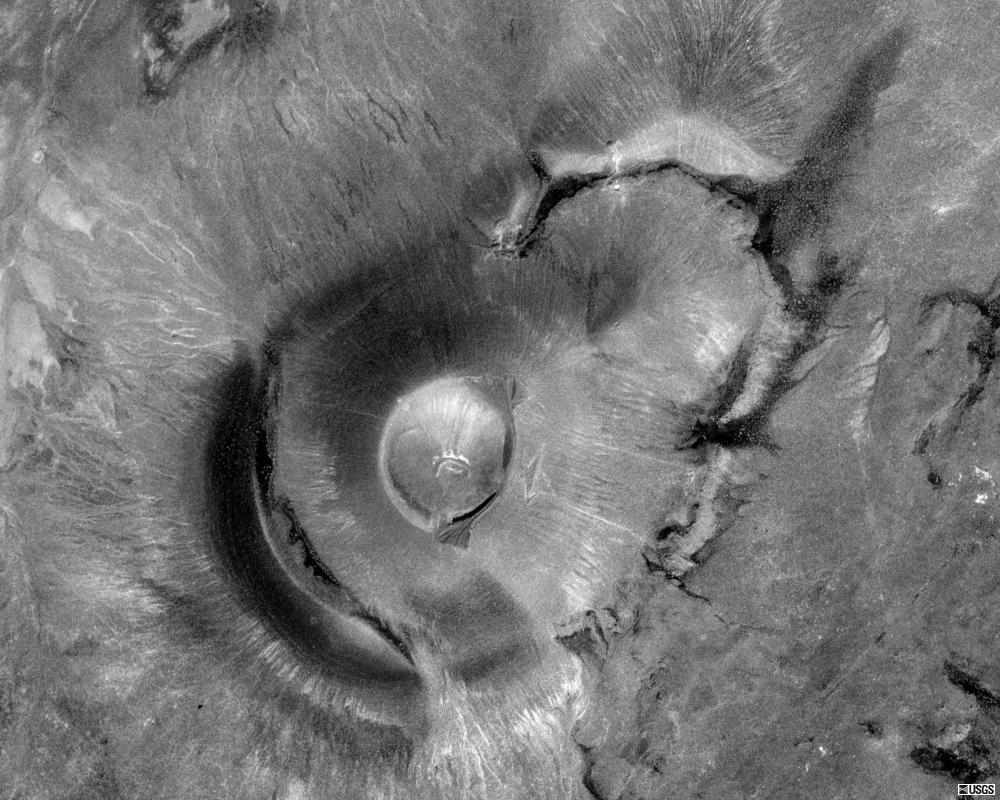
Satellite view of Roden Crater, the site of an epic artwork in progress by James Turrell outside Flagstaff, Arizona

In 1979, Turrell acquired an extinct cinder cone volcano located outside Flagstaff, Arizona. Since then he has spent decades moving tons of dirt and building tunnels and apertures to turn this crater into a massive naked-eye observatory for experiencing celestial phenomena.

A completion date for the Crater has been announced and pushed back several times since the 1990s. The last time Turrell or his team went on record talking about a completion date, the goal was 2011; but according to a 2013 article in the Los Angeles Times, "nobody volunteers a date any more". Roden Crater has been long shrouded in secrecy and access limited to friends of the artist, although fans have sneaked in without the artist's permission. In Febuary of 2015 a program was established by which devoted fans could gain sanctioned access in May of that year by completing the "Turrell Tour", which involves seeing a Turrell in 23 countries worldwide, Roden Crater was open to a select group of 80 people at a cost of $6,500 per person.

Although he works in the American desert, Turrell does not consider himself an earthworks artist like Robert Smithson or Michael Heizer. "You could say I'm a mound builder," he said. "I make things that take you up into the sky. But it's not about the landforms. I'm working to bring celestial objects like the sun and moon into the spaces that we inhabit." He added: "I apprehend light—I make events that shape or contain light."

In 2019, Turrell partnered with the Arizona State University Herberger Institute for Design and the Arts to collaborate on the project, changing the name to the "ASU-Roden Crater Project." This collaboration hopes to employ the interdisciplinary resources of ASU to better use and maintain the project. ASU has already begun including the facilities into course curriculum, including one class titled "Indigenous Stories and Sky Science" taught by Professor Dalla Costa.

=== Skyspaces ===
In the 1970s, Turrell began his series of "skyspaces" enclosed spaces open to the sky through an aperture in the roof. A Skyspace is an enclosed room large enough for roughly 15 people. Inside, the viewers sit on benches along the edge to view the sky through an opening in the roof. As a lifelong Quaker, Turrell designed the Live Oak Meeting House for the Society of Friends, with an opening or skyhole in the roof, wherein the notion of light takes on a decidedly religious connotation. (See PBS documentary). His work Meeting (1986) at P.S. 1, which consists of a square room with a rectangular opening cut directly into the ceiling, is a recreation of such a meeting house. In 2013, Turrell created another Quaker skyspace, Greet the Light, at the newly rebuilt Chestnut Hill Friends Meeting in Philadelphia.

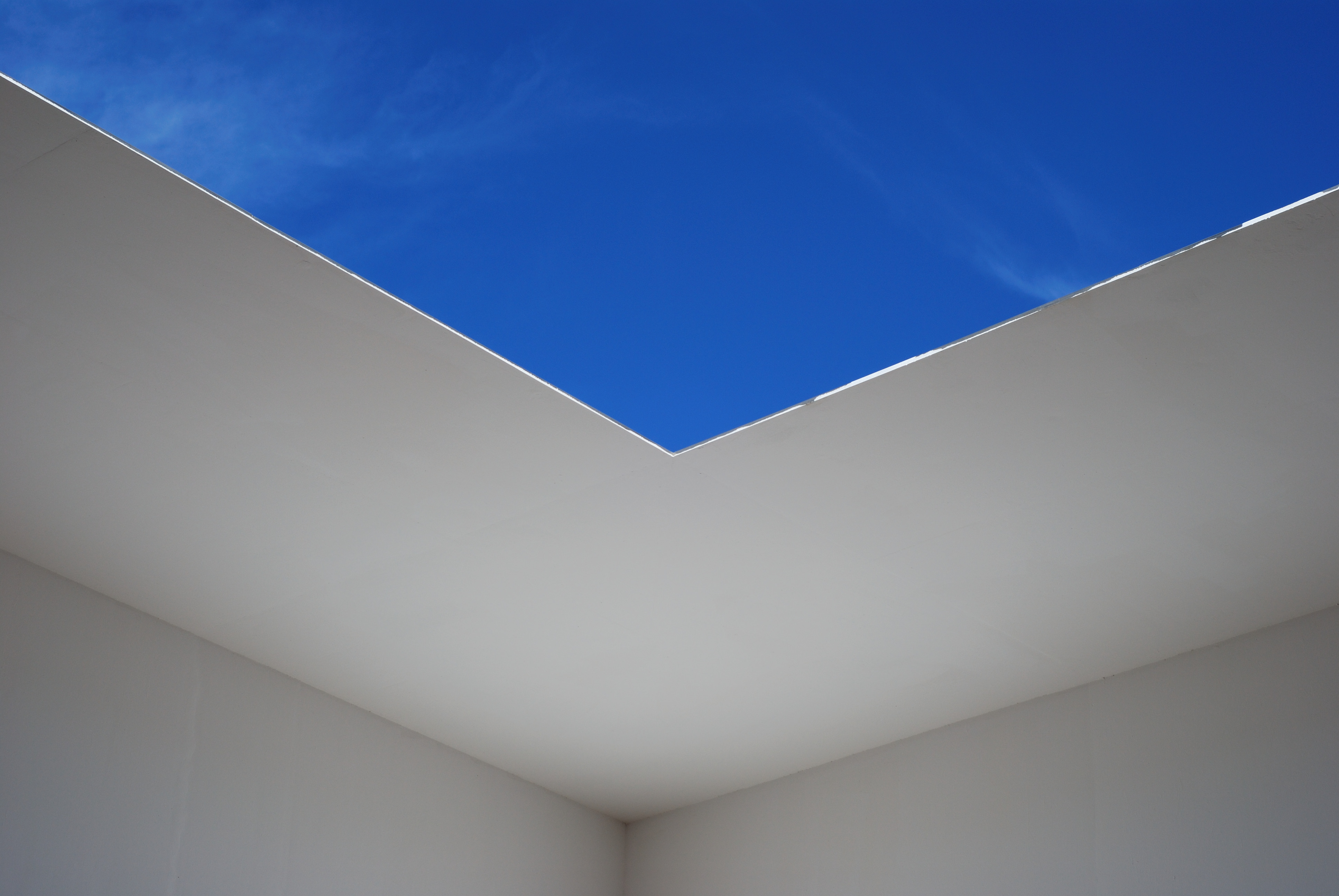
Space That Sees, at Israel Museum, Jerusalem

In a New York Times article on L.A. collectors building skyspaces in their backyards, Jori Finkel describes a skyspace as a "celestial viewing room designed to create the rather magical illusion that the sky is within reach – stretched like a canvas across an opening in the ceiling".

In 1992, Turrell's Irish Sky Garden opened at the Liss Ard Estate, Skibbereen, Co Cork, Ireland. The giant earth and stoneworks has a crater at its center. A visitor enters through a doorway in the perimeter of the rim, walks through a passage and climbs stairs to enter, then lies on the central plinth and looks upwards to experience the sky framed by the rim of the crater. "The most important thing is that inside turns into outside and the other way around, in the sense that relationships between the Irish landscape and sky changes" (James Turrell).

In 2001, Turrell made a "sky room" and pool for Nora and Norman Stone in Napa Valley, in which visitors swim through a tunnel into the outdoor pool, where an aperture in the roof displays a perfect slice of sky.

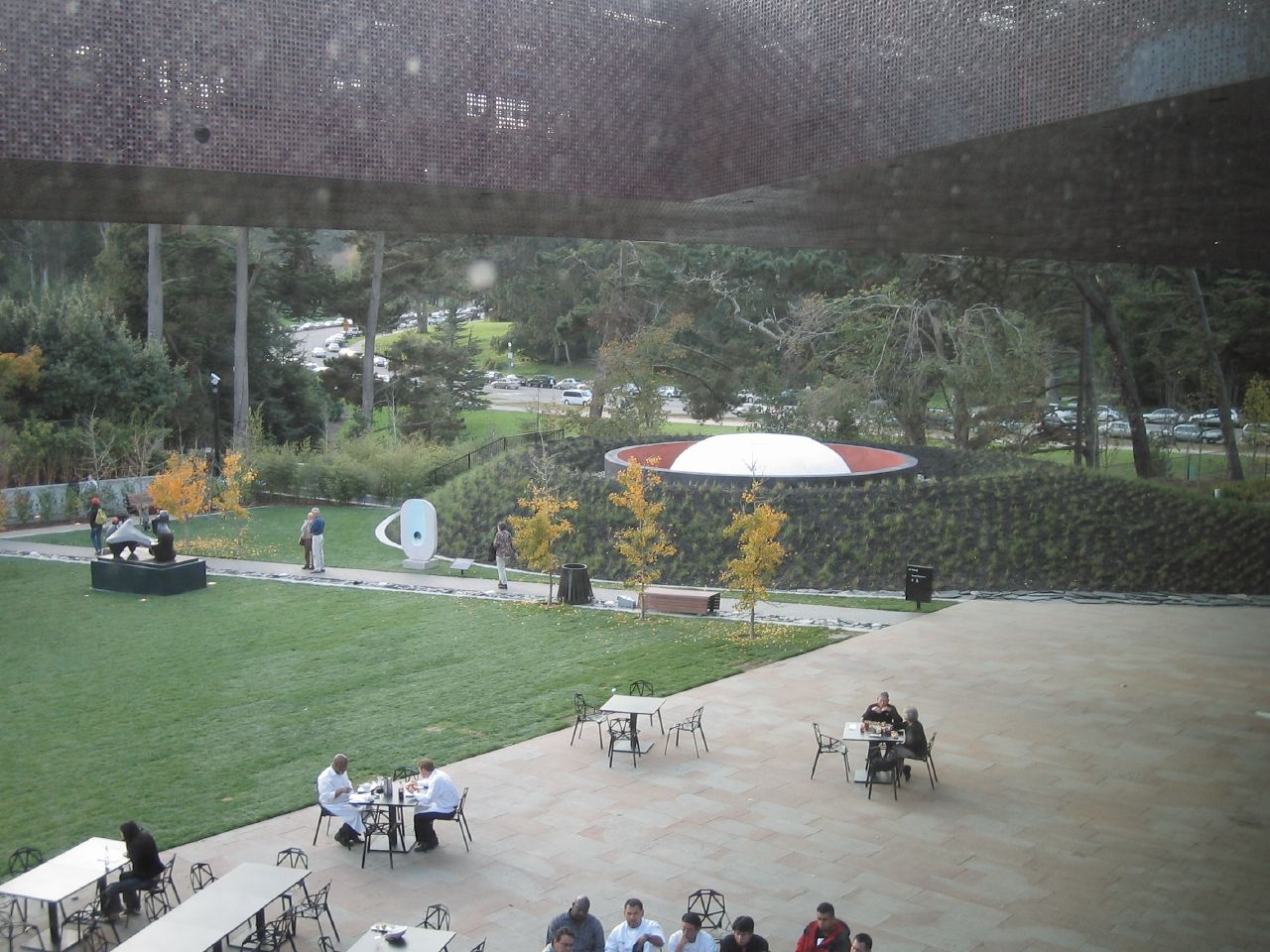
2005 view of Three Gems

Since 2009, Turrell's Third Breath, 2005 is part of the permanent exhibition of the Centre for International Light Art (CILA) in Unna, Germany. It is a camera obscura, consisting of two rooms: In the lower, cubic room (Camera Obscura Space), the visitor sees an image of the sky which is being reflected through a lens on the ground. In the upper, cylindrical room (Sky Space), the sky can be seen directly through a hole in the ceiling.

Three Gems (2005) at the de Young Museum is Turrell's first Skyspace to adopt the stupa form. It is built into a dune and has an oculus to view the sky. The Three Gems is largely hidden from view and is accessed by a tunnel.

At Houghton Hall in Norfolk, the Marquess of Cholmondeley commissioned a folly to the east of the great house. Turrell's Skyspace presents itself from the exterior as an oak-clad building raised on stilts. From the inside of the structure, the viewer's point of view is focused upwards and inevitably lured into contemplating the sky as framed by the open roof.

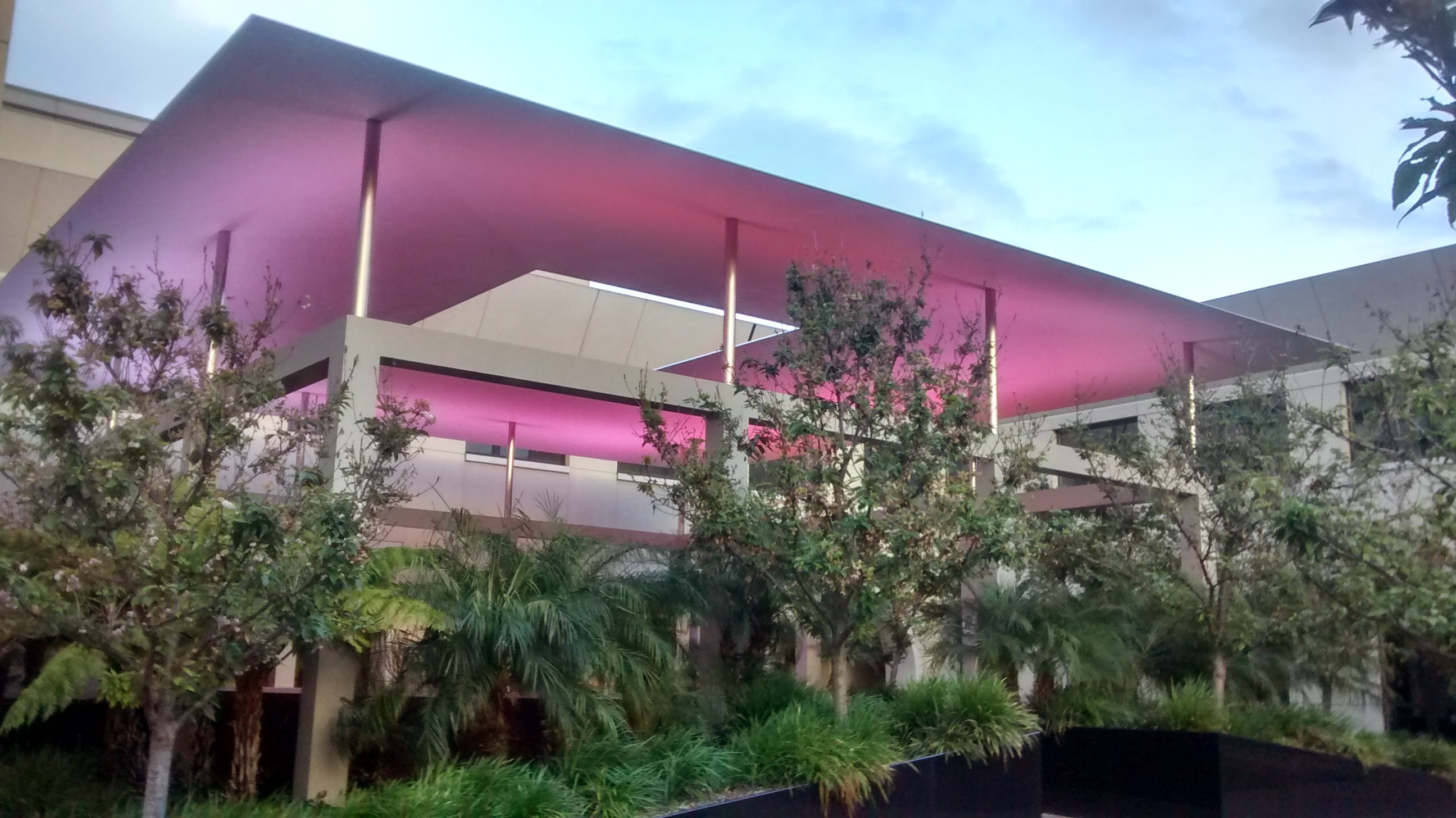
Dividing the Light by James Turrell

Turrell's Dividing the Light (2007) incorporates both water and landscaping. This Skyspace is an open-air pavilion, with a canopy structure and aperture, lighting program, pool, and landscaping, situated in the Draper Courtyard at Pomona College. The 16-square-foot (1.5 m^{2}) canopy aperture mirrors the continuous pool below, which is surrounded by granite seating and landscaping. At its opening, David Pagel of the Los Angeles Times called it "one of the best works of public art in recent memory".

His 2007 Deer Shelter Skyspace at Yorkshire Sculpture Park in England, commissioned by The Art Fund, was awarded that year's 2007 Marsh Award for Excellence in Public Sculpture.

Other Skyspaces include the Kielder Skyspace (2000) on Cat Cairn in Kielder, Northumberland, England; Knight Rise (2001) at the Scottsdale Museum of Contemporary Art; Light Reign (2003) at the Henry Art Gallery in Seattle, WA; SkySpace at Earl Neal Plaza (2004) at the University of Illinois at Chicago;Sky Pesher (2005) at the Walker Art Center; Second Wind (2005) in Vejer de la Frontera, Spain; the Sky-Space (2006) in Salzburg, Austria; The other Horizon (2004) in Vienna, Austria (MAK-Branch Geymüllerschlössel); Within Without (2010) at the National Gallery of Australia in Canberra; La Brea Sky (2013) at Kayne Griffin Corcoran; Hardanger Skyspace (2016) in Oystese (Norway), located by the Hardangerfjord and a part of The Art Centre Kabuso; the Skyspace Lech (2018) in Oberlech in Vorarlberg (Austria); the Ta Khut Skyspace (2021) in José Ignacio, Uruguay; the Green Mountain Falls Skyspace (2022) in Green Mountain Falls, Colorado, USA; and at Friends Seminary (2023).

The Walker Art Center restored its 2005 Sky Pesher work in 2023 and worked with Turrell to convert the original cold cathode tubes, which were becoming impossible to replace, with LED lights. The change allowed for a wider range of colors compared to the original that was "shades of tinted white" at sunrise and sunset; now the lighting program is multicolored. The seats in this installation are heated.

=== Other works ===
Completed in 2008, Turrell devised an indoor pool in Connecticut for collectors Lisa and Richard Baker, which creates the sensation of swimming in a mirrored light box.

In 2009 the first museum worldwide dedicated to Turrell's work was opened in the province of Salta, Argentina. It is part of the Hess Collection at Colome. The light art pieces represent five decades of the artist's career, like a time tunnel, and are exhibited in a progression of nine rooms within a 1,700-square-metre (18,000 sq ft) space. The experience concludes with a remarkable example of Turrell's exhibited sky spaces, created within the inner courtyard of the museum, which reaches maximum intensity in the views of the Andean sky at dawn and sunset.

Turrell is also known for his light tunnels and light projections that create shapes that seem to have mass and weight, though they are created with only light. Three such works by Turrell (Danaë, Catso Red, and Pleiades) are permanent installations at the Mattress Factory in Pittsburgh, Pennsylvania. Turrell's 1968 projection of a suspended luminous pink pyramid, Raethro Pink, was acquired by the Welsh National Museum of Art. His work Acton is a very popular exhibit at the Indianapolis Museum of Art. It consists of a room that appears to have a blank canvas on display, but the "canvas" is actually a rectangular hole in the wall, illuminated to look otherwise. Security guards are known to come up to unsuspecting visitors and say "Touch it! Touch it!"

Turrell's works defy the "accelerated" habits of many people, especially when looking at art. He feels that viewers spend so little time with the art that this makes it hard to appreciate.

I feel my work is made for one being, one individual. You could say that's me, but that's not really true. It's for an idealized viewer. Sometimes I'm kind of cranky coming to see something. I saw the Mona Lisa when it was in L.A., saw it for 13 seconds and had to move on. But, you know, there's this slow-food movement right now. Maybe we could also have a slow-art movement, and take an hour.

Art critic John McDonald writes that Turrell's works are "dull to describe but magical to experience".

== Exhibitions ==
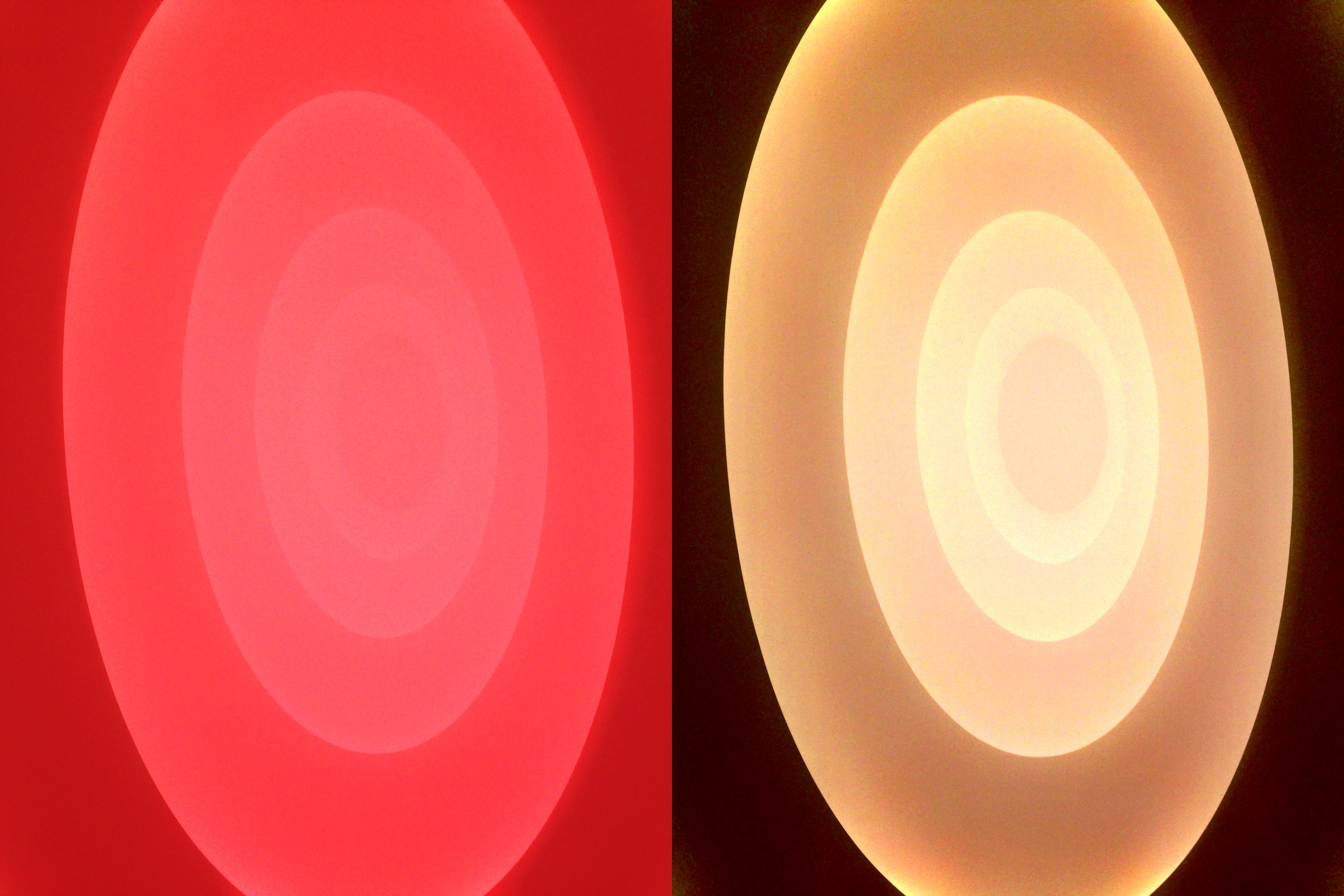
Two separate shots side-by-side looking up toward the ceiling in the middle of the Guggenheim Museum in New York during James Turrell's light exhibition Aten Reign

Turrell was given his first solo show at the Pasadena Art Museum in 1967. Solo exhibitions have since included the Stedelijk Museum (1976); Whitney Museum of American Art, New York (1980); Israel Museum (1982); Museum of Contemporary Art, Los Angeles (1984); MAK, Vienna (1998–1999); Mattress Factory, Pittsburgh (2002–2003).

The Wolfsburg Project at the Kunstmuseum Wolfsburg, Turrell's largest exhibition in Germany to date, opened in October 2009 and continued through October 2010. Amongst the works featured in the Wolfsburg Project was a "Ganzfeld" work, which is a light installation that covers 700 square meters in area and 12 meters in height. Also in 2009, the opening of the artwork Third Breath, 2005 at the Centre for International Light Art in Unna, Germany, was accompanied by the four-month exhibition James Turrell – Geometry of Light.

James Turrell: A Retrospective, a major exhibition spanning the artist's 50-year career, was exhibited from May 26, 2013, to April 6, 2014, at the Los Angeles County Museum of Art and travelled to the National Gallery of Australia.

From June to September 2013 the Solomon R. Guggenheim Museum presented James Turrell, the artist's first exhibition in a New York museum since 1980. The exhibition focused on the artist's explorations of perception, light, color and space. A new project, Aten Reign (2013), recast the Guggenheim rotunda as an enormous volume filled with shifting artificial and natural light.

In early 2017, his work was featured in the solo exhibition, Immersive Light, at the West Bund Long Museum Shanghai. Into the Light, an installation of nine Turrell works, is on view at MASS MoCA from 2017 until at least 2025.

James Turrell's work has been exhibited at public art spaces as well as commercial galleries around the world. He is represented by Häusler Contemporary in Zűrich, Kayne Griffin Corcoran, Los Angeles, Pace Gallery, New York, Hiram Butler Gallery, Houston, Almine Rech Gallery, Paris, and Gagosian Gallery, New York

In February 2020, the Pace Gallery in London held a Turrell exhibition to demonstrate the "culmination of Turrell's lifelong pursuit".

== James Turrell Museum ==
On April 22, 2009, the James Turrell Museum opened in Colomé, Province of Salta, in Argentina. It was designed by Turrell after Donald M. Hess, owner of the winery and several of Turrell's works, told him he wanted to dedicate a museum to his work. It contains nine light installations, including a skyspace (Unseen Blue, 2002) and some drawings and prints.

== Collections ==
Turrell's work is represented in numerous public collections, including the Massachusetts Museum of Contemporary Art, North Adams; the Ringling Museum, Sarasota; the Centre for International Light Art, Unna; the Mattress Factory, Pittsburgh; Los Angeles County Museum of Art; the Solomon R. Guggenheim Museum, New York; the Henry Art Gallery, Seattle; Walker Art Center, Minneapolis; the de Young Museum, San Francisco; the Indianapolis Museum of Art, Indianapolis; the Spencer Museum of Art, Lawrence, Kansas; the National Gallery of Art, Washington, and the Academy Art Museum, Easton, Maryland. Internationally, his works have been installed at the Tate Modern, London; the Israel Museum, Jerusalem; Magasin III Museum for Contemporary Art, Stockholm, Sweden; the Museum SAN, Wonju; Panza Foundation, Varese; and the Welsh National Museum of Art, Cardiff.

In Japan, Turrell's works are in the collections of several museums, including the 21st Century Museum of Contemporary Art, Kanazawa and at the Chichu Art Museum at Benesse Art-Site in Naoshima, Kagawa. The Chichu Art Museum holds three works by Turrell, which are on permanent exhibition: the projection piece Afrum – Pale Blue (1968); Ganzfield work Open Field (2000); and skyspace Open Sky (2004). As part of the Chichu Art Museum's Art House Project, architect Tadao Ando designed a building named Minamidera ("Southern Temple") to accommodate a sensory-deprivation work by Turrell, Backside of the Moon, (1999). House of Light, (2000), which is a work commissioned for the first Echigo-Tsumari Art Field Triennial, is a building completely designed by Turrell that mixes traditional Japanese architecture with his signature light installations. House of Light also has a skyspace, whose view of the sunrise has been described as "the almost imperceptible change into deep blue was incredibly moving". 'Amarta', Turrell's collection, is located in the Republic of the Maldives' Patina Maldives, a luxury resort. [72]

== Awards ==
Turrell has received numerous awards in the arts, including a Guggenheim Fellowship for Fine Arts, The John D. and Catherine T. MacArthur Foundation Fellowship in 1984 and the National Medal of Arts in 2013., received Praemium Imperiale(2021)

In 2004, he was awarded an honorary doctorate by Haverford College.

== Bibliography ==
- Adcock, Craig: (1990) James Turrell: the art of light and space Berkeley: University of California Press, ISBN 0-520-06728-2 ISBN 0-520-06728-2
- De Rosa, Agostino: (2007) James Turrell: Geometrie di luce. Roden Crater Project Milan: Electa, ISBN 978-88-370-5363-5
- Didi-Huberman, Georges: L'homme qui marchait dans la couleur (The Man Who Walked in Colour) ISBN 978-2-7073-1736-0
- Turrell, James: (1999) Eclipse (Documents The Elliptic Ecliptic and Arcus, two temporary installations accompanying the last total eclipse of the 20th century), Ostfildern-Ruit [Germany]: Michael Hue-Williams Fine Art, London in association with Hatje Cantz ISBN 3-7757-0898-7
- Turrell, James: (2001) mit Beiträgen von Daniel Birnbaum et al., herausgegeben von Peter Noever The Other Horizon, An overview of Turrell's development from 1967 to 2001 Ostfildern-Ruit: Cantz ISBN 3-7757-9062-4
- A Companion Guide to the Welsh National Museum of Art. Cardiff: National Museum Wales Books. 2011. ISBN 978-0-72-000613-1.
- Govan, Michael and Christine Y. Kim: (2013) James Turrell: A Retrospective Los Angeles County Museum of Art and Prestel, US, ISBN 3-7913-5263-6
- Rencontres 9: James Turrell / Sébastien Pluot, Almine Rech Gallery, Editions Images Modernes, Paris, 2005, 175 pp.
- Pluot Sébastien, Light in its architectural settings, Après editions, Paris, 2005.

== Films ==
- Passageways DVD first published by Centre Pompidou 2006 then published by C.A. Productions 2017 Paris : a presentation of James Turrell's work and the Roden Crater project
- Art 21: James Turrell, Live Oak Friends Meeting house, PBS Documentary, Biography in text and online clip.
- ADN Automotive Design Network (Gilles Coudert & Sébastien Pluot, 14 minutes, a.p.r.e.s production, 2005) : présentation de l'intervention de James Turrell sur le bâtiment réalisé par l'architecte Jacques Ripault pour le centre de design de PSA Peugeot Citroën à Vélizy-Villacoublay, près de Paris
- Caisse des dépôts et consignations (Gilles Coudert et Sébastien Pluot, 11 minutes, a.p.r.e.s production, 2005); présentation du projet de James Turrell sur le nouveau bâtiment de la Caisse des dépôts et consignations réalisé à Paris en bord de Seine par l'architecte Christian Hauvette.

== See also ==
- Stuck Red/Stuck Blue (1970)
- Bubsy 3D: Bubsy Visits the James Turrell Retrospective (2013)
- Jesus is King (2019)
