= Jan De Cock =

Belgian artist

Jan De Cock (born 2 May 1976 in Etterbeek) is a contemporary Belgian visual artist. From the start of his career, his art has revolved around production and the ways in which an artist relates to the broad culturally-injected concept of Modernism. In 2003 Jan De Cock entered the competition Prix de la Jeune Peinture Belge (Prize for Young Belgian Painters). He is, after Luc Tuymans, only the second Belgian artist to have had a solo exposition at Tate Modern and the first living Belgian artist to have an exhibition at MoMA, which opened on 23 January 2008. Much of his work draws on visual and formal comparisons between early-20th century abstract art movements and contemporary design and mass production. During the first decade of his career the artist worked on the intersection of sculpture and architecture and he succeeded in extending the underlying functionalist consequences of the Russian Modernist artist El Lissitzky‘s Proun Room, thus completing a missing link within the modernist program yet to be completed in late twentieth century modernist art.

Since the second decade of the 21st century his works evolves around the concept of Romanticism. On several occasions, he stresses the independence from market controlled mechanisms which are in an outspoken opposition to a romantic and utopian stand. e.g. the integration of an already existing school in the artist's studio: The Brussels Art Institute.

From his exhibition ‘Eine Romantische Ausstellung onward the focus of his works shifts towards disruptive interventions in order to destabilise art market mechanisms.

After the departure from Brussels and the relocation of Jan De Cock's studio to Turin, Italy and then Bruges, Belgium and the closure of The Brussels Art_ Institute, The Bruges Art_ Institute was founded in 2019. Just like its predecessor The Brussels Art_ Institute, The Bruges Art_ Institute is invariably labeled a 'romantic place' (quote) by its founder Jan Frederik De Cock. The Bruges Art Institute is home to The Flemish Masters, Grandiose Shipyards and Jan De Cock Advisory. It is a complex of fine arts salons, a studio, a school where the various functions of living, working, studying are united in an anti-modernist way with a Wunderkammer, a showroom and a school.

He is represented by Francesca Minini in Milan.

== Art projects ==
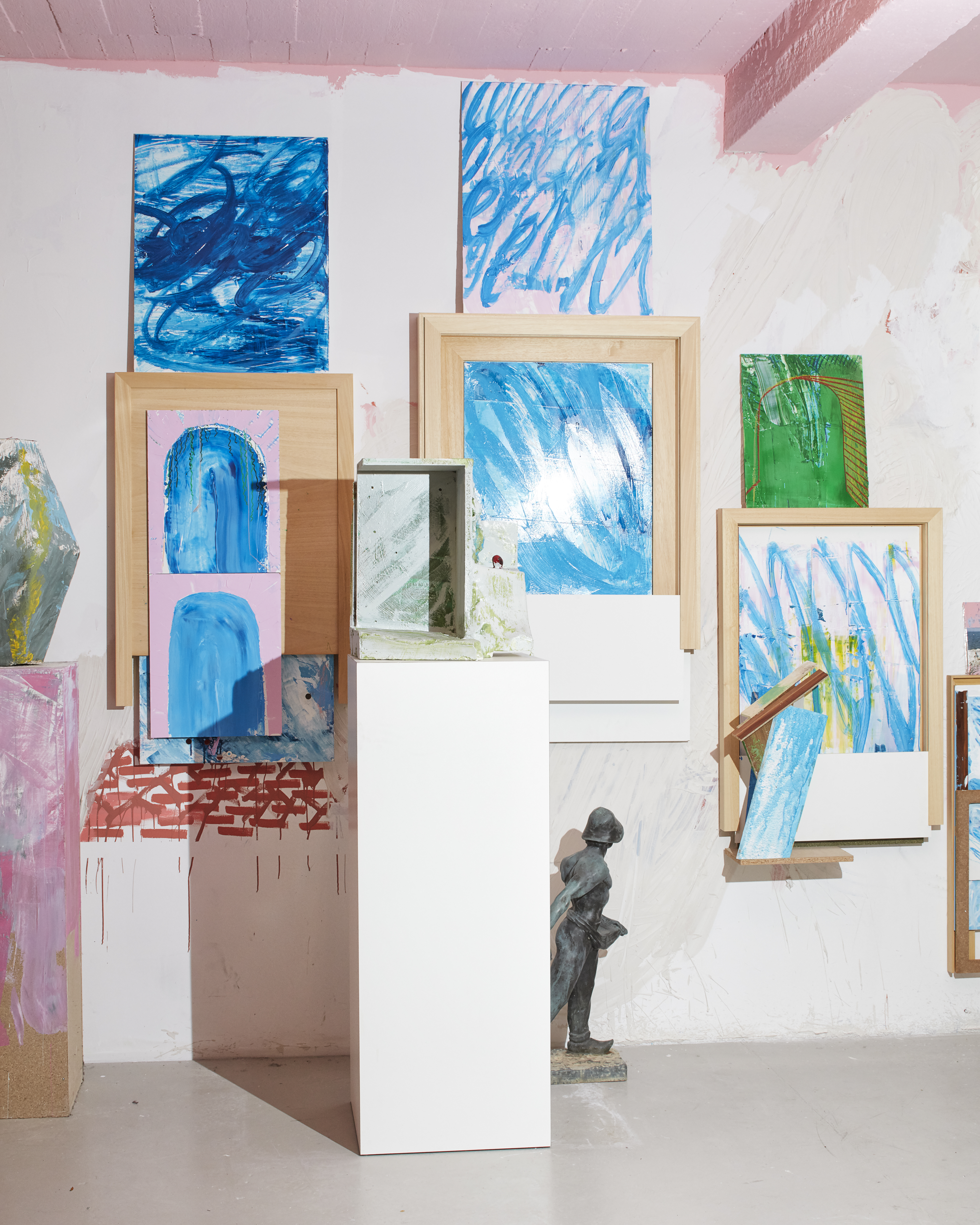
Abstract Capitalism II, at The Brussels Art_ Institute, Brussels

=== The Bruges Art_ Institute ===
After the departure from Brussels and the relocation of Jan De Cock's studio to Turin, Italy and then Bruges, Belgium and the closure of The Brussels Art_ Institute, The Bruges Art_ Institute was founded in 2019. Just like its predecessor The Brussels Art_ Institute, The Bruges Art_ Institute is invariably labeled a 'romantic place' (quote) by its founder Jan Frederik De Cock. The Bruges Art Institute is home to The Flemish Masters, Grandiose Shipyards and Jan De Cock Advisory. It is a complex of fine arts salons, a studio, a school where the various functions of living, working, studying are united in an anti-modernist way with a Wunderkammer, a showroom and a school.

=== The Brussels Art_ Institute ===
Jan De Cock is founder of The Brussels Art_ Institute (BAI), a multidisciplinary artist workspace and cooperation between the artist and school of Sint-Lukas, Brussels. The institute is located in Anderlecht along the Zenne and Brussels-South station.

=== Abstract Capitalism ===
Series of exhibitions, taking place in 2015 and 2016 at the gallery of Office Baroque in Brussels. The latter exhibition featured 18 new “Abstract Capitalist” sculptures as well as 9 “Memorial” drawings. In December 2016 Abstract Capitalism II opened at The Brussels Art_ Institute, a 'memorial exhibition' in the form of an old school salon, revealing how artists' houses and studios have become the object of public fascination and - at the same time - misunderstanding about art, creator and the aesthetic. It entails a series of 124 studies of homages to the idea of the arcade and the studio.

=== Everything For You ===
This series of exhibitions tackles the concept of the free market. The first edition Everything For You, Mexico City opened in the spring of 2013 in Galería Hilario Galguera, in Mexico City. Jan De Cock grants the city a number of different sculptural Gifts, with which he rejects today's supply-and-demand economy by giving the inhabitants of the city a gift pur sang, voluntarily and in places where no one has asked for them. Before the Gifts are exhibited, they are first activated in the city by means of a photographic portrait. These photos are then printed in a Memorial Paper, accompanied by two essays and photographs of other cities, and spread over the city. Twenty cities are featured in this project, including Mexico City, Otegem, Strombeek, Havana, Kiev, Carrara, Belfast, Hong Kong, Herford, Liverpool, Casablanca, Antwerp, Godarville, New York, Tokyo, Paris and Brussels.

=== Jacqueline Kennedy Onassis, Staatliche Kunsthalle Baden-Baden, Germany, 2011 ===
Jacqueline Kennedy Onassis (or JKO) is the encompassing generic term for the exhibition project. The project took place between September 2011 and June 2012 and can be divided into two separate but interrelated parts. Part 1: A series of six Cahiers was published as a periodical picture story to mark the project. White-out Studio systematically exhibited the Cahiers as five different presentations that were spread over a period of five months (September 10, 2011- January 31, 2012). Part 2 : The Staatliche Kunsthalle Baden-Baden subsequently presented the exhibition Jacqueline Kennedy Onassis (March 10, 2012 - June 24, 2012) and the catalogue 'Jan De Cock: Handbuch Jacqueline Kennedy Onassis. Eine Romantische Austellung'.

In this exhibition Jan De Cock unfolds a complex, interlocking system of fragments, changing the white rooms of the Kunsthalle and the glass pavilion of the Stadtmuseum into a landscape of splintered units that seemingly has no point of departure, nor one of arrival. The works shown in the exhibition were made using industrially produced materials. A series of sculptures entitled Romantische Skulpturen consists of grand steel profile frames measuring almost 3m x 3m, upon which precisely crafted layers of coated wood and other materials have been attached. The works bring to mind expansive objects from former series by Jan De Cock, that now seem to have been shoved against the wall. In other words, entire rooms have been transformed into layered reliefs. For De Cock, the layering and unkempt surfaces are again references to his studio process.

=== Repromotion, BOZAR, Brussels, 2009 ===
This exhibition was sculptured and organized within its space as a sequence from a fictional film. Jan De Cock probed the very sources of film and played with movement, repetition, and reproduction, which are the main concepts for reading the exhibition. The montage took place from room to room, following a directed path, indicated by three Herculean archers by the sculptor Antoine Bourdelle. With Repromotion, the artist examined the issue of representing movement in modern sculpture or "the development of the artist studio in space". Jan De Cock chose BOZAR because of his personal relationship to the institution.

=== Denkmal 11, Museum of Modern Art, West 53 Street, New York, 2008 ===
Jan De Cock's first US museum exhibition took place in 2008. A multipart installation features a complex display of framed images punctuated by boxlike plywood modules. Photographs and photomontages in austere black frames are clustered on the walls, some as high as the ceiling or as low as the floor. In some of these groupings, smaller photographs are arranged on white backgrounds. Others are partly obscured by white mats with peekaboo cutouts, or by sculptural interventions in the form of slotted plywood boxes. The photographic material was created in response to the specific location in which it will be screened, and shows different objects from the collection of the MoMA, in combination with images from art, architecture or film history.

=== Denkmal 4, Casa del Fascio, Piazza del Popolo 4, Como, 2006 ===
In 2006 Jan De Cock created a series of in-situ sculptures in Casa del Fascio that entered into dialogue with the existing architectural shapes of two different locations in the region of Lombardy in Northern Italy: the gallery Francesca Minini in Milan and Galleria Massimo Minini in Brescia. Daniel Buren was then invited to elaborate in-situ on the museum reference frame created by De Cock, and hence to complete the work. Buren's intervention consisted of putting his well-known motive of green vertical ( 8.7 cm ) wide stripes onto De Cock's sculptures and using mirrors to interact with the piece.

=== Denkmal 53, Tate Modern, London, 2005 ===
With Denkmal 53, Jan De Cock built his own museum by creating simple constructions that refer to the formal language of the building of Tate Modern, especially the window distribution and structure of the Central Hall. The installation uses vistas and blind walls to redirect the viewer's gaze and hide certain aspects of an existing edifice to reveal others.

=== Randschade Fig.7 / Collateral Damage Fig.7, Museum Fine Arts and S.M.A.K., Ghent, 2002 ===
This exhibition was conceived as an orchestrated walking tour with pauses and hindrances: the sculptures in the middle of the rooms are spread over different exhibition spaces, thus reducing the available space and creating a trajectory past the old masters that sometimes leads to a dead-end. The lines, areas, and solid colours of the sculptures harmonize on an abstract level with the furnishings, the architecture, and the paintings, resulting in a Gesamtkunstwerk.

=== Vertigo or the Era of Free Catalogues, Part 2, Felix Hap Park, Brussels, 2000 ===
This installation was created for the group exhibition Beeld in Park in 2000 (June 30, 2000 - October 15, 2000) for which Jan De Cock created a new entrance, namely the carriage entry of a private residence that opened onto the public space of the Jean-Félix Hap Park. The pavilion was built as an extension of the new entrance, adjacent to an 18th-century gateway building in the classical style. An extension "module" measuring 85 square meters divided the park into two areas.

== Publications ==
- Jacqueline Kennedy Onassis, Disambiguation #1 Saturation, #2 Spectacle, #3 Value, #4 Imitation, #5 Fanaticism, #6 Overcome, 2012 576 pages
- Handbook A Romantic Exhibition, Staatliche Kunsthalle Baden-Baden, curated by Johan Holten, Buchhandlung Walther König, 2012
- Denkmal ISBN 9789080842441, 2008 The Museum of Modern Art, New York 210 pages
- Denkmal ISBN 9789080842434, 2008 Collaboration with Daniel Buren, Italy 650 pages
- Denkmal ISBN 9080842427, 2006 Tate Modern, London 456 pages
- Denkmal ISBN 9080842419, 2004 De Appel, Amsterdam 556 page

== Solo exhibitions ==
- 2016 : Abstract Capitalism, The Brussels Art_ Institute, Brussels (Belgium)
- 2016 : Abstract Capitalism, Office Baroque, Brussels (Belgium)
- 2015 : Sculpturecommunism, Office Baroque, Brussels (Belgium)
- 2013 : Everything For You, Otegem, Deweer Gallery, Otegem (Belgium)
- 2013 : Everything For You, Mexico-City, Galeria Hilario Galguera, Mexico-City (Mexico)
- 2013 : Jacqueline Kennedy Onassis, Romantik IX, Galerie Fons Welters, Amsterdam (Netherlands)
- 2012 : Jacqueline Kennedy Onassis, A Commercial Exhibition, Galeria Filomena Soares, Lissabon (Portugal)
- 2012 : Occupying the Museum, Galerie Ronny Van de Velde, Knokke
- 2012 : Jacqueline Kennedy Onassis, A Romantic Exhibition, Staatliche Kunsthalle Baden-Baden, Baden-Baden (Germany)
- 2011 : Jacqueline Kennedy Onassis, White-Out Studio, Knokke-Heist
- 2011 : Improvise and Overcome, KIOSK, Gent
- 2010 : Repromotion, Francesca Minini, Milano (Italy)
- 2010 : Repromotion, Galerie Fons Welters, Amsterdam (Netherlands)
- 2009 : Repromotion, Gallery Luis Campaña, Berlin (Germany)
- 2009 : Repromotion, Palais des Beaux-Arts, Brussels
- 2008 : Modern is changing fig. 4, Stella Lohaus Gallery, Antwerp
- 2008 : Modern is changing fig. 3, Gallery Luis Campaña, Berlin (Germany)
- 2008 : Modern is changing fig. 1, Galerie Fons Welters (Netherlands)
- 2008 : Denkmal 11, Museum of Modern Art, 11 West 53 Street, New York (USA)
- 2007 : Denkmal 70, Sint-Lukas Hogeschool, Paleizenstraat 70, Brussels
- 2007 : Denkmal 87, Glenn Horowitz Bookseller, 87 Newton Lane, Easthampton (USA)
- 2007 : Denkmal 1, Art Brussels, Belgiëplein 1, Brussels
- 2006 : Denkmal 4, Casa del Fascio, Piazza del Popolo 4, Como (Italy)
- 2006 : Denkmal 4, Casa del Fascio, Piazza del Popolo 4, Como - Massimo Minini Gallery, Brescia (Italy)
- 2006 : Denkmal 4, Casa del Fascio, Piazza del Popolo 4, Como – Francesca Minini Gallery, Milano (Italy)
- 2006 : Denkmal 25, Haus Konstruktiv, Selnaustrasse 25, Zürich (Switzerland)
- 2006 : Denkmal 47, Stella Lohaus Gallery, Vlaamse Kaai 47, Antwerp
- 2006 : Denkmal 1901, Convention Center, 1901 Convention Center Drive, Miami Beach (USA)
- 2005 : Denkmal 53, Tate Modern, Bankside 53, London SE1 9TG (UK)
- 2005 : Denkmal 7, Schirn Kunsthalle, Römerberg 7, Frankfurt am Main (Germany)
- 2005 : Denkmal 5–12–3, Minami Aoyama 5–12–3, Minato-ku, Tokyo (Japan)
- 2004 : Denkmal 23, Palais des Beaux-Arts, Rue Ravenstein 23, Brussels
- 2004 : Denkmal 47, Stella Lohaus Gallery, Vlaamse Kaai 47, Antwerp
- 2004 : Denkmal 9, Henry Van de Velde Universiteitsbibliotheek, Rozier 9, Gent
- 2004 : Denkmal 1a, Gallery Luis Campaña, An der Schanz 1a, Köln (Germany)
- 2003 : Denkmal 3, Kerstin Engholm Gallery, Schleifmuhlgasse 3, Wien (Austria)
- 2003 : Denkmal 10, De Appel, Nieuwe Spiegelstraat 10, Amsterdam (Netherlands)
- 2003 : Art Statement, Art 34 Basel (Switzerland)
- 2002 : Art Basel Miami Beach, Art Positions (USA)
- 2002 : Randschade Fig.9 / Collateral Damage Fig.9, Gallery Fons Welters, Amsterdam, 2002 (Netherlands)
- 2002 : Randschade Fig.7 / Collateral Damage Fig.7, Museum voor Schone Kunsten en S.M.A.K., Gent
- 2001 : Randschade Fig. 4, Gallery Fons Welters, Amsterdam (Netherlands)
- 1999 : Argos, Brussels
