= Janet Morgan =

Janet Morgan may refer to:

- Janet Morgan (squash player) (1921–1990), English squash and tennis player
- Janet Morgan, Lady Balfour of Burleigh (born 1945), Canadian-born English writer and historian
- Janet Ellen Morgan, American artist, author, and teacher

== See also ==
- Janet Morgan Riggs (born c. 1955), American psychologist and academic administrator
