= U.S. News & World Report Best Colleges Ranking =

Annual ranking of American colleges and universities

The cover of U.S. News & World Report's 2022 "Best Colleges Ranking" magazine

U.S. News & World Report Best Colleges Ranking is an annual set of rankings of colleges and universities in the United States, which was first published by U.S. News & World Report in 1983. It has been described as the most influential institutional ranking in the country.

The Best Colleges rankings have raised controversy, and they have been denounced by several education experts. Detractors argue that they rely on self-reported, sometimes fraudulent data by the institutions, encourage gamesmanship by institutions looking to improve their rank, imply a false precision by deriving an ordinal ranking from questionable data, contribute to the admissions frenzy by unduly highlighting prestige, and ignore individual fit by comparing institutions with widely diverging missions on the same scale.

== Methodology ==
In 2023, U.S. News & World Report ranked nearly 1,500 universities and colleges.

The following are the elements used in the National University rankings in the 2023 edition:

- "Outcomes" (52%):
  - Graduation and retention rates (21%): the proportion of each entering class earning a degree in six years or less (16%), and the proportion of first-year entering students who returned the following fall (5%)
  - Graduation rate performance (10%): actual six-year graduation rates compared with predictions for the fall 2014 entering class
  - Social mobility (11%): how well schools graduated students who received federal Pell Grants (6%), and graduation rates and performance of first generation students (5%)
  - Graduate indebtedness (5%): typical average accumulated federal loan debt by student borrowers
  - College Graduate Earning Potential (5%): amount of college graduates with federal loans 4 years after graduating are earning more than a typical high school graduate
- "Faculty resources" (11%):
  - Faculty salary (6%)
  - Student-faculty ratio (3%)
  - Proportion of faculty who are full time (2%)
- "Expert opinion" (20%): presidents, provosts and deans of admissions rate the academic quality of peer institutions with which they are familiar on a scale of 1 (marginal) to 5 (distinguished)
- "Financial resources" (8%): the average per-student spending on instruction, research, student services and related educational expenditures
- "Student selectivity" (5%): the standardized test scores of admitted students and the proportion of admitted students in upper percentiles of their high school class
- "Faculty Research" (4%): Amount of citations to papers and research attributed to faculty while employed at the college

The publication is split into four categories: National Universities, Liberal Arts Colleges, Regional Universities, and Regional Colleges, with the latter two categories further split into North, South, Midwest, and West.

A 2014 study published in Research in Higher Education removed the mystique of the U.S. News ranking process by producing a ranking model that faithfully recreated U.S. News outcomes and quantified the inherent "noise" in the rankings for all nationally ranked universities. The model developed provided detailed insight into the U.S. News ranking process. It allowed the impact of changes to U.S. News sub factors to be studied when variation between universities and within sub factors was present. Numerous simulations were run using this model to understand the amount of change required for a university to improve its rank or move into the top 20. Results show that for a university ranked in the mid-30s it would take a significant amount of additional resources, directed in a very focused way, to become a top-ranked national university, and that rank changes of up to +/− 4 points should be considered "noise".

== 2025–26 rankings ==
U.S. News & World Report named Princeton University as the highest ranked university, using criteria including degree offerings at undergraduate and graduate levels and research output.

=== Map ===
Top 25 colleges in the 2025-26 rankings

== Reception ==
For their 2014 release day, usnews.com garnered 2.6 million unique visitors and 18.9 million page views.

Studies show that the U.S. News ranking influences college applications:

- A University of Michigan study from 2010 found that university rankings in the United States significantly affect institutions' applications and admissions. The research analyzed the effects of the U.S. News & World Report rankings, showing a lasting effect on college applications and admissions by students in the top 10% of their class. In addition, they found that rankings influence survey assessments of reputation by college presidents at peer institutions, such that rankings and reputation are becoming much more similar over time.
- A 2011 study by Leadership and Management found that a one-rank improvement led to a 0.9% increase in the number of applicants.

Some universities have made it a specific goal to reach a particular level in the U.S. News & World Report rankings:

- Clemson University's president James Frazier Barker made it a public goal in 2001 to rise to a top 20 public university in the U.S. News & World Report rankings, and made specific changes, including reducing class size and altering the presentation of teacher salaries, in an effort to perform better in the publication's statistical rankings.
- Arizona State University in 2007 tied the university president's pay to an increase in the school's placement in the U.S. News rankings.
- Belmont University president Robert Fisher stated in 2010, "Rising to the Top 5 in U.S. News represents a key element of Belmont's Vision 2015 plan."

=== Criticism ===
During the 1990s, several educational institutions in the United States were involved in a movement to boycott the U.S. News & World Report college rankings survey. The first was Reed College, which stopped submitting the survey in 1995. The survey was also criticized by Alma College, Stanford University, and St. John's College during the late 1990s. SAT scores play a role in the U.S. News & World Report college rankings even though U.S. News is not empowered with the ability to formally verify or recalculate the scores that are represented to them by schools. Since the mid-1990s there have been many instances documented by the popular press wherein schools lied about their SAT scores in order to obtain a higher ranking. An exposé in the San Francisco Chronicle reported that the elements in the methodology of U.S. News & World Report are redundant and are driven by financial incentives.

In 2000, the National Opinion Research Center reviewed the methodology, and stated that the weights "lack any defensible empirical or theoretical basis". A New York Times article in 2003 likewise reported that, given the U.S. News weighting methodology, "it's easy to guess who's going to end up on top: the Big Three, Harvard, Yale, and Princeton round out the first three essentially every year. When asked how he knew his system was sound, Mel Elfin, the rankings' founder, often answered that he knew it because those three schools always landed on top. When a new lead statistician, Amy Graham, changed the formula in 1999 to one she considered more statistically valid, the California Institute of Technology jumped to first place. Ms. Graham soon left, and a modified system pushed Princeton back to No. 1 the next year."

On June 19, 2007, during the annual meeting of the Annapolis Group, members discussed the letter to college presidents asking them not to participate in the "reputation survey" section of the U.S. News & World Report survey, which comprises 25% of the ranking. As a result, "a majority of the approximately 80 presidents at the meeting said that they did not intend to participate in the U.S. News reputational rankings in the future". The statement also said that its members "have agreed to participate in the development of an alternative common format that presents information about their colleges for students and their families to use in the college search process". This database will be web-based and developed in conjunction with higher-education organizations, including the National Association of Independent Colleges and Universities and the Council of Independent Colleges.

On June 22, 2007, U.S. News & World Report editor Robert Morse issued a response in which he argued, "in terms of the peer assessment survey, we at U.S. News firmly believe the survey has significant value because it allows us to measure the 'intangibles' of a college that we can't measure through statistical data. Plus, the reputation of a school can help get that all-important first job and plays a key part in which grad school someone will be able to get into. The peer survey is by nature subjective, but the technique of asking industry leaders to rate their competitors is a commonly accepted practice. The results from the peer survey also can act to level the playing field between private and public colleges".

In reference to the alternative database discussed by the Annapolis Group, Morse also argued, "It's important to point out that the Annapolis Group's stated goal of presenting college data in a common format has been tried before ... U.S. News has been supplying this exact college information for many years already. And it appears that NAICU will be doing it with significantly less comparability and functionality. U.S. News first collects all these data (using an agreed-upon set of definitions from the Common Data Set). Then we post the data on our website in easily accessible, comparable tables. In other words, the Annapolis Group and the others in the NAICU initiative actually are following the lead of U.S. News".

The question of college rankings and their impact on admissions gained greater attention in March 2007, when Sarah Lawrence College outgoing president Michele Tolela Myers, wrote an op-ed that U.S. News & World Report, when not given SAT scores for a university, chooses to simply rank the college with an invented SAT score of approximately one standard deviation, which she estimated was roughly 200 SAT points behind those of peer colleges, reasoning that SAT-optional universities will, because of their test-optional nature, accept higher numbers of less academically capable students.

Some higher education experts, such as Kevin Carey of Education Sector, have asserted that U.S. News & World Report's college rankings system is merely a list of criteria that mirrors the superficial characteristics of elite colleges and universities. According to Carey, the U.S. News ranking system is deeply flawed. Instead of focusing on the fundamental issues of how well colleges and universities educate their students and how well they prepare them to be successful after college, the magazine's rankings are almost entirely a function of three factors: fame, wealth, and exclusivity. He suggests that there are more important characteristics parents and students should research to select colleges, such as how well students are learning and how likely students are to earn a degree.

In a 2011 article on the Sarah Lawrence controversy, Peter Sacks of The Huffington Post criticized the U.S. News rankings' centering on test scores and denounced the magazine's "best colleges" list as a scam:

In the U.S. News worldview of college quality, it matters not a bit what students actually learn on campus, or how a college actually contributes to the intellectual, ethical and personal growth of students while on campus, or how that institution contributes to the public good...and then, when you consider that student SAT scores are profoundly correlated [to] parental income and education levels – the social class that a child is born into and grows up with – you begin to understand what a corrupt emperor 'America's Best Colleges' really is. The ranking amounts to little more than a pseudo-scientific and yet popularly legitimate tool for perpetuating inequality between educational haves and have nots – the rich families from the poor ones, and the well-endowed schools from the poorly endowed ones.

The U.S. News college rankings are widely denounced by many higher education experts. Detractors argue that they rely on self-reported, sometimes fraudulent data by the institutions, encourage gamesmanship by institutions looking to improve their rank, imply a false precision by deriving an ordinal ranking from questionable data, contribute to the admissions frenzy by unduly highlighting prestige, and ignore individual fit by comparing institutions with widely diverging missions on the same scale. In 2022, a professor challenged the validity of the rankings saying that he was unable to replicate the results when examining the data.

In 2022, U.S. Secretary of Education Miguel Cardona declared ranking systems akin to U.S. News to be "a joke." Speaking at a Spring 2023 conference organized by Yale and Harvard Law Schools, amidst a backlash over the influential law school rankings; Cardona stated that they have "created an unhealthy obsession with selectivity" and that “We need a culture change".

Also in 2022, Yale Law School, ranked at the top of the U.S. News & World Report Best Law Schools rankings since the publication's 1990 launch, announced that it was withdrawing its participation. The school's dean said "The U.S. News rankings were profoundly flawed. Its approach not only fails to advance the legal profession, but stands squarely in the way of progress." Harvard Law School and UC Berkeley School of Law quickly followed suit. Subsequently, law schools at Georgetown, Columbia, Stanford, University of Michigan, Duke, Northwestern, UCLA, UC Irvine, UC Davis, University of Pennsylvania, University of Washington, and New York University also withdrew from the rankings, citing similar reasoning. Yale spawning a boycott of its rankings system did not diminish its U.S. News ranking in 2023.

As of 2023, few undergraduate schools had joined the graduate school exodus that followed Yale's 2022 withdrawal. The New York Times reported in September 2023 that the status quo reflects a "psychic hold that the rankings have on American higher education, even for the country’s most renowned schools... an easy way to reach and enchant possible applicants..."

Changes to the ranking system, in 2023, following a U.S. News "listening tour" of schools, engaged its critics, which the publication failed to impress with any meaningful reforms.

In January 2023, medical schools at Harvard, Stanford, Columbia, the University of Pennsylvania and the Icahn School of Medicine at Mount Sinai all announced that they would withdraw their cooperation from the U.S. News & World Report rankings as well.

In June 2023, Columbia University announced their undergraduate schools would no longer participate, following the lead of its law, medical, and nursing schools. A press release cited concerns that such rankings unduly influence applicants and "distill a university’s profile into a composite of data categories." Its undergraduate program had dropped from second to 18th place in the 2022-2023 rankings after February 2022 revelations by Columbia professor Michael Thaddeus that the university had submitted faulty data.

The changes to the rankings factors, released with the 2023-24 edition, were criticized as evidence of unreliable methodology. Ted Mitchell, president of the American Council on Education, declared the many examples of abruptly altered results in its 2023 college rankings as "yet more evidence that rankings are not and never have been reliable indicators of quality."

== See also ==
- America's Top Colleges, Forbes' annual ranking of top colleges
- Fiske Guide to Colleges, the most popular non-ranking college guide in the U.S.
