= Katherine Haley Will =

American academic administrator

Katherine Haley

13th President of Gettysburg College
- In office 2004–2008
- Preceded by: Gordon A. Haaland
- Succeeded by: Janet Morgan Riggs

Personal details
- Education: Tufts University; University of Illinois at Urbana-Champaign
- Profession: Professor

Katherine Haley is an American academic administrator who served as the 13th president (and first woman in the position) of Gettysburg College in Gettysburg, Pennsylvania from 2004 until 2008. She also served as chair of the Annapolis Group, the presidents’ organization of the nation's leading liberal arts colleges.

== Background ==
Haley attended Carleton College (MN) and received her B.A. degree from Tufts University and her Ph.D. degree from the University of Illinois at Urbana-Champaign (Victorian Literature).

== Career ==
Haley was the first woman provost at Kenyon College (OH), as well as dean of graduate study and director of general education at Augustana College. In 1999, she became the 13th President (and first woman in the position) of Whittier College. She joined Gettysburg College as their 13th president in 2004 and became chair of the Annapolis Group (an organization which represents over 100 liberal arts colleges) in 2007.

In 2009, Haley joined the executive search firm Witt/Kieffer, and over seven years conducted numerous leadership searches in higher education, including 40 presidential searches.

In 2016, Haley founded her own boutique higher education and executive search firm—Haley Associates.

Katherine Haley has written extensively about higher education and made presentations at a wide variety of national higher education conferences.

Haley has held leadership positions in a number of national higher education associations. She has served as chair of board of the Annapolis Group, the professional organization of the presidents of the nation's leading liberal arts colleges. She also served on the boards of the National Association of Independent Colleges and Universities, the Council of Independent Colleges, the American Council of Academic Deans, the Eisenhower Institute, the Lincoln Prize Board and the Gettysburg Foundation. She is a current member of the Board of Trustees of Thomas College in Waterville, Maine.

== Annapolis Group statement on college rankings ==
Haley formerly chaired the Annapolis Group. On 19 June 2007, during its annual meeting members discussed a letter which was sent to college presidents asking them not to participate in the U.S. News & World Report reputational survey portion of the annual rankings survey. As a result, "a majority of the approximately 80 presidents at the meeting said that they did not intend to participate in the U.S. News reputational rankings in the future." However, the decision to fill out the reputational survey or not will be left up to each individual college as: "the Annapolis Group is not a legislative body and any decision about participating in the US News rankings rests with the individual institutions."

The statement also said that its members "have agreed to participate in the development of an alternative common format that presents information about their colleges for students and their families to use in the college search process." This database will be web based and developed in conjunction with higher education organizations including the National Association of Independent Colleges and Universities and the Council of Independent Colleges.

Haley discussed this decision further in a 9 July 2007 article for The Washington Post. In this article, Haley states that this decision was not based upon "a lack of concern about providing accurate, comprehensive information to help students and their families make decisions about college." Rather, she argued against the methodology of the U.S. News rankings. In particular, she argues against "the largest single factor in the U.S. News rating formula" which is the reputational survey as, "it is unrealistic to expect academic officials to know enough about hundreds of institutions to fairly evaluate the quality of their programs." Haley then argues that, "by contrast, 1 percent of the U.S. News ratings formula is assigned to student-to-faculty ratios, which many faculty members and students consider the most important factor in educational experience." Haley states that the members of the Annapolis Group will offer the same information in an alternative, free, format which will not rank schools, as, "an educational experience can't be reduced to one number, a school's so-called rank. The simplicity of a rank is understandably more appealing than spending hours poring over college catalogues and visiting campuses, but myriad complex variables can't be reduced to a single number." Instead, Haley asks students and parents to "compare schools on a variety of factors [...] they should visit campuses and go on what feels like a good match rather than relying on filtered or secondhand information. We must encourage students to look inside their hearts and trust their instincts when it comes to choosing a college, not whether parents or friends think a university is cool or prestigious."

== Notes ==
Academic offices
Preceded by Gordon A. Haaland	President of Gettysburg College; 2004–2008	Succeeded by Janet Morgan Riggs
