= Education Conservancy =

Non-profit organization

The Education Conservancy is an American educational non-profit organization headed by director Lloyd Thacker. It describes its goal as being "committed to improving college admission processes for students, colleges and high schools."

== Criticism of college rankings ==
In May 2007, a movement criticizing the practice of college rankings was initiated by Thacker. It follows previous movements in the U.S. and Canada (by schools in the 1990s such as Reed College, Stanford University, and Alma College, as well as a number of universities in Canada in 2006) that have criticized the practice of college rankings.

The Presidents Letter (dated May 10, 2007), which was developed by Thacker, was sent to college and university presidents in the United States in May 2007. The letter does not ask for a full boycott but rather states:

While we believe colleges and universities may want to cooperate in providing data to publications for the purposes of rankings, we believe such data provision should be limited to data which is collected in accord with clear, shared professional standards (not the idiosyncratic standards of any single publication), and to data which is required to be reported to state or federal officials or which the institution believes (in accord with good accountability) should routinely be made available to any member of the public who seeks it.

Instead, it asks presidents not to participate in the "reputational survey" portion of the overall survey (this section accounts for 25% of the total rank and asks college presidents to give their subjective opinion of other colleges). The letter also asks presidents not to use the rankings as a form of publicity:

Among other reasons, we believe … rankings: imply a false precision and authority that is not warranted by the data they use; obscure important differences in educational mission in aligning institutions on a single scale; say nothing or very little about whether students are actually learning at particular colleges or universities; encourage wasteful spending and gamesmanship in institutions' pursuing improved rankings; overlook the importance of a student in making education happen and overweight the importance of a university's prestige in that process; and degrade for students the educational value of the college search process.

Twelve college and university presidents originally signed the letter in early May. The letter currently has 61 signatures, though others may be added at a later date.

=== Debate ===
A debate concerning the decision of the Annapolis Group to offer an alternative set of data as part of the movement challenging commercial college rankings was published as a podcast in the June 25, 2007, issue of Inside Higher Ed. The debate was between Thacker and U.S. News editor Brian Kelly. The debate was moderated by Inside Higher Ed reporter Scott Jaschik.

== See also ==
- List of colleges and universities which have signed the Presidents Letter
