= U.S. News & World Report Best Global Universities Ranking =

Annual ranking of international universities

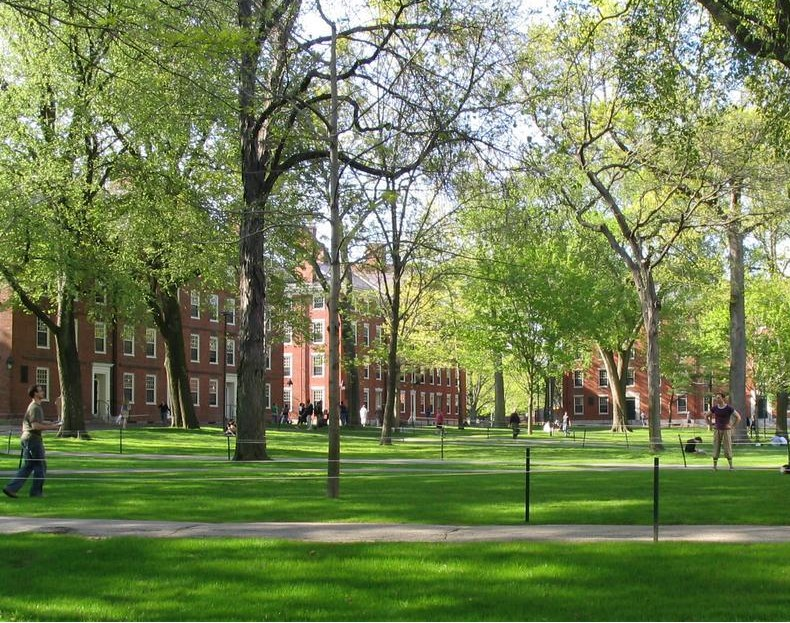
Harvard University in Cambridge, Massachusetts, U.S. News & World Report's top ranked university as of 2024-25

The Best Global Universities ranking by U.S. News & World Report is an annual ranking of world universities. On October 28, 2014, U.S. News, which began ranking American universities in 1983, published its inaugural global ranking, assessing 500 universities in 49 countries. That first installment of the Best Global Universities Ranking was published without prior announcement, with U.S. News later clarifying that the rankings of that year were a trial balloon for the publication's entrance into the global university rankings field. After pre-announcing the rankings of next year, in 2016, the periodical formalized the global university rankings as part of its regular annual programming. Having made official the ranking methodology, it disclosed that it is based on 10 different indicators that measure universities' academic performance and reputations. The ranking has since been revised and expanded to cover 1,500 institutions in 81 countries and now includes five regional and 28 subject rankings. Employing 13 indicators and based largely on data provided by Clarivate, the U.S. News global ranking is methodologically different from its ranking of American institutions; global universities are rated using factors such as research reputation, academic publications, and the number of highly cited papers.

Inside Higher Ed noted in 2014 that U.S. News is entering the international college and university rankings area that is already "dominated by three major global university rankings": the QS World University Rankings, the Times Higher Education World University Rankings, and the Academic Ranking of World Universities. U.S. News' chief data strategist, Robert Morse, stated "we're well-known in the field for doing academic rankings so we thought it was a natural extension of the other rankings that we're doing." Morse pointed out that U.S. News is "the first American publisher to enter the global rankings space", given Times Higher Education and QS are both British, while the Academic Ranking of World Universities is Chinese.

The Washington Post noted that some U.S. institutions rank lower on U.S. News' global ranking than on their domestic ranking, in particular Princeton, which was named the top university in the U.S. in the 2015 domestic ranking but was ranked behind nine other U.S. universities (and three U.K. universities) in the 2015 global ranking. This was attributed to the global ranking concentrating on "research prowess", while the "undergraduate experience", for which uniform international data is hard to obtain, was not included. Forbes, which, along with many others, has roundly criticized the U.S. News ranking of American colleges, praised the U.S. News global ranking as being mostly based upon "objective measures" and representing a "worthy" evaluation scheme.

== 2026-2027 rankings ==
As of U.S. News & World Report's most recent 2026-2027 rankings, which considered 2,250 institutions from over 100 countries using 13 indicators that "measure their academic research performance and their global and regional reputations", the top ten universities are:

1. Harvard University (Cambridge, Massachusetts, USA)
2. Massachusetts Institute of Technology (Cambridge, Massachusetts, USA)
3. Stanford University (Stanford, California, USA)
4. University of Oxford (Oxford, UK)
5. University of Cambridge (Cambridge, UK)
6. Tsinghua University (Beijing, China)
7. University of California Berkeley (Berkeley, California, USA)
8. Yale University (New Haven, Connecticut, USA)
9. University College London (London, UK)
10. Columbia University (New York City, USA)
