= List of United States graduate business school rankings =

List of United States business school rankings is a tabular listing of some of the business schools and their affiliated universities located in the United States that are included in one or more of the rankings of full-time Master of Business Administration programs. Rankings are typically published by magazines or websites. This list is not a comprehensive list of business schools in the United States. These rankings are a subset of college and university rankings. Business schools are university-level institutions generally affiliated with a university or college that produces students who attain business administration degrees. Most of the schools listed in the rankings below are accredited by the Association to Advance Collegiate Schools of Business. Some of the publications shown here have related rankings for undergraduate, part-time and executive curricula.

There is currently some controversy among faculty and administrators in American institutions of higher education regarding the request by the surveyors to have college presidents give their subjective opinion of other colleges because some of the methodologies are deemed misleading and a disservice. This has resulted in a movement surrounding the President's letter.

== History ==
Most modern university ranking systems are comparably young. The origins of ranking educational institutions based on their academic and other performance are usually traced back towards the end of the 19th / the beginning if the 20th century.

== Marketing significance ==
Business school rankings are important to the various business schools because they are an important marketing tool used to recruit top students, and lure recruiters from the top companies. Business schools attempt to achieve higher rankings in order that they may obtain the top students who will over the course of their careers most likely benefit the school by achieving high ranking positions, attaining great influence, and accumulating great wealth. Such students often are able to help other students attain better (higher paying, more respected and more influential) jobs. Students use the rankings to choose their school, and creators of the rankings produce them to aid in this decision.

More than half of recruiters said they believe the quality of MBA graduates is the same or better currently compared with past years. Some of the most renowned schools, such as Harvard and Stanford, do not rank as highly as their stature might suggest. Recruiters complain that they often find graduates of some of the most famous institutions more arrogant and less collegial than the MBAs they meet at other schools. Recruiters also noted that "some of the large, elite schools also don't seem to enjoy as many close, personal relationships with recruiters as smaller MBA programs do."

== Ranking techniques ==
The rankings are based on a variety of factors such as standardized test scores of students, salary of recent graduates, survey results of graduates and/or recruiters, the specific schools that choose to participate in a market survey, the number of top companies recruiting at the school and a variety of attributes. The ratings vary significantly by method used to determine the success of each program. For instance, the Forbes and Financial Times results are based on long-term graduate career progress concerns, the Bloomberg Businessweek and Economist polls evaluate short-term experiences of the students with their program, U.S. News & World Report consider the recent experiences of recruiters with the program, and other rankings like the Aspen Institute Beyond Grey Pinstripes measure integration of sustainability material into business programs.

The following is a short summary of the different recognized rankings:

=== Main rankings ===
==== Financial Times ====
A British newspaper, Financial Times poll, with 10,000 respondents to nearly 23,000 electronic questionnaires of alumni from 155 qualifying business schools, began in July 2006. All internationally accredited programs that are at least five years old and that have produced at least 30 graduates in each of the last three years were solicited. 113 of the 155 had at least 20 respondents and at least a 20 percent response rate. The questionnaire used twenty criteria in three main areas. The poll actually presents all twenty criteria to the reader. Eight criteria are based on alumni responses; eleven criteria are based on business school responses, and the final criterion is based on a research index produced by the Financial Times. The survey responses are audited by KPMG.

The Financial Times has also produced a "ranking of rankings" summarizing five of the individual rankings by The Economist, Bloomberg Businessweek, The Wall Street Journal, Forbes, and Financial Times, which produce U.S. and European summary rankings based on all five and a global summary ranking using The Wall Street Journal, Economist and Financial Times. The summary is based on underlying polls in which a school placed in the top ten using an average of the ordinal placements. The summary excludes the U.S. News & World Report results.

==== U.S. News & World Report ====
The U.S. News & World Report uses a combination of the objective and subjective as well. The magazine seeks "expert opinion about program quality and statistical indicators that measure the quality of a school's faculty, research, and students." However, it ranks a broad spectrum of professional school programs such as business schools, law schools, and medical schools as well as a variety of programs specific academic disciplines such as the social sciences or humanities. The business opinion data incorporates responses from deans, program directors, and senior faculty about the academic quality of their programs as well as the opinions of professionals who actually do the hiring of the new MBA graduates from the schools. The statistical data combines measures of the qualities of the incoming students and as well as the faculty with measures of post graduate success as related to their degrees. There were 382 programs that responded out of 402 solicited, and the formula used a strict combination of quality assessment (40%), placement success (35%), and student selectivity (25%).

==== Bloomberg ====
The Bloomberg Businessweek rankings, which are based on three sources of data (a student survey, a survey of corporate recruiters, and an intellectual capital rating), are published in mid-October of even numbered years. The 2006 student survey of 45 online questions of students' ratings of their programs was distributed to 16,595 students three weeks before graduation; there were 9,290 responses. The recruiter survey determines how many MBAs a recruiter's company hired in the previous two years and which schools it actively recruits from. 223 respondents participated out of 426 solicited. The intellectual capital is determined based on a formula incorporating academic publications in journals, books written, and faculty size.

==== Forbes Magazine ====
The Forbes magazine methodology was to calculate a five-year return on investment for 2002 graduates. Forbes surveyed 18,500 alumni of 102 MBA programs and used their pre-enrollment and post-graduate business school salary information as a basis for comparing post-MBA compensation with the cost of attending the programs.

QS MBA Ranking A British for-profit organization QS publishing The QS MBA and QS Executive MBA rankings have been used by Business Insider, a business magazine, in its ranking system, which is based on the popular rankings by Quacquarelli Symonds (QS).

=== Other ===
==== Aspen Institute ====
Rankings based on attributes other than standardized test scores, salary of graduates, and similar attributes also exist. The Beyond Grey Pinstripes ranking, compiled by the Aspen Institute and published biannually, is based entirely on the integration of social and environmental stewardship into university curriculum and faculty research. Data for this survey is solicited from university administrators at accredited colleges, and audited by teams of Ph.D. scoring fellows. Rankings are calculated on the amount of sustainability coursework made available to students (20%), amount of student exposure to relevant material (25%), amount of coursework focused on stewardship by for-profit corporations (30%), and relevant faculty research (25%). The 2011 survey and ranking include data from 150 universities.

== Criticism ==
The ranking of business schools has been discussed in articles and on academic websites. Critics of ranking methodologies maintain that any published rankings should be viewed with caution for the following reasons:

- Rankings exhibit intentional selection bias as they limit the surveyed population to a small number of MBA programs and ignore the majority of schools, many with excellent offerings.
- Ranking methods may be subject to personal biases and statistically flawed methodologies (especially methods relying on subjective interviews of hiring managers, students, and/or faculty).
- Rankings use no objective measures of program quality.
- The same list of schools appears in each ranking with some variation in ranks, so a school ranked as number 1 in one list may be number 17 in another list.
- Rankings tend to concentrate on representing MBA schools themselves, but some schools offer MBA programs of different qualities and yet the ranking will only rely upon information from the full-time program (e.g., a school may use highly reputable faculty to teach a daytime program, but use adjunct faculty in its evening program or have drastically lower admissions criteria for its evening program than for its daytime program).
- A high rank in a national publication tends to become a self-fulfilling prophecy.
- Some leading business schools including Harvard University, INSEAD, Wharton, and Sloan provide limited cooperation with certain ranking publications due to their perception that rankings are misused.

In the specific case of MBA programs, one study found that ranking MBA programs by a combination of graduates' starting salaries and average student GMAT score can duplicate some of the ranking order found in top 20 lists of Business Week and U.S. News & World Report.
