= Robert Iuliano =

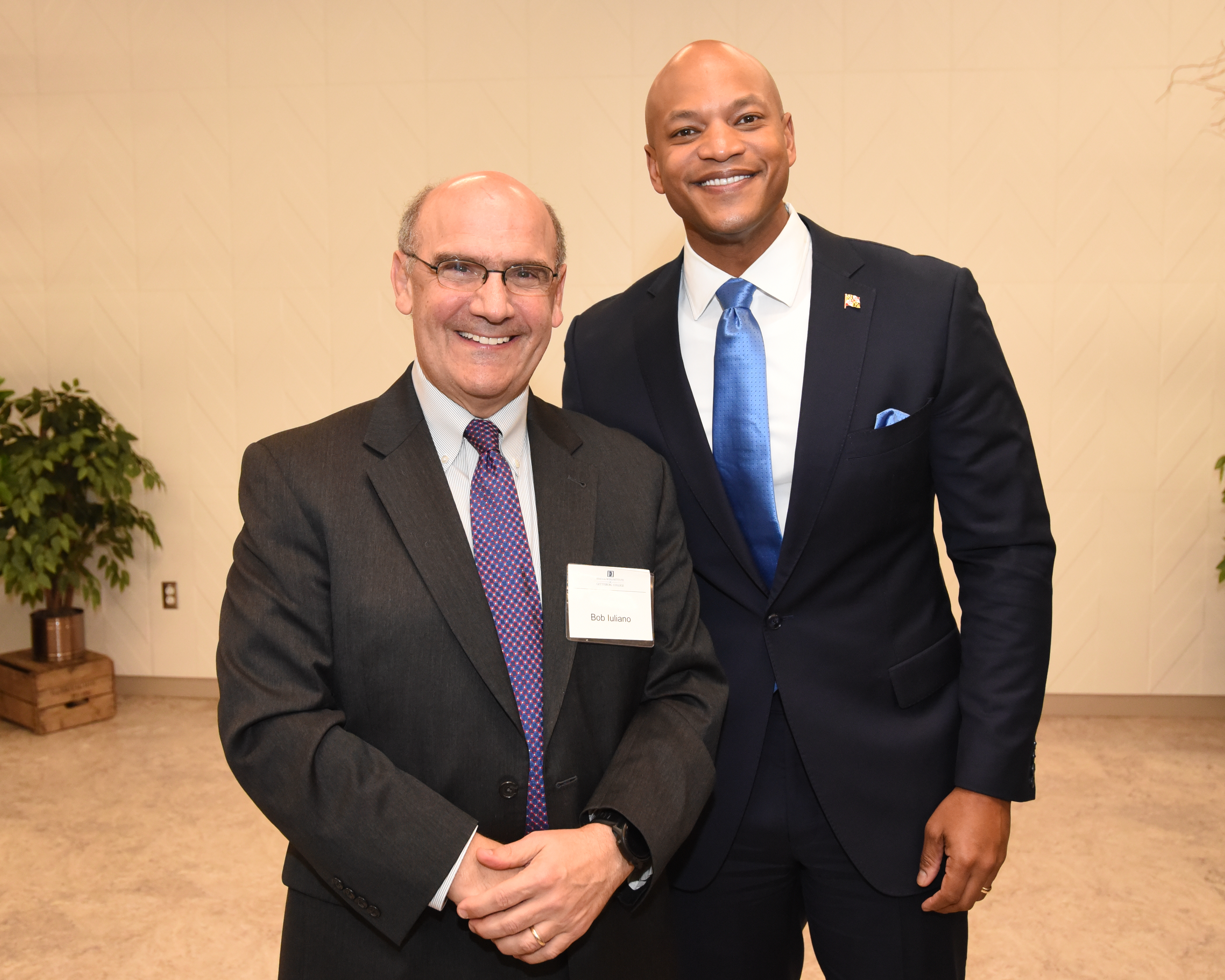
- Iuliano (left) with Maryland Governor Wes Moore in 2023

15th President of Gettysburg College
- Incumbent
- Assumed office July 1, 2019
- Preceded by: Janet Morgan Riggs

Personal details
- Born: Watertown, Massachusetts, U.S.
- Education: Harvard University (BA); University of Virginia (JD)

Robert W. Iuliano is an American attorney and academic administrator serving as the 15th president of Gettysburg College. Previously, he worked as the senior vice president, general counsel, and deputy to the president at Harvard University.

== Early life and education ==
Iuliano was born in Watertown, Massachusetts. He attended Harvard University and earned a Juris Doctor from the University of Virginia School of Law, where he served as editor-in-chief of the Virginia Law Review.

== Law career ==
Upon graduating law school, he held a judicial clerkship with Levin H. Campbell of the United States Court of Appeals for the First Circuit and served as an associate at the Boston law firm Choate, Hall & Stewart

He worked as a federal prosecutor in the U.S. Attorney's office in Boston before joining the counsel's office at Harvard University. As part of his responsibilities for the U.S. Attorney’s office, Iuliano investigated and prosecuted criminal violations of the federal drug, tax, fraud, money-laundering, and labor laws

== Harvard University ==
Iuliano served as senior vice president, general counsel, and deputy to the president at Harvard University from 1994 to 2019. A member of the University’s legal team, he served five presidents: Neil L. Rudenstine, Derek Bok, Lawrence H. Summers, Drew Gilpin Faust, and Lawrence S. Bacow.

In his role, Iuliano oversaw Harvard’s legal strategy, including Harvard’s response to the lawsuit challenging the College’s consideration of race in admissions.

During his career at Harvard, he oversaw the Harvard University Police Department and managed a number of University initiatives and committees, including efforts to strengthen Title IX regulations as well as the Presidential Task Force on Inclusion and Belonging

In addition to his administrative role at Harvard, Iuliano taught various seminar classes at the Harvard Graduate School of Education.

== Gettysburg College ==
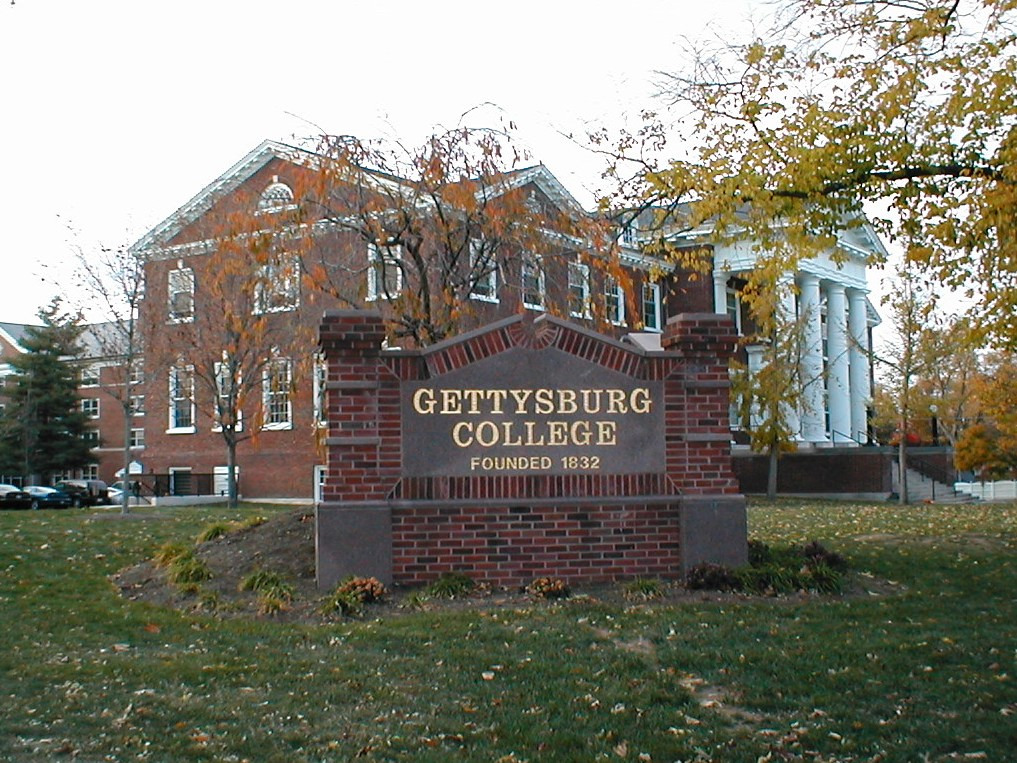
Gettysburg College, where Iuliano has served as president since 2019

In January 2019, Gettysburg College announced that Iuliano would succeed Janet Morgan Riggs to become the college's 15th president. He assumed office in July 2019.

Iuliano arrived at Gettysburg College just prior to COVID-19 pandemic in the United States. He spent much of his first three years navigating Gettysburg through the pandemic. He acknowledged the long-term effects the pandemic had on learning, but also emphasized the new and effective methods of instruction that came out of the challenges COVID-19 presented.

In response to the COVID-19 pandemic in Pennsylvania, Iuliano designated a one-week lockdown period for all students at Gettysburg College in September 2020. Iuliano also required all upperclassmen to return home for the fall semester, being the first American college to implement such a measure.

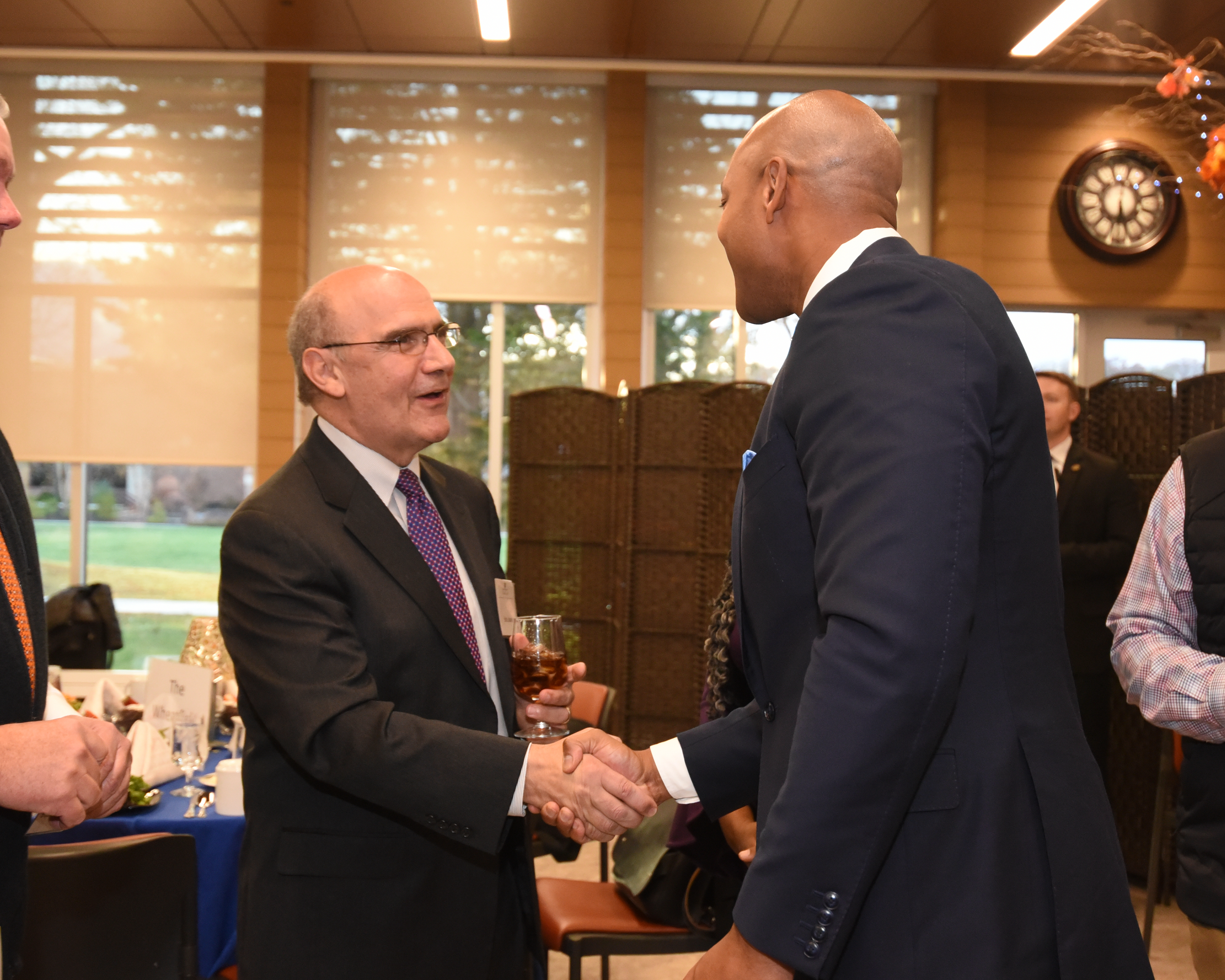
Iuliano shakes hands with Maryland Governor Wes Moore during the Eisenhower Institute's Speaker Series in 2023

In 2022, prior to the United States Supreme Court hearing oral arguments in Students for Fair Admissions v. Harvard, Iuliano spoke out on the importance of race-conscious admissions to building diverse college campuses. In an opinion editorial, Iuliano contended that a less diverse student body would undermine the impact and effectiveness of the education that American colleges offer to students, and that it would make college graduates less prepared to engage in an interconnected world.

Following the Supreme Court’s landmark ruling, Iuliano was critical of the decision that colleges and universities could no longer consider an applicant’s race when evaluating their application for admission.

In October, 2023, Iuliano's provost Jamila Bookwala announced the closure of The Gettysburg Review, a highly-regarded literary journal based at Gettysburg College. Faculty from the Gettysburg English Department, as well as students and alumni who had served as interns at the Review, and the wider literary community, spoke out against Iuliano's decision, questioning his commitment to equity and liberal-arts education.
