= Dale F. Nitzschke =

American academic (1937–2024)

President of Marshall University
- In office March 1, 1984 – August 1, 1990
- Preceded by: Sam Clagg (acting)
- Succeeded by: J. Wade Gilley

16th President of the University of New Hampshire
- In office August 1, 1990 – 1994
- Preceded by: Gordon Haaland
- Succeeded by: Joan Leitzel

President of Southeast Missouri State University
- In office July 1, 1996 – July 1, 1999
- Preceded by: Bill Atchley
- Succeeded by: Kenneth W. Dobbins

Personal details
- Born: Dale Frederick Nitzschke; September 16, 1937 Remsen, Iowa, U.S.
- Died: October 17, 2024 (aged 87)
- Spouse: Linda Hutchinson
- Education: Loras College (B.A.); Ohio University (M.Ed., Ph.D.)
- Occupation: Educator

Dale Frederick Nitzschke (September 16, 1937 – October 17, 2024) was an American academic. He was the president of the University of New Hampshire from 1990 to 1996, and of Marshall University from 1984 to 1990. He attended Loras College and Ohio University, and held B.A., M.Ed. and Ph.D. degrees. He taught at Ohio University, State University of College of Arts and Sciences at Plattsburgh, New York, the University of Northern Iowa, and University of Las Vegas.

Nitzschke died on October 17, 2024, at the age of 87.

== See also ==
- List of presidents and principals of Marshall University
