= Gordon A. Haaland =

American academic

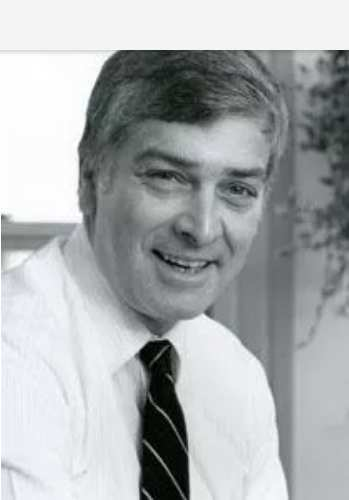

15th President of the University of New Hampshire
- In office 1984–1990
- Preceded by: Evelyn Handler
- Succeeded by: Dale F. Nitzschke

12th President of Gettysburg College
- In office 1990–2004
- Preceded by: Charles Etzweiler Glassick
- Succeeded by: Katherine Haley Will

Personal details
- Born: Gordon Arthur Haaland; April 19, 1940 Brooklyn, New York, U.S.
- Died: October 23, 2017 (aged 77) Richmond, Virginia, U.S.
- Spouse: Carol
- Children: two
- Education: State University of New York at Buffalo; Wheaton College
- Occupation: psychologist

Gordon Arthur Haaland (April 19, 1940 – October 23, 2017) was an American academic. He was the fifteenth President of the University of New Hampshire from 1984 to 1990, and of Gettysburg College from 1990 to 2004. He was an alumnus of Wheaton College and the State University of New York at Buffalo, earning a doctorate degree in social psychology at the latter.

in 1985, Haaland oversaw the establishment of the UNH Institute for the Study of Earth, Oceans, and Space, which dramatically increased research funding to the university.

University of New Hampshire built a residence hall named SERC Hall C In 2007, on October 11, 2013, this hall was renamed to Haaland Hall in his honor.

Gettysburg College built the quarry suites apartment complex in 1999, consisting of four separate apartment style dorms, and named Haaland Hall in his honor.
