= Evelyn Handler =

American academic administrator (1933–2011)

14th President of the University of New Hampshire
- In office 1980–1983
- Preceded by: Eugene S. Mills
- Succeeded by: Gordon A. Haaland

5th President of Brandeis University
- In office 1983–1991

Personal details
- Born: May 5, 1933 Budapest, Hungary
- Died: December 23, 2011 (aged 78) Bedford, New Hampshire, US

Evelyn Erika Handler (née Sass; May 5, 1933 – December 23, 2011) served from 1980 to 1983 as the University of New Hampshire's fourteenth, and first female, President. Handler was the first woman in the country to be named president of a publicly supported land grant university. She was credited with bringing in $15 million in federal grants for a science and engineering research center.

In 1983, Handler was inaugurated as President of Brandeis University, where she was also the first woman to hold that position. Notable achievements during her tenure include the initiation of The Volen National Center for Complex Systems, the strengthening of life sciences at Brandeis, admission to the Association of American Universities, and founding membership in the University Athletic Association. After leaving Brandeis in 1991, Handler was a research fellow and associate of the Graduate School of Education at Harvard University, and a senior fellow at The Carnegie Foundation for the Advancement of Teaching. From 1994 to 1997, she served as California Academy of Sciences' executive director and CEO.

Earlier in her career, she was Dean of Sciences and Mathematics, and professor of biological sciences at Hunter College, where she had earned her undergraduate degree. Dr. Handler earned M.Sc. and Ph.D. degrees from New York University, and a J.D. from Franklin Pierce Law Center. Her scholarly work includes many publications on myelogenous leukemia.

Handler was a fellow of the American Association for the Advancement of Science, and a fellow of the New York Academy of Sciences. Additionally, she was elected to the Board of Governors of the New York Academy of Sciences in 1979, and served as a director of the Student Loan Corporation (Stamford, CT). She held honorary degrees from the University of Pittsburgh, Rivier College and Hunter College. She was killed when as a pedestrian, she was struck by a motorist on December 23, 2011.

University of New Hampshire built a residence hall named SERC Hall A In 2007, on October 11, 2013, this hall was renamed to Handler Hall in her honor.
