= Gregory William Frux =

American artist (born 1958)

- Born: March 25, 1958 (age 68); Brooklyn, New York
- Education: Brooklyn Museum Art School; Art Students League; National Academy of Design
- Known for: Painting
- Movement: Realism

Gregory William Frux (born March 25, 1958) is a traditional realist artist, working mainly in the landscape genre. His oil paintings document both New York’s cityscapes and wilderness locations in North and South America.

== Life and career ==
Gregory Frux was born in Brooklyn, New York, on March 25, 1958. His father was an engineer and later school teacher who emigrated from Lvov, Poland in August 1939. His mother was grade school math teacher, who later taught adult literacy. It was through their teachings and examples that Frux developed his passion for art and native city. Gregory Frux married artist Janet Ellen Morgan in 1990.

Frux pursued art training at the Brooklyn Museum Art School, Art Students League and National Academy of Design where he studied with Harvey Dinnerstein while simultaneously earning a Bachelor of Architecture and subsequent license as an architect. From 1983 to 1989 Frux worked as an Architect for the New York City Board of Education (BOE) designing school additions and modernizations. In order to pursue his passion for art in public schools, in 1989 Frux moved to the newly created Public Art for Public Schools unit of the BOE, which is responsible for protection of 1500 works of art owned The City of New York. As a curator Frux catalogued, protected and helped conserved this significant collection from 1989 to 2006.

While working for the Board of Education, Frux completed his Master of Fine Arts from Brooklyn College in 1986, studying with noted realist Lennart Anderson. After coursework in Carrara, Italy, in 1984 he became increasingly dedicated to outdoor painting. Frux worked most often in Lower Manhattan; along the East River; and in Brooklyn’s Park Slope, Coney Island, and Gowanus Canal areas, painting on site in oils. Frux is deeply engaged with the layers of urban history seen in abandoned and repurposed buildings, industrial architecture, and the resurgence of nature along the harbor. His cityscapes have received recognition with exhibitions at Brooklyn Borough Hall, Brooklyn College, the Coney Island Museum, Long Island University, the Brooklyn Public Library's Central Library, The Tabla Rasa Gallery and a commission by the Metropolitan Transportation Authority.

Frux is deeply interested in the wilderness both aesthetically and as mountaineer. His climbing career has dovetailed with creative work in increasingly remote locations. Frux has served as artist in residence in four national park units: Weir Farm National Historic Site in Wilton, Connecticut; Glacier National Park; Joshua Tree National Park; Death Valley National Park, and Mount Washington Observatory. Frux was the first artist in residence at the Mount Washington Observatory, White Mountains New Hampshire and held an exhibit there after his residency. He has painted in the Rocky Mountains, Andes, Sierra Nevada, and Mojave Desert, including ‘portraits’ of significant peaks such as Cerro Fitzroy, Sajama and Lotus Flower Tower. This work have been included in the permanent collection of the National Park Service and exhibited by the American Alpine Club. In December 2007 Frux traveled as artist in residence aboard the cruise ship Orlova to the Antarctic Peninsula; his paintings of "Half Moon Bay, South Shetland Islands" have been published as a print. He worked as an artist aboard ship "Midnatsol" in Arctic Norway, November–December 2009.

== Publications ==
- 1999 - “Putting the glow on the Big Apple”
- 2000 - "NEIGHBORHOOD REPORT: PARK SLOPE; In Praise of Urban Landscape"
- 2004-05 - "Journey to the Lotus" and cover artist of Whole Terrain's volume on 'Risk'
- 2005 - “Death Valley National Park hosts visiting artists” Pahrump Valley Times
- In October 2010, Ann Japenga published an article about the work of Mr. Frux and his wife, Janet E. Morgan, titled, "Janet Morgan and Gregory Frux: Bringing Back Expedition Art".
- Contributing Writer for Professional Artist magazine (formerly published title "Art Calendar")

== Collections ==
=== Institutional Collections ===
- Death Valley National Park
- Joshua Tree National Park
- Glacier National Park
- MetroTech Center BID
- National Museum of Art of Kyrgyzstan
- New York City Department of Education
- Metropolitan Transportation Authority
- New York University—Fales Library and Special Collection
- Universal Diagnostic Laboratories
- United States Library of Congress
- American Mountaineering Museum
- Samuel Dorsky Museum of Art at the University of New York at New Paltz
- Mount Washington Observatory

=== Shown on loan ===
- United States Embassies in Madagascar and Ethiopia under the Federal Art in the Embassies Program
- From June 2, 2019 to June 15, 2019, Frux rented the Patrons' Gallery of the Salmagundi Club in New York City, displaying a collection of nature paintings titled "Gardens, Cliffs and Canyons"

=== Private Collections ===
- Maria Henle (estate) artist & master printmaker
- Nomi Silverman, artist & printmaker
- Kevin Burke, President & CEO of Con Edison
- Samuel Delany, Hugo Award winning science fiction author and scholar
- Steven Larsen, author of Shaman's Doorway, Center for Symbolic Studies
- Warrington Colescott, master printmaker
- Alex Grey, visionary artist
- Deborah Chaney, master printmaker
