= Eugene S. Mills =

American academic (1924–2020)

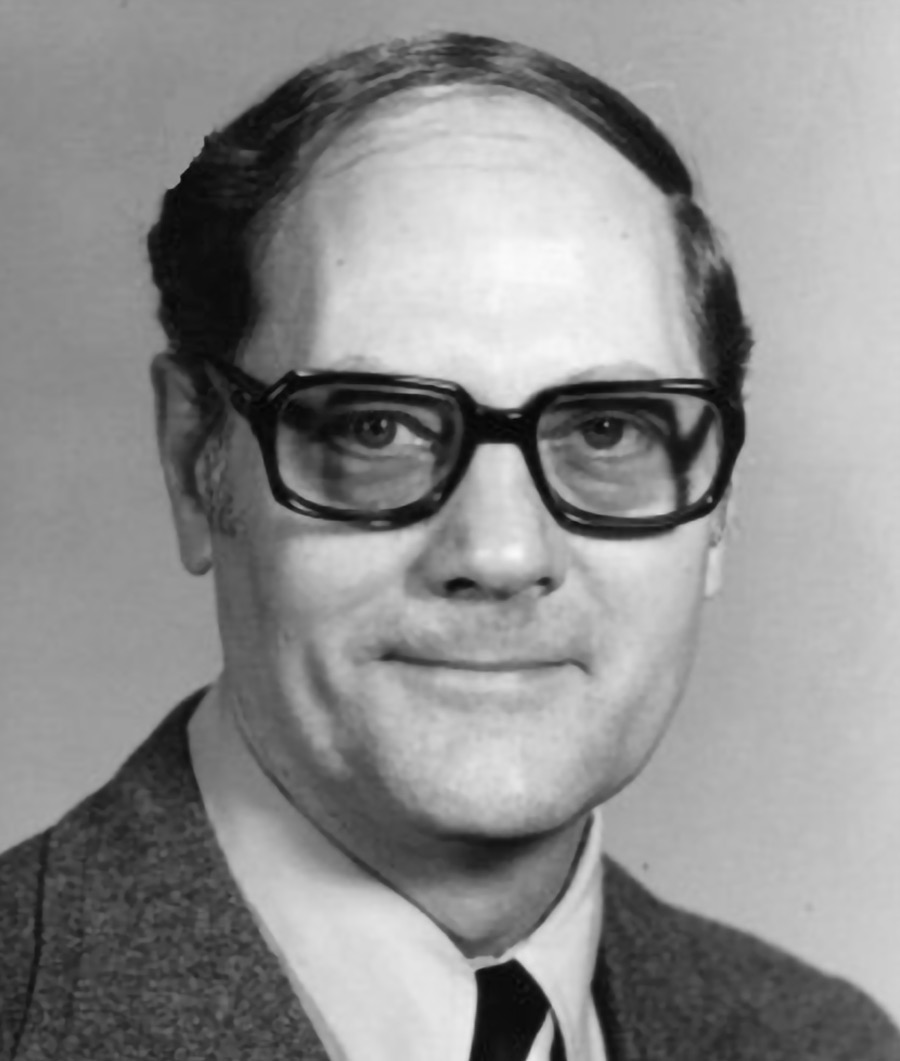

13th President of the University of New Hampshire
- In office 1974–1979
- Preceded by: Thomas N. Bonner
- Succeeded by: Evelyn Handler

President of Whittier College
- In office 1979–1989
- Preceded by: W. Roy Newsom
- Succeeded by: James L. Ash, Jr.

Personal details
- Born: September 13, 1924 West Newton, Indiana, U.S.
- Died: August 18, 2020 (aged 95) Durham, New Hampshire, U.S.
- Education: Earlham College; Claremont Graduate University
- Occupation: psychologist, author

Eugene Sumner Mills (September 13, 1924 – August 18, 2020) was an American academic. He was the thirteenth President of the University of New Hampshire from 1974 to 1979. Mills attended Earlham College and Claremont Graduate University, earning a Ph.D. in psychology at the latter. He taught at Whittier College before coming to the University of New Hampshire. Mills was a member of the UNH faculty for 17 years starting in 1962 as professor and chairman for the Department of Psychology, finishing up with his presidency. Mills then went on to serve as the president of Whittier College from 1979 to 1989, and interim president of Earlham College from 1996 to 1997.

He died in August 2020 at the age of 95 in Durham, New Hampshire.

The University of New Hampshire built a residence hall named Mills Hall in his honor, it was dedicated on November 7, 2002.

Mills was an early board member of Elderhostel, which became the Road Scholar program, a travel based education program.

== Selected works ==
The Story of Elderhostel
