= Janet Ellen Morgan =

American artist, author and curator

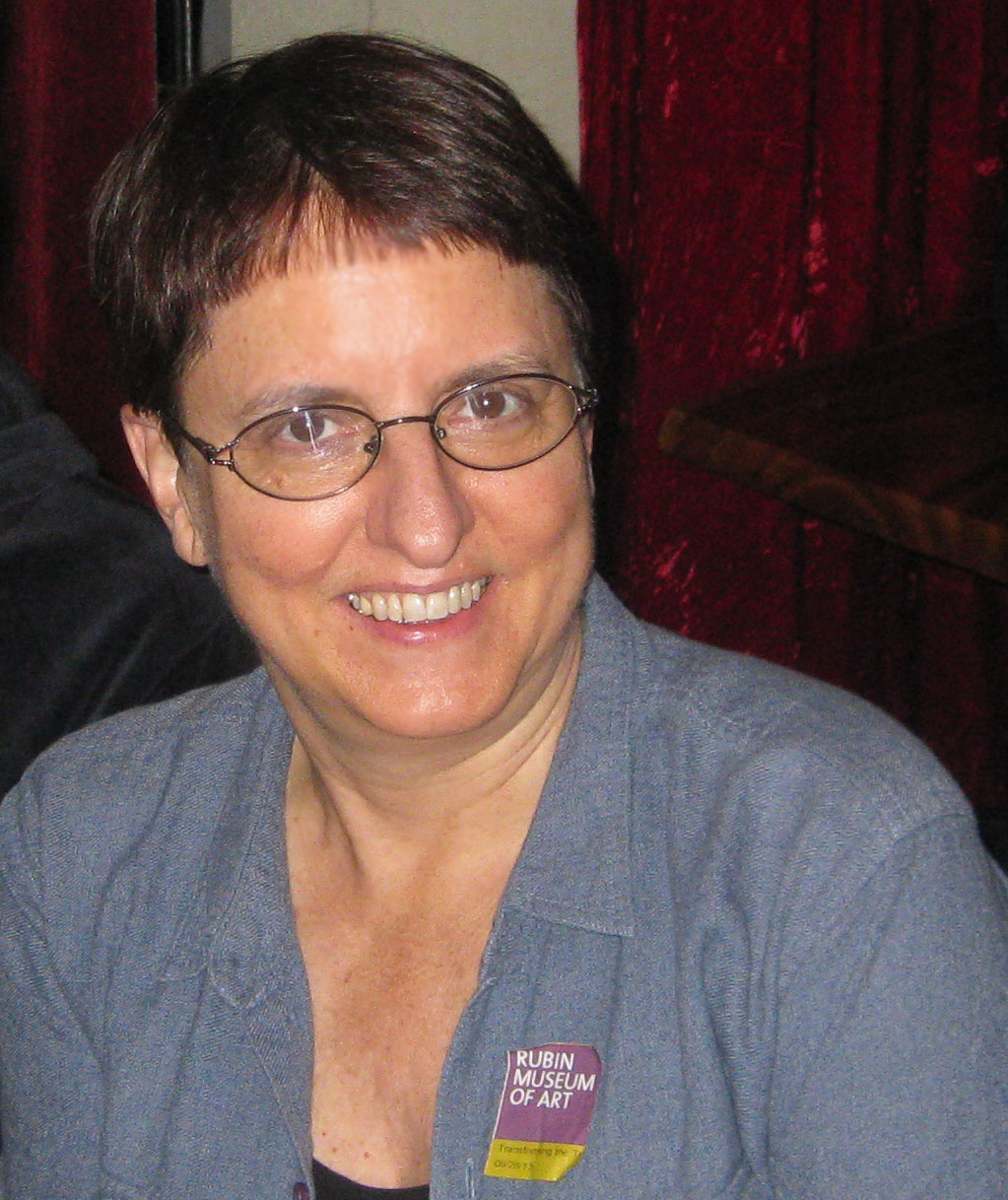
- Born: 1954 (age 71–72); Ann Arbor
- Known for: Visual arts; expeditionary art
- Spouse: Gregory William Frux (1990 - present)
- Website: http://janetmorgan-art.net

Janet Ellen Morgan is an American artist, author, teacher and curator noted for her landscapes and the creation of large-format deity portraits. Her work spans environmental education and public art. She is also the author and illustrator of children's books.

Morgan is a current member of the NY Artists Circle (NYAC).

== Education ==
Morgan received her BFA from the Minneapolis College of Art and Design and her MFA from the University of Wisconsin at Madison.

== Work ==
=== Sacred landscapes ===
Morgan creates watercolor and pastel landscapes based on fieldwork during expeditions to locations including Antarctica, Kyrgyzstan, Turkey, Bolivia, Peru, Patagonia, Death Valley, eastern Oregon, the Canadian Rockies, and southern Utah. She frequently travels and paints with her partner, the artist Gregory William Frux. Ann Japenga, writing in California Desert Art, described Morgan as "one of the boldest artists" working in the "same vein" of transcendant artist Agnes Pelton, capturing the "forces underlying desert mountains and dunes."

=== God and Goddess series ===
Morgan's God and Goddess series, which began in January 1990, consists of large-format 40 x 26 in watercolor portraits depicting a range of mythological and contemporary figures. Subjects in the series include traditional deities alongside modern conceptual figures such as The God of Safe Sex, The Bee Goddess, and The Goddess of the Joys of Petty Thievery.

=== Public art ===
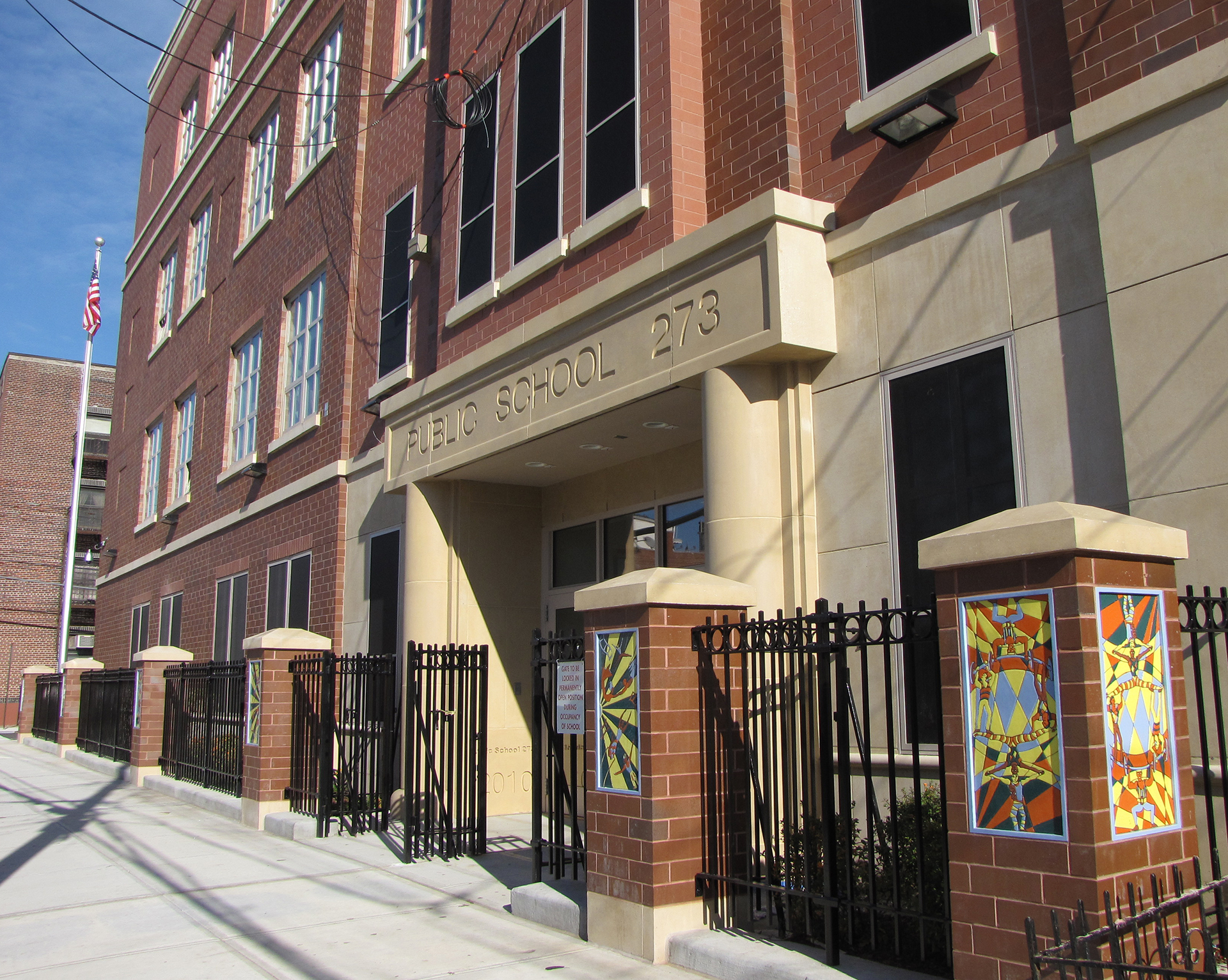
Public art installation for PS 273, commissioned by New York City Public Schools

In 2010, Morgan created a public art project for an early childhood center in Queens, New York, commissioned by New York City Public Schools. These designs were transformed into large terracotta tiles and installed in the stanchions of the school's fencing, alternating between right-side-up and upside-down orientations.

=== Residencies ===
Morgan has done a number of artistic and teaching residencies. Among the residencies are Death Valley National Park,, the Luminous Bodies Residency in Toronto., and Hanksville Elementary School in Utah.

=== Curation ===
Morgan has curated and co-curated exhibitions at the Brooklyn Waterfront Artists Coalition (BWAC) and Artfront Galleries in Newark, New Jersey. In 2024, she co-curated Salon des Refuses at BWAC, an exhibition of works rejected from the Brooklyn Museum's open-call show, which drew more than 200 submissions and was reviewed in Hyperallergic and The New York Times. Also in 2024, she curated Fearless Watercolor, Acquarelas con Cojones, a national juried show at BWAC. Morgan co-curated Biophilia: The Love of Nature, a national open call at BWAC, with ceramicist Sandy Forrest. In 2026, she co-curated the member exhibition New Beginnings at BWAC with Renee Radenberg.

Morgan is a board member and curator at Artfront Galleries in Newark, New Jersey, where she has curated exhibitions including Femme Fatale and The Divine Feminist. She also co-curated Blended Beings with Susanna Plotnick and Mirror Mirror with Susan O'Rourke at the gallery. In 2018, she co-curated Urban Evidence 3.0 at the Waterfront Recreation Center in New Jersey.

== Books and Exhibition Catalogs ==
Morgan has authored and illustrated two children's books:

- Welcome to Death Valley! (2012)
- The award winning Coney Island Awakes (2022)

She has also illustrated more than fourteen books, including:

- The Sea & Ourselves at Cape Ann by Lawrence Ferlinghetti (1979)
- Metamorphoses by Sheryl St. Germain (2020)
- What Art Can Do: A Conversation with Janet Morgan by Heather Sanderson (2025)

Further contributions include:

Morgan has created exhibition catalogs for a number of shows including:

- Quintessence Three Visions for the Omega Institute (2014) in Rhinebeck, New York. In the introduction to this catalog, author Kim Stanley Robinson praised Morgan's work, stating:

"Morgan’s images display our own felt electricity, the crackling auras and fields that we know for sure are there, not just from new scientific sensors, but from the way our bodies so often feel. We are not only stardust, but wild patterned energy, dust devils swirling through space for just a time".

Exhibition Catalogs including Morgans work include:

- Crossed Destinies: A Tarot of the Artists: Creative Adventures Through the Major Arcana (2005) by Williamsburg Art Center
- Music to My Eyes (2006) and Sanctuary (2016) by Tabla Rasa Gallery

The book What Art Can Do: A Conversation with Janet Morgan by Heather Sanderson has been reviewed by Ann Japenga.

== Teaching ==
Morgan has taught at the Art Students League of New York, the Rubin Museum of Art, and the Omega Institute and Death Valley National Park. She also worked as an Expressive Arts Therapist with adult cancer patients at Memorial Sloan Kettering for 18 years.
