= Janet Morgan Riggs =

American psychologist and academic administrator

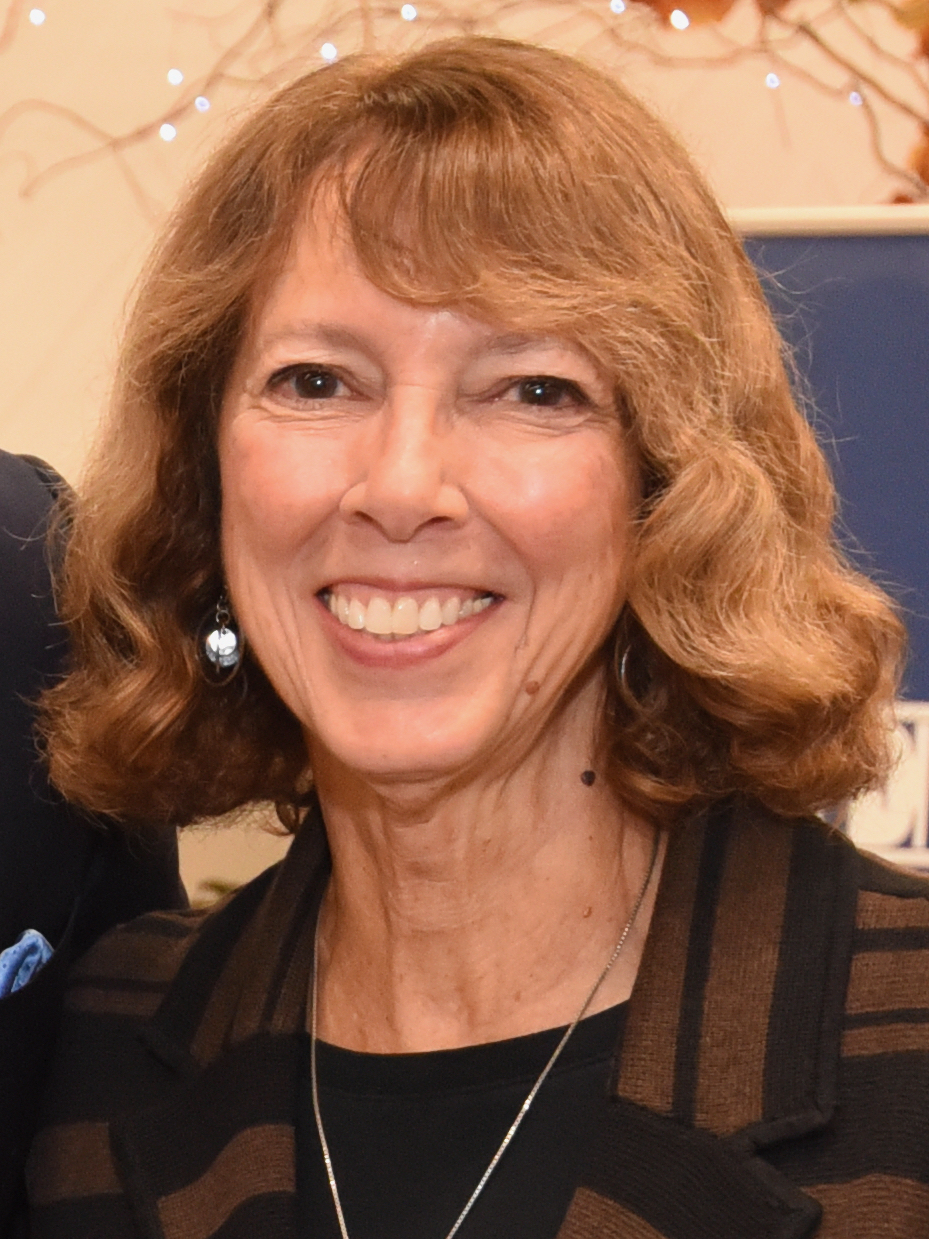
- Riggs in 2023

14th President of Gettysburg College
- In office 2009–2019
- Preceded by: Katherine Haley Will
- Succeeded by: Robert Iuliano

Personal details
- Born: c. 1955 (age 70–71)
- Spouse: Ed Riggs
- Education: Gettysburg College (BA); Princeton University (MA, PhD)
- Profession: Professor

Janet Morgan Riggs (born c. 1955) is an American psychologist and academic administrator. She served as the 14th President of Gettysburg College from 2009 to 2019. Riggs, a member of the Gettysburg College class of 1977, has held several positions at the college, including professor of psychology, interim provost, provost, executive assistant to the president, and interim president.

== Education ==
While at Gettysburg College, Riggs became a sister of Chi Omega. She completed a double major in mathematics and psychology because she thought the heavy emphasis on statistics would help her get into graduate school. She worked as a research assistant for the psychology department during the summer and did independent study in her senior year. In 1977, she received her Bachelor of Arts degree, graduating summa cum laude. Riggs met her eventual husband, Ed Riggs, at Gettysburg College during her freshman year, 1973.

Riggs graduated from Princeton University with an M.A. and Ph.D. in social psychology. In her final year at Princeton, Riggs was actively pursued by Gettysburg College to take a one-year position in the psychology department.

== Career ==
After receiving her degrees from Princeton, Riggs accepted a position at Gettysburg College as an instructor of psychology. She was promoted to the position of professor of psychology and eventually served as chair of the psychology department. During her time in the psychology department, Riggs taught courses on experimental methods, social psychology, and general psychology. Her research has included expectancy confirmation, gender role stereotypes, and attributions for behavior. She has published several articles on this research and currently serves as a consulting editor for the Psychology of Women Quarterly.

From 1991 to 1994, Riggs served as executive assistant to the president under President Gordon Haaland. In 1995, she served a one-year term as interim provost. She returned to this position in 2006, and was named provost the following year.

In March 2008, following the resignation of President Katherine Haley Will, Riggs accepted the position of interim president. In February 2009, following an extensive national search, Riggs was named the college’s 14th president. She has served the college for 27 years in 2009.

Riggs has been awarded the Gettysburg College Student Senate Faculty Appreciation Award, the Thompson Award for Distinguished Teaching, and the Gettysburg College Woman of Distinction Award.

She was the main speaker for the 2018 Dedication Day ceremonies in Gettysburg on November 19, 2018.

Riggs retired on July 1, 2019. Bob Iuliano, former Executive Vice President, General Counsel, and Deputy to the President of Harvard University, succeeded her as President of Gettysburg College.

== Personal life ==
Riggs is a native of suburban Philadelphia. She lives with her husband Ed, who also graduated from Gettysburg College in 1977, in a residence adjacent to the Gettysburg campus. Riggs and her husband, who is a retired teacher, have three grown children.

== Publications ==
- THE EFFECT OF PERFORMANCE ATTRIBUTIONS ON CHOICE OF ACHIEVEMENT STRATEGY, 1982
- Mandates for mothers and fathers : perceptions of breadwinners and care givers, 1997
- Social roles we choose and don't choose : impressions of employed and unemployed parents, 1998

== See also ==
- Gettysburg College
- Gettysburg, Pennsylvania

Academic offices
Preceded by Katherine Haley Will	President of Gettysburg College; 2009–2019; Interim President: 2008-2009	Succeeded by Bob Iuliano
