= Liberal arts colleges in the United States =

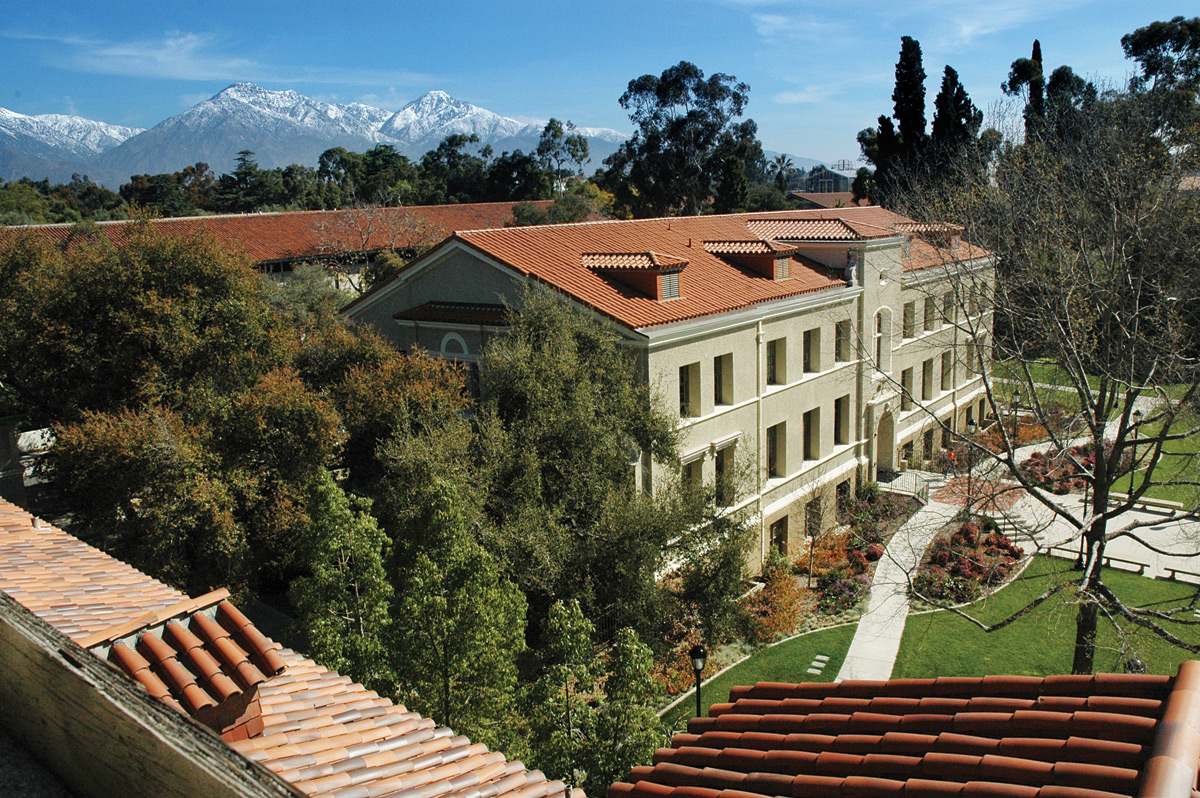
Pomona College, a liberal arts college in Claremont, California

Liberal arts colleges in the United States are undergraduate institutions of higher education in the United States that focus on a liberal arts education. The Encyclopædia Britannica Concise defines liberal arts as a "college or university curriculum aimed at imparting general knowledge and developing general intellectual capacities, in contrast to a professional, vocational, or technical curriculum". Generally, a full-time, four-year course of study at a liberal arts college leads students to earning the Bachelor of Arts or the Bachelor of Science.

These schools are American institutions of higher education which have traditionally emphasized interactive instruction (although research is still a component of these institutions) at the undergraduate level. While there is no nationwide legal standard in the United States, the term "university" is primarily used to designate graduate education and research institutions, and is reserved for doctorate-granting institutions, and some US states, such as Massachusetts, will only grant a school "university status" if it offers graduate programs in multiple disciplines.

These colleges also encourage a high level of student-teacher interaction at the center of which are classes taught by full-time faculty. They are known for being residential and may have smaller enrollment, class sizes, and student-teacher ratios than universities.

== Consortia and groups ==
Liberal arts colleges are also often associated with larger bodies or consortia. The largest association of private liberal arts colleges in the United States is the Council of Independent Colleges, with more than 650 small and mid-sized independent colleges and universities. The Council of Public Liberal Arts Colleges is a consortium of public liberal arts colleges. Many liberal arts colleges belong to the Annapolis Group, Oberlin Group, Women's College Coalition, and the Consortium of Liberal Arts Colleges. A number of liberal arts colleges are involved in Project Pericles or the Eco League.

Other well-known consortia in the Eastern United States include the Little Three, Colby-Bates-Bowdoin Consortium, the Seven Sisters Colleges, and the Little Ivies. Four Eastern colleges, along with the University of Massachusetts Amherst, are also part of the Five Colleges Consortium in Western Massachusetts and three Eastern colleges comprise the Tri-College Consortium.

In Southern California, five liberal arts colleges with adjoining campuses and two graduate schools together form the Claremont Colleges.

Consortia in the Midwestern United States include the Associated Colleges of the Midwest, Five Colleges of Ohio, Associated Colleges of the Twin Cities, and the Great Lakes Colleges Association.

Groups in the Southern United States include the Associated Colleges of the South and the Seven Sisters of the South.

== Purpose and goals ==
Chapter One of Howard Greene and Matthew Greene's Hidden Ivies: Thirty Colleges of Excellence, "The Liberal Arts: What is a Liberal Arts Education and Why is it Important Today", defines the goals of a liberal arts education in the following manner:

In a complex, shifting world, it is essential to develop a high degree of intellectual literacy and critical-thinking skills, a sense of moral and ethical responsibility to one's community, the ability to reason clearly, to think rationally, to analyze information intelligently, to respond to people in a compassionate and fair way, to continue learning new information and concepts over a lifetime, to appreciate and gain pleasure from the beauty of the arts and literature and to use these as an inspiration and a solace when needed, to revert to our historical past for lessons that will help shape the future intelligently and avoid unnecessary mistakes, to create a sense of self-esteem that comes from personal accomplishments and challenges met with success.

College placement counselor Loren Pope writes that at the liberal arts colleges he lists in Colleges That Change Lives:

The focus is on the student, not the faculty; he is heavily involved in his own education. There are no passive ears; students and faculty work so closely together, they even coauthor publications. Teaching is an act of love. There is not only a mentor relationship in class but professors become hiking companions, intramural teammates, dinner companions, and friends. Learning is collaborative rather than competitive; values are central; there is a strong sense of community. They are places of great synergy, where the whole becomes greater than the sum of the parts. Aspirations are raised, young people are empowered.

== Rankings ==
College and university rankings guides offer annual issues that rank liberal arts colleges separately from research universities. The Washington Monthly and U.S. News & World Report provide rankings specifically of liberal arts colleges.

=== 2007 movement ===
On June 19, 2007, during the annual meeting of the Annapolis Group, members discussed the letter to college presidents asking them not to participate in the "reputation survey" section of the U.S. News & World Report survey (this section comprises 25% of the ranking). As a result, "a majority of the approximately 80 presidents at the meeting said that they did not intend to participate in the U.S. News reputational rankings in the future." The decision to fill out the reputational survey or not will be left up to each individual college since "the Annapolis Group is not a legislative body and any decision about participating in the US News rankings rests with the individual institutions." The statement also said that its members "have agreed to participate in the development of an alternative common format that presents information about their colleges for students and their families to use in the college search process". This database will be web based and developed in conjunction with higher education organizations including the National Association of Independent Colleges and Universities and the Council of Independent Colleges.

On June 22, 2007, U.S. News & World Report editor Robert Morse responded, writing, "in terms of the peer assessment survey, we at U.S. News firmly believe the survey has significant value because it allows us to measure the "intangibles" of a college that we can't measure through statistical data. Plus, the reputation of a school can help get that all-important first job and plays a key part in which grad school someone will be able to get into. The peer survey is by nature subjective, but the technique of asking industry leaders to rate their competitors is a commonly accepted practice. The results from the peer survey also can act to level the playing field between private and public colleges." In reference to the alternative database discussed by the Annapolis Group, Morse also argued, "It's important to point out that the Annapolis Group's stated goal of presenting college data in a common format has been tried before ... U.S. News has been supplying this exact college information for many years already. And it appears that NAICU will be doing it with significantly less comparability and functionality. U.S. News first collects all these data (using an agreed-upon set of definitions from the Common Data Set). Then we post the data on our website in easily accessible, comparable tables. In other words, the Annapolis Group and the others in the NAICU initiative actually are following the lead of U.S. News."

== SAT optional movement ==
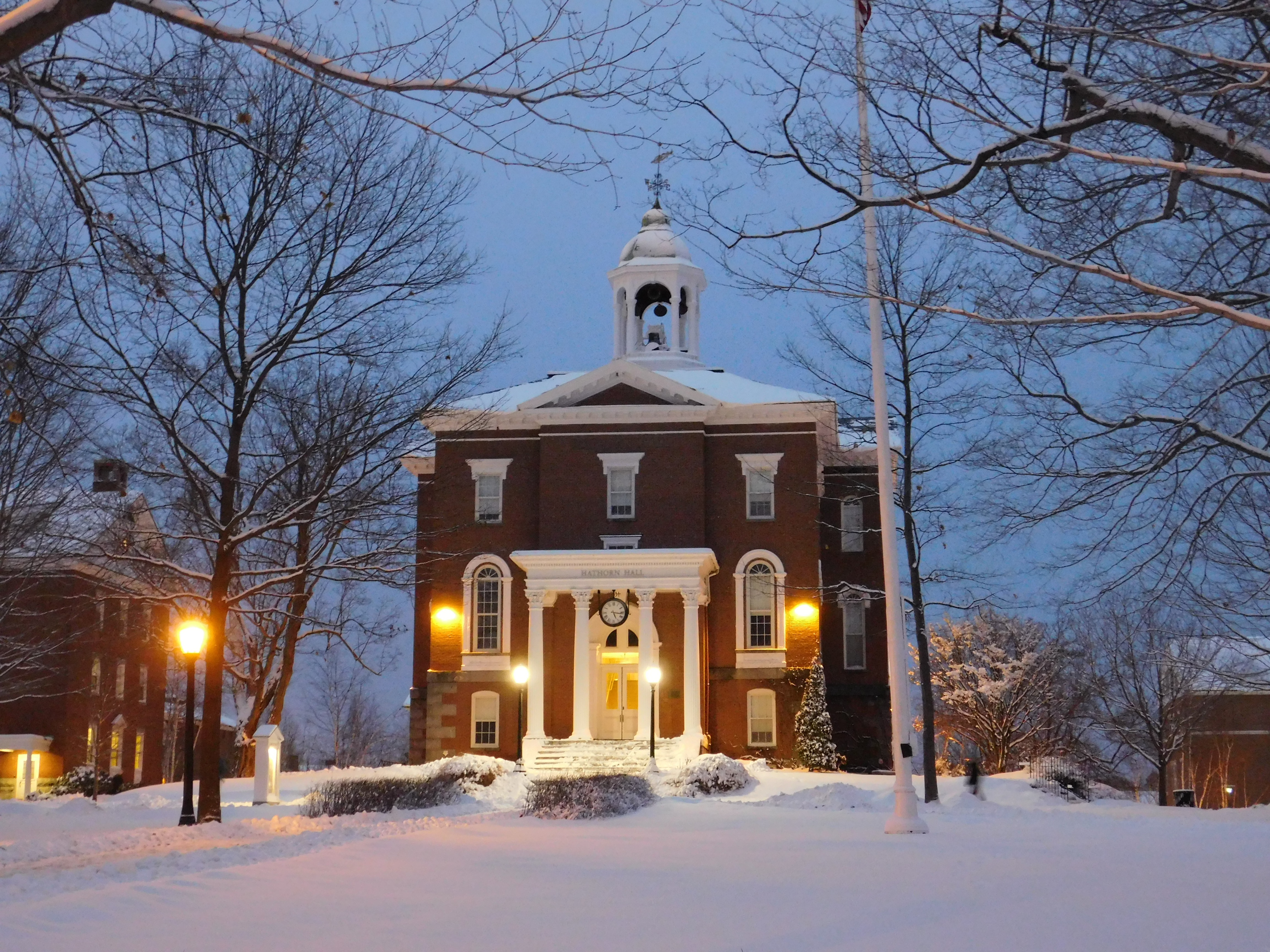
Bates College, the first coeducational liberal arts college in New England, and one of the first to dismiss the ACT/SAT requirement

Sarah Lawrence College dismissed their standardized test scores requirements in the early 2000s.

A number of U.S. liberal arts colleges have either joined, or have been important influences on, a movement to make the SAT optional for admission, in response to criticisms of the SAT.

Bowdoin College in Brunswick, Maine and Bates College in Lewiston, Maine were among the first to institute SAT-optional programs in 1969 and 1984, respectively. In 1990, the Bates faculty voted to make all standardized testing optional in the college's admissions process, and in October 2004 Bates published a study regarding the testing optional policy, which was presented to the National Association for College Admission Counseling. Following two decades without required testing, the college found that the difference in graduation rates between submitters and non-submitters was 0.1%, that Bates' applicant pool had doubled since the policy was instated with approximately 1/3 of applicants not submitting scores, that non-submitting students averaged only 0.05 points lower on their collegiate Grade Point Average, and that applications from minority students rose dramatically.

The Bates College study prompted a movement among small liberal arts colleges to make the SAT optional for admission to college in the early 2000s. Indeed, according to a 31 August 2006 article in The New York Times, "It is still far too early to sound the death knell, but for many small liberal arts colleges, the SAT may have outlived its usefulness."

Sarah Lawrence College and Pitzer College dropped their SAT test score submission requirement for their undergraduate applicants in 2003 and 2004 respectively, thus joining the SAT optional movement for undergraduate admission. The former president of Sarah Lawrence, Michele Tolela Myers, described the rationale for this decision in an article for The Washington Post on 11 March 2007, saying: "We are a writing-intensive school, and the information produced by SAT scores added little to our ability to predict how a student would do at our college; it did, however, do much to bias admission in favor of those who could afford expensive coaching sessions." As a result of this policy, in the same Washington Post article, Myers stated that she was informed by the U.S. News & World Report that if no SAT scores were submitted, U.S. News would "make up a number" to use in its magazines. She further argues that if SLC were to decide to stop sending all data to U.S. News & World Report, their ranking would be artificially decreased. U.S. News issued a response to this article on 12 March 2007 that stated that the evaluation of Sarah Lawrence is under review.

As of 2007, according to U.S. News & World Report, Sarah Lawrence was the only "major" American college that completely disregarded SAT scores in its admission process. Currently Sarah Lawrence accepts SAT scores, but submitting these scores remains optional. Other liberal arts colleges that have since begun to no longer consider the SAT include Shimer College and Hampshire College, which is "test blind" in both admissions and financial aid decisions.

The full list of SAT optional schools is given by FairTest, an American educational organization that "advances quality education and equal opportunity by promoting fair, open, valid and educationally beneficial evaluations of students, teachers and schools. FairTest also works to end the misuses and flaws of testing practices that impede those goals."

== Oldest American liberal arts colleges ==
University	Date founded	Founded by	Founding religion	Ref.
St. John's College	1696/1783	Absorbed King William's School, which was founded by members of St. Anne's Parish in 1696. Closed from 1861 to 1865. New curriculum and administration and almost completely new faculty in 1936.	Episcopalian	
Washington College	1723	William Smith	Episcopalian	
Moravian College	1742	Benigna, Countess von Zinzendorf	Moravian	
Washington and Lee University	1749	In 1749, Scotch-Irish pioneers who had migrated deep into the Valley of Virginia founded a small classical school called Augusta Academy, some 20 miles north of what is now Lexington.	Presbyterian	
Salem College	1772	Moravians	Moravian	
Dickinson College	1773	Pennsylvania General Assembly	Non-denominational	
Hampden-Sydney College	1775	Samuel Stanhope Smith	Presbyterian	
Transylvania University	1780	Thomas Jefferson & Virginia Legislature	Episcopalian	
Washington & Jefferson College	1781	John McMillan, Thaddeus Dod, & Joseph Smith	Presbyterian	
Franklin & Marshall College	1787	Lutheran Ministers	Lutheranism	
Hamilton College	1793	Samuel Kirkland	Presbyterian (informally)	
Williams College	1793	Ephraim Williams	Congregationalist	
Bowdoin College	1794	Massachusetts State Legislature	Congregationalist	
Union College	1795	Board of Regents of the University of the State of New York	Non-denominational	
Hartwick College	1797	John Christopher Hartwick	Lutheranism	
Middlebury College	1800	Jeremiah Atwater	Congregationalist	

== See also ==
- General Studies
- Creative arts
