= Annapolis Group =

Organization of American liberal arts colleges

- Founded: 1993; 33 years ago
- Tax ID no.: 82-2828643
- Legal status: 501(c)(3)
- Headquarters: Annapolis, Maryland, U.S.
- Chair: Jonathan Green
- Website: annapolisgroup.org

The Annapolis Group of Liberal Arts Colleges Inc (also known simply as the Annapolis Group) is an American 501(c)(3) organization of independent liberal arts colleges. It represents approximately 130 liberal arts colleges in the United States. These colleges work together to promote a greater understanding of the goals of a liberal arts education through their websites, as well as through independent research. Its current chair is Jonathan Green of Susquehanna University.

== Background ==
The Annapolis Group was first organized in early 1993 in Annapolis, Maryland. Its original members included and expanded upon the Oberlin Group which was first organized in 1984. The Annapolis Group was created by the presidents of Franklin & Marshall College, Gettysburg College, Beloit College and Dickinson College. The group is made up of private colleges and universities, many of which have current or historic ties to mainline Protestant denominations or to Catholic religious orders.

== Member institutions ==
Institution	Religious affiliation	Location	Region
Albright College	Methodist (UMC)	Reading, Pennsylvania	Northeast
Allegheny College	Methodist (UMC)	Meadville, Pennsylvania	Northeast
Amherst College	None	Amherst, Massachusetts	Northeast
Bard College	Episcopalian	Annandale-on-Hudson, New York	Northeast
Bates College	None	Lewiston, Maine	Northeast
Bennington College	None	Bennington, Vermont	Northeast
Bowdoin College	None	Brunswick, Maine	Northeast
Bryn Mawr College	None (formerly Quaker)	Bryn Mawr, Pennsylvania	Northeast
Bucknell University	None (formerly Baptist)	Lewisburg, Pennsylvania	Northeast
Colby College	None	Waterville, Maine	Northeast
Colgate University	None (formerly Baptist)	Hamilton Villiage, New York	Northeast
College of the Atlantic	None	Bar Harbor, Maine	Northeast
College of the Holy Cross	Catholic (Jesuit)	Worcester, Massachusetts	Northeast
Connecticut College	None	New London, Connecticut	Northeast
Dickinson College	None	Carlisle, Pennsylvania	Northeast
Drew University	Methodist (UMC)	Madison, New Jersey	Northeast
Emmanuel College	Catholic (SNDdeN)	Boston, Massachusetts	Northeast
Franklin and Marshall College	None (formerly Reformed)	Lancaster, Pennsylvania	Northeast
Gettysburg College	Lutheran (ELCA)	Gettysburg, Pennsylvania	Northeast
Gordon College	Non-denominational Christian	Wenham, Massachusetts	Northeast
Goucher College	None (formerly Methodist)	Towson, Maryland	Northeast
Hamilton College	None	Clinton, New York	Northeast
Haverford College	None (formerly Quaker)	Haverford, Pennsylvania	Northeast
Hobart and William Smith Colleges	None	Geneva, New York	Northeast
Juniata College	None (formerly Anabaptist)	Huntingdon, Pennsylvania	Northeast
Lafayette College	None (formerly Presbyterian)	Easton, Pennsylvania	Northeast
Lycoming College	Methodist (UMC)	Williamsport, Pennsylvania	Northeast
Manhattan University	Catholic (Lasallian)	New York City, New York	Northeast
McDaniel College	None (formerly Methodist)	Westminster, Maryland	Northeast
Moravian University	Moravian	Bethlehem, Pennsylvania	Northeast
Mount Holyoke College	None	South Hadley, Massachusetts	Northeast
Muhlenberg College	Lutheran (ELCA)	Allentown, Pennsylvania	Northeast
Sarah Lawrence College	None	Yonkers, New York	Northeast
Skidmore College	None	Saratoga Springs, New York	Northeast
Smith College	None	Northampton, Massachusetts	Northeast
St. John's College	None	Annapolis, Maryland; Santa Fe, New Mexico	Northeast
St. Lawrence University	None (formerly Universalist)	Canton, New York	Northeast
Susquehanna University	Lutheran (ELCA)	Susquehanna, Pennsylvania	Northeast
Swarthmore College	None (formerly Quaker)	Swarthmore, Pennsylvania	Northeast
Trinity College	None (formerly Episcopalian)	Hartford, Connecticut	Northeast
Union College	None	Schenectady, New York	Northeast
Ursinus College	None (formerly Reformed)	Collegeville, Pennsylvania	Northeast
Vassar College	None	Poughkeepsie, New York	Northeast
Washington College	None	Chestertown, Maryland	Northeast
Washington & Jefferson College	None (formerly Presbyterian)	Washington, Pennsylvania	Northeast
Wellesley College	None	Wellesley, Massachusetts	Northeast
Wesleyan University	None (formerly Methodist)	Middletown, Connecticut	Northeast
Williams College	None	Williamstown, Massachusetts	Northeast
Albion College	None (formerly Methodist)	Albion, Michigan	Midwest
Alma College	Presbyterian (PCUSA)	Alma, Michigan	Midwest
Augustana College	Lutheran (ELCA)	Rock Island, Illinois	Midwest
Beloit College	None (formerly Congregational)	Beloit, Wisconsin	Midwest
Carleton College	None (formerly Congregational)	Northfield, Minnesota	Midwest
Carthage College	Lutheran (ELCA)	Kenosha, Wisconsin	Midwest
Coe College	Presbyterian (PCUSA)	Cedar Rapids, Iowa	Midwest
College of Saint Benedict and Saint John's University	Catholic (Benedictine)	St. Joseph, Minnesota	Midwest
College of Wooster	None (formerly Presbyterian)	Wooster, Ohio	Midwest
Colorado College	None (formerly Presbyterian)	Colorado Springs, Colorado	Midwest
Concordia College	Lutheran (ELCA)	Moorhead, Minnesota	Midwest
Cornell College	Methodist (UMC)	Mount Vernon, Iowa	Midwest
Denison University	None (formerly Baptist)	Granville, Ohio	Midwest
DePauw University	None (formerly Methodist)	Greencastle, Indiana	Midwest
Earlham College	Quakers	Richmond, Indiana	Midwest
Grinnell College	None (formerly Congregational)	Grinnell, Iowa	Midwest
Gustavus Adolphus College	Lutheran (ELCA)	St. Peter, Minnesota	Midwest
Hiram College	None (formerly Disciples of Christ)	Hiram, Ohio	Midwest
Hope College	Reformed (RCA)	Holland, Michigan	Midwest
Illinois Wesleyan University	None (formerly Methodist)	Bloomington, Illinois	Midwest
Kalamazoo College	None (formerly Baptist)	Kalamazoo, Michigan	Midwest
Kenyon College	None (formerly Episcopalian)	Gambier, Ohio	Midwest
Knox College	None (formerly Calvinist)	Galesburg, Illinois	Midwest
Lake Forest College	None (formerly Presbyterian)	Lake Forest, Illinois	Midwest
Lawrence University	None (formerly Universalist)	Appleton, Wisconsin	Midwest
Luther College	Lutheran (ELCA)	Decorah, Iowa	Midwest
Macalester College	None	Saint Paul, Minnesota	Midwest
Monmouth College	Presbyterian (PCUSA)	Monmouth, Illinois	Midwest
Nebraska Wesleyan University	Methodist (UMC)	Lincoln, Nebraska	Midwest
Oberlin College	None	Oberlin, Ohio	Midwest
Ohio Wesleyan University	Methodist (UMC)	Delaware, Ohio	Midwest
St. Olaf College	Lutheran (ELCA)	Northfield, Minnesota	Midwest
Saint Mary's College	Catholic (CSC)	Notre Dame, Indiana	Midwest
St. Norbert College	Catholic (Norbertine)	De Pere, Wisconsin	Midwest
Wabash College	None	Crawfordsville, Indiana	Midwest
Wittenberg University	Lutheran (ELCA)	Springfield, Ohio	Midwest
Agnes Scott College	Presbyterian (PCUSA)	Decartur, Georgia	South
Austin College	Presbyterian (PCUSA)	Sherman, Texas	South
Berea College	Christianity	Berea, Kentucky	South
Berry College	Non-denominational Christian	Rome, Georgia	South
Centre College	Presbyterian (PCUSA)	Danville, Kentucky	South
Davidson College	Presbyterian (PCUSA)	Davidson, North Carolina	South
Eckerd College	Presbyterian (PCUSA)	St. Petersburg, Florida	South
Furman University	None (historically Baptist)	Greenville, South Carolina	South
Guilford College	None (formerly Quaker)	Greensboro, North Carolina	South
Hampden–Sydney College	Presbyterian (PCUSA)	Hampden Sydney, Virginia	South
Hendrix College	Methodist (UMC)	Conway, Arkansas	South
Millsaps College	Methodist (UMC)	Jackson, Mississippi	South
Morehouse College	None (formerly Baptist)	Atlanta, Georgia	South
Oglethorpe University	None (formerly Presbyterian)	Brookhaven, Georgia	South
Presbyterian College	Presbyterian (PCUSA)	Clinton, South Carolina	South
Randolph College	Methodist (UMC)	Lynchburg, Virginia	South
Randolph–Macon College	Methodist (UMC)	Ashland, Virginia	South
Rhodes College	Presbyterian (PCUSA)	Memphis, Tennessee	South
Roanoke College	Lutheran (ELCA)	Salem, Virginia	South
Rollins College	None (formerly Congregational)	Winter Park, Florida	South
Sewanee: The University of the South	Episcopalian	Sewanee, Tennessee	South
Southwestern University	Methodist (UMC)	Georgetown, Texas	South
Trinity University	Presbyterian (PCUSA)	San Antonio, Texas	South
Transylvania University	Disciples of Christ	Lexington, Kentucky	South
University of Richmond	None (formerly Baptist)	Richmond, Virginia	South
Washington and Lee University	None	Lexington, Virginia	South
William Jewell College	None (formerly Baptist)	Liberty, Missouri	South
Wofford College	Methodist (UMC)	Spartanburg, South Carolina	South
Claremont McKenna College	None	Claremont, California	West
Harvey Mudd College	None	Claremont, California	West
Lewis & Clark College	None (formerly Presbyterian)	Portland, Oregon	West
Occidental College	None (formerly Presbyterian)	Los Angeles, California	West
Pitzer College	None	Claremont, California	West
Pomona College	None	Claremont, California	West
Reed College	None	Portland, Oregon	West
Scripps College	None	Claremont, California	West
Puget Sound, University of	Methodist (UMC)	Tacoma, Washington	West
Redlands, University of	None (formerly Baptist)	Redlands, California	West
Whitman College	None	Walla Walla, Washington	West
Willamette University	None (formerly Methodist)	Salem, Oregon	West
