= Michael Birkner =

American academic, author

President of the Pennsylvania Historical Association
- In office 2014–2016
- Preceded by: Kenneth C. Wolensky
- Succeeded by: Allen Dieterich-Ward

Personal details
- Education: Gettysburg College (BA); University of Virginia (MA)
- Institutions: Gettysburg College
- Website: Official website

Michael J. Birkner is an American academic and author. He served as the Benjamin Franklin Chair of Liberal Arts at Gettysburg College from 2001 to 2016 and has taught at the school since 1989. Birkner is recognized for his biographies of presidents James Buchanan and Dwight Eisenhower. He served as the President of the Pennsylvania Historical Association from 2014 to 2016. Birkner announced his retirement from teaching at Gettysburg College in 2025.

== Education and career ==
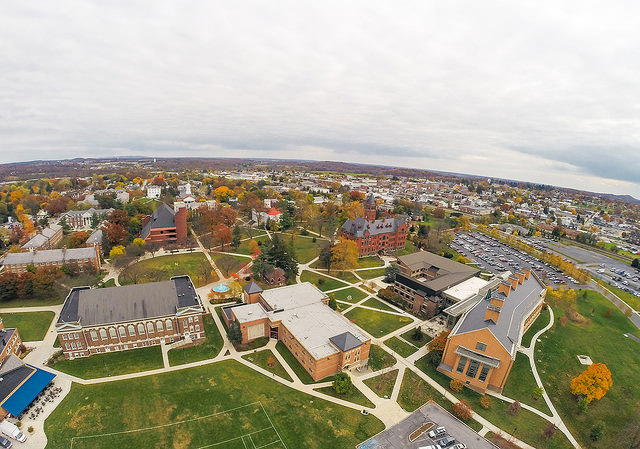
Gettysburg College, where Birkner taught for 38 years

Michael Birkner entered Gettysburg College in 1968 where he studied history and served as the editor-in-chief of The Gettysburgian, the college's student newspaper. He graduated with a BA from Gettysburg College in 1972 and went on to earn his MA and PHD in American history from the University of Virginia.

Birkner returned to Gettysburg College in 1989 where he served as a professor of history. There he served as the Benjamin Franklin Professor of Liberal Arts from 2001 to 2016. After 38 years of teaching at Gettysburg College, Birkner announced his retirement in 2025.

Outside of teaching Birkner served as the editorial page editor and chief editorial writer for New Hampshire's Concord Monitor in the 1980s. He has also written and contributed to many books including The Governors of New Jersey: Biographical Essays (2013), A Country Place No More: The Transformation of Bergenfield, New Jersey, 1894-1994 (1994), a book on the history of Gettysburg College's campus in 2006, multiple volumes on President James Buchanan and a variety of books on Dwight Eisenhower and his family including Encounters With Eisenhower (2015) and Eisenhower's Gettysburg Farm (Images of America) (2017). He also worked twice on the Pulitzer Prize jury for History, including as a jury chair in 2006.
