= J. Matthew Gallman =

American historian

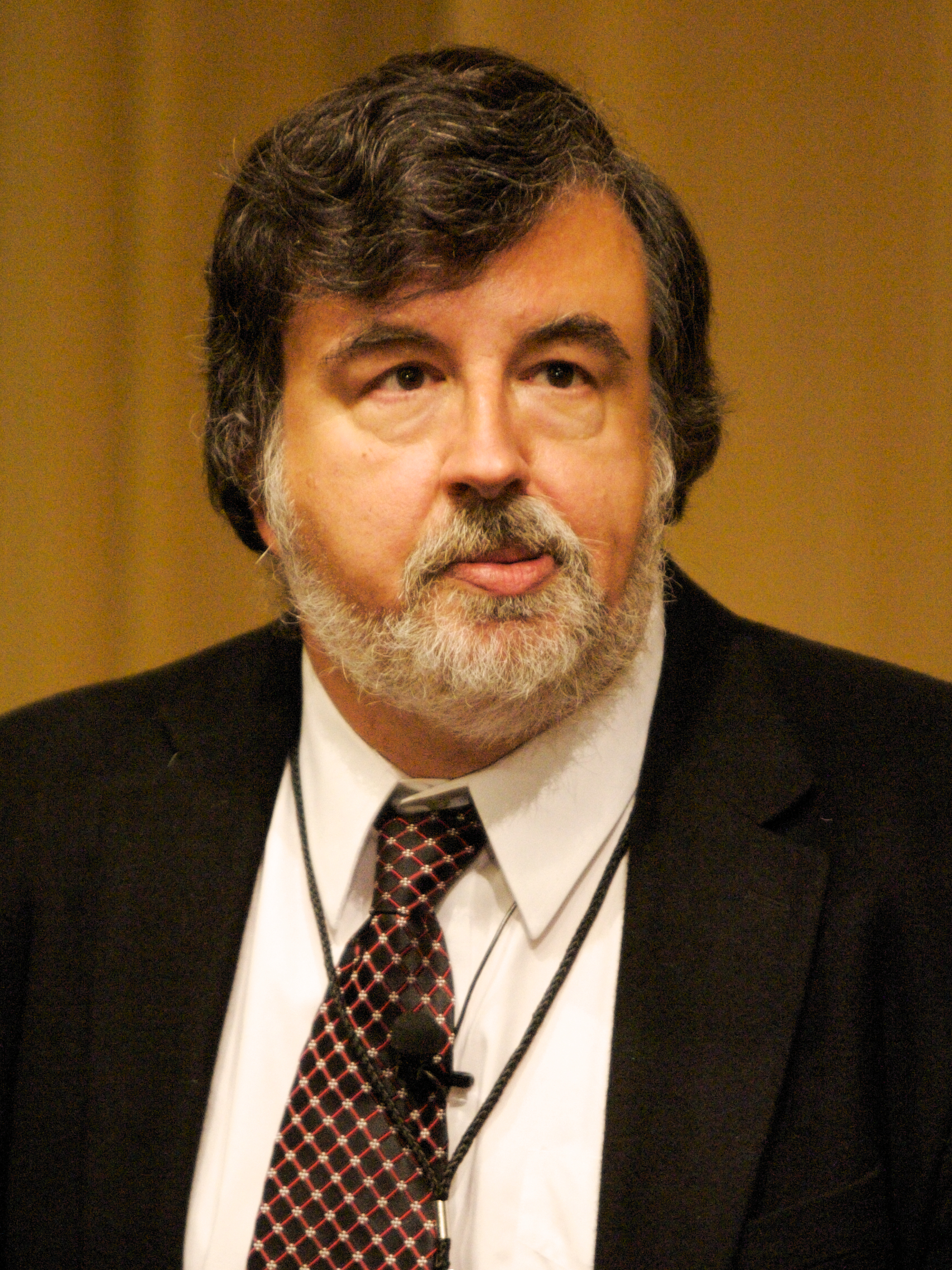
- Gallman in 2010
- Education: Princeton University (BA); Brandeis University (PhD)
- Occupations: Educator and author

J. Matthew Gallman, also known as Matt Gallman, is an American educator and author of books about nineteenth-century history, particularly relating to the American Civil War.

== Education ==
Gallman received his bachelor's degree from Princeton University in 1979 and his Ph.D. in American History from Brandeis University in 1986.

== Career ==
=== Educator ===
He was an assistant professor of history at Loyola University Maryland beginning in 1986. He became an associate professor in 1980 and was made a professor in 1996. From 1998 to 2003, he was a Henry R. Luce professor of the Civil War Era at Gettysburg College. From 2002 to 2003, he was a Ray Allen Billington visiting professor at Occidental College. Since 2003, Gallman has taught undergraduate and graduate courses at the University of Florida Department of History. He has taught courses about the Civil War era, 19th-century America, and American women's history.

=== Author and editor ===
He is a book author, including Mastering Wartime: A Social History of Philadelphia During the Civil War (1990); The North Fights the Civil War: The Home Front (1994); and Receiving Erin's Children: Philadelphia, Liverpool, and the Irish Famine Migration, 1845-1855 (2000). He wrote America's Joan of Arc (2006), about the life of Anna Elizabeth Dickinson, such as the role she played during the Civil War as a successful lecturer for abolition of slavery and against anti-war Democrats, as well as the obstacles faced by women during the 19th century.

He was the first book prize winner in 2016 of the Bobbie and John Nau Book Prize in American Civil War Era History at University of Virginia College and Graduate School of Arts and Sciences for his book Defining Duty in the Civil War. He also won the Florida Book Awards silver medal for general non-fiction that year. According to The American Historical Review, the book states that the "fuel" for the war was the "printed advice patriotic northerners sought and received during the American Civil War". Brandeis Magazine said that the book "gauge[s] ordinary people's fears, hopes and preoccupations during the war. A fascinating look at what the folks back home were really talking about, from cheaply made Union uniforms, to draft dodgers, to the "appropriateness" of black regiments."

He edited the Civil War Chronicle, which provides a chronological account of the political and military events of the war, including writings of Abraham Lincoln, and he co-edited with Gary Gallagher Lens of War, a book of essays by prominent historians about how—personally, professionally or scholarly—they were affected by a favorite Civil War photograph. He wrote the foreword for African American Faces of the Civil War (2012) by Ronald S. Coddington.

Gallman has written other books, contributed to the Journal of Urban History, and books about history, particularly about the Civil War.
