= Gettysburg College =

Private college in Gettysburg, Pennsylvania, US

- Gettysburg College seal
- Former name: Pennsylvania College (1832–1921)
- Motto in English: Do Great Work
- Type: Private liberal arts college
- Established: 1832; 194 years ago
- Religious affiliation: Evangelical Lutheran Church in America
- Academic affiliations: NAICU; Annapolis Group; CLAC
- Endowment: $459.2 million (2025)
- President: Robert W. Iuliano
- Students: 2,086 (fall 2025)
- Location: Gettysburg, Pennsylvania, U.S. 39°50′16″N 77°14′05″W
- Campus: Town, 200 acres (81 ha)
- Founder: Samuel Simon Schmucker
- Colors: Orange & blue
- Nickname: Bullets
- Sporting affiliations: NCAA Division III; Centennial Conference
- Website: www.gettysburg.edu

Gettysburg College is a private liberal arts college in Gettysburg, Pennsylvania. Founded in 1832, the 225-acre (91 ha) campus is adjacent to the Gettysburg Battlefield. In fall 2025, the college enrolled 2,086 students.

The school hosts 24 NCAA Division III men's and women's teams, known as the Bullets, and many club, intramural, and recreational sports programs.

== History ==
=== Founding and early roots ===
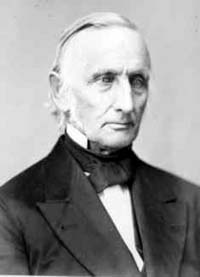
Samuel Simon Schmucker, Gettysburg College founder

Gettysburg College was founded in 1832 as a sister institution for the Lutheran Theological Seminary; the latter is now a campus of the United Lutheran Seminary. Both owe their inception to Thaddeus Stevens, a Radical Republican and abolitionist from Gettysburg. The college's original name was Pennsylvania College; it was founded by Samuel Simon Schmucker.

In 1839, seven years after Gettysburg College was first founded, doctors George McClellan (founder of Jefferson Medical College), Samuel George Morton, and others, founded the Medical School of Pennsylvania College in Philadelphia. The school had money troubles within four years, forcing all founding members to leave their posts. After a failed agreement to combine with the Philadelphia College of Medicine in 1858 (closed in 1859, with the faculty being integrated into Pennsylvania Medical College), the college was forced to close the medical school in 1861. Students from the seceding southern states had withdrawn to return home, leaving it without adequate revenue.

=== Battle of Gettysburg ===
In June 1863, southern Pennsylvania was invaded by Confederate forces during the Gettysburg campaign. Many local militia forces were formed around the area between Chambersburg and Philadelphia to face the oncoming foe.

Among these units was Gettysburg's 26th Pennsylvania Emergency Militia Regiment (PEMR). Composed mostly of students from the college and seminary, the 26th PEMR was mustered into service on June 22, 1863. Four days later, the students saw combat just north of town, skirmishing with advanced units of Confederate division commander Jubal A. Early. Casualties were light on both sides, but about 100 of the militiamen were captured and paroled.

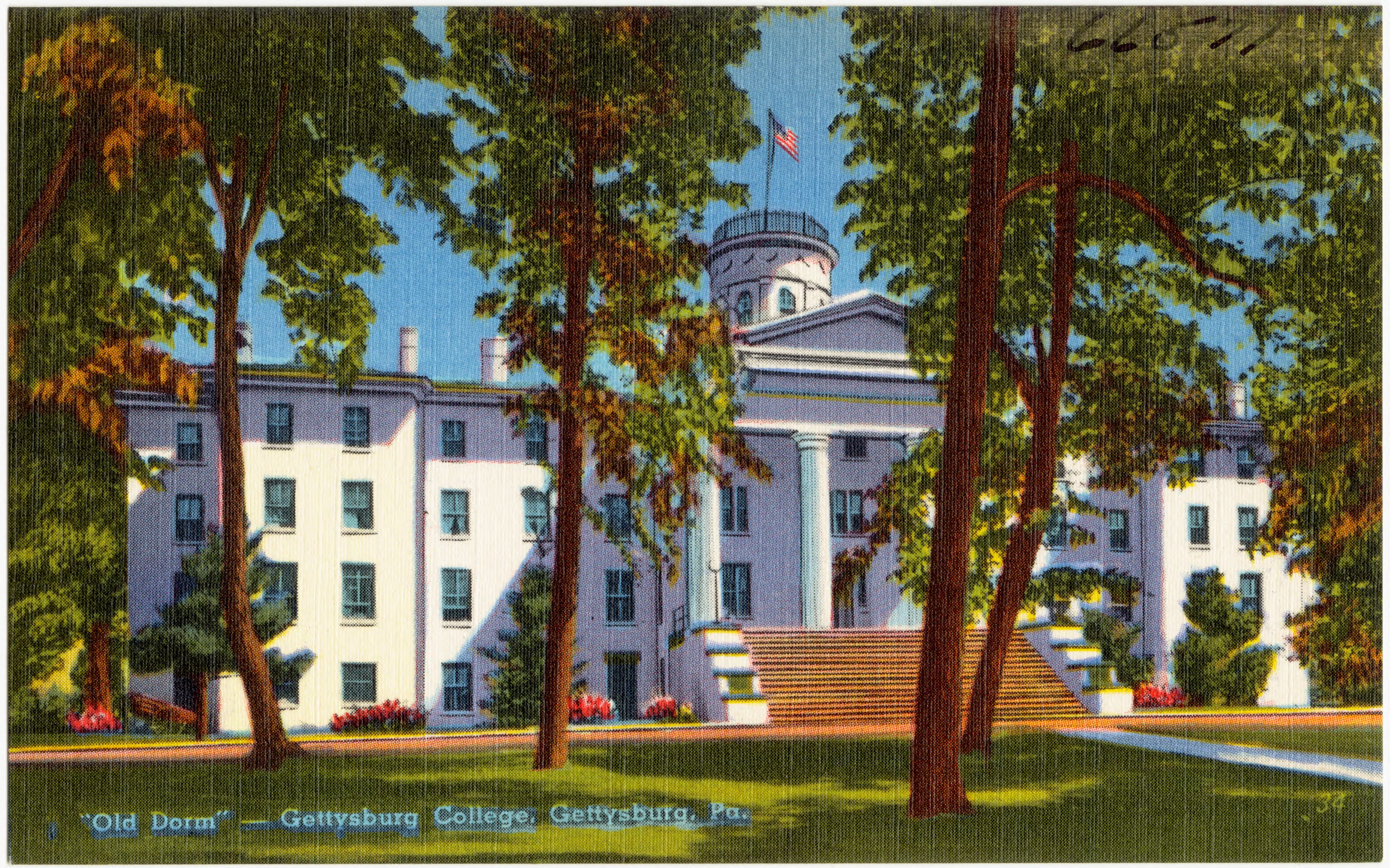
A postcard of Pennsylvania Hall, which was used as a field hospital during the Battle of Gettysburg

During the Battle of Gettysburg, Pennsylvania Hall, also known as Old Dorm, was used as both a signal corps station and field hospital. Due to the geographic position it held, it was used by both Confederate and Union troops at different points during the battle.

On November 19, 1863, college president Henry Louis Baugher gave the benediction at the ceremony opening the Soldiers’ National Cemetery at Gettysburg; speaking after Abraham Lincoln. Classes were cancelled at the college and students and faculty walked with the parade to the cemetery to hear the now famous Gettysburg Address. This walk was later recreated for the now annual tradition of the "First Year Walk." Baugher was the president of Gettysburg College from 1850 until his death in 1868.

Due to its close relationship with this crucial battle, Gettysburg College hosts a number of activities and awards:

- Pennsylvania Hall, located in the center of campus, was occupied by both Union and Confederate forces during the battle. Today, a Civil War era-style flag (for the year 1863) flies above the building, which was used as a lookout position and a field hospital during the battle.
- In 1982, professor and historian Gabor Boritt founded the Civil War Institute, which hosts annual seminars and tours on Civil War themes. Scholarships are granted to high school students and history teachers to attend the week-long summer event.
- Since 1998, the "Gettysburg Semester", a semester-long immersion in Civil War academic study has been offered.
- Gettysburg College students can elect to pursue a unique interdisciplinary minor in Civil War Era Studies. Requirements include a general introduction course about the Civil War and a capstone senior-level seminar. Students must also select four classes of at least two disciplines. Classes offered include military history, economics of the American South, Civil War literature, films about the Civil War, and gender ideology in the Civil War.
- The Lincoln Prize has been awarded annually since 1991 for the best non-fiction historical work on the Civil War.
- Starting in 2005, the Michael Shaara Prize has been awarded for excellence in Civil War fiction. Shaara was the author of the Pulitzer Prize-winning 1974 novel about the Battle of Gettysburg, The Killer Angels.
- Author Mark Nesbitt's Ghosts of Gettysburg: Spirits, Apparitions and Haunted Places of the Battlefield claims several sightings of paranormal activity on the campus, most notably in Pennsylvania Hall.

Gettysburg College in 1863

=== Gettysburg College in the 19th-Century ===
Following the war, the college was racked with repairs and financial difficulties as well as debates over the degree that Lutheran theology was to be part of the teaching curriculum. This era was characterized by the enlargement of the campus grounds, advances in scientific education, the addition of new endowed professorships, and a growing student body, including the admission of the college's first female students. Beulah Tipton entered Gettysburg in 188, becoming its first female student, however illness cut her studies short, and she did not graduate. The first female graduates of Gettysburg College were Margaret Himes and Cora Hartman, who joined the school in 1890.

This period was also marked by the construction of many new campus buildings including Stevens Hall in 1867, an observatory in 1874, Glatfelter Hall in 1889, Brua Chapel in 1890, and McKnight Hall in 1898.

=== Relationship with the Eisenhowers ===
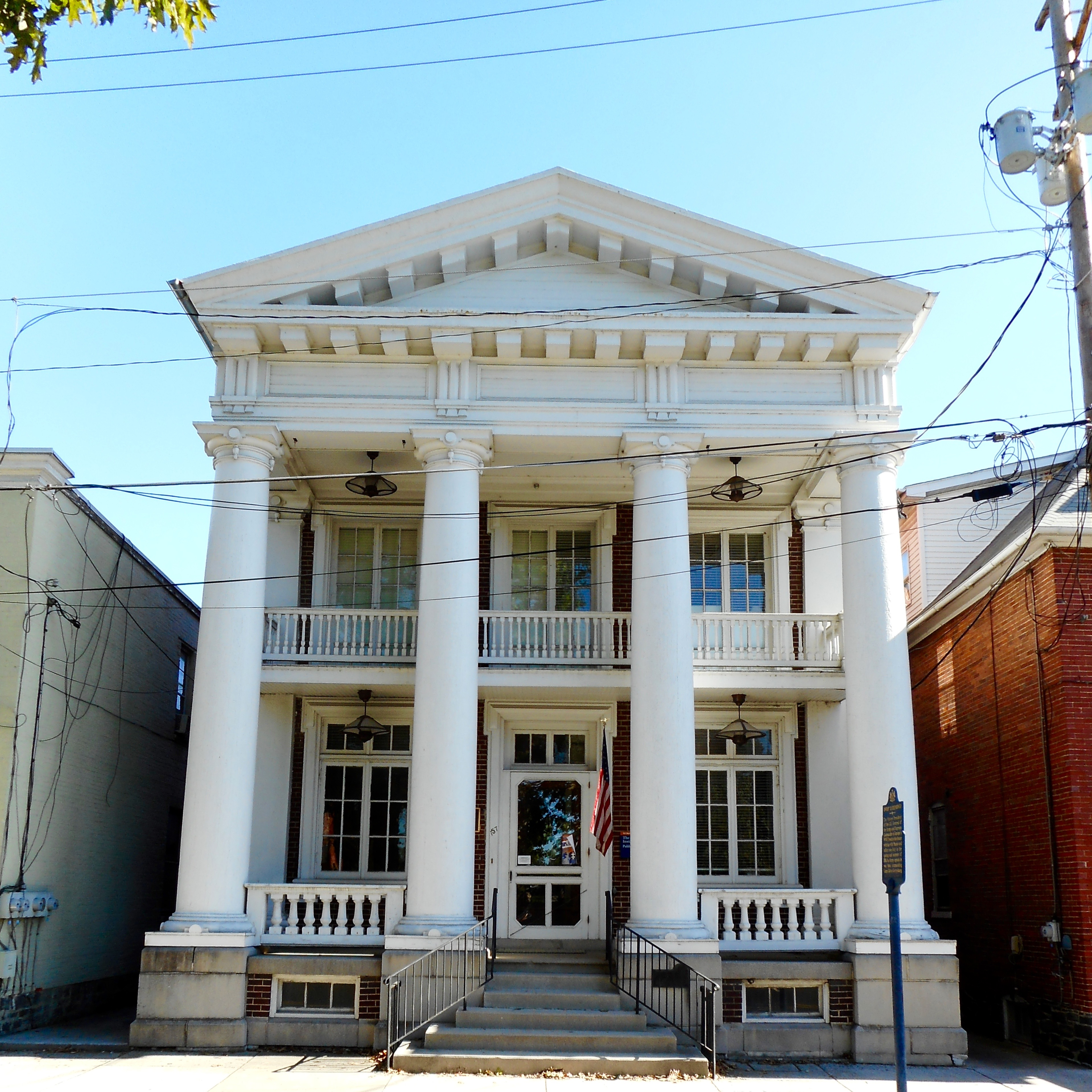
House on Washington St. occupied by the Eisenhowers

Early in his military career, Dwight D. Eisenhower and his wife, Mamie, lived in a house in Gettysburg that was across the street from the college (the Alpha Tau Omega Fraternity House until 1955 on N. Washington Street). Both were fond of the town, so they decided to retire to a working farm adjacent to the battlefield after Eisenhower left the army. It was there that President Eisenhower recuperated from his 1955 heart attack.

While living in Gettysburg, Eisenhower became involved with Gettysburg College. He served on the Gettysburg College board of trustees, and he was given an office, which he used when writing his memoirs. Eisenhower's old office is now named Eisenhower House and is occupied by the college's office of admissions. Eisenhower's grandson, David, and his granddaughter Susan continue a certain level of family involvement with the institution.

Today the Eisenhower Institute, a nationally recognized center for leadership and public policy based in Gettysburg and Washington, D.C., is formally recognized as a distinctive program of the college.

== Campus ==
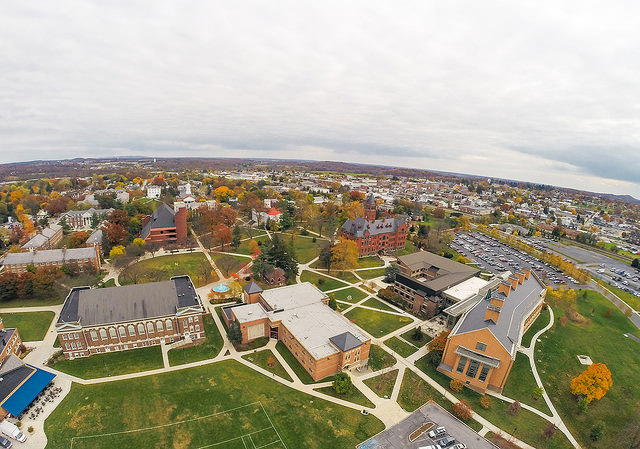
The campus as seen from the air. From left to right in the foreground: College Union Building, Plank Gym, Master's Hall, Science Center Complex

The college is located on a 225-acre (91 ha) campus adjacent to the Gettysburg National Military Park. Gettysburg, Pennsylvania, is 36 miles (58 km) from Harrisburg, 55 mi (89 km) from Baltimore, 80 mi (130 km) from Washington, D.C., 117 mi (188 km) from Philadelphia, 212 mi (341 km) from New York City, and 425 mi (684 km) from Boston.

The college's main campus has over 90 buildings, many of which are historically relevant, and is roughly divided in half by Pennsylvania Hall (administration). The northern half contains Eddie Plank Gym, Masters Hall (physics and astronomy), Musselman Library, the College Union Building, the College Dining Center, Briedenbaugh Hall (English and Asian Studies), Weidensall Hall (History and Education), and several first-year residence halls and fraternities. A section of this part of campus known as "Stine Lake" is not actually a lake but rather a quad located outside of the library. Prior to the Musselman Library being built in the late 1970s, and due to Gettysburg's wet climate and drainage issues, the quad and library site were prone to accumulating water, creating a large, muddy "lake" of sorts. Today, Stine Lake does not flood, but the name has stuck, to the confusion of first-year students. Additionally, the College Dining Center is known to students and faculty as "Servo," after the now defunct 1980s food service company, Servomation.

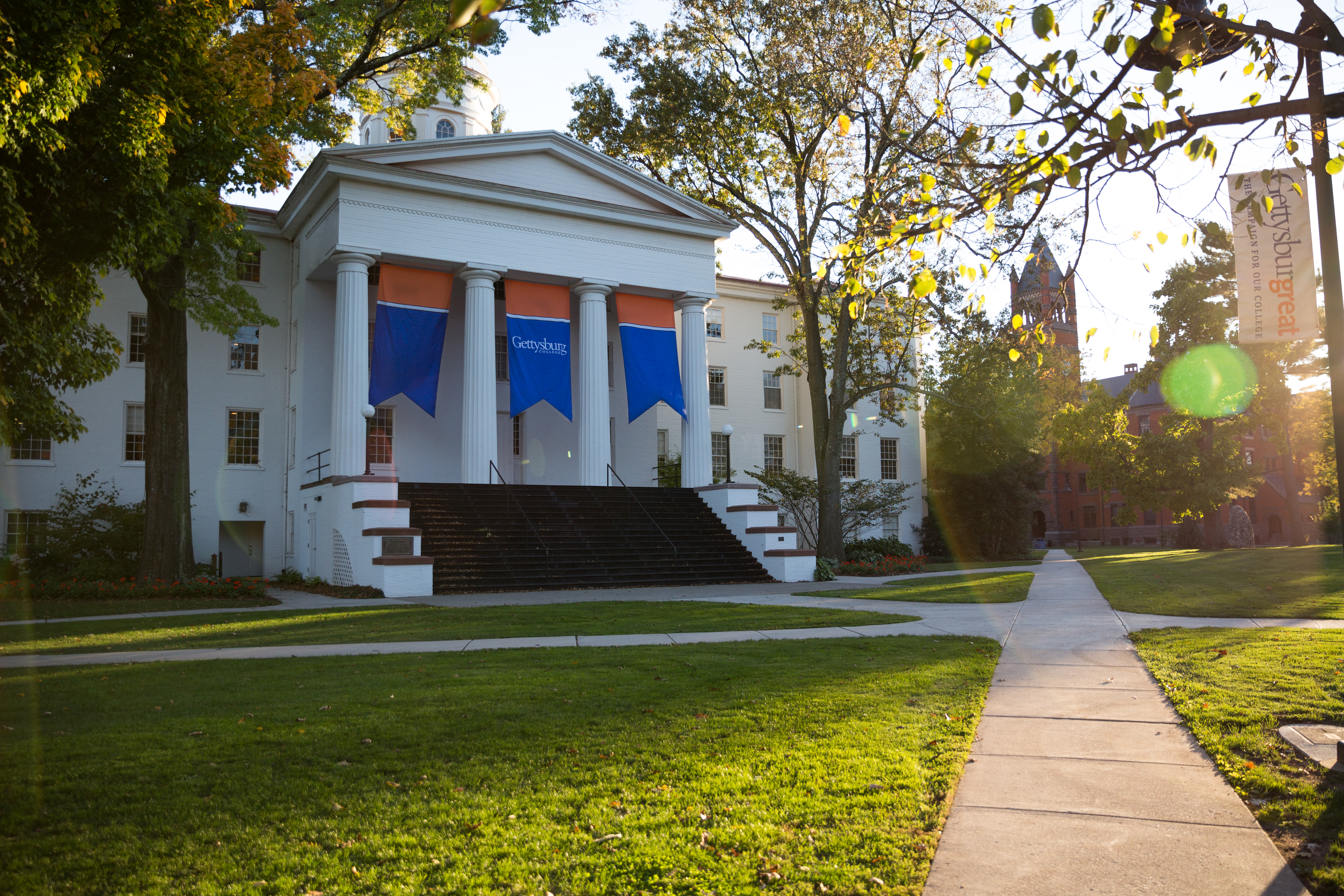
Pennsylvania Hall as it appears today. It now serves as the college's main administration building.

The southern half of the main campus includes McKnight Hall (languages), Glatfelter Hall (computer science, management, political science, mathematics, and others), Schmucker Hall (art and music), Brua Hall, and several fraternities. Over the last half-century, the campus has expanded considerably to include land to the east of North Washington Street and to the west of the traditional campus. In that time, the campus has undergone many renovations, with buildings being added and removed.

Since approximately 96% of students live on campus, most of this additional land is dedicated to housing. It also includes the college chapel, the admissions building, a large gymnasium and field house complex, and several athletics fields. The college has also purchased or leased many buildings for student housing, including residences on Washington Street, Carlisle Street, Middle Street, and Stratton Street.

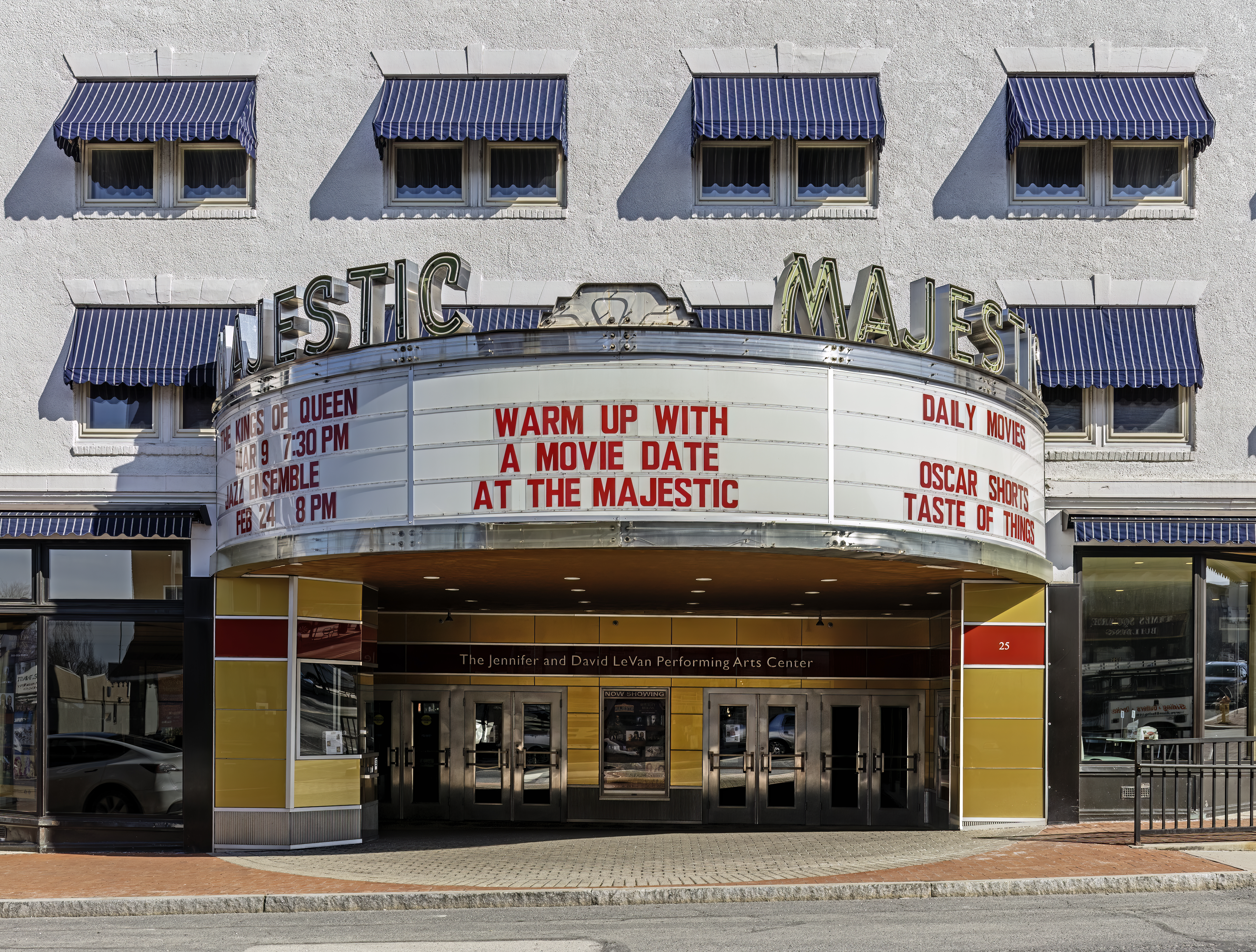
The marquee of the historic 1925 Majestic Theater

=== The Majestic Theater ===
In 1925, Henry Scharf built the Majestic Theater as an expansion to the historic Gettysburg Hotel, located in the center of town. Originally, the building featured a main room that seated 1,200 patrons. In the 1950s, performances in the Theater were attended by President Dwight D. Eisenhower and his wife, often with world leaders or visitors. When he was spending the night in his Gettysburg residence, President Eisenhower used the theater's ballroom as an official White House Press Room for news conferences. The theater was also the location for the world premiere of the civil war epic Gettysburg (1993 film), produced by Ted Turner. In November 2005, the theater underwent a $20 million renovation process, with the main room being restored to its former glory and the addition of two new nightly cinemas. The theater is the location for the college's Sunderman Conservatory of Music performances, as well as musical theater performances and outside guests. Many traditions and orientation events also occur in the building, which seats 816 individuals in a multi-level main room.

=== Academic facilities ===
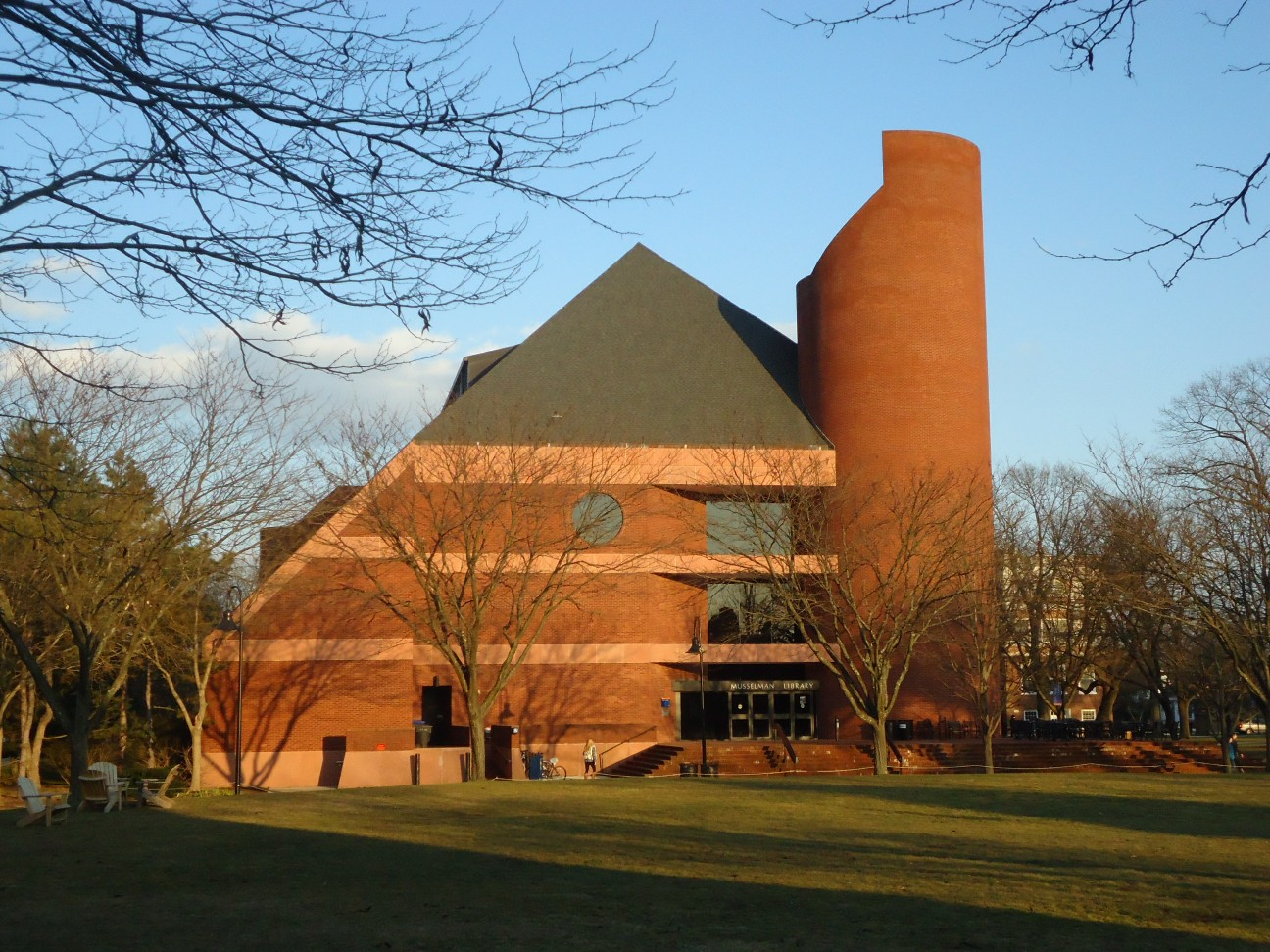
Musselman Library, built in 1981

==== Library ====
Musselman Library provides access to books, journals, videos, sound recordings, rare books, and manuscripts, many in online format. The online catalog is freely available and provides a description of the books, DVDs, and CDs in the collection. The journal locator provides a list of online and print journals in the collection. A list of the online databases is available on the library's website. Exhibits are displayed throughout the library and are updated on a regular basis. The library maintains Gettysburg College's institutional repository, The Cupola: Scholarship at Gettysburg College, a collection of scholarly and creative works produced by faculty, students, and other members of the Gettysburg College community.

Special Collections and College Archives, located on the fourth floor of the library, collects primary sources including rare books, manuscripts, maps, art works, sound recordings, photographs, and other materials which support the curriculum. Special Collections is also home to the College Archives, which preserves records that document college activities, policies, and programs. Rotating exhibits are on display in the Reading Room. Selected items and collections have been digitized and are available via GettDigital.

The building was designed by architect Hugh Newell Jacobsen, who intended the building to complement Glatfelter Hall (1889). Jacobsen referred to the architectural style as "abstract Romanesque". The building project commenced thanks to a large gift from the Emma G. Musselman Foundation. Construction began in 1979 and the building opened on April 22, 1981. Books and other materials were transferred from Schmucker Memorial Library to Musselman Library via a human chain of students, faculty and others. In 1986, Jacobsen won both the Award for Excellence in Institutional Masonry Design and the Grand Award for Excellence in Masonry Design for his design of Musselman Library.

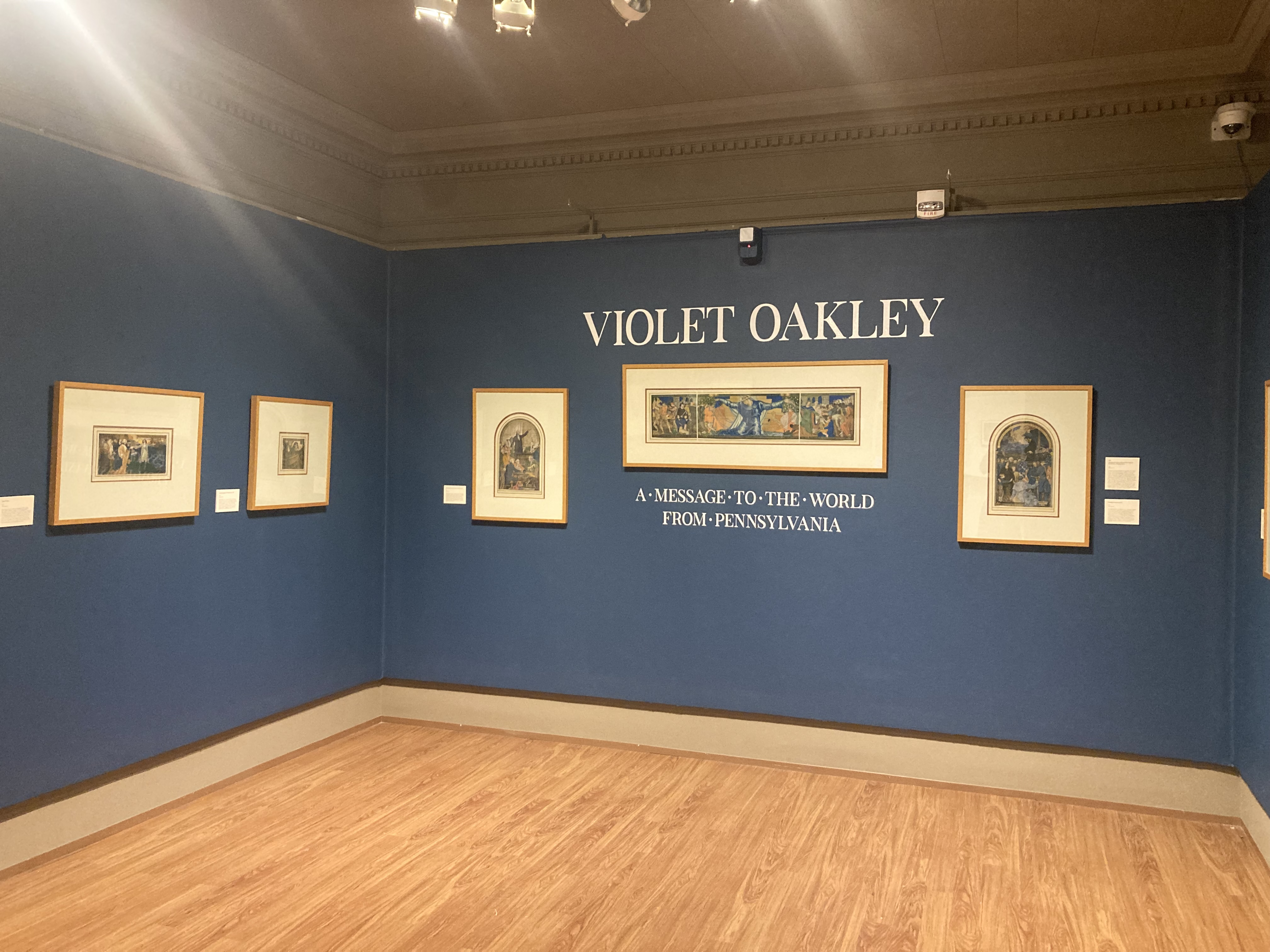
The interior of the Schmucker Art Gallery during a 2024 exhibition on Violet Oakley

==== Schmucker Hall ====
Gettysburg College is a well-respected institution for the musically and artistically inclined. The college is home to the Sunderman Conservatory of Music, which has performed regionally and internationally. Schmucker Hall, the home of the Arts and Music departments, houses four main classrooms, a 225-seat recital hall, a 10 station technology/piano lab, and 16 practice rooms. Two practice rooms are dedicated organ practice rooms, with a ratio of six students for one practice room. A recording studio is also found within the building's walls. Choral assemblies usually perform in Christ Chapel, the campus' nondenominational structure that houses a variety of different ceremonies and seats 1,100 individuals. Schmucker Hall is also home to the Schmucker Art Gallery, an exhibition space which hosts several exhibitions a year by student curators and artists as well as professional artists featuring original art and pieces from Gettysburg College's sizeable Special Collections.

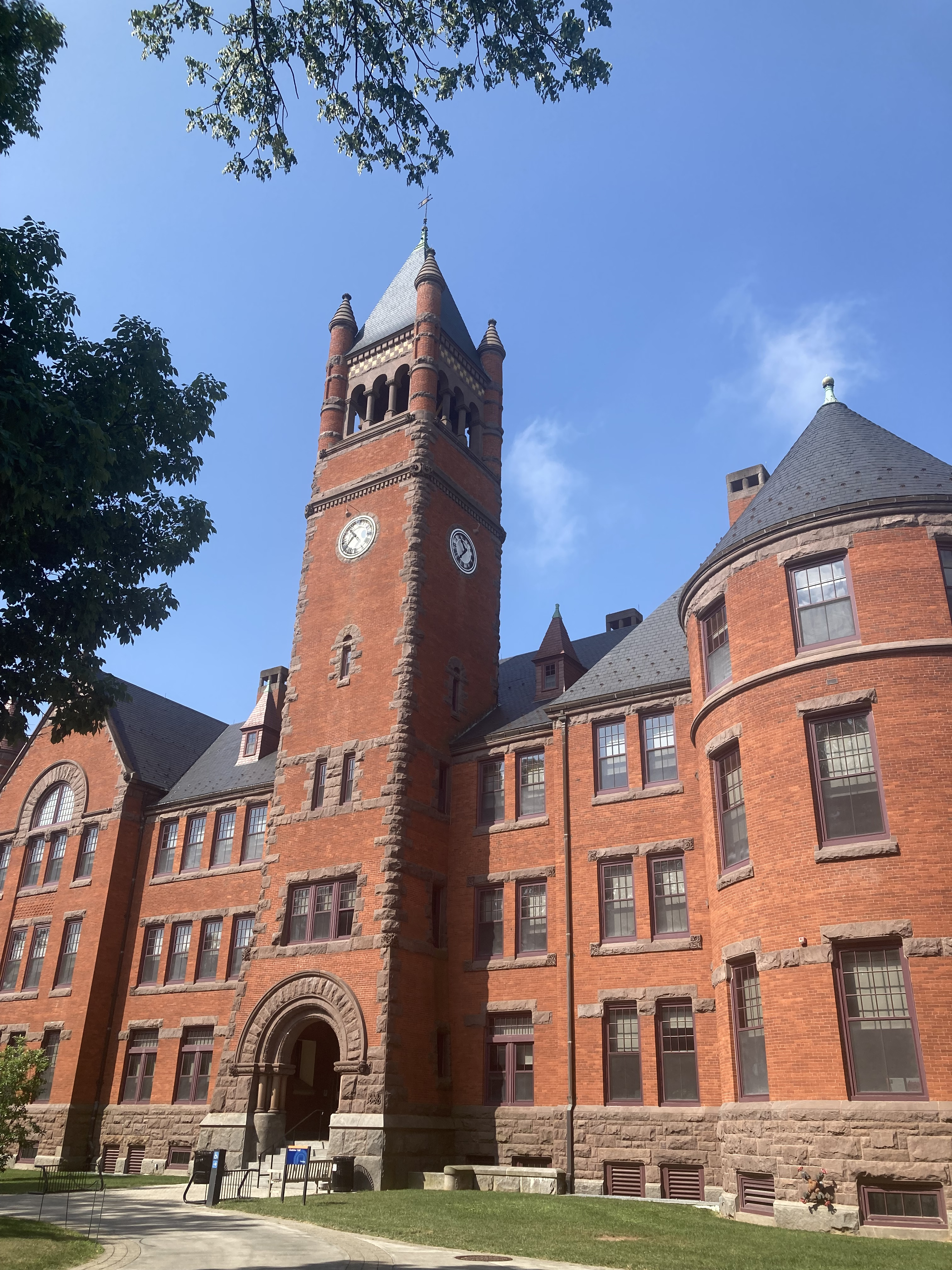
The historic Glatfelter Hall, built in 1889

==== Glatfelter Hall ====
Glatfelter Hall is one of the most iconic buildings on campus. Built in 1889 as the New Recitation Building, the deep red brick and gray stone building was rededicated in 1912 to honor Philip H. Glatfelter, a trustee and generous benefactor of the college. The building was built in the Romanesque Revival style, with a tower 143 feet high.

Currently, the building features four stories and a basement, with a grandiose main staircase traversing all but the top floor. The building houses the Anthropology, Computer Science, Mathematics, Political Science, Management, and Sociology departments, along with campus management resources. It is completely handicap accessible, with an elevator traversing all floors. The topmost section of the building contains offices, seminar areas, and a small student library, as well as the entrance to the belltower. Atop the tower, Glatfelter Hall's bell can be heard across campus, ringing to mark the hour.

Renovations:

- In 1929 a thorough interior renovation was implemented, providing additional windows in the north and west facades.
- Between 1989 and 1991, a tower was added for an elevator and stairwell on the south façade and the buildings large attic was refurbished for academic use.
- Between 2013 and 2014, the interior was renovated consisting of waterproofing the foundation; the addition of a new classroom and seminar room on the ground floor; and mechanical, lighting, sprinklers, and design changed throughout the building.

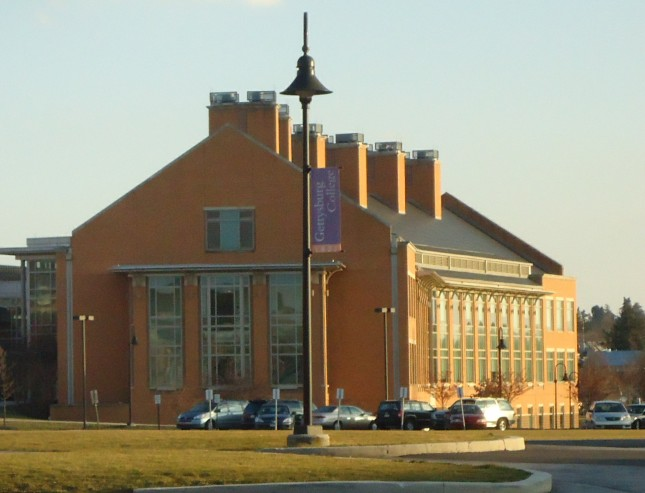
The Science Center, built in 2002

==== The Science Center ====
The Science Center is part of a complex of two buildings. The Science Center is the newest building on campus being built in 2002. An 85,000 sq ft (7,900 m^{2}) building, the science center was designed to have first-rate scientific equipment, facilities, and resources, and has been continually renovated to include the most up to date material. It includes:

- Greenhouse and herbarium
- 400 MHz NMR spectrometer
- Nd:YAG laser spectrometer
- A scanning electron microscope and transmission electron microscope
- Specialized labs for a dozen different subjects
- Phase contrast and epifluorescence microscopes
- Animal rooms for endotherms and ectotherms
- Media preparation room (with autoclave, radiation room, and a walk-in environmental chamber)
- Multimedia 'smart' classrooms, lecture rooms, and seminar rooms
- Computer labs
- Dozens of other resources

The main building is home to the Chemistry, Environmental Studies, and Health Sciences departments.

McCreary Hall is the other building in the complex, and is older but was renovated during the construction of the Science Center and in 2012. It is home to the Biology and Psychology departments, with the latest equipment including a vast deionized pure water system, infant research lab, space for cognitive neuroscience, and many animal facilities.

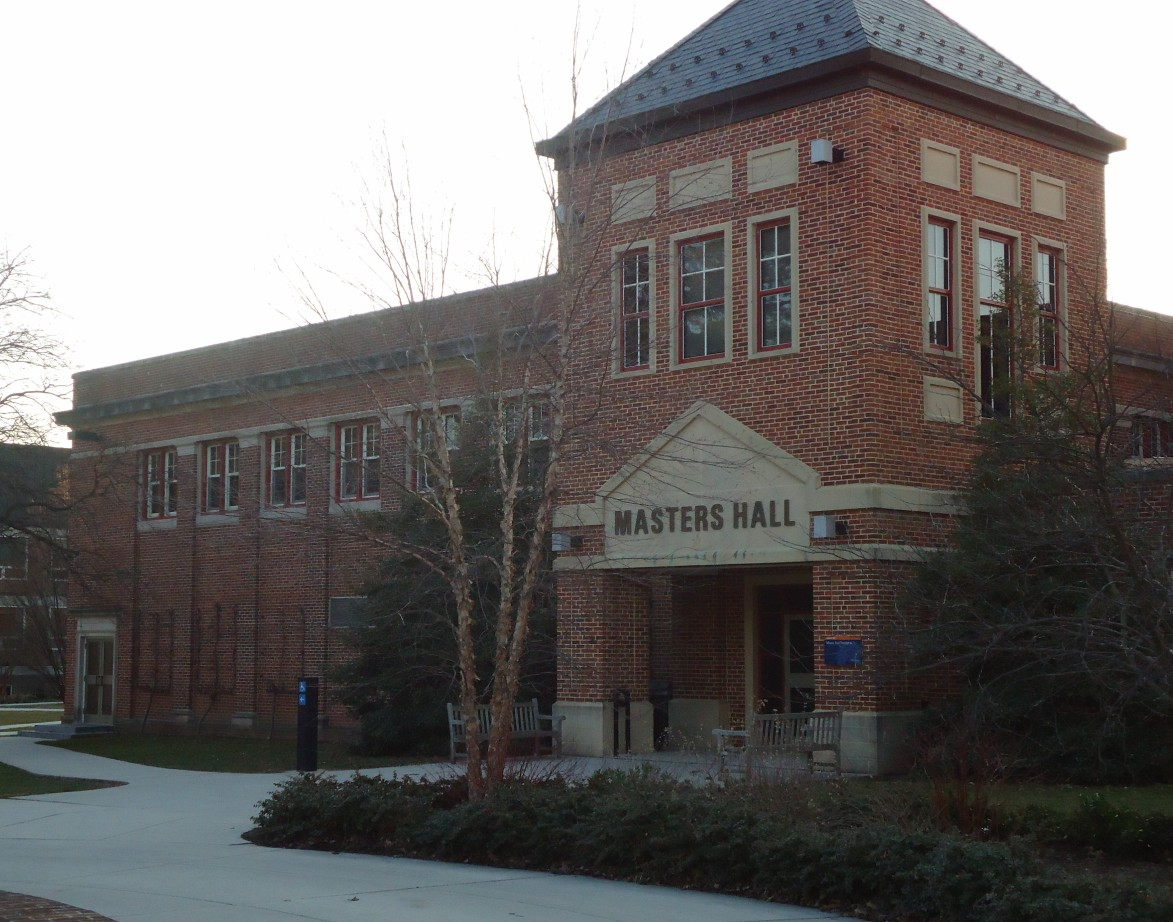
Master's Hall, home of the college's physics department

==== Masters Hall ====
Masters Hall is home to the physics department, and houses several specialized labs, the largest classroom on campus (Mara Auditorium), a machine shop, and a Physics student lounge. In addition, the building also includes an indoor planetarium, Hatter Planetarium which gives students glimpses of what the night sky will look like each month. It also has private shows for classes and performances on different, special topics. Some of the equipment available for student use and regularly used for professor's research includes:

- Modernized telescopes and microscopes
- An advanced laser research lab used for investigating plasma and laser interactions; includes 25-milliwatt He-Ne laser, two 5 watt argon ion lasers, nitrogen dye laser, and other equipment
- Optical isolation table and optical tweezers
- Other technology relevant to specific classes and professors' research

The building houses astronomy classes and uses the campus' observatory, which is located just past the quarry. The observatory is used for undergraduate astronomical research and includes a 16-inch f/11 Ealing Cassegrain reflector, computer controlled. It also houses a classroom and six Meade telescopes. Since its construction in 1996, the observatory has been a huge benefit to astronomy students and has even made several star discoveries in the early 2000s. The Physics Department has supported Project CLEA for Astronomy.

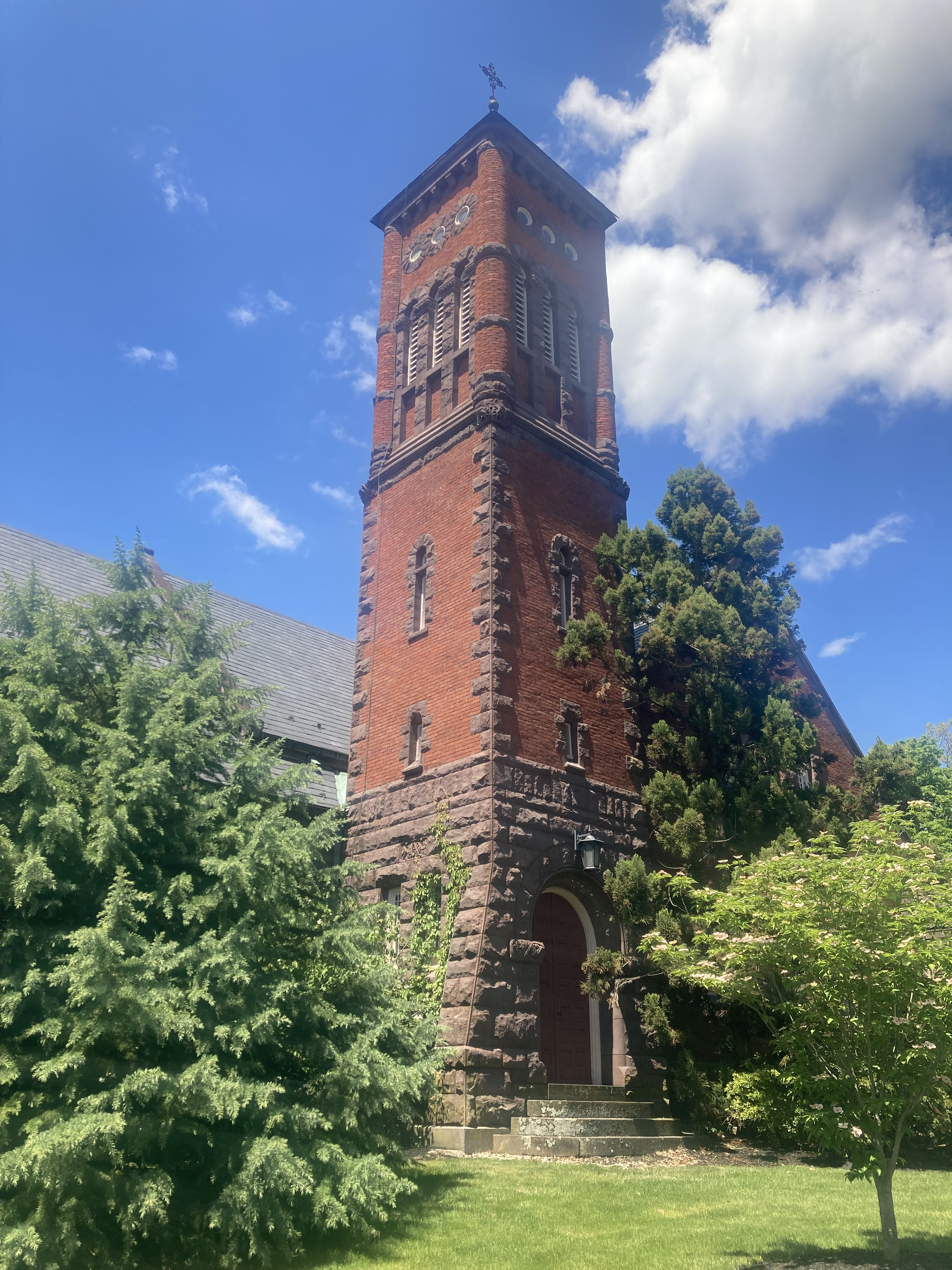
The historic Brua Hall, built c.1890

==== Brua Hall ====
Brua Hall, formerly known as Brua Chapel, was originally designed as the college's new Lutheran chapel in 1890, a role it served until the dedication of the new Christ Chapel in 1953. The chapel was first intended to be attached to the back of Glatfelter Hall, creating a west wing, but was later constructed as a separate building by Glatfelter Hall's architect, John A. Dempwolf, after a major gift by the Brua Family.

Brua Hall is now the home of the college's theater department. Kline Theatre is the building's main attraction, seating 234 people with a thrust stage and an advanced sound and lighting system, including computer lighting memory control. The stage is home to many performances throughout the year, and is very often used by the theater department in addition to the student run theatre club, the Owl and Nightingale Society. Brua Hall also has a 48-seat blackbox, which with flexible playing space is constantly converted to fit the needs of the performance. The blackbox, Stevens Laboratory Theatre, is used for thesis productions from seniors as well as one-act plays written by students. The building has a fully equipped scene shop facility, studio and classroom space, dressing rooms, an Actors' Lounge and reception area known as Arms Green Room, and other storage and workroom areas.

Large-scale productions are generally performed in the Majestic Theater.

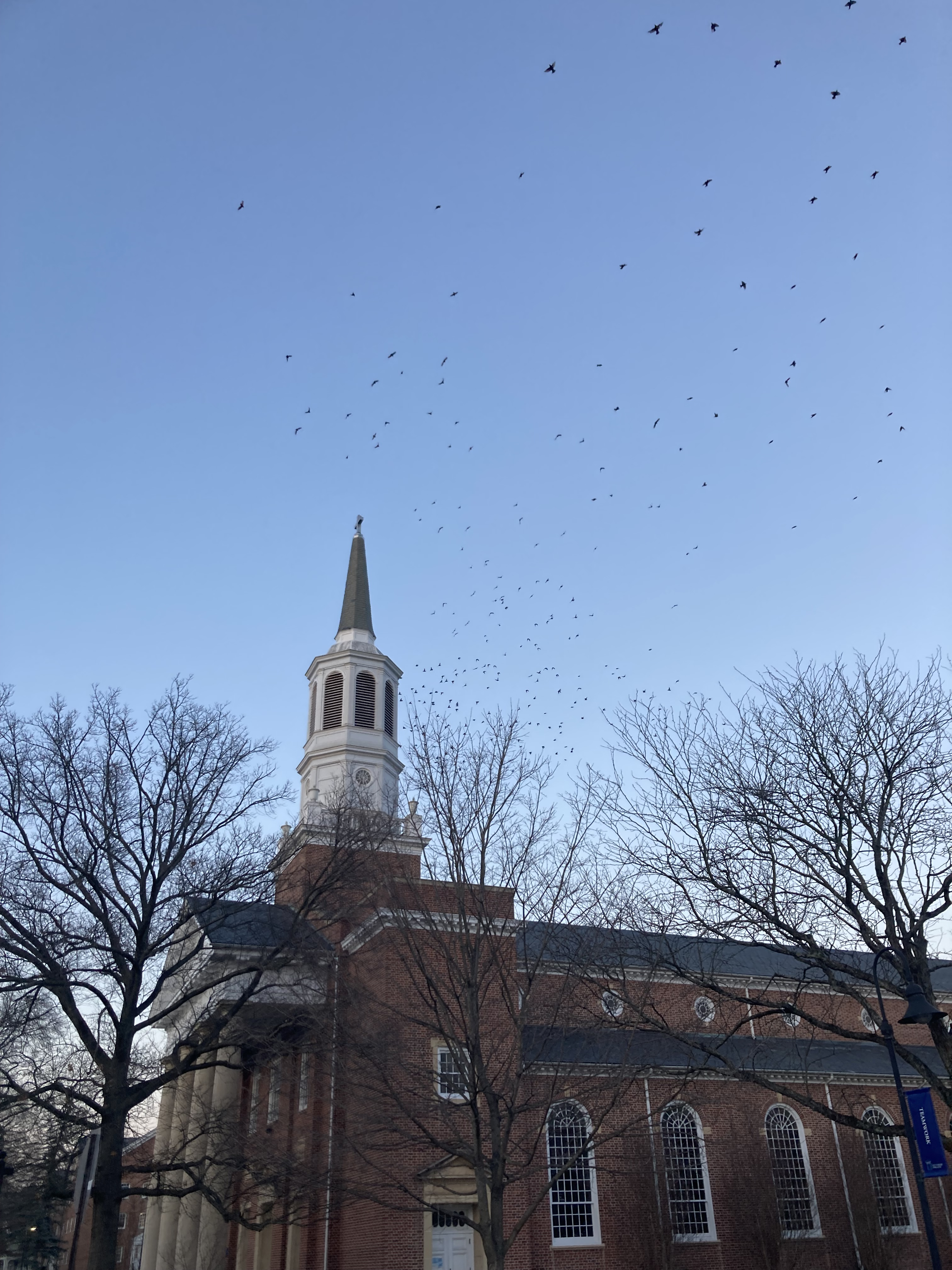
Christ Chapel in 2024

==== Christ Chapel ====
Christ Chapel is the center of Gettysburg College's religious and spiritual life. It was dedicated on October 17, 1953 to serve as the new college chapel after the college had outgrown Brua Chapel. It was designed by college architect Alfred Hamme and built at a cost of nearly $600,000. Each academic year into the mid-1960s, the college held Religious Emphasis Week which drew large crowds to the college chapel. In 1970 a group of college students, alumni and four faculty members put on a dramatic production of Andrew Lloyd Webber's Jesus Christ Superstar in Christ Chapel. This was achieved by skirting the copyright to the score by calling the performances "rehearsals". Each of the two nights of performances was attended by an at capacity audience and ended with a standing ovation.

==== Other buildings ====
Economics and Africana studies are housed in a former house that was fully renovated in 2013, as well as in rooms in Glatfelter Hall.

Breidenbaugh Hall and Weidensall Hall are two adjacent buildings that house the English, Asian Studies, Civil War Era Studies, Classics, Education, Globalization Studies, History, Interdisciplinary Studies, Philosophy, and Religion departments. Weidensall Hall was originally built as a YMCA building, complete with a swimming pool, but was massively renovated in 1987. Both buildings feature a revived colonial design, with large columns supporting spacious porches.

==== Technology ====
Full network capabilities in all campus buildings and each residence hall room. Students have access to more than 1,300 computers and a complex system of workstations and laboratories. Wireless connectivity is available across 97% of the campus (the other 3% being the practice fields) and in all of the residence halls.

The school provides a large network of technological assistance, known as G-Tech, which is student staffed and IT supported. It offers free technical services including help with personal computers, removing adware or viruses, connecting to the college network, building computers, accessing school servers, and general troubleshooting assistance. The college's network infrastructure has been consistently updated over the past decade to keep up with student demand and modernity. In addition, the technology department has deals for students and faculty to receive discounted personal computers and programs.

The campus welcomed Google in July 2012 to open the 225-acre campus to Google Streetview. Prospective students are able to walk through every inch of campus to see the facilities and fields.

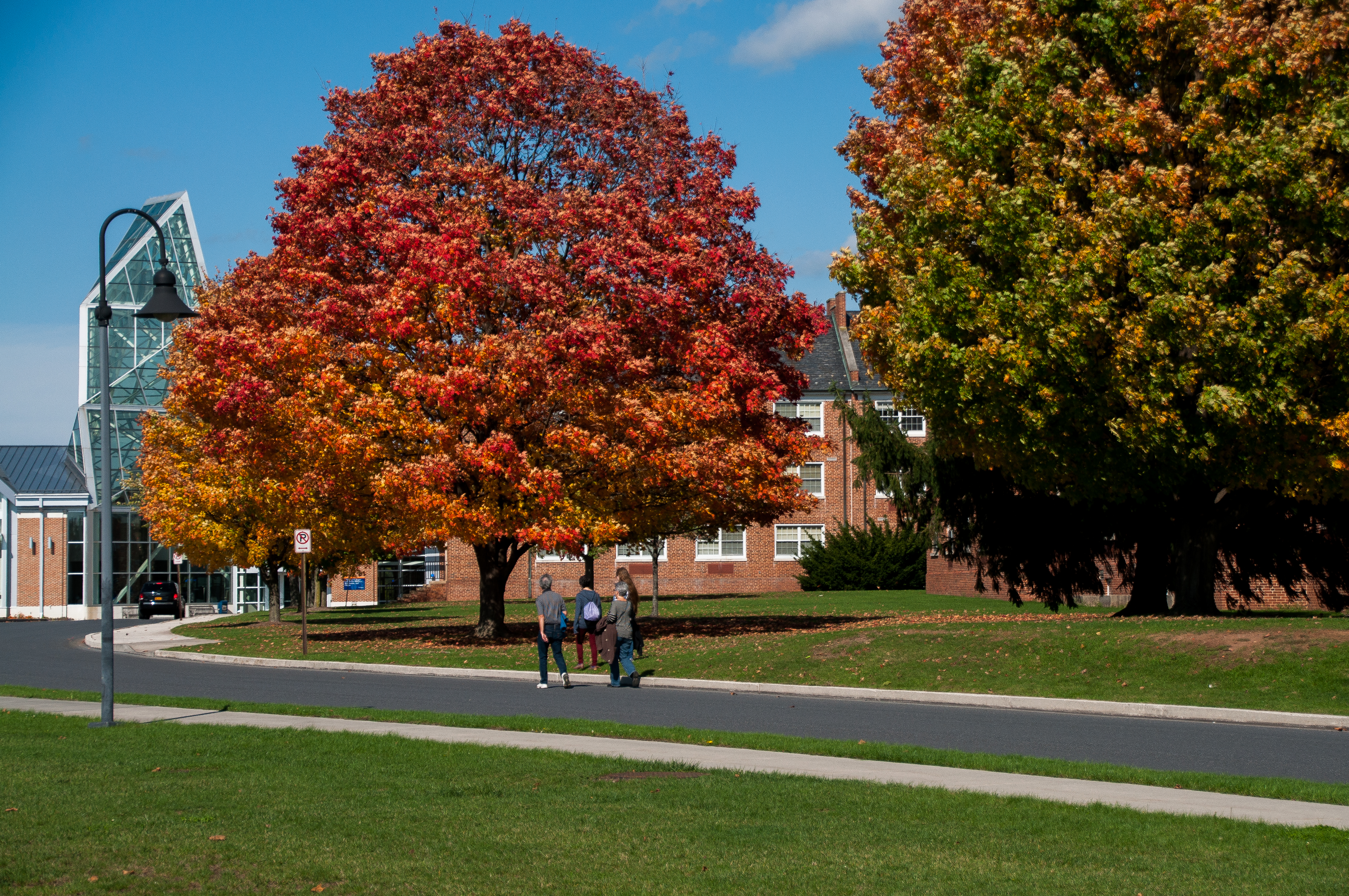
The Jaeger Center in the Fall

==== The Center for Athletics, Recreation and Fitness ====
The college broke ground on the new $25 million athletic center, named the John F. Jaeger Center for Athletics, Recreation and Fitness, on May 30, 2008. The 55,000-square-foot (5,100 m^{2}) center is an upgrade from the former athletic facility, known as the Bream/Wright/Hauser Complex. Bream/Wright/Hauser still exists next to the additions. The center opened in stages. A dedication ceremony on April 30, 2010, marked its completion. The center was officially named for the 1965 alumnus John F. Jaeger on May 4, 2012.

The center features:

- A natatorium, complete with eight lanes, four warm-up lanes, and enough space for 350 seated spectators
- A 10,000-square-foot (930 m^{2}) weight and cardio room complete with flat-screen TVs
- Additional spaces for yoga, aerobics, spinning and martial arts classes
- An upgraded training room with a Hydroworx pool
- Rock climbing walls
- A student lounge and dining space called "The Dive"

The center was created in order to provide more opportunities for the high percentage of students who like to maintain their fitness regimens and engage in intramural, club sports programs, and exercise classes. About 25 percent of the student body participate in varsity sports, while over 75 percent are active in intramural sports. More space was needed, and the center is important to improve life on campus.

John Jaeger, a 1965 Gettysburg College graduate, donated $1.2 million to encourage others to fund the project. Another important donor, Robert Ortenzio, provided the largest single gift by a living person in the history of the college, by giving $2 million.

=== Campus safety ===
Gettysburg College's Department of Public Safety (DPS) is the primary agency responsible for the enforcement of college policies, security, and emergency response on the campus. Emergency medical services (EMS) are provided by Adams Regional EMS's MICU 54–1 and Biglerville Fire Department's MICU 6–1, when needed. The college falls under Gettysburg's Volunteer Fire Department's first-due response area.

== Academics and student life ==
Academic rankings

Liberal arts
- U.S. News & World Report: 55
- Washington Monthly: 43

National
- Forbes: 178
- WSJ/College Pulse: 122

As an independent institution, the college operates under a charter granted in 1832 by the Commonwealth of Pennsylvania. The college is governed by a 39-member board of trustees comprising leaders from a range of professions and walks of life. Thirty of the college's trustees are graduates of Gettysburg. Gettysburg is considered a more selective college, with admission rates recently hovering around 40%. The Class of 2022 had a 45.4% acceptance rate, and Gettysburg often competes with comparable schools Dickinson and Franklin & Marshall for applicants. 83% of the class of 2022 was in the top 25% of their high schools, 62% of students were in the top 10% of their school.

In fall 2025, 2,086 students attended the college, divided approximately evenly between men and women. Students came from 62 countries or territories with 71% of US students joining the college from outside of Pennsylvania. For students who entered in fall 2019, 79% graduated within six years.

The college employed about 2000 full-time faculty in fall 2025, with 97% holding a doctorate or highest earned degree in their fields.

=== Academic programs ===
Gettysburg College offers numerous fields of study and four possible degrees; Bachelor of Arts, Bachelor of Science, Bachelor of Music, and Bachelor of Music Education.

In addition to its many majors and minors, the college offers several programs. Students may petition to design their own, individual, major. The major must consist of at least 17 courses, including a methods course and a 400-level capstone. Students design a curriculum of their own and choose a faculty advisor. During the senior year, the student takes a 400-level individualized study capstone which is the culmination of their program.

An engineering program is offered as a five-year, dual-degree program in conjunction with Columbia University, Rensselaer Polytechnic Institute, Washington University in St. Louis, and University of Pittsburgh. Engineering students may choose any of these schools, taking three courses of liberal arts, mathematics, and physics at Gettysburg College and two years of advanced engineering and physics classes at their chosen university. Upon completion of the program, students are awarded a Bachelor of Arts degree from Gettysburg College and a Bachelor of Science degree in an engineering discipline from one of the affiliated institutions.

The most popular majors, by 2021 graduates, were:

Econometrics & Quantitative Economics (64)
Political Science & Government (64)
Health Sciences (60)
Business Administration & Management (56)
History (38)
Experimental Psychology (35)
Environmental Studies (34)
Biology/Biological Sciences (33)

=== Sunderman Conservatory of Music ===
Music at Gettysburg College began in 1900 with a glee club and a guitar and mandolin club. It was not until 1934 that music classes were first taught at Gettysburg College; Professor Frederick Shaffer taught music appreciation. The following year, the college hired Parker Wagnild to direct a new choir open to both men and women. Wagnild would graduate from the Gettysburg Theological Seminary with a divinity degree in 1937, and would then be hired as an English professor by the college to continue directing the choir. After Wagnild received a master's degree from New York University in 1948, a music department was established at Gettysburg College with Wagnild as the chair. He received an honorary doctorate of music from Thiel College in 1972, as well as an honorary doctorate of divinity from Gettysburg College.

Today, Gettysburg College is home to the Sunderman Conservatory of Music, which was established in 2006. Sunderman bequeathed $14 million, a large library of scores and parts, and a collection of 18th and 19th century violins and bows to Gettysburg College.

The Sunderman Conservatory of Music offers a Bachelor of Arts in music and a Bachelor of Music in Performance with tracks for Voice, Keyboard, Strings, and Winds/Percussion. The conservatory also offers a Bachelor of Music Education with students completing all requisite classes in seven semesters and teaching in their eighth.

Major ensembles include a Symphony Orchestra, a Wind Symphony and the College Choir. Students can also perform in the jazz band, jazz combo, as well as numerous chamber ensembles. The Bullets Marching Band, and ensemble of 100-120 student from within and outside the conservatory, performs every fall at home football games, and is routinely selected to perform as a part of the Collegiate Marching Band Festival in Allentown, PA. Students in these ensembles have opportunities to perform within the conservatory, throughout the college, and abroad with major ensembles touring nationally and internationally.

Performance venues for the Sunderman Conservatory include Paul Recital Hall in Schmucker Hall; Christ Chapel, the college's center for religious and spiritual life; and the Majestic Theater, an 816-seat theater renovated in 2004–2005 that serves as the conservatory's main performance venue.

=== Greek organizations ===
There are several fraternities and sororities on campus. Starting in the 2025–26 school year, freshmen are allowed to rush in the spring semester. Previously, students could only rush as sophomores. Around a third of all students are involved in some form of Greek life, and around half of eligible students are involved in Greek life.

=== Student newspapers ===
The Gettysburgian has been the school's main student newspaper since 1897. Since 2012 the Civil War Institute at Gettysburg College has maintained a student newspaper, The Gettysburg Compiler, for publishing reports on the American Civil War, interviews with professionals in the field, and other developments in the study of the Civil War. The college has acknowledged and archived the newspaper, but refers to it as a "scholarly blog." The newspaper is named after the historic Civil War era newspaper, The Compiler, which operated from 1866 until it shut down on July 1, 1961, under the name The Gettysburg Compiler.

== Activities and traditions ==
The college boasts a wide variety of different events on campus, with an estimated 3,200 cultural events occurring during a four-year period.

=== Activities ===
There are more than 120 clubs and organizations on campus, focusing on areas of interest such as community service, art and music, theater and media, academics, student government, career fields, LGBTQA and outdoor adventure. These provide students with over 1,000 leadership opportunities each year, in addition to trips to surrounding metropolitan areas.

There are resources for Jewish, Buddhist, Christian, Muslim, atheist, and Hindu students. The college provides nondenominational worship in the campus chapel and Glatfelter Lodge, and various resources for religious holidays.

==== First Year Walk ====
On November 19, 1863, students marched through town to the National Cemetery to hear President Abraham Lincoln deliver his now famous Gettysburg Address. In 2003, Peter Holloran, a Gettysburg graduate and marketing consultant to the college proposed recreating the walk to promote community among students and the town. The Orientation Chair at the time, Lindsay Morlock, saw the walk as an opportunity to encourage new students to step "off campus from day one" and "acknowledge the history of Gettysburg College". Since the first walk on August 28, 2003, first year students have marched along the same one-mile path to be welcomed into town and hear the same words spoken over a century ago. Faculty, students, and townspeople cheer the arriving first-years along their walk as the main streets of town shut down to participate.

==== Twilight hour ====
Upon completion of the first semester, first-year students walk from the college union building to Pennsylvania Hall along paths illuminated by upperclassmen holding candles. Initially known as the Twilight Walk, the name was changed to Twilight Hour for the class of 2020 in 2017. The tradition is designed to welcome first-year students into alumni status, and involves the passing of a Class Book to the college president and the singing of the college's alma mater. The tradition was discontinued in 2019 by the college's Office of Student Activities and Greek Life.

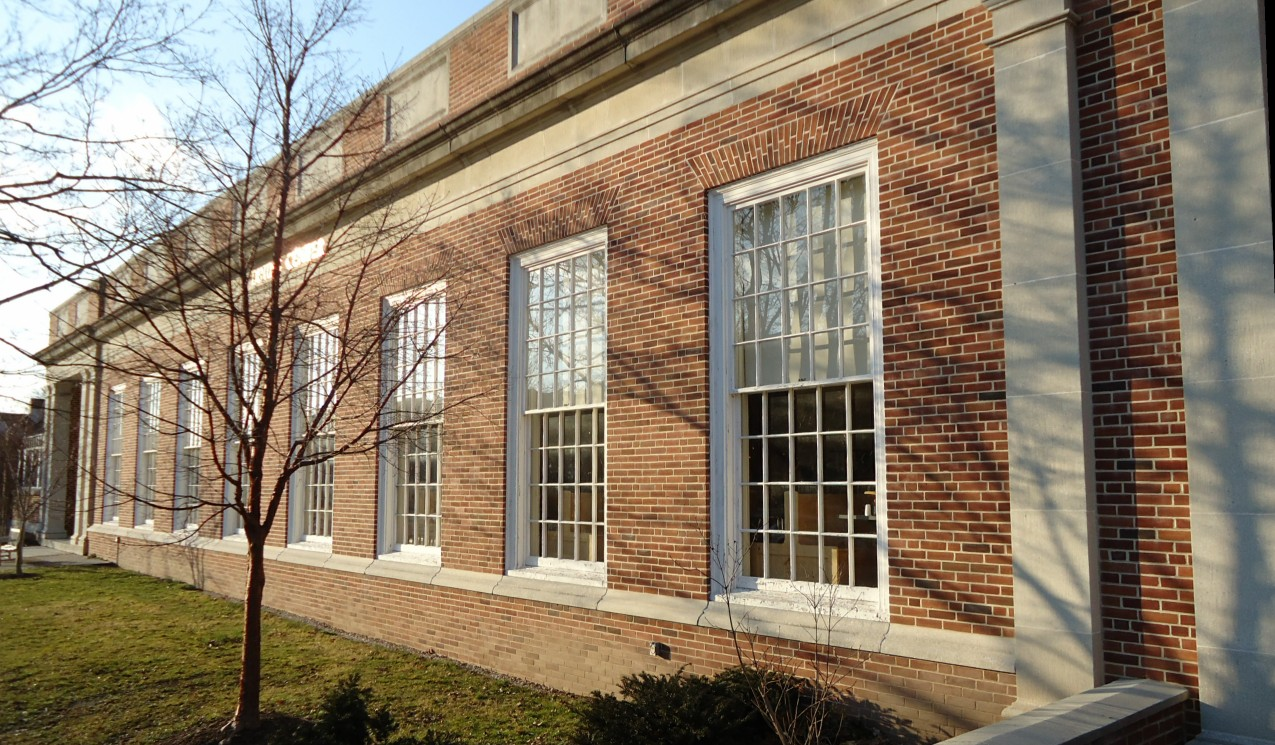
Servo, the primary dining hall of campus

==== "Servo Thanksgiving" ====
The week before Thanksgiving the dining center opens to serve a family-style traditional Thanksgiving meal. Students receive unlimited turkey, mashed potatoes, stuffing, pumpkin pie, and more, served by professors and administrators.

==== Springfest ====
On the weekend before finals, the college hosts a well-known musician who performs on the shores of Stine Lake.

== Athletics ==
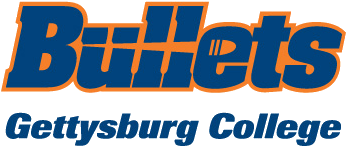
Gettysburg Bullets logo

Gettysburg offers 24 sports programs for both men and women in the Centennial Conference of the NCAA Division III.

About a quarter of Gettysburg's students participate in intercollegiate programs, which include twelve sports for men and twelve sports for women. Although the mascot for Gettysburg College is the Bullet, there is no official Bullet mascot at sporting events. In 2014, 1000 to 1: The Cory Weissman Story was filmed at Gettysburg College. Cory Weissman was a student-athlete who had a stroke before his freshman basketball season.

In September 2024, the school faced controversy after a non-white member of the men's swimming team had a racial slur cut into his chest by a teammate.

== Notable alumni ==
=== Government ===
- Paul Barbadoro, judge on the United States District Court for the District of New Hampshire, Chief Judge of the District of New Hampshire (1997–2004)
- James Glenn Beall, U.S. senator from Maryland
- Carol Bellamy, former New York City Council president and former executive director, UNICEF
- J. Hay Brown, justice of the Supreme Court of Pennsylvania (1899-1915), chief justice (1915-1921)
- Alice J. Cain, former Maryland delegate
- Michael A. Chagares, judge on the United States Court of Appeals for the Third Circuit
- Nathaniel N. Craley, Jr., former US representative from Pennsylvania (1965–1967)
- Fred F. Fielding, former counsel to the president (1981–1986, 2007–2009), former deputy to the White House counsel (1970–1972); member of the 9/11 Commission
- Bruce S. Gordon, former head of the NAACP (2005–2007)
- John Andrew Hiestand, U.S. representative for Pennsylvania's ninth district (1885–1889)
- Pam Iovino, current Pennsylvania state senator
- George M. Leader, 36th governor of Pennsylvania (1955–1959)
- William N. McNair, 49th mayor of Pittsburgh (1934–1936)
- Ron Paul, M.D., U.S. representative from Texas; 1988 Libertarian Party presidential nominee; 2008 and 2012 candidate for the Republican Party presidential nomination
- Jeffrey Piccola, Pennsylvania state senator, former State Senate majority whip (2001–2007)
- John S. Rice, former US Ambassador to the Netherlands (1961–1964)
- Jay Ruais, mayor of Manchester, New Hampshire (2024-present)
- Doug Steinhardt (1991), New Jersey state senator, former chairman of the New Jersey State Republican Party

=== Arts and entertainment ===
- Jen Bryant, poet and author
- Bill Fleischman, sports journalist and professor
- Jackson C. Frank, folk musician
- Carson Kressley, fashion consultant, Queer Eye for the Straight Guy
- Owen Roizman, filmmaker
- Stephanie Sellars, writer, actor, and filmmaker
- Karen Sosnoski, author, radio contributor and filmmaker
- Jerry Spinelli, author
- Puru Raaj Kumar, actor

=== Academia ===
- Mary Carskadon, Professor of Psychiatry and Human Behavior at the Warren Alpert Medical School of Brown University
- Arthur Byron Coble, mathematician, Professor at Johns Hopkins University and the University of Illinois, President of the American Mathematical Society
- Luther P. Eisenhart, mathematician, Professor and Chair of the Mathematics Department at Princeton University, later served as Dean of the Graduate School at Princeton
- Luther Alexander Gotwald
- Ruth J. Person, Chancellor of the University of Michigan (Flint Campus)
- Janet Morgan Riggs, President of Gettysburg College (2009–2019)
- Neal Smatresk, academic research biologist, President of the University of North Texas, Denton
- Edgar Fahs Smith, scientist, awarded the Priestley Medal, Provost of the University of Pennsylvania
- William Swann, Professor of Social and Personality Psychology at the University of Texas at Austin

=== Science ===
- J. Michael Bishop, 1989 Nobel Laureate in Medicine for cancer research
- Moncef Slaoui, Moroccan-born Belgian-American researcher and manager of Operation Warp Speed, the U.S. government's development of vaccines to treat coronavirus disease
- Nolan R. Walborn, astronomer who worked on hot, massive stars and their classification
- John Bosley Ziegler, physician who discovered Dianabol and pioneered the use of steroids in sport

=== Athletics ===
- Jon Anik, ESPN anchor, UFC play-by-play announcer
- Harry O'Neill, one of two Major League Baseball players to die during World War II
- "Gettysburg Eddie" Plank, former Major League Baseball player, member of the National Baseball Hall of Fame. Never actually attended Gettysburg College as a student, but played on the baseball team by being affiliated with Gettysburg Academy.
- George Winter, former Major League Baseball player
- John Yovicsin, NFL football player, coach at Gettysburg, and coach at Harvard

=== Military ===
- Flora D. Darpino, first female Judge Advocate General of the United States Army
- Stanton R. Musser, Major general, United States Air Force
- Keller E. Rockey, Lieutenant general, United States Marine Corps, commander of the 5th Marine Division during the Battle of Iwo Jima
- Charles A. Willoughby, Chief of Intelligence on General Douglas MacArthur's staff during World War II and the Korean War; member of Military Intelligence Hall of Fame

== Notable faculty ==
- Michael Birkner, professor of history, 1989 to 2025
- Peter Carmichael, professor, civil war historian, and former director of the Civil War Institute.
- William Culp Darrah, professor of biology
- Christopher Fee, English professor and medievalist.
- J. Matthew Gallman, Henry R. Luce professor of the Civil War Era, 1998 to 2003
- Carl Hanson, President, 1961 to 1977
- Herman Haupt, American Civil War general who ran the Union military railroad system
- Felix Hell, organist, Adjunct Assistant Professor of Organ
- Charles Philip Krauth, President, 1834 to 1850
- Alfred M. Mayer, professor of physics, 1865 to 1868
- Willard Stewart Paul, President, 1956 to 1961
- William Morton Reynolds, professor of Latin, 1832 to 1850
- Maggie Smith, poet, freelance writer, and editor
- Robert Iuliano, president of the college since 2019

== Gallery ==
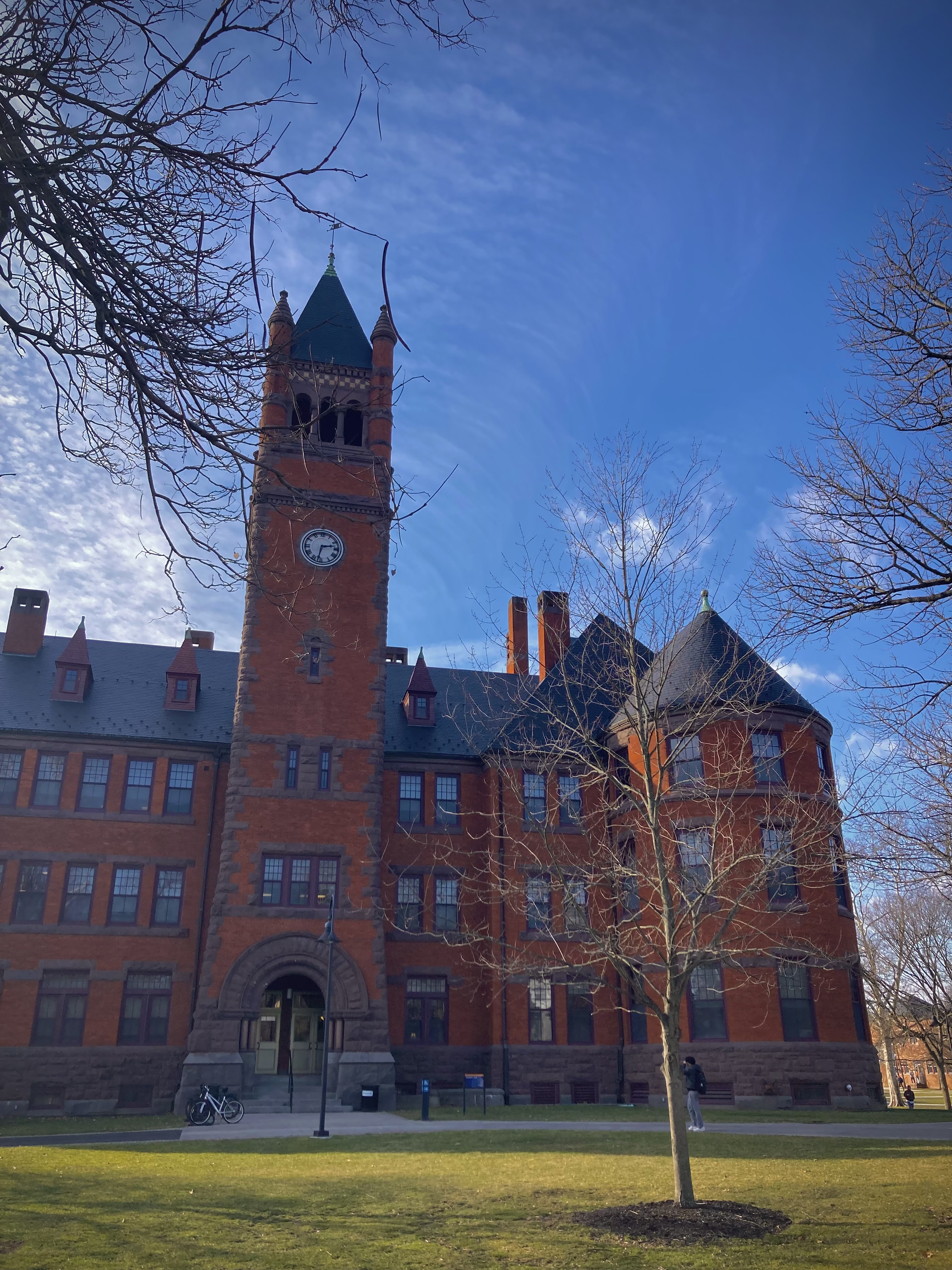
Front view of Glatfelter Hall

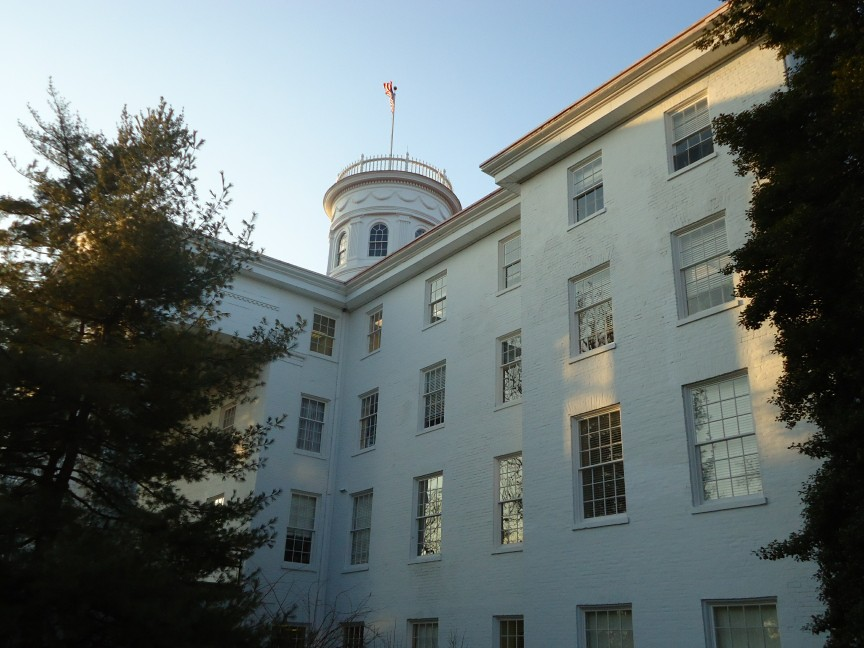
Pennsylvania Hall

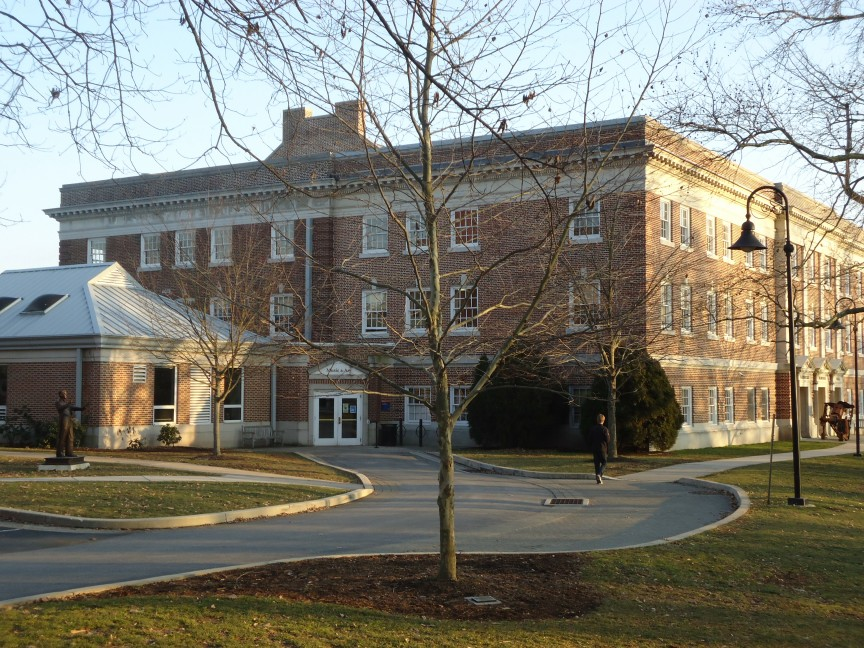
Schmucker Hall

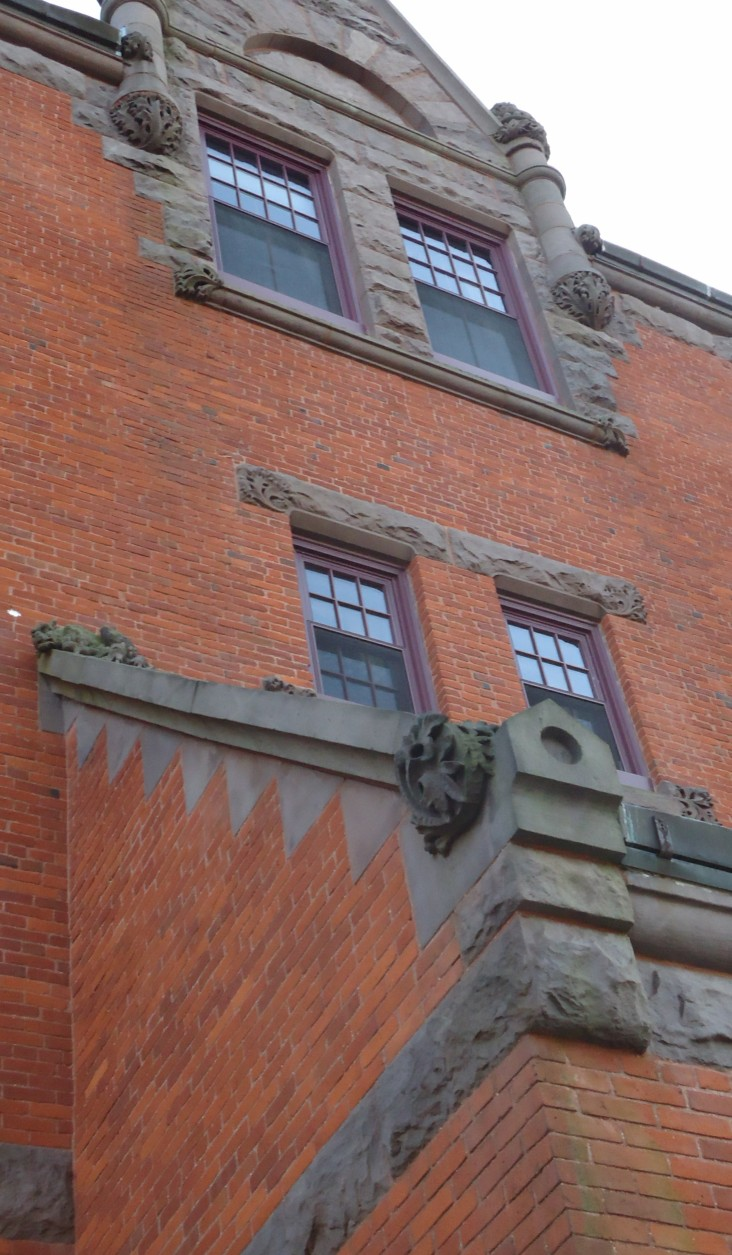

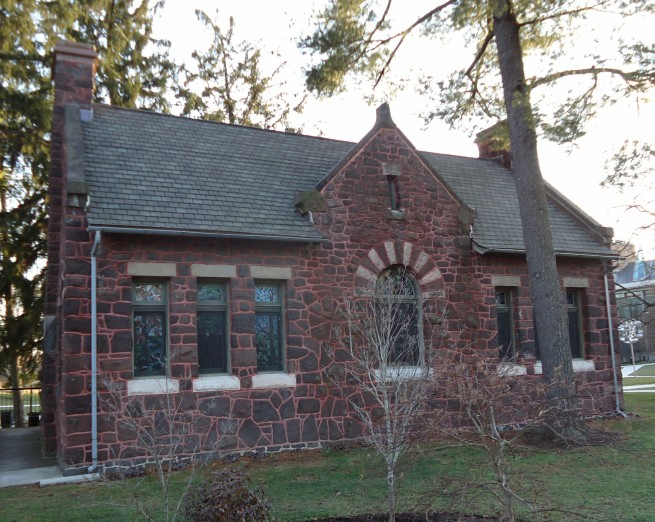
Glatfelter Lodge

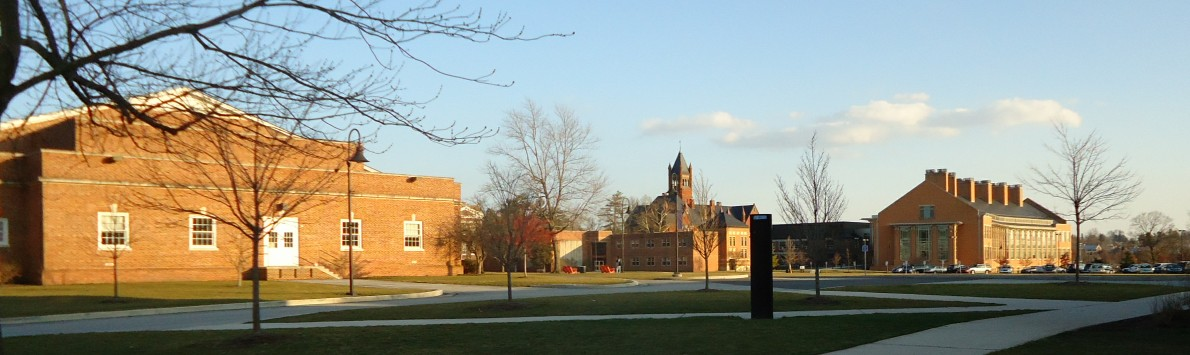
View from Lincoln Street

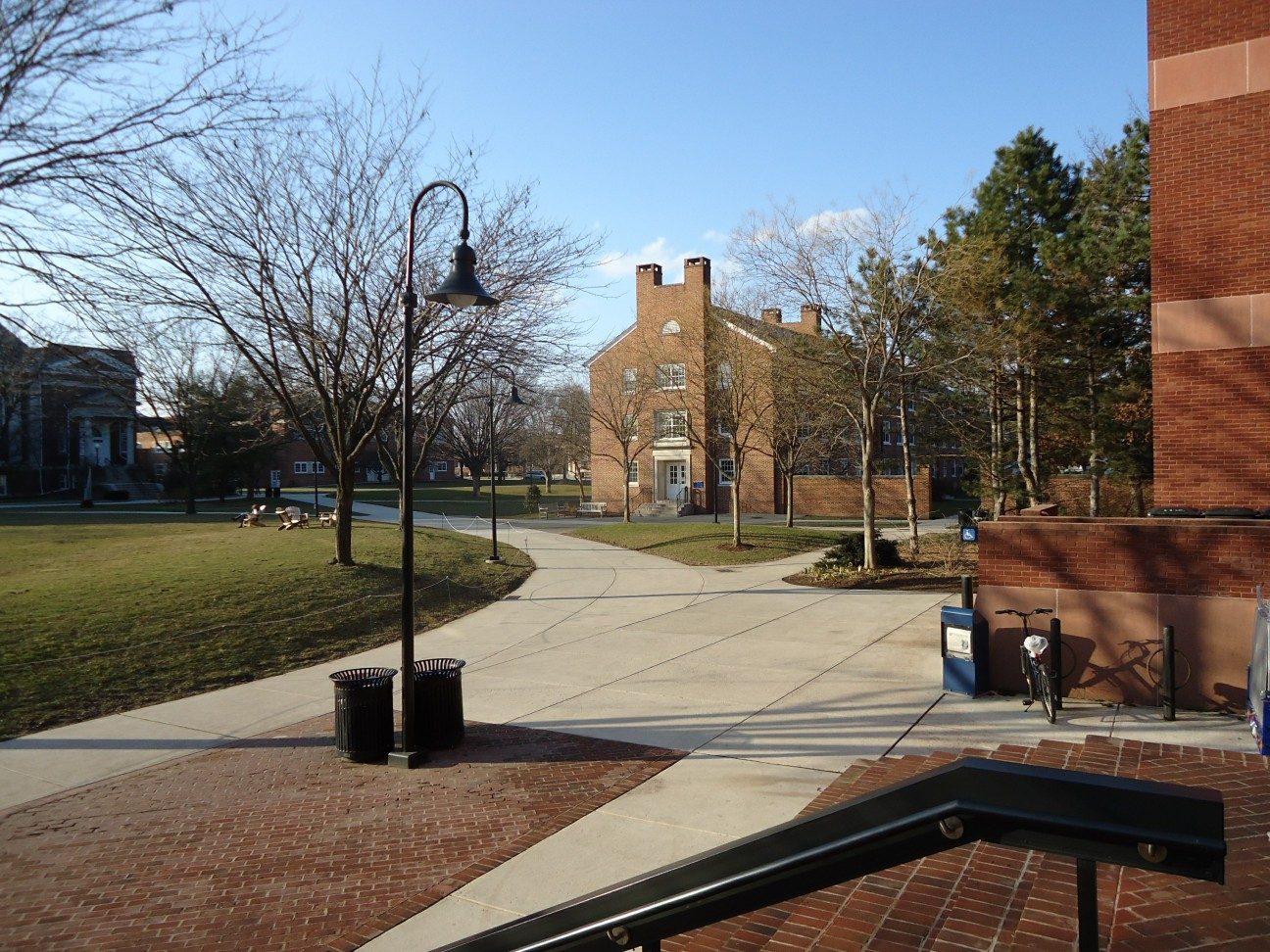

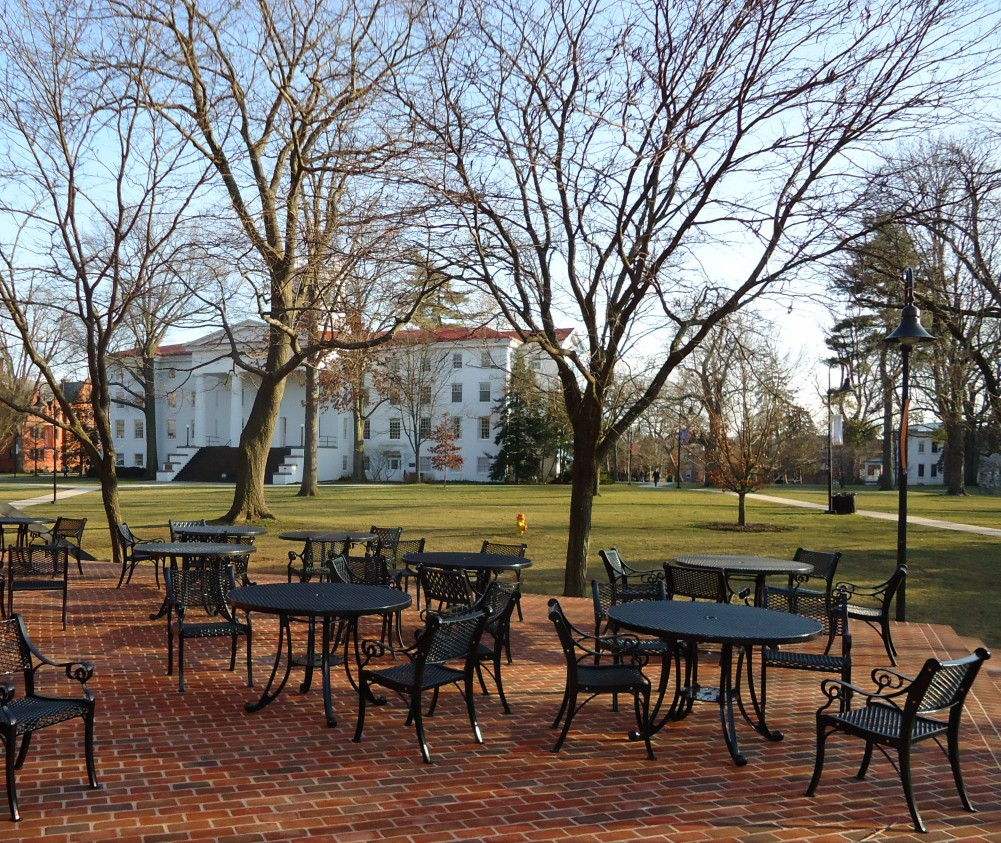
Pennsylvania Hall, from Musselman Library

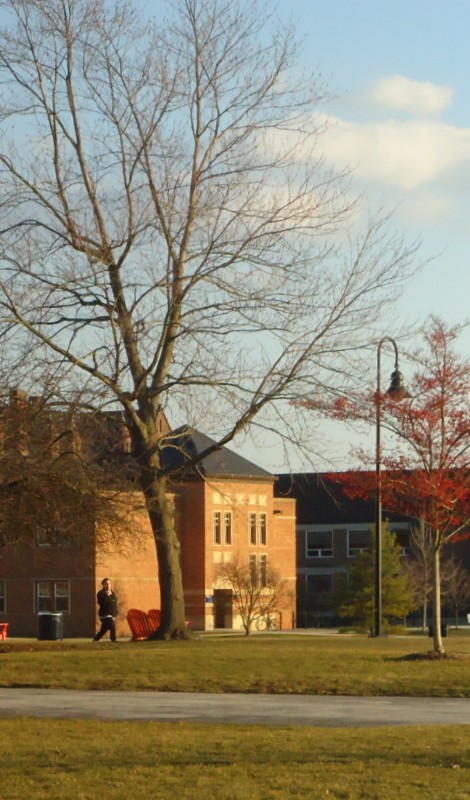

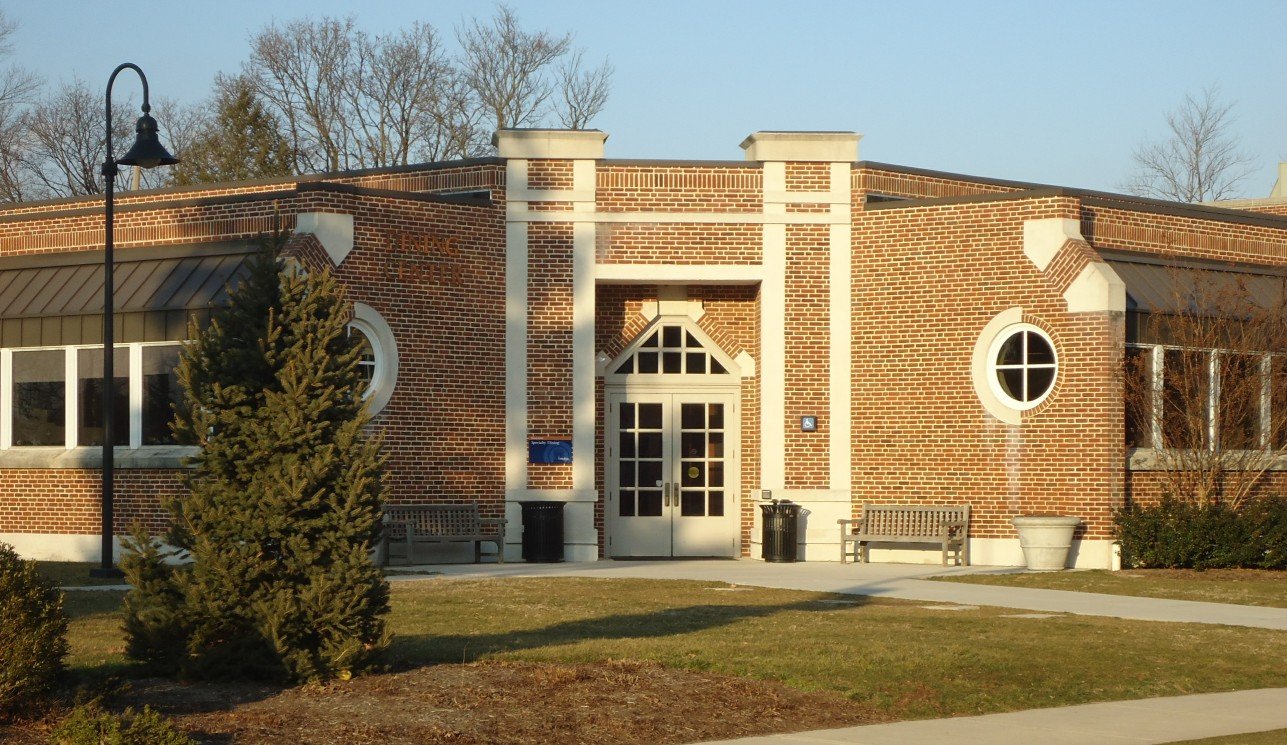
Dining Center ("Servo")

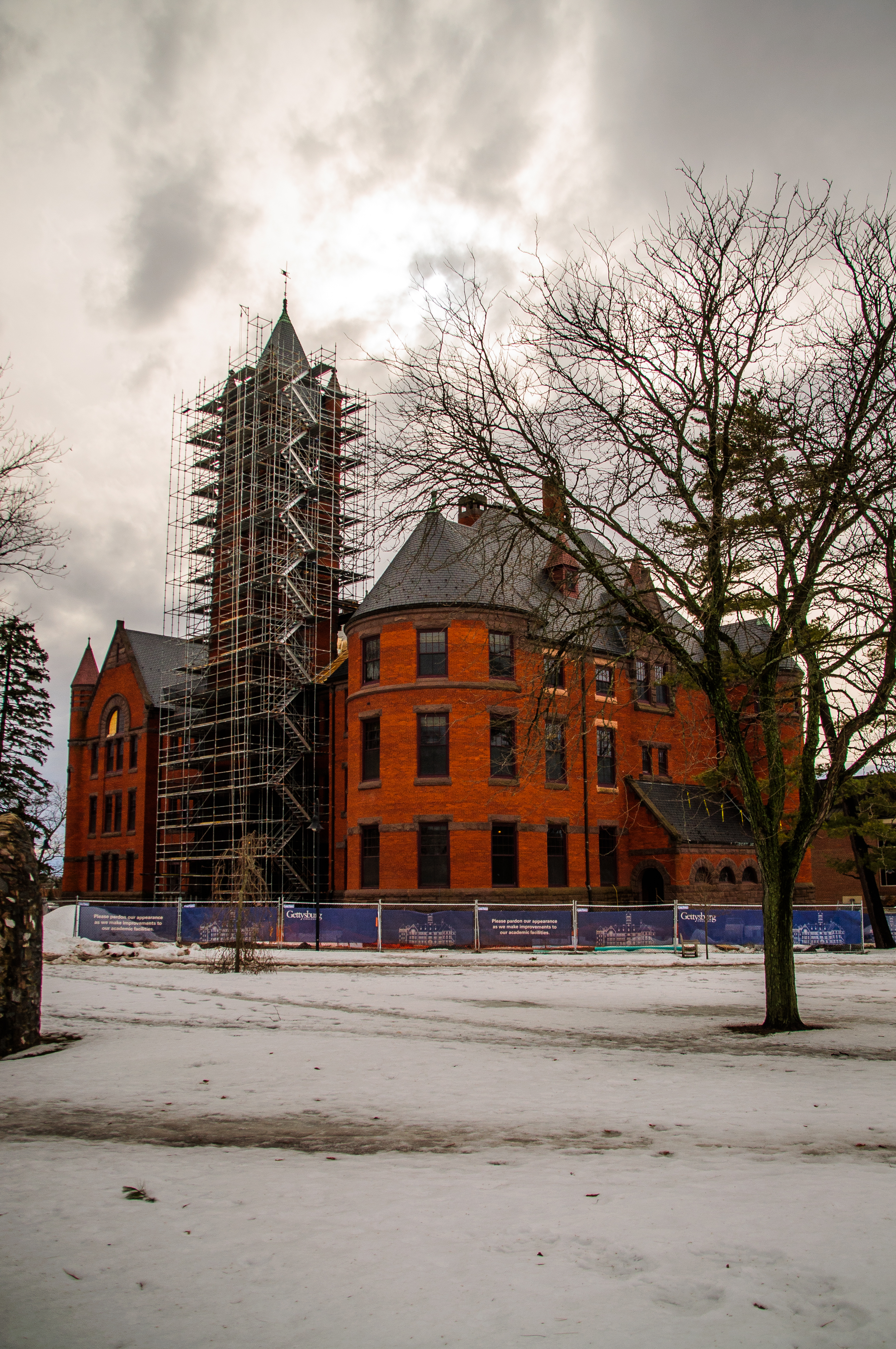
Glatfelter hall during the renovation in the winter of 2014

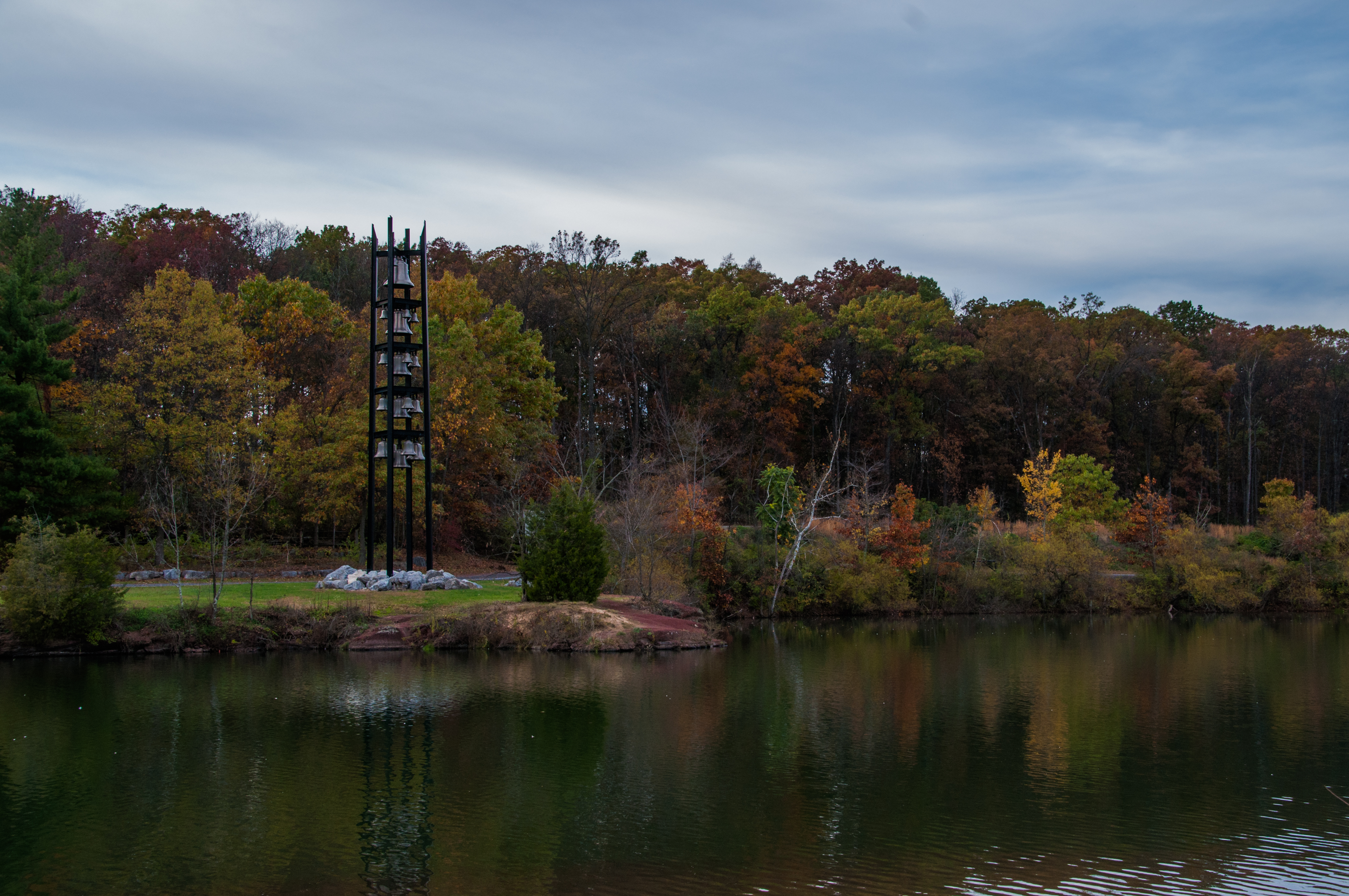
The Quarry Pond on campus

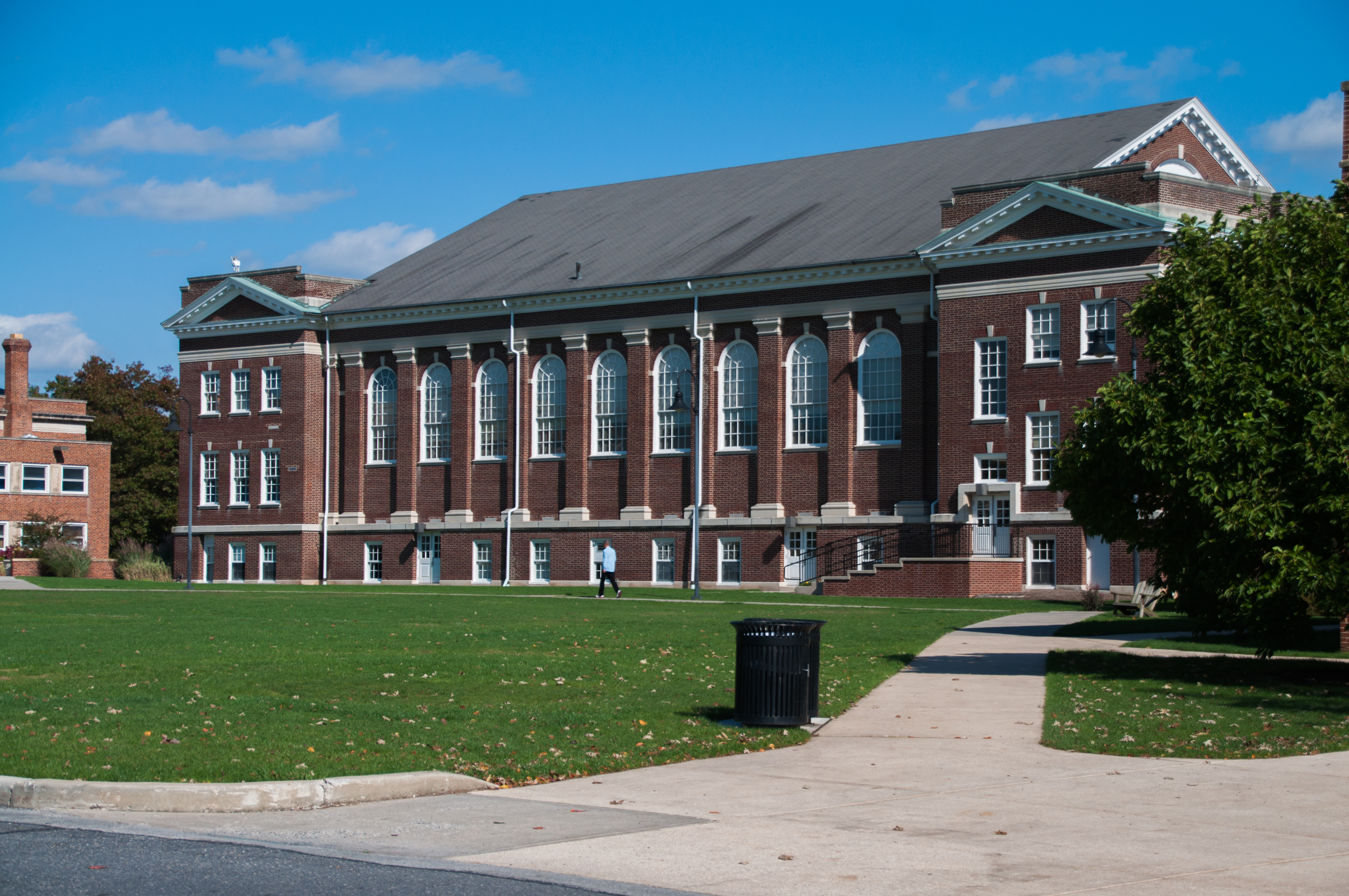
Plank Gym, home to the radio station, yearbook, Anthropology department, and GRAB offices

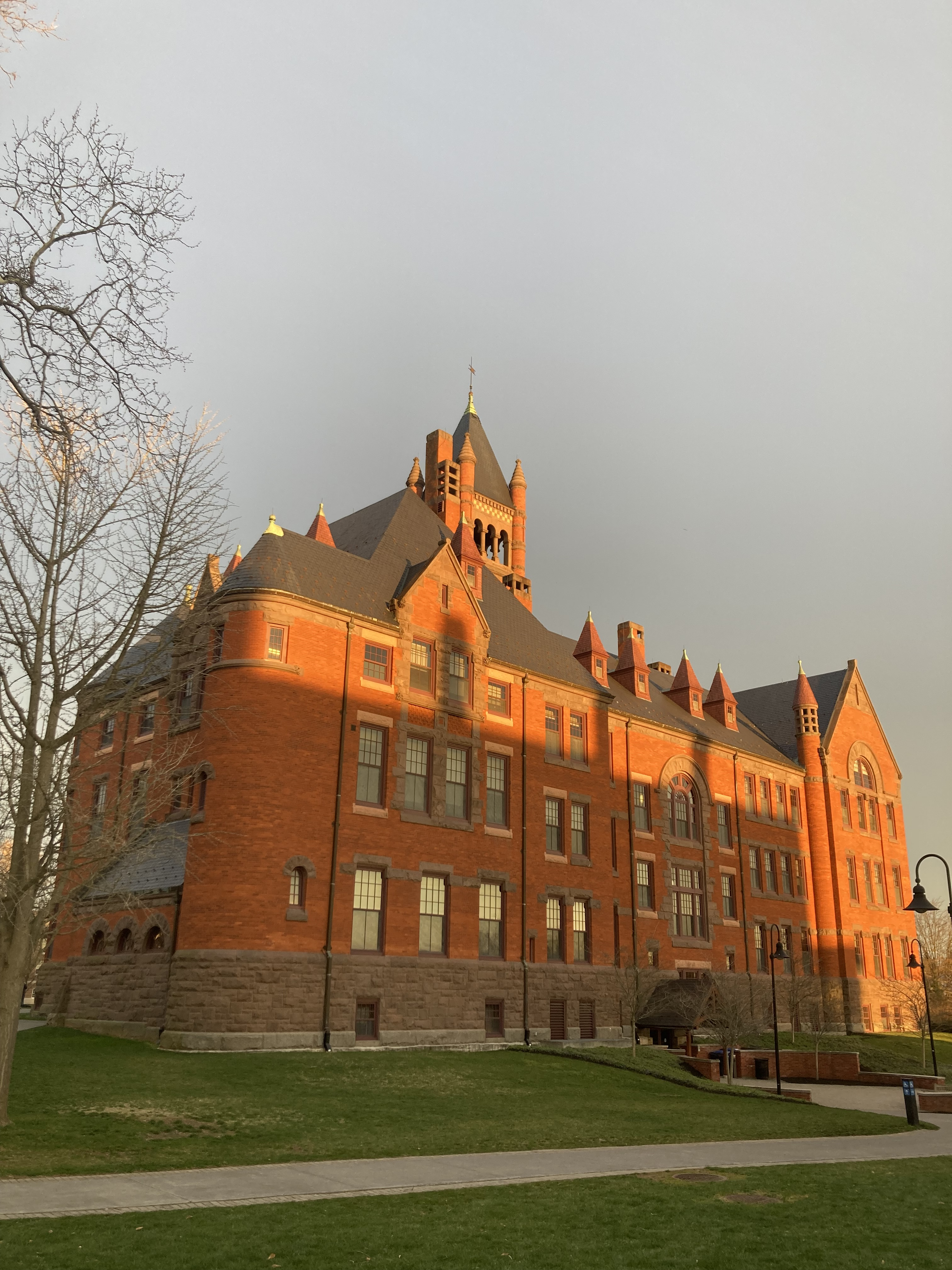
Back view of Glatfelter Hall

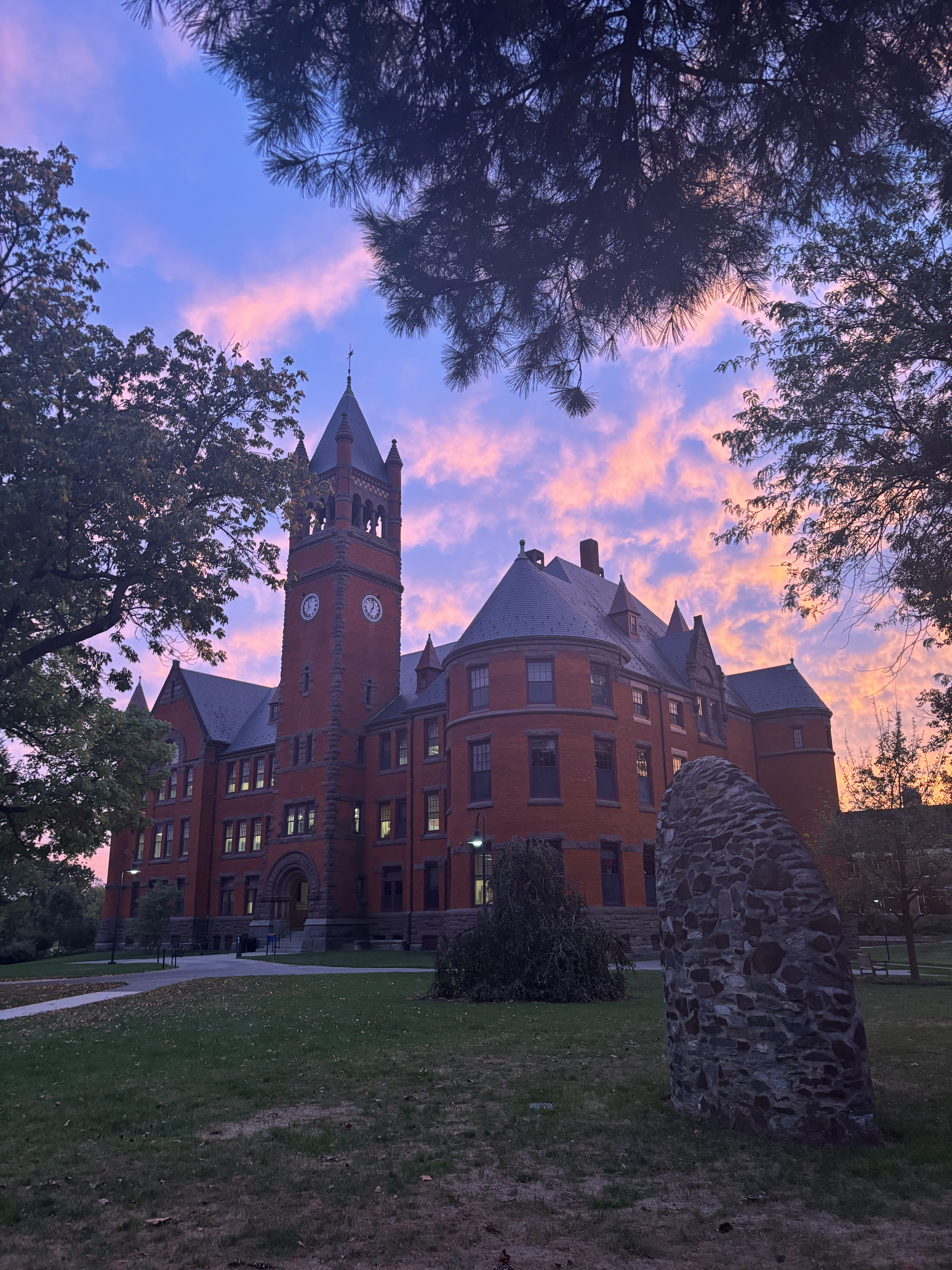
Glatfelter Hall at sunset

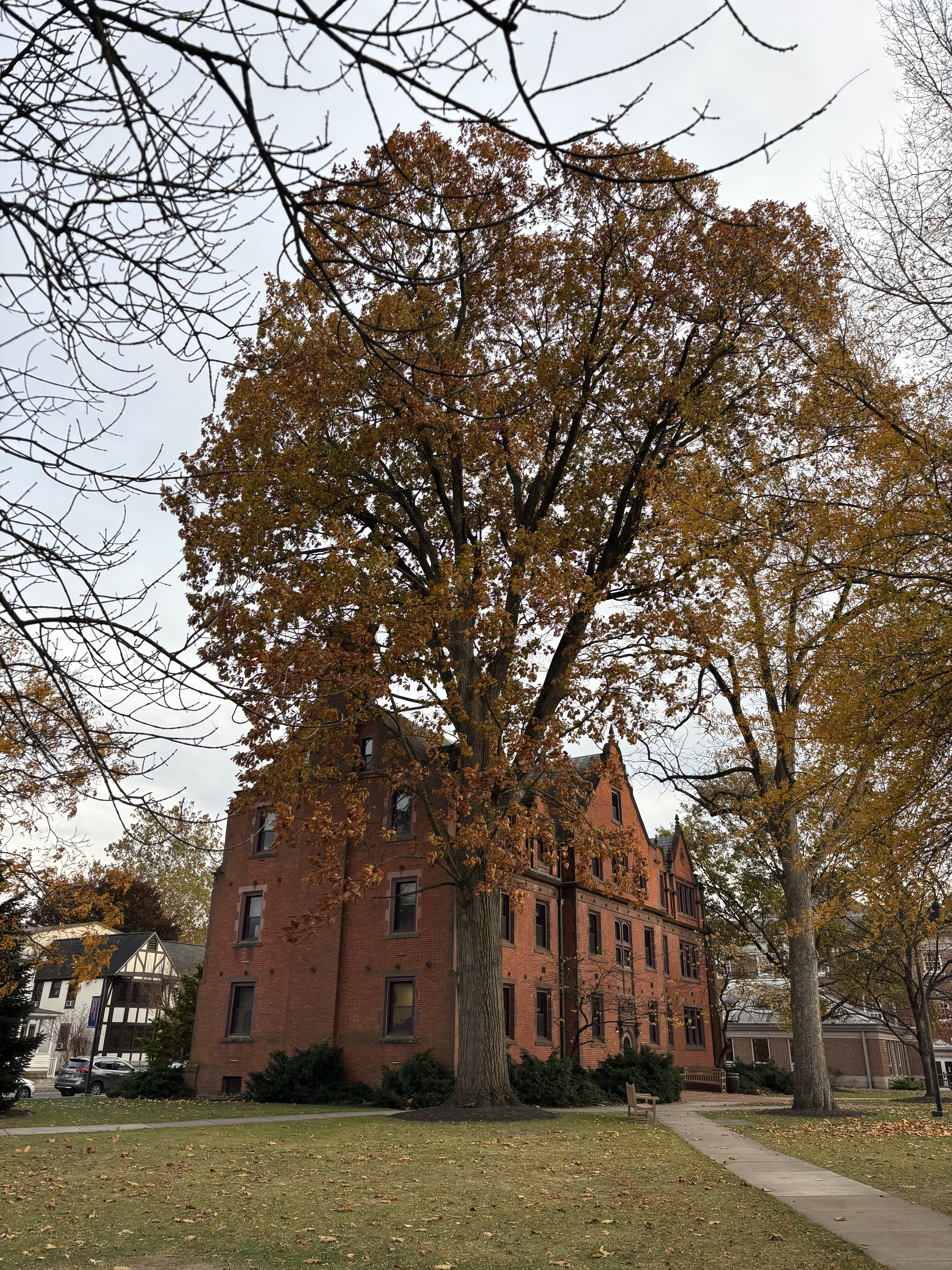
McKnight Hall in the fall
