= Stanton R. Musser =

United States Air Force officer (1936–2012)

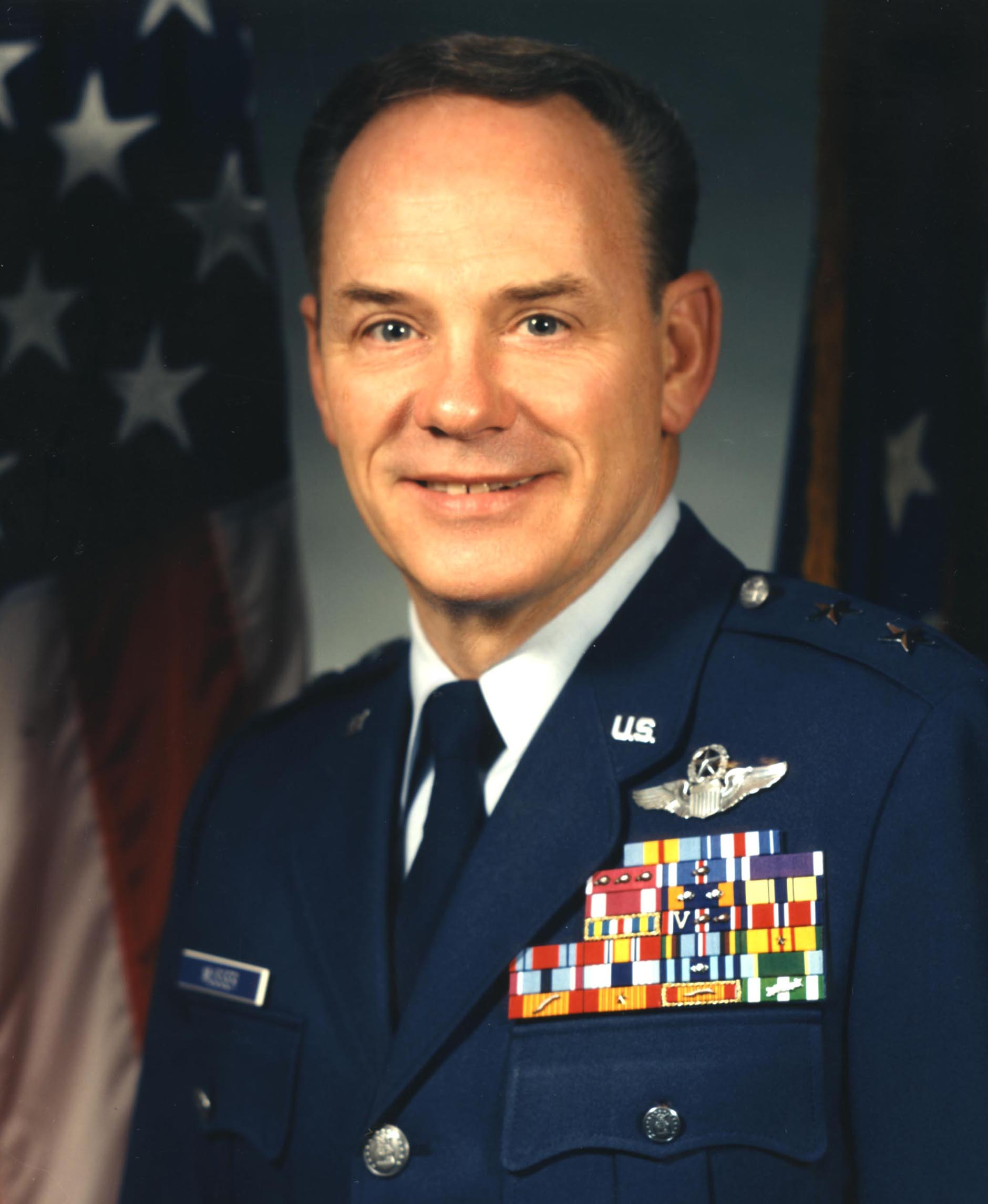
- Born: 2 April 1936; Watsontown, Pennsylvania, U.S.
- Died: 8 October 2012 (aged 76); Blacksburg, Virginia, U.S.
- Burial place: Arlington National Cemetery
- Military career
- Allegiance: United States of America
- Branch: United States Air Force
- Service years: 1958–1989
- Rank: Major general
- Commands: 602nd Tactical Air Control Wing; 33rd Tactical Fighter Wing; Air Force Inspection and Safety Center
- Conflicts: Vietnam War
- Awards: Defense Distinguished Service Medal; Silver Star; Legion of Merit (4); Distinguished Flying Cross (2); Purple Heart; Meritorious Service Medal; Air Medal (11); Air Force Commendation Medal

Major general Stanton R. Musser (2 April 1936 – 8 October 2012) was a United States Air Force (USAF) officer.

== Early life and education ==
Musser was born to Marjorie May and Harold L. Musser in Watsontown, Pennsylvania on 2 April 1936. He attended Gettysburg High School. He earned a bachelor of science degree in physical education from Gettysburg College in 1958. Musser was a sprinter, hurdler and an end in gridiron football. In 2002, he was inducted into the Athletic Hall of Honors of Gettysburg College and Adams County.

== Military career ==
Musser was commissioned as a second lieutenant through the Air Force Reserve Officer Training Corps program and began pilot training at Malden Air Base, Missouri, in August 1958. Upon completion of pilot training at Laredo Air Force Base, Texas, in August 1959, he received his pilot wings. He was then assigned to Williams Air Force Base, Arizona, and later to Nellis Air Force Base, Nevada, where he completed North American F-100 Super Sabre combat crew training in July 1960. After survival school training at Stead Air Force Base, Nevada, in September 1960, he was assigned to the 417th Tactical Fighter Squadron, 50th Tactical Fighter Wing, located at Ramstein Air Base in West Germany, as an F-100 fighter-bomber aircraft commander. In July 1964 Musser was assigned to the 31st Tactical Fighter Wing, Homestead Air Force Base, Florida, as an F-100 pilot and later served as chief of wing training and scheduling. During this assignment he served a temporary tour of duty in South Vietnam as a forward air controller, flying 177 combat missions in Cessna O-1F Bird Dogs with "A" Brigade, Army of the Republic of Vietnam. He completed Squadron Officer School in 1964.

He transferred to the U.S. Air Force Academy, Colorado, as an air officer commanding in April 1966. He was assigned to the U.S. Air Force Aerial Demonstration Squadron, the Thunderbirds, at Nellis Air Force Base in December 1966. He flew with the Thunderbirds when the team changed from F-100s to McDonnell Douglas F-4E Phantom IIs in 1969. During his time as a team member, he flew more than 300 official aerial demonstrations in the United States and 20 foreign countries.

Musser returned to Southeast Asia in May 1970 and flew F-4Es as assistant operations officer, 469th Tactical Fighter Squadron, and later as assistant deputy commander for operations, 388th Tactical Fighter Wing, Korat Royal Thai Air Force Base, Thailand. During this tour of duty, he completed another 86 combat missions. From January 1971 to August 1973, Musser was assigned to Headquarters U.S. Air Force, Washington, D.C., as chief of the Tactics Branch, Tactical Forces Division, Directorate of Operations. After graduating from the Industrial College of the Armed Forces in July 1974, he became assistant deputy commander for operations, 4th Tactical Fighter Wing, Seymour Johnson Air Force Base, North Carolina, again flying F-4Es. He returned to the Air Force Academy in July 1975 as deputy commandant of the Cadet Wing and in March 1977 became vice commandant of cadets. He received a master of arts degree in personnel management from Central Michigan University in 1975.

In October 1977, Musser was appointed vice commander of the first operational McDonnell Douglas F-15 Eagle wing, 1st Tactical Fighter Wing, Langley Air Force Base, Virginia. In 1978 he was named a distinguished alumnus of Gettysburg College. In August 1979 he became commander of the 602nd Tactical Air Control Wing, Bergstrom Air Force Base, Texas. He transferred to Eglin Air Force Base, Florida, in April 1980 as commander of the 33rd Tactical Fighter Wing.

Musser was appointed vice commander of the Ogden Air Logistics Center, Hill Air Force Base, Utah, in February 1982. He completed the program for senior executives in National and International Security at the John F. Kennedy School of Government, Harvard University, in 1982. In July 1983 he became chief, Office of Military Cooperation, Cairo, Egypt, where he also served as the senior military adviser to the ambassador. He was promoted to major general on 1 June 1985, with date of rank of 1 June 1981. From July 1985 to July 1986 he was assigned as assistant deputy chief of staff for logistics and engineering at Air Force headquarters. He then served as deputy director of the Defense Logistics Agency, Cameron Station, Virginia. He assumed command of the Air Force Inspection and Safety Center, Norton Air Force Base, California in September 1987. He retired from the USAF on 1 September 1989. He was a command pilot with more than 4,500 flying hours, primarily on F-4s, F-15s and F-100s. Musser was a member of the Military Advisory Council for the Mitt Romney 2012 presidential campaign.

== Later life ==
Musser served as Commandant of the Virginia Tech Corps of Cadets for ten years. He died on 8 October 2012 in Blacksburg, Virginia; and was survived by his wife, three children and six grandchildren. He was buried at Arlington National Cemetery.

== Decorations ==
His military decorations and awards include the Defense Distinguished Service Medal, Silver Star, Legion of Merit with three oak leaf clusters, Distinguished Flying Cross with oak leaf cluster, Purple Heart, Meritorious Service Medal, Air Medal with 10 oak leaf clusters and Air Force Commendation Medal.
