= William Culp Darrah =

American scientist and historian (1909–1989)

William Culp Darrah (1909 – 1989) was an American professor of biology at Gettysburg College in Pennsylvania. He also had an interest in, and published several works on, 19th-century photography.

Born in Reading, Pennsylvania, his was a specialist in paleobotany. Darrah was a fellow of the American Association for the Advancement of Science, as well a member of Sigma Xi and the Botanical Society of America.

As an authority on the history of photography, he authored several books about 19th-century photo processes and photographers. As part of his interest in early photography, he assembled a collection of over 60,000 cartes-de-visite, which is now held at Penn State University.

He died in Gettysburg, Pennsylvania.

== Selected bibliography ==
=== Biology ===
- Principles of paleobotany (1960)
- Textbook of paleobotany (1939)
- A critical review of the upper Pennsylvanian floras of eastern United States with notes on the Mazon Creek flora of Illinois (1969)

=== Photography ===
- Stereo views, a history of stereographs in America and their collection (1964)
- A check list of Maine photographers who issued stereographs (1967)
- An Album of stereographs : or, Our country victorious and now a happy home : from the collections of William Culp Darrah and Richard Russack (1977)
- The world of stereographs (1977)
- Cartes de visite in nin[e]teenth century photography (1981)
