= Carl Hanson =

American academic (1913–1983)

Carl Arnold Hanson

10th President of Gettysburg College
- In office 1961–1977
- Preceded by: Henry W. A. Hanson
- Succeeded by: Robert I. Maxwell

Dean of faculty at Cornell University
- In office 1957–1961

Personal details
- Born: 1913
- Died: 1983 (aged 69–70)
- Education: University of Akron; University of Chicago; Cornell University
- Occupation: Scholar, college administrator

Carl Arnold Hanson (1913–1983) was an American scholar in industrial and labor relations and college administrator who served as dean of faculty at Cornell University from 1957 to 1961 and as 10th president of Gettysburg College from 1961 to 1977.

== Biography ==
Hanson, an Ohio native, was born the son of working-class Swedish immigrants. While attending the University of Akron, he worked full-time as production worker, then as supervisor, for B.F. Goodrich and Company. It took him nine years to earn his B.A. degree. Upon his graduation in 1939, he was employed by the University of Akron as Assistant Adviser of Men and later as the Assistant to the Director of Adult Education.

He left Akron in 1942 to pursue graduate studies at the University of Chicago, but his studies were interrupted because of his service as executive officer of a minesweeper in the U.S. Navy during World War II in the Pacific.

He enrolled in Cornell University's newly established program of industrial and labor relations (ILR) in 1945 and was awarded its first Ph.D. degree in 1948. Upon receiving his doctorate he joined the Cornell University School of Industrial and Labor Relations faculty. In 1949, he was named director of the School's Office of Resident Instruction, graduate field representative, and professor. He served as dean of faculty from 1957 to 1961.

In 1961, he was named as president of Gettysburg College. He served in that capacity until 1977 due to a series of health problems. He died in 1983.
