= Pennsylvania Historical Association =

- Formation: 1932
- Headquarters: 216 Pinecrest, Mansfield University, Mansfield, Pennsylvania 16933
- President: Rachel A. Batch, PhD
- Website: http://www.pa-history.org/

The Pennsylvania Historical Association (PHA), founded in 1932, is a non-profit volunteer organization committed to promoting interest in Pennsylvania and Mid-Atlantic history. It publishes a journal, Pennsylvania History: A Journal of Mid-Atlantic Studies, as well as the Pennsylvania History Studies Series, which provides succinct overviews of themes and issues in Pennsylvania history. With support from the Pennsylvania Historical and Museum Commission, the PHA holds an annual meeting in a different Pennsylvania location each fall and joins other organizations in sponsoring history programming such as Pennsylvania History Day and ExplorePAHistory.com.

== History ==
The PHA was born of a conversation between historians Roy F. Nichols and Lawrence Henry Gipson at the 1928 annual meeting of the American Historical Association (AHA). Nichols had developed an interest in doing local history, which he offered as a solution to concerns within the AHA that historians outside of large cities lacked the resources to undertake serious research. Nichols joined with Gipson and others to imagine an organization that, unlike its peers—which included the Historical Society of Pennsylvania (1824), the Pennsylvania Federation of Historical Societies (1905), and the Pennsylvania Historical Commission (1913)--would serve all commonwealth historians while remaining independent of institutional and geographic affiliations. In following years, an emergent nationwide interest in regionalism spawned by the New Deal's various cultural programs encouraged a receptive audience in Pennsylvania for Nichols' idea. Several meetings in and around State College, PA during 1932 laid the groundwork for an organizational constitution and planning for the PHA's first annual meeting, which convened in Bethlehem, PA at Lehigh University in 1933.

Since its beginnings, the PHA has played a formative role in generating scholarship on Pennsylvania history and shaping archival collections throughout the commonwealth. At the time of its 75th-anniversary commemorations, PHA membership counted 800, including historians, teachers, and others with an interest in Pennsylvania history, and a wide variety of organizations including college and university libraries; secondary schools; public libraries (both state and local); research libraries, historic sites, and museums. Annual 3-day PHA conferences continue to be held at different locations throughout the state, featuring new research on topics in Pennsylvania history, and visits to historic sites of interest.

== Mission ==
"The purpose of the Pennsylvania Historical Association shall be to promote interest in, reading of, or study of Pennsylvania history, especially as it relates to the larger context of American and world history. To achieve this purpose, the association shall engage in a variety of pertinent activities, including publishing materials and holding meetings of a scholarly nature."

== Pennsylvania History: A Journal of Mid-Atlantic Studies ==
Pennsylvania History: A Journal of Mid-Atlantic Studies is a quarterly journal that publishes the best of current scholarship on the history of the commonwealth and the region. In addition to regular articles, the journal features annotated documents, book reviews, and reviews of museum exhibits, films, and historical collections. Published since 1934, Pennsylvania History is the official journal of the PHA. All back issues of the journal—beginning with Vol. 1 (1934) and continuing up through Vol. 72 (2005)--are freely available.

== See also ==
- List of historical societies in Pennsylvania
