= Irvin S. Schonfeld =

American psychologist and academic

Irvin Sam Schonfeld
- Born: Brooklyn, New York, United States
- Education: CUNY Graduate Center; Brooklyn College; The New School for Social Research
- Scientific career
- Fields: Psychology
- Workplaces: City College

Irvin Sam Schonfeld is an American psychologist and Professor Emeritus of Psychology at the City College of the City University of New York (CCNY). He also served on the doctoral faculty of the Educational Psychology and Psychology programs at the CUNY Graduate Center and held an appointment in the Department of Epidemiology and Biostatistics at the CUNY School of Public Health. Known for his contributions to occupational health psychology, he has re-examined the construct of burnout and co-developed widely used psychometric instruments for job-related mental health assessment.

He is the recipient of Society for Occupational Health Psychology service award.

== Biography ==
Born and raised in Brooklyn, Schonfeld spent his childhood in the Glenwood Houses, a housing project in the Flatlands section of the borough. His father, George Schonfeld, was a World War II veteran and his mother Ruth (née Berson) Schonfeld, worked part-time in a department store. Schonfeld is related to the writer Dayal Kaur Khalsa (née Marcia Schonfeld) and the expert and dealer in Impressionist paintings, Sam Salz. Schonfeld earned a B.S. in Psychology with a minor in Mathematics from Brooklyn College, and an M.A. in Psychology from The New School for Social Research, which he completed while teaching mathematics in the New York City public schools.

As a student, he was active in anti–Vietnam War and Civil Rights Movements and contributed as a writer for the underground campus newspaper Nova Vanguard. His activism drew the attention of the U.S. Senate’s Subcommittee on Internal Security, which subpoenaed his college records. A letter he had written to The New York Times Magazine was later included in George Kennan’s Democracy and the Student Left.

He then earned his Ph.D. in developmental and educational psychology from the CUNY Graduate Center and completed postdoctoral training in epidemiology at Columbia University’s School of Public Health.

=== Academic career ===
Schonfeld began his academic career in the Department of Psychiatry at Columbia where he served as a Lecturer in Clinical Psychology at Columbia University’s College of Physicians and Surgeons from 1981 to 2010 and briefly as a Research Associate at the New York State Psychiatric Institute. He became an assistant professor in the School of Education at The City College of New York (CCNY), advancing to full professor in 1994.

He subsequently held multiple appointments, including professor in the Department of Psychology at CCNY (2008–2021), Professor of Educational Psychology at the CUNY Graduate Center (1998–2021), Professor of Psychology at the CUNY Graduate Center (2002–2021), and Professor of Epidemiology and Biostatistics at the CUNY School of Public Health (2017–2021). He is currently a professor emeritus at CCNY and the CUNY Graduate Center.

A pivotal phase of Schonfeld’s formation was his post-doctoral fellowship in the Psychiatric Epidemiology Training Program at Columbia University’s School of Public Health (1983–1985), where he was mentored by Bruce P. Dohrenwend; that training catalyzed his shift away from developmental psychology toward research on work, stress, and mental health. In 2006, he founded the Newsletter of the Society for Occupational Health Psychology (serving until 2010) and served on the editorial board of the Journal of Occupational Health Psychology.

== Research ==
Schonfeld is known for his contributions to occupational health psychology, with research spanning several decades and addressing the intersection of work and mental health. His early scholarship examined the psychological impact of job stress on teachers, helping to shape understanding of how job demands affect psychological well-being.

With Joseph Mazzola (Meredith College), Schonfeld wrote about the strengths and limitations of qualitative research. In addition, he and Mazzola used qualitative methods to study job stress in the self-employed. With Renzo Bianchi (the Norwegian University of Science and Technology), Schonfeld produced empirical evidence revealing that what has been called burnout is actually a depressive phenomenon.

In 2020, he and Bianchi co-developed the Occupational Depression Inventory (ODI), a nine-item assessment tool that measures depressive symptoms explicitly attributed to work. The ODI has demonstrated strong psychometric properties, including high validity and measurement invariance across multiple languages and cultural contexts, making it a widely applicable instrument for occupational mental health research.

Building on their work on depression, Bianchi and Schonfeld expanded into the assessment of work-related anxiety, contributing to the development of the Occupational Anxiety Inventory (OCAI) and the Pandemic Anxiety Inventory (PAI). These tools have been validated in collaboration with international research teams, further extending the scope of his contributions to understanding and measuring the mental health impacts of work and global crises.

== Selected publications ==
- Schonfeld, Irvin Sam; Bianchi, Renzo (2025-05-20). Breaking Point. Wiley. doi:10.1002/9781394249626. ISBN 978-1-394-24949-7.
- Schonfeld, Irvin Sam; Chang, Chu-Hsiang (2016). Occupational Health Psychology: Work, Stress, and Health (1 ed.). New York, NY: Springer Publishing Company. doi:10.1891/9780826199683. ISBN 978-0-8261-9967-6.
- Bianchi, Renzo; De Beer, Leon T.; Engelbrecht, Gerhard J.; van der Vaart, Leoni; Schonfeld, Irvin Sam (2025-08-21). "The occupational anxiety inventory: A new measure of job-related distress". International Journal of Stress Management. doi:10.1037/str0000371. ISSN 1573-3424.
- Schonfeld, Irvin Sam; Prytherch, Tasmyn; Cropley, Mark; Bianchi, Renzo (2023). "The Pandemic Anxiety Inventory: A validation study". Journal of Health Psychology. 28 (3): 216–229. doi:10.1177/13591053221106129. ISSN 1359-1053. PMC 9982399. PMID 35787177.
- Schonfeld, Irvin Sam; Bianchi, Renzo (2022). "Distress in the workplace: Characterizing the relationship of burnout measures to the Occupational Depression Inventory". International Journal of Stress Management. 29 (3): 253–259. doi:10.1037/str0000261. ISSN 1573-3424.
- Cavalcante, Danisio C.; Bianchi, Renzo; Schonfeld, Irvin Sam; Martins, Rita; Cameira, Miguel; Queirós, Cristina (2025-07-11). "The relation of telework, hybrid work, and in-person work to mental health: A study of Brazilian civil servants". Journal of Workplace Behavioral Health: 1–15. doi:10.1080/15555240.2025.2527630. ISSN 1555-5240.
- Schonfeld, Irvin (2025-06-07). "Charting your own course: Diverse paths to occupational health psychology". Publications and Research.
- Bianchi, Renzo; Schonfeld, Irvin Sam (2025-06-10). "On mischaracterizations of the Occupational Depression Inventory". WORK: A Journal of Prevention, Assessment & Rehabilitation 10519815251344886. doi:10.1177/10519815251344886. ISSN 1051-9815.
- Bianchi, Renzo; Schonfeld, Irvin Sam (2025-04-03). "Burnout forever". Work & Stress. 39 (2): 162–168. doi:10.1080/02678373.2025.2497247. ISSN 0267-8373.
- Schonfeld, Irvin Sam; Verkuilen, Jay; Bianchi, Renzo (2019). "Inquiry into the correlation between burnout and depression". Journal of Occupational Health Psychology. 24 (6): 603–616. doi:10.1037/ocp0000151. ISSN 1939-1307.
- Bianchi, Renzo; Verkuilen, Jay; Sowden, James F.; Schonfeld, Irvin Sam (2023). "Towards a new approach to job-related distress: A three-sample study of the Occupational Depression Inventory". Stress and Health. 39 (1): 137–153. doi:10.1002/smi.3177. ISSN 1532-2998. PMC 10084211. PMID 35700982.
- Bianchi, Renzo; Schonfeld, Irvin Sam (2025-04-04). "Reply". Occupational Medicine. 75 (1): 81–82. doi:10.1093/occmed/kqae136. ISSN 0962-7480.
- Bianchi, Renzo; Lindsäter, Elin; Vollan, Tonje Erevik; Tesaker, Rune; Mathisen, Håkon Homme; Øyangen, Sigrid Hovdal; Ek, Benjamin; Bø, Una Wen; Eilertsen, Emilie Sofie; Hauglie-Hanssen, Tonje; Hunvik, Jenny Sofie; Rasul, Maja Hansen; Schonfeld, Irvin Sam (2024). "Most people do not attribute their burnout symptoms to work". Journal of Psychosomatic Research. 187 111962. doi:10.1016/j.jpsychores.2024.111962. PMID 39461233.
- Schonfeld, Irvin S. (1986). "The Genevan and Cattell-Horn conceptions of intelligence compared: Early implementation of numerical solution aids". Developmental Psychology. 22 (2): 204–212. doi:10.1037/0012-1649.22.2.204. ISSN 1939-0599.
- Shaffer, David; Schonfeld, I.; O'Connor, P A.; Trautman, P.; Shafer, S.; Ng, S. (1985-04-01). "Neurological Soft Signs: Their Relationship to Psychiatric Disorder and Intelligence in Childhood and Adolescence". Archives of General Psychiatry. 42 (4): 342. doi:10.1001/archpsyc.1985.01790270028003. ISSN 0003-990X.
