= Job demands-resources model =

Occupational stress model

The job demands-resources model (JD-R model) is an occupational stress model that suggests strain is a response to imbalance between demands on the individual and the resources he or she has to deal with those demands. The JD-R was introduced as an alternative to other models of employee well-being, such as the demand-control model and the effort-reward imbalance model.

The authors of the JD-R model argue that these models "have been restricted to a given and limited set of predictor variables that may not be relevant for all job positions" (p.309). Therefore, the JD-R incorporates a wide range of working conditions into the analyses of organizations and employees. Furthermore, instead of focusing solely on negative outcome variables (e.g., burnout, ill health, and repetitive strain) the JD-R model includes both negative and positive indicators and outcomes of employee well-being.

== Basic assumptions ==
The JD-R model can be summarized with a short list of assumptions/premises:

- Whereas every occupation may have its own specific risk factors associated with job stress, these factors can be classified in two general categories: job demands and job resources.
  - Job demands: physical, psychological, social, or organizational aspects of the job, that require sustained physical and/or psychological effort or skills. Therefore, they are associated with certain physiological and/or psychological costs. Examples are work pressure and emotional demands.
  - Job resources: physical, psychological, social, or organizational aspects of the job that are either: functional in achieving work goals; reduce job demands and the associated physiological and psychological cost; stimulate personal growth, learning, and development. Examples are career opportunities, supervisor coaching, role-clarity, and autonomy.
    - Workplace resources vs. personal resources: The authors of the JD-R make a distinction between workplace resources and personal resources.
- Two different underlying psychological processes play a role in the development of job strain and motivation. The first are physical and social resources available in the workplace setting. The latter, personal resources, are those the employee brings with them. These consist of specific personality traits: self-efficacy and optimism. Both types of resources are powerful mediators of employee well-being (e.g. engagement).
- Outcomes of continued job strain
  - Health impairment process: through this process, poorly designed jobs or chronic job demands exhaust employees' mental and physical resources. In turn, this might lead to the depletion of energy and to health problems.
- Outcomes of abundant job and personal resources
  - Motivational process: through this process, job resources exert their motivating potential and lead to high work engagement, low cynicism, and excellent performance. Job resources may play either an intrinsic or an extrinsic motivational role.
- The interaction between job demands and job resources is important for the development of job strain and motivation as well. According to the JD-R model, job resources may buffer the effect of job demands on job strain, including burnout. Which specific job resources buffer the effect of different job demands, depends on the particular work environment. Thus, different types of job demands and job resources may interact in predicting job strain. Good examples of job resources that have the potential of buffering job demands are performance feedback and social support (e.g.,).
- Job resources particularly influence motivation or work engagement when job demands are high. This assumption is based on the premises of the conservation of resources (COR) theory. According to this theory, people are motivated to obtain, retain and protect their resources, because they are valuable. Hobfoll argues that resource gain acquires its saliency in the context of resource loss. This implies that job resources gain their motivational potential particularly when employees are confronted with high job demands. For example, when employees are faced with high emotional demands, the social support of colleagues might become more visible and more instrumental.

== Evidence ==
- Evidence for the dual process: a number of studies have supported the dual pathways to employee well being proposed by the JD-R model. It has been shown that the model can predict important organizational outcomes (e.g.). Taken together, research findings support the JD-R model's claim that job demands and job resources initiate two different psychological processes, which eventually affect important organizational outcomes (see also,). When both job demands and resources are high, high strain and motivation is to be expected. When both are low, absence of strain and motivation is to be expected. Consequently, the high demands-low resources condition should result in high strain and low motivation while the low demands-high resources condition should have as a consequence low strain and high motivation.
- Evidence for the buffer effect of job resources: some support has been obtained for the proposed interaction between job demands and job resources in their relationship with employee well-being (see,). However, most published studies on the model did either not examine or not report such interactions, whereas the practical relevance of this interaction – if present – is usually small. In a large-scale study, it was found that this interaction accounted for on average only 0.5% of the differences among workers in task enjoyment and work commitment.
- Evidence for the salience of job resources in the context of high job demands: one previous study outside the framework of the JD-R model has supported the hypothesis that resources gain their salience in the context of high demands (see). Studies using the JD-R model have shown that job resources particularly affect work engagement when job demands are high (see and).

== Practical implications ==
The JD-R model assumes that whereas every occupation may have its own specific working characteristics, these characteristics can be classified in two general categories (i.e. job demands and job resources), thus constituting an overarching model that may be applied to various occupational settings, irrespective of the particular demands and resources involved. The central assumption of the JD-R model is that job strain develops – irrespective of the type of job or occupation – when (certain) job demands are high and when (certain) job resources are limited. In contrast, work engagement is most likely when job resources are high (also in the face of high job demands). This implies that the JD-R model can be used as a tool for human resource management.

== Continuing research ==
The most recent article written by the authors of the original JD-R paper proposes that the interactions of demands and resources are nuanced and not clearly understood. Here Bakker and Demerouti suggest that demands may sometimes actually have a positive influence on the employee, by providing a challenge to be overcome rather than an insurmountable obstacle. In this same article, the authors describe a cumulative effect of demands and resources in their suggestion of gain and loss spirals. They conclude that these issues and that of workplace aggression may all be part of the JD-R framework.

== See also ==
- European Academy of Occupational Health Psychology
- Occupational health psychology
- Occupational stress
- Society for Occupational Health Psychology
- Stress management
