= Stress management =

Techniques and therapies to manage stress

Stress management includes a range of methods that can help individuals cope with stress and improve overall well-being, although results can vary depending on the person or situation. It also consists of a wide spectrum of techniques and psychotherapies aimed at controlling a person's level of psychological stress, especially chronic stress, generally for the purpose of improving the function of everyday life. Stress produces numerous physical and mental symptoms which vary according to each individual's situational factors. These can include a decline in physical health, such as headaches, chest pain, fatigue, sleep problems, and depression. The process of stress management is a key factor that can lead to a happy and successful life in modern society. . Stress management provides numerous ways to manage anxiety and maintain overall well-being.

There are several models of stress management, each with distinctive explanations of mechanisms for controlling stress. More research is necessary to provide a better understanding of which mechanisms actually operate and are effective in practice.

== Stress management techniques ==
Many stress management techniques cope with stresses one may find themselves withstanding. Some of the following ways listed help to reduce higher than usual stress levels temporarily or to compensate the biological issues involved; others face the stressors at a higher level of abstraction:

- Autogenic training
- Social activity
- Cognitive therapy
- Conflict resolution
- Cranial release technique
- Getting a hobby
- Meditation
- Mindfulness
- Music as a coping strategy
- Deep breathing
- Yoga Nidra
- Substance abuse
- Nootropics
- Reading novels
- Prayer
- Relaxation techniques
- Artistic expression
- Fractional relaxation
- Humour
- Physical exercise
- Progressive relaxation
- Spas
- Somatics training
- Spending time in nature
- Stress balls
- Tension and Trauma Releasing Exercises
- Natural medicine
- Clinically validated alternative treatments
- Time management
- Planning and decision making
- Listening to certain types of relaxing music
- Spending quality time with pets
- Art Therapy/Coloring

Some sources of stress stem from high levels of demand that require extra effort and workload. In such cases, creating a time schedule can help—one that temporarily reduces the usual frequency and duration of previous commitments until the period of increased personal demands has passed.

Techniques of stress management will vary according to the philosophical paradigm.

== Historical foundations ==
Walter Cannon and Hans Selye used animal studies to establish the earliest scientific basis for the study of stress. They measured the physiological responses of animals to external pressures, such as heat and cold, prolonged restraint, and surgical procedures then extrapolated from these studies to human beings.

Subsequent studies of stress in humans by Richard Rahe and others established that stress is caused by distinct, measurable life stressors, and that these life stressors can be ranked by the median degree of stress they produce (leading to the Holmes and Rahe Stress Scale). Holmes and Rahe is focused on how life's stressors can influence ones health and wellness. The scale was developed to measure the effects of stress on health using life change units, in an attempt to quantify stress and its correlation to illness. Thus, stress was traditionally conceptualized to be a result of external insults beyond the control of those experiencing the stress. More recently, however, it has been argued that external circumstances do not have any intrinsic capacity to produce stress, but instead, their effect is mediated by the individual's perceptions, capacities, and understanding.

There are several models of stress management, each with distinctive explanations of mechanisms for controlling stress. Much more research is necessary to provide a better understanding of which mechanisms actually operate and are effective in practice.

== Models ==
The generalized models are:

- The emergency response/fight-or-flight response by Walter Cannon (1914, 1932)
- General Adaptation Syndrome by Hans Selye (1936)
- Stress Model of Henry and Stephens (1977)
- Transactional (or cognitive) Stress Model / stress model of Lazarus after Lazarus (1974)
- Theory of resource conservation by Stevan Hobfoll (1988, 1998; Hobfoll & Buchwald, 2004)

=== Transactional model ===
In 1981, Richard Lazarus and Susan Folkman suggested that stress can be thought of as resulting from an "imbalance between demands and resources" or as occurring when "pressure exceeds one's perceived ability to cope". Stress management was developed and premised on the idea that stress is not a direct response to a stressor but rather an individual's resources and abilities to cope and mediate the stress response which are amenable to change, thus allowing stress to be controllable.

Transactional Model of Stress and Coping of Richard Lazarus

Among the many stressors mentioned by employees, these are the most common:

- Conflicts in company
- How the company treats co-workers

In order to develop an effective stress management program, it is first necessary to identify the factors that are central to a person controlling his/her stress and to identify the intervention methods which effectively target these factors. Lazarus and Folkman's interpretation of stress focuses on the transaction between people and their external environment (known as the Transactional Model). The model contends that stress may not be a stressors if the person does not perceive the stressors as a threat but rather as positive or even challenging. Also, if the person possesses or can use adequate coping skills, then stress may not actually be a result or develop because of the stressors. The model proposes that people can be taught to manage their stress and cope with their stressors. They may learn to change their perspective of the stressors and provide them with the ability and confidence to improve their lives and handle all of the types of stressors.

=== Health realization/innate health model ===
The health realization/innate health model of stress is founded on the idea that stress does not necessarily follow the presence of a potential stressor. Instead of focusing on the individual's appraisal of so-called stressors in relation to his or her own coping skills (as the transactional model does), the health realization model focuses on the nature of thought, stating that it is ultimately a person's thought processes that determines the response to potentially stressful external circumstances. In this model, stress results from appraising oneself and one's circumstances through a mental filter of insecurity and negativity, whereas a feeling of well-being results from approaching the world with a "quiet mind". This theory deposits that moods fluctuate and cannot be changed by a specific pattern of thinking. Mental discomfort is only deepened by focus on how to change one's mood, so moods should be "waited out" and dwelling avoided based on this framework. This model proposes that helping stressed individuals understand the nature of thought—especially providing them with the ability to recognize when they are in the grip of insecure thinking, disengage from it, and access natural positive feelings—will reduce their stress.

=== Stress prevention and resilience ===
Although many techniques have traditionally been developed to deal with the consequences of stress, considerable research has also been conducted on the prevention of stress, a subject closely related to psychological resilience-building. A number of self-help approaches to stress-prevention and resilience-building have been developed, drawing mainly on the theory and practice of cognitive-behavioral therapy. Physical exercise may improve psychological resilience, which can support a person's ability to manage stress. Exercise programs lasting longer than eight weeks have been associated with more improvements and psychological resilience compared to shorter programs.

=== Measuring stress ===
There are different ways to measure stress levels. One way is through psychological testing. The Holmes and Rahe Stress Scale is used to rate stressful life events and how life stressors influence illness. The DASS (Depression Anxiety Stress Scales) contains a scale for stress based on self-report items. Changes in blood pressure and galvanic skin response can also be measured to test stress levels. A digital thermometer can be used to evaluate changes in skin temperature, which can indicate activation of the fight-or-flight response drawing blood away from the extremities. Cortisol is the main hormone released during a stress response and measuring cortisol from hair will give a 60- to 90-day baseline stress level of an individual. This method of measuring stress is currently the most popular method in the clinic .

Research has shown that participating in stress management programs can lower cortisol levels, which are associated with the body's stress response.Which can lead to affect on immune function, mood and sleep. The authors mentioned benefits were stronger programs were practiced over time, methods that can have physical improvements but also emotional.

Despite stress often being thought of as a subjective experience, levels of stress are readily measurable; using various physiological tests, similar to those used in polygraphs. An example of stress being measured is using nano EEG sensors in detecting stress.

=== Effectiveness ===
Stress management has physiological and immune benefits.

Positive outcomes are observed using a combination of non-drug interventions:

- treatment of anger or hostility,
- autogenic training which is a relaxation technique used to reduce stress and bring the mind and the body into balance through repeated exercises, such as deep breathing, to promote mental relaxation. Research done by L. Varvogli and C. Darviri shows that this technique has several therapeutic health benefits aiding in those that experienced tension headaches, heart disease, anxiety, and many others.
- talking therapy (around relationship or existential issues)
- biofeedback allows people to monitor their bodies internal function such as, heart rate, muscle tension, temperature, and use this information to learn how to control the bodies response which can lead to better physical, mental, and emotional health. Some consider it to be effective however critics have compared its efficacy to that of conventional therapies as well as the cost effectiveness of biofeedback is uncertain.
- cognitive therapy for anxiety or clinical depression

== Stress management programs ==
Many businesses have begun to use stress management programs for employees who are having trouble adapting to stress at the workplace or at home. Some companies provide special equipment adapting to stress in the workplace to their employees, like coloring diaries and stress relieving gadgets. Many people have spill over stress from home into their working environment. There are a couple of ways businesses try to reduce the stress levels of their employees. One way is through individual intervention. This starts off by monitoring the stressors of the individual. After monitoring what causes the stress, next is attacking that stressor and trying to figure out ways to alleviate them. Developing and maintaining social support networks is considered vital in stress management interventions. Research has shown that social support enhances resilience to stress and contributes to better physical and mental health outcomes by buffering the effects of stressful experiences on the body and mind. Changing behavioral patterns, may in turn, help reduce some of the stress that is put on at work as well.

Employee assistance programs can include in-house counseling programs on managing stress. Evaluative research has been conducted on EAPs that teach individuals stress control and inoculation techniques such as relaxation, biofeedback, and cognitive restructuring. Studies show that these programs can reduce the level of physiological arousal associated with high stress. Participants who master behavioral and cognitive stress-relief techniques report less tension, fewer sleep disturbances, and an improved ability to cope with workplace stressors.

Another way of reducing stress at work is by simply changing the workload for an employee, or even giving them more control as to when or where they work.

Improving communications between employees is effective for helping reduce stress. Making the employee feel like they are a bigger part of the company, it gives them a voice in bigger situations shows trust and value in their opinion. Having all the employees cooperate with each other is an underlying factor which can take away much of workplace stress. Lastly, changing the physical qualities of the workplace may reduce stress. Changing things such as the lighting, air temperature, odor, and up to date technology.

Intervention is broken down into three steps: primary, secondary, tertiary. Primary deals with eliminating the stressors altogether. Secondary deals with detecting stress and figuring out ways to cope with it and improving stress management skills. Finally, tertiary deals with recovery and rehabbing the stress altogether. These three steps are usually the most effective way to deal with stress not just in the workplace, but overall.

== Types of stress ==
=== Acute stress ===
Acute stress is the most common form of stress among humans worldwide. It deals with the pressures of the near future or the very recent past. While acute stress is often interpreted as being a negative experience, it can actually be beneficial and even necessary for one's wellbeing because of its protective effects against potentially dangerous threats. Slamming on the brakes while driving in order to avoid a car accident could be considered a moment of beneficial acute stress. Running or any other form of exercise would also be considered an acute stressor. Some exciting or exhilarating experiences such as riding a roller coaster is an acute stress but is usually very enjoyable. Acute stress is a short term stress and as a result, does not have enough time to do the damage that long term stress causes.

=== Chronic stress ===
Unlike acute stress, which only lasts for a moment, chronic stress lasts for longer time spans. It has a wearing effect on people that can become a very serious health risk if it continues over a long period of time.

Chronic stress can lead to memory loss, damage spatial recognition and produce a decreased drive of eating. Additional symptoms of chronic stress include aches and pains, insomnia or other sleep disturbances, changes in social behaviors, low energy, emotional withdrawal or other changes in emotional responses, and unfocused thinking. Chronic stress has also been associated with other medical conditions such as hypertension, heart disease, diabetes, obesity, and arthritis.

The severity varies from person to person. Gender difference can also be an underlying factor. Women are able to take longer durations of stress than men without showing the same maladaptive changes. Men can deal with shorter stress duration better than women can. If men hit a certain threshold, the chances of them developing mental issues increase drastically.

Chronic stress is a major health issue that affects people of all ages and can have profound effects on physical and mental health. It is a long-standing, unrelieved, and unavoidable stress, that include busy work, school schedules, and complex relationships. Over time, chronic stress can alter the body's systems, leading to a variety of illnesses and conditions.

== Stress in the workplace ==
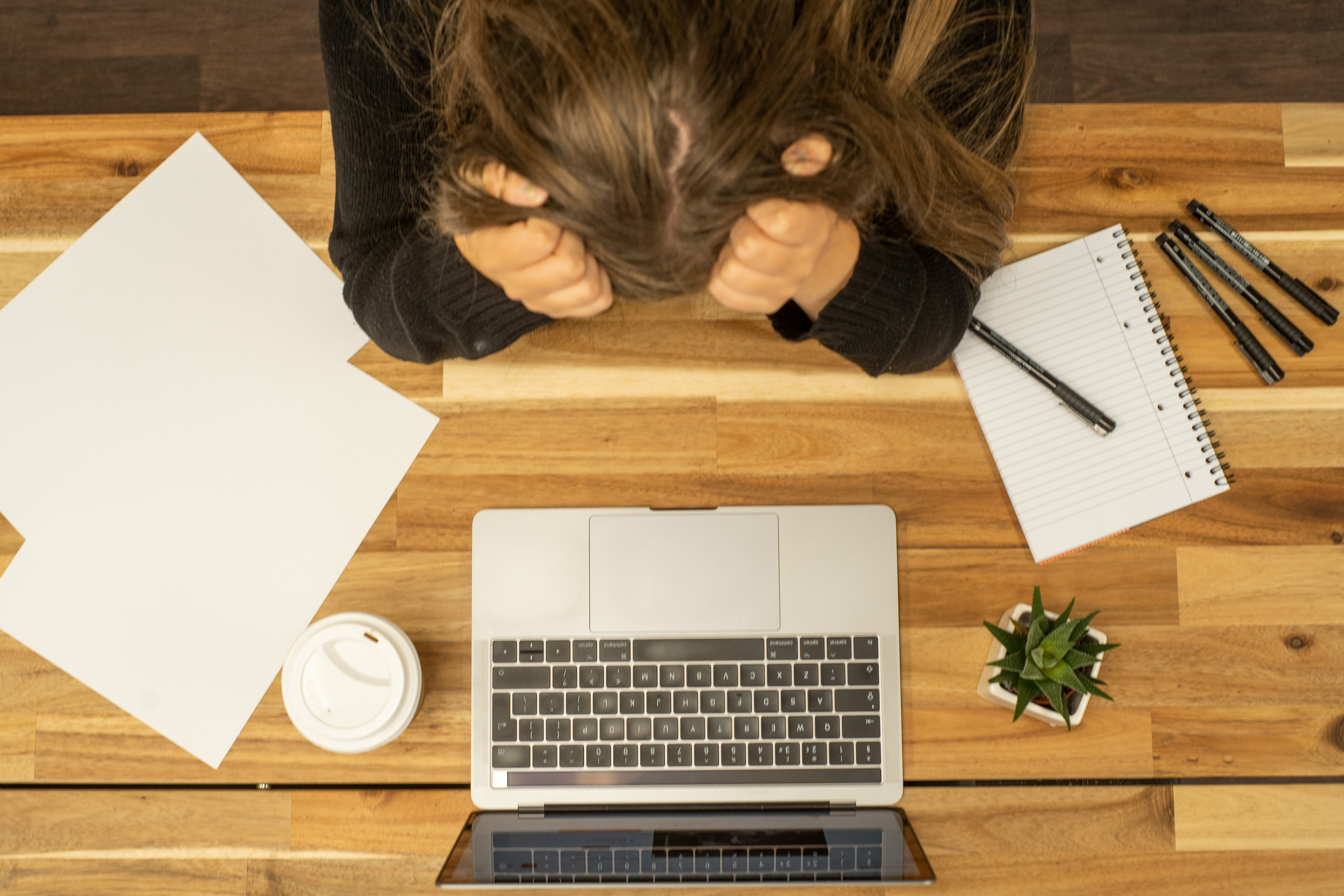
Workplace Stress

In the workplace, managing stress becomes vital in order to keep up job performance as well as relationship with co-workers and employers. For some workers, changing the work environment relieves work stress. Making the environment less competitive between employees decreases some amounts of stress.Companies and businesses tend to be more successful when the work environment facilitates more cooperation rather than competition. In the workplace, people feel more comfortable and capable of completing the work due to their support from coworkers and employers. As a result, both companies and employees benefit from a cooperating relationship. Competition in the workplace can leave employees feeling like it is “every man for himself” which can increase stress.

Author J, Carr highlighted three areas of the workplace that affects the levels of stress experienced. Job demands, individual differences, and social demands. These areas that heighten stress are addressed in Rahe's scale suggesting that some of the greatest stressors in life are connected to the workplace. Stress in the workplace does not always have to be negatively viewed. When managed well, stress can increase employees' focus and productivity. According to the Yerkes–Dodson law, stress is beneficial to human functioning, but only up to a point. People who experience very low levels of stress might feel under stimulated and passive, while those with excessively high levels of stress may feel overwhelmed, anxious, and irritable. Thus, establishing an optimum level of stress is key.

A study done a few years ago found that most effective programs focused on improving social work, teamwork, and communication between employees and leadership. Encouraging open communication, and offering support systems were shown to lower stress levels and improved job satisfaction.

Leadership can also be a part of a role in preventing and reducing stress in the workplace. A 2025 meta-analysis mentioned that when team leaders and managers receive training on how to handle stress and support their teams experience a lower stress and burnout level. When leaders are able to manage their own stress they are better at encouraging communications and trust with their team which benefits both leaders and employees.

Stress management programs can also help employees reduce stress in the workplace. A 2008 meta-analysis found that workplace stress management programs were effective in reducing stress for employees. The program that showed the most improvements in reducing stress, focused on cognitive behavioral techniques compared to other types of interventions. These techniques can help employees develop ways to manage stressful situations in the workplace.

Organizational stress levels that an individual faces is dependent not just on external factors such as job characteristics or environment, but also on intrapersonal factors such as personality, temperament, and individual coping and thinking styles.

Also, stress at workplace is not limited to employees. Entrepreneurs also undergo stress This stress can vary from team management, business management or unfavorable policy from the government.

=== Commitment ===
Some examples of stressors in the workplace can be their perception of Organization Commitment, which is the way an employee conceptualizes his/her reasons for staying in the organizations for either Affective, Continuance, or Normative reasons. Affective commitment to the organization is the situation where an employee strongly identifies with the values and culture of the organization. While this is not directly telling of an employee's stress levels, it is a genuine interest and enjoyment in the employee's work and work relations that places the employee in a good position to manage stress well. Employees who stay in an organization for continuance reasons stay as a result of weighing the pros and cons, and then decides that the opportunity cost of leaving the organization is too high. Employees under this category might experience moderate levels of stress, as their reasons for staying is driven more by external rather than internal motivation. Employees who stay for normative reasons, however, are most likely to experience the highest levels of stress, as these are the employees who stay out of obligation and duty.

=== Culture differences ===
Cultural differences have also shown to have some major effects on stress coping problems. Eastern Asian employees may deal with certain work situations differently from how a Western North American employee would. In a study conducted in Malaysia, it was found that while the classification of workplace stress is similar between Malaysians and Western employees, the perception of workplace stress as well as the approaches to coping with stress were different. In order to manage stress in the workplace, employers can provide stress managing programs such as therapy, communication programs, and a more flexible work schedule. There have been many studies conducted demonstrating the benefits of mindfulness practices on subjective well-being and work outcomes. Productivity, organization, and performance increase, while burnout rates decrease. Individuals who received either low or high levels of support from their supervisors for stress management usually viewed the intervention positively. This perception was described in terms of the intervention either compensating for or complementing their work environment, depending on the level of support received.

== Stress in the medical environment ==
A study was done on the stress levels in general practitioners and hospital consultants in 1999. Over 500 medical employees participated in this study done by R.P Caplan. These results showed that 47% of the workers scored high on their questionnaire for high levels of stress. 27% of the general practitioners even scored to be very depressed. Managers stress levels were not as high as the actual practitioners themselves. An eye opening statistic showed that nearly 54% of workers suffered from anxiety while being in the hospital. Although this was a small sample size for hospitals around the world, Caplan feels this trend is probably fairly accurate across the majority of hospitals.

In addition, there is a study that the objective of this study was to investigate the relationship between work performance and self-reported symptoms of depression, stress, and anxiety among nurses working in tuberculosis (TB)/HIV and COVID-19 units on Timor Island, Indonesia. The study used a comparative, cross-sectional design and collected data between October 2020 and January 2021. The study group comprised 236 nurses working in TB/HIV isolation rooms and 423 nurses in COVID-19 isolation rooms. The Depression, Anxiety, and Stress scale (DASS-42) and a work performance questionnaire were used to collect data, which were analyzed using independent t-testing and Pearson correlation coefficient. The results showed that the mean DASS-42 scores of nurses in TB/HIV isolation units were low, indicating minimal effects, while those in COVID-19 isolation units demonstrated moderate levels of depression, stress, and anxiety. Additionally, the work performance results indicated that the nurses in the TB/HIV isolation rooms had sufficient work performance, while those in the COVID-19 isolation rooms had weaker work performance. There was a significant difference in work performance between nurses in the two units. The study concluded that there was a correlation between nurses' depression, stress, and anxiety levels and their work performance in TB/HIV and COVID-19 isolation units.

== Stress in the aviation industry ==
Aviation is a high-stress industry, given that it requires a high level of precision at all times. Chronically high stress levels can ultimately decrease the performance and compromise safety. To be effective, stress measurement tools must be specific to the aviation industry, given its unique working environment and other stressors. Stress measurement in aviation seeks to quantify the psychological stress experienced by aviators, with the goal of making needed improvements to aviators' coping and stress management skills.

To more precisely measure stress, aviators' many responsibilities are broken down into "workloads." This helps to categorize the broad concept of "stress" by specific stressors. Additionally, since different workloads may pose unique stressors, this method may be more effective than measuring stress levels as a whole. Stress measurement tools can then help aviators identify which stressors are most problematic for them, and help them improve on managing workloads, planning tasks, and coping with stress more effectively.

To evaluate workload, a number of tools can be used. The major types of measurement tools are:

1. Performance-based measures;
2. Subjective measures, like questionnaires which aviators answer themselves; and
3. Physiological measures, like measurement of heart rate.

Implementation of evaluation tools requires time, instruments for measurement, and software for collecting data.

=== Measurement systems ===
The most commonly used stress measurement systems are primarily rating scale-based. These systems tend to be complex, containing multiple levels with a variety of sections, to attempt to capture the many stressors present in the aviation industry. Different systems may be utilized in different operational specialties.

- The Perceived Stress Scale (PSS) – The PSS is a widely used subjective tool for measuring stress levels. It consists of 10 questions, and asks participants to rate, on a five-point scale, how stressed they felt after a certain event. All 10 questions are summed to obtain a total score from 0 to 40. In the aviation industry, for example, it has been used with flight training students to measure how stressed they felt after flight training exercises.
- The Coping Skills Inventory – This inventory measures aviators' skills for coping with stress. This is another subjective measure, asking participants to rate, on a five-point scale, the extent to which they use eight common coping skills: Substance abuse, Emotional support, Instrumental support (help with tangible things, like child care, finances, or task sharing), Positive reframing (changing one's thinking about a negative event, and thinking of it as a positive instead), Self-blame, Planning, Humour and Religion. An individual's total score indicates the extent to which he or she is using effective, positive coping skills (like humor and emotional support); ineffective, negative coping skills (like substance abuse and self-blame); and where the individual could improve.
- The Subjective Workload Assessment Technique (SWAT) – SWAT is a rating system used to measure individuals' perceived mental workload while performing a task, like developing instruments in a lab, multitasking aircraft duties, or conducting air defense. SWAT combines measurements and scaling techniques to develop a global rating scale.

=== Pilot stress report systems ===
Early pilot stress report systems were adapted and modified from existing psychological questionnaires and surveys. The data from these pilot-specific surveys is then processed and analyzed through an aviation-focused system or scale. Pilot-oriented questionnaires are generally designed to study work stress or home stress. Self-report can also be used to measure a combination of home stress, work stress, and perceived performance. A study conducted by Fiedler, Della Rocco, Schroeder and Nguyen (2000) used Sloan and Cooper's modification of the Alkov questionnaire to explore aviators' perceptions of the relationship between different types of stress. The results indicated that pilots believed performance was impaired when home stress carried over to the work environment. The degree of home stress that carried over to work environment was significantly and negatively related to flying performance items, such as planning, control, and accuracy of landings. The questionnaire was able to reflect pilots' retroactive perceptions and the accuracy of these perceptions.

Alkov, Borowsky, and Gaynor started a 22-item questionnaire for U.S. Naval aviators in 1982 to test the hypothesis that inadequate stress coping strategies contributed to flight mishaps. The questionnaire consists of items related to lifestyle changes and personality characteristics. After completing the questionnaire, the test group is divided into two groups: "at-fault" with mishap, and "not-at-fault" in a mishap. Then, questionnaires from these two groups were analyzed to examine differences. A study of British commercial airline pilots, conducted by Sloan and Cooper (1986), surveyed 1,000 pilot members from the British Airline Pilots' Association (BALPA). They used a modified version of Alkov, Borowsky, and Gaynor's questionnaire to collect data on pilots' perceptions of the relationship between stress and performance. Being a subjective measure, this study's data was based on pilots' perceptions, and thus rely on how accurately they recall past experiences their relationships to stress. Despite relying on subjective perceptions and memories, the study showed that pilot reports are noteworthy.

Beck Depression Inventory (BDI) is another scale used in many industries, including the mental health professions, to screen for depressive symptoms.

Parsa and Kapadia (1997) used the BDI to survey a group of 57 U.S. Air Force fighter pilots who had flown combat operations. The adaptation of the BDI to the aviation field was problematic. However, the study revealed some unexpected findings. The results indicated that 89% of the pilots reported insomnia; 86% reported irritability; 63%, dissatisfaction; 38%, guilt; and 35%, loss of libido. 50% of two squadrons and 33% of another squadron scored above 9 on the BDI, suggesting at least low levels of depression. Such measurement may be difficult to interpret accurately.

== Stress in College ==
College can be a particularly stressful period for many students as they adjust to a new and often unfamiliar environment while transitioning from adolescence to adulthood. Nearly 80% of college students report frequently experiencing daily stress. Sources of stress that influence college students’ stress levels include family and friends who are often physically further away, along with shifts in communication patterns with these individuals. Other influential factors include long-held beliefs (i.e. religious beliefs) and new opportunities for various behavior (i.e. alcohol and drug use). In addition to these potential sources of stress, college students are often faced with rigorous academic demands. To manage these challenges, students tend to rely on many strategies including problem-focused and emotion-focused coping.

A 2021 review found that when teens and college students spent more online during the COVID-19 pandemic, to stay connected while everything else was limited.Sometimes helped them stay connected, but it also made more stress and anxiety for more users creating a positive but also a negative effect on mental health. It states the effects of social media on how it was used, suggesting to be mindful and moderate to reduce stress rather than creating more.

Problem-focused strategies employ action-oriented behavioral activities such as planning. Emotion-focused strategies involve the expression of emotion and often include the altering of expectations. Although problem-focused strategies have often been found to be more effective than emotion-focused strategies, both categories include coping mechanisms that effectively reduce the negative impacts of stress.

Practical examples of problem-focused strategies include developing time management skills, avoiding procrastination, and setting goals. These skills help students prioritize responsibilities, allowing more time for restorative activities like sleep and leisure activities, both of which are linked to lower stress levels. Healthy sleep patterns, in particular, are strongly associated with improved stress management. Working towards or maintaining healthy sleep habits helps individuals better cope with high levels of stress.

Emotion-focused strategies have also been found to be effective in combating stress. Accommodation strategies that do not directly change the stressor, but rather help to change one's emotions surrounding the stressors, such as positive reframing, are widely associated with stress reduction. Strategies such as using humor and journaling—especially gratitude journaling are also effective methods for reducing stress . While these strategies don't change the stressor itself, they help students better regulate their emotional response.

Another emotion-focused strategy gaining popularity among college students is art therapy and creative expression through activities like coloring. Particularly for college students, who are often exposed to a variety of stressors such as academic performance, family problems, and social disturbances, these stressors can have a significant negative impact on their lives and overall well-being. Given the commonness of stress among college students, understanding the role of coloring in stress reduction is critical as college students are seen as more prone to stress in all forms. Moreover, stress among college students can have profound effects on academic performance, with 18.2% of students claiming anxiety as their primary stressor, significantly impacting their ability to perform academically. To cope, many students turn to activities like working out or participating in recreational hobbies. However, simpler activities such as coloring can also be highly effective in reducing stress levels. Coloring therapy, or different coloring activities, offer a creative approach to stress reduction, harnessing the therapeutic essence of artistic expression to promote relaxation and reduce unwanted emotions without the use of excessive skill or focus. Coloring is suggested to offer benefits to well-being by providing a structured activity that avoids overwhelming individuals with too many decisions, such as what to draw, while still promoting engagement and facilitating mindfulness. Engaging in artistic activities has been shown to reduce anxiety and promote mindfulness by allowing individuals to focus on the present moment. Coloring, in particular, has been found to lower stress levels and induce a meditative state, especially when using structured patterns like mandalas. These creative outlets offer students a non-verbal way to process emotions and find calm during stressful periods.

Without effective coping skills, students may turn to harmful behaviors as a means of temporary relief. Common but unsafe coping strategies among college students include drinking excessively, drug use, excessive caffeine consumption, withdrawal from social activities, self-harm, and eating disorders. These behaviors often become habitual, addictive, and sometimes fatal and may worsen stress in the long run. For example, when college students turn to drinking as a way of coping with stress, they may gradually consume more alcohol more frequently, rather than occasional drinking with friends. This can lead to an increased risk for addiction, alcohol poisoning, and other dangerous behaviors.

While researchers have found no significant gender differences in the use of problem-focused coping strategies, there are distinctions of gender variation in regard to emotion-focused coping. Women tend to use emotion-focused coping strategies more often than men. However, men do report using one emotion-focused coping strategy more often than women—mental disengagement in the form of alcohol use. Mental disengagement refers to when individuals refocus their negative emotions to an alternative resource, such as alcohol, instead of addressing the original stressor. Women also report higher stress levels overall, especially in areas like social relationships, daily hassles, finances, self-imposed stress, frustration, and academics. This could be because women are often more in-tune to their emotions and are more comfortable expressing their feelings.

While stress for college students is part of the transitional experience, there are many strategies that students can use to reduce stress in their lives and manage the impacts of stress. Time management skills, which encompass goal setting, scheduling, and pacing are effective approaches to reducing stress. Additionally, maintaining one's physical and mental health through regular exercise, balanced nutrition, quality sleep, and mindfulness practices can also play a critical role. There are several services, such as counseling and therapy, available to students that can be accessed both on and off campus to support stress management and overall student wellbeing. Adults in college benefit fairly equally from methods that are more directly related to stress management (such as time management and relaxation exercises) and being physically active (such as adding running or weight lifting into your regular routine).

An approach for stress relief commonly adopted by college students is engaging in gaming as a hobby. While some research suggests a negative relationship between video game usage and academic performance, several studies indicate a positive correlation between stress reduction and playing casual video games. For instance, one study demonstrated that engaging in casual video games effectively decreased psychological and physiological stress levels among students, with comparable benefits to stress-relieving meditation. When utilized with appropriate time management, video gaming can serve as a viable stress-relief strategy for college students.

== See also ==
- Abusive power and control
- European Academy of Occupational Health Psychology
- International Journal of Stress Management
- Journal of Occupational Health Psychology
- Occupational health psychology
- Society for Occupational Health Psychology
