= Occupational Depression Inventory =

Psychometric tool for assessing the severity of work-related depressive symptoms

- Purpose: to ascertain the severity of work-related depression and arrive at a provisional diagnosis of work-related depression

The Occupational Depression Inventory (ODI) is a psychometric instrument, the purpose of which is to assess the severity of work-related depressive symptoms and arrive at a provisional diagnosis of depressive disorder. The ODI can be used by epidemiologists aiming to identify organizations that potentially foster depressogenic conditions. The authors regard the ODI as an instrument that "has the potential to replace burnout scales and become one of the tools used by occupational health specialists to identify depressed workers in need of treatment" (p. 127).

Occupational health specialists (e.g., occupational physicians, occupational health psychologists, and clinical psychologists) can employ the instrument to ascertain the extent to which a worker has experienced work-related depressive symptoms. It would then be incumbent upon the specialists to identify and correct the specific job conditions (e.g., work overload, bullying) that give rise to elevations in depressive symptoms. Epidemologists can take advantage of an algorithm that comes with the instrument to ascertain the frequency of provisional cases of work-related depressive disorder. (Note: The ODI cannot be used to make a standard diagnosis of depression. The instrument is limited to making a provisional diagnosis based on its algorithm. Only a trained clinician in the context of a standard clinical interview can make that diagnosis.) Moreover, available evidence indicates that burnout scales have very high correlations with the ODI, correlations that cannot be explained by item content overlap, suggesting that the ODI is a suitable replacement for burnout scales like the MBI.

The original ODI was first published in English and French. Both versions have excellent psychometric properties. Since its inception, psychometrically valid versions of the instrument have become available in other languages, including Spanish, Italian, Brazilian Portuguese, Polish, Swedish, and Ukrainian.

Validity research on the ODI has been conducted in several countries. These countries include the United States, France, Brazil, Spain, Italy, Switzerland, New Zealand, South Africa, Australia, Sweden, Poland, and Ukraine.

== See also ==
- Allostatic load
- Beck Depression Inventory
- Center for Epidemiological Studies Depression Scale (CES-D)
- European Academy of Occupational Health Psychology
- Hospital Anxiety and Depression Scale
- Occupational burnout
- Occupational health psychology
- PHQ-9, the nine-item Patient Health Questionnaire, a depressive symptom scale
- Rating scales for depression
- Society for Occupational Health Psychology
