= Work & Stress =

- Discipline: Occupational health psychology, workplace health and safety
- Language: English
- Edited by: Toon Taris

Publication details
- History: 1987–present
- Publisher: Taylor & Francis in association with the European Academy of Occupational Health Psychology
- Frequency: Quarterly
- Open access: Hybrid
- Impact factor: 3.140 (2017)

Standard abbreviations
- ISO 4: Work Stress

Indexing
- ISSN: 0267-8373 (print); 1464-5335 (web)
- OCLC no.: 828101689

Links
- Journal homepage; Online access; Online archive

Work & Stress is a quarterly peer-reviewed academic journal covering occupational health psychology and workplace health and safety. It is published by Taylor & Francis in association with the European Academy of Occupational Health Psychology.

== History and scope ==
The journal was established in 1987 by founding editor-in-chief Tom Cox (Birkbeck, University of London). The first volumes were principally concerned with work and stress, "the central focus of occupational health psychology". The journal's scope expanded over time to cover more occupational health psychology-related topics. In 2000 the journal became affiliated with the European Academy of Occupational Health Psychology. The journal's scope currently includes occupational health psychology and workplace health and safety. Toon Taris (Utrecht University) succeeded Tom Cox as editor in 2014.

== Abstracting and indexing ==
The journal is abstracted and indexed in:

- Current Contents/Social & Behavioral Sciences
- PASCAL
- International Bibliography of the Social Sciences
- PsycINFO
- Scopus
- Social Sciences Citation Index
- Sociological Abstracts

== See also ==
- Journal of Occupational Health Psychology
- Occupational medicine
- Occupational stress
- Society for Occupational Health Psychology
