= Occupational stress =

Tensions related to work

A video on workplace stress (see also: Part 2)

Occupational stress or job strain is chronic psychological stress related to one's job. Occupational stress can be managed by understanding what the stressful conditions at work are and taking steps to remediate those conditions. One of the most common forms of stress, it is characterized by a combination of low salaries, high demands, and low levels of control over things such as raises and paid time off. Stresses at work can be eustress, a positive type of stress, or distress, a negative type of stress. Job strain in the workplace has been proven to result in poor psychological health, and eventually poor physical health. Job strain has been a recurring issue for years and affects men and women differently.

Occupational stress can occur when workers do not feel supported by supervisors or coworkers, feel as if they have little control over the work they perform, or find that their efforts on the job are incommensurate with the job's rewards. Occupational stress is a concern for both employees and employers because stressful job conditions are related to employees' emotional well-being, physical health, and job performance. The World Health Organization and the International Labour Organization conducted a study. The results showed that exposure to long working hours, operates through increased psycho-social occupational stress. It is the occupational risk factor with the largest attributable burden of disease, according to these official estimates causing an estimated 745,000 workers to die from ischemic heart disease and stroke events in 2016.

A number of disciplines within psychology are concerned with occupational stress including occupational health psychology, human factors and ergonomics, epidemiology, occupational medicine, sociology, industrial and organizational psychology, and industrial engineering.

== Psychological theories of worker stress ==
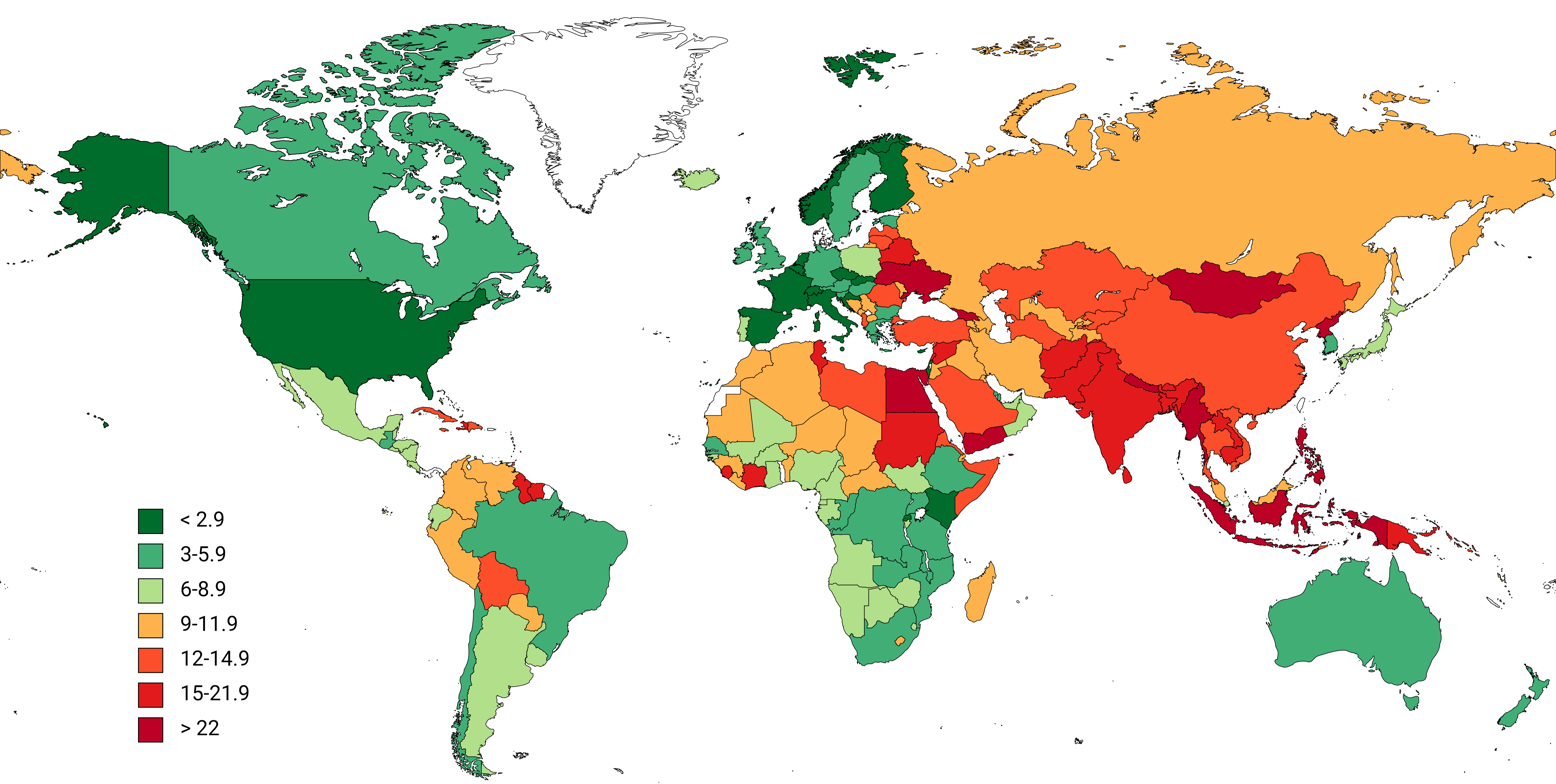
Deaths due to long working hours per 100,000 people (15+), joint study conducted by World Health Organization and International Labour Organization in 2016

Average annual hours actually worked per worker in OECD countries from 1970 to 2020

A number of psychological theories at least partly explain the occurrence of occupational stress. The theories include the demand-control-support model, the effort-reward imbalance model, the person-environment fit model, job characteristics model, the diathesis stress model, and the job-demands resources model.

=== Demand-control-support model ===
The demand-control-support (DCS) model, originally the demand-control (DC) model, has been the most influential psychological theory in occupational stress research. The DC model advances the idea that the combination of low levels of work-related decision latitude (i.e., autonomy and control over the job) and high psychological workloads is harmful to the health of workers. High workloads and low levels of decision latitude either in combination or singly can lead to job strain, the term often used in the field of occupational health psychology to reflect poorer mental or physical health. The DC model has been extended to include work-related social isolation or lack of support from coworkers and supervisors to become the DCS model. Evidence indicates that high workload, low levels of decision latitude, and low levels of support either in combination or singly lead to poorer health. The combination of high workload, low levels of decision latitude, and low levels of support has also been termed iso-strain.

=== Effort-reward imbalance model ===
The effort-reward imbalance (ERI) model focuses on the relationship between the worker's efforts and the work-related rewards the employee receives. The ERI model suggests that work marked by high levels of effort and low rewards leads to strain (e.g., psychological symptoms, physical health problems). The rewards of the job can be tangible like pay or intangible like appreciation and fair treatment. Another facet of the model is that overcommitment to the job can fuel imbalance.

=== Person–environment fit model ===
The person–environment fit model underlines the match between a person and his/her work environment. The closeness of the match influences the individual's health. For healthy working conditions, it is necessary that employees' attitudes, skills, abilities, and resources match the demands of their job. The greater the gap or misfit (either subjective or objective) between the person and his/her work environment, the greater the strain. Strains can include mental and physical health problems. Misfit can also lead to lower productivity and other work problems. The P–E fit model was popular in the 1970s and the early 1980s; however, since the late 1980s interest in the model has waned because of difficulties representing P–E discrepancies mathematically and statistical models linking P–E fit to strain have been problematic.

=== Job characteristics model ===
The job characteristics model focuses on factors such as skill variety, task identity, task significance, autonomy, and feedback. These job factors are thought to psychological states such as a sense of meaningfulness and knowledge acquisition. The theory holds that positive or negative job characteristics give rise to a number of cognitive and behavioral outcomes such as extent of worker motivation, satisfaction, and absenteeism. Hackman and Oldham (1980) developed the Job Diagnostic Survey to assess these job characteristics and help organizational leaders make decisions regarding job redesign.

=== Diathesis-stress model ===
The diathesis–stress model looks the individual's susceptibility to stressful life experiences, i.e., the diathesis. Individuals differ on that diathesis or vulnerability. The model suggests that the individual's diathesis is part of the context in which he or she encounters job stressors at various levels of intensity. If the individual has a very high tolerance (is relatively invulnerable), an intense stressor may not lead to a mental or physical problem. However, if the stressor (e.g., high workload, difficult coworker relationship) outstrips the individual's diathesis, then health problems may ensue.

=== Job demands-resources model ===
In the job demands-resources model model derives from both conservation of resources theory and the DCS model. Demands refer to the size of the workload, as in the DCS model. Resources refer to the physical (e.g., equipment), psychological (e.g., the incumbent's job-related skills and knowledge), social (e.g., supportiveness of supervisors), and organizational resources (e.g., how much task-related discretion is given the worker) that are available to satisfactorily perform the job. High workloads and low levels of resources are related job strain.

== Factors related to the above mentioned psychological theories of occupational stress ==
- Role conflict involves the worker facing incompatible demands. Workers are pulled in conflicting directions in trying to respond to those demands.
- Role ambiguity refers to a lack of informational clarity with regard to the duties a worker's role in an organization requires. Like role conflict, role ambiguity is a source of strain.
- Coping refers to the individual's efforts to either prevent the occurrence of a stressor or mitigate the distress the impact of the stressor is likely to cause. Research on the ability of the employees to cope with the specific workplace stressors is equivocal; coping in the workplace may even be counterproductive. Pearlin and Schooler advanced the view that because work roles, unlike such personally organized roles as parent and spouse, tend to be impersonally organized, work roles are not a context conducive to successful coping. Pearlin and Schooler suggested that the impersonality of workplaces may even result in occupational coping efforts making conditions worse for the employee.
- Organizational climate refers to employees' collective or consensus appraisal of the organizational work environment. Organizational climate takes into account many dimensions of the work environment (e.g., safety climate; mistreatment climate; work-family climate). The communication, management style, and extent of worker participation in decision-making are factors that contribute to one or another type of organizational climate.

== Effects of work stress ==
=== Eustress causes ===
Examples of positive causes of stress in the workplace include starting a new job and receiving a pay raise. Both of these situations improve performance.

=== Distress causes ===
On the negative side, one cause of job strain is low salaries. Low pay causes job strain due to living expenses. Housing expenses are extremely high, which makes it difficult for minimum wage workers to afford housing. As the minimum wage increases, the cost of living increases as well.

The second cause of job strain comes from excessive workloads. Being exhausted from overworking is a common stressor in the workplace and can often lead to poor communication between coworkers. A 2019 survey by Cartridge People identified workload as the main cause of occupational stress.

A lack of support from employers and employees may also cause stress. Making decisions and participating is a way of support from employers and employees.

== Negative health and other effects ==
Physiological reactions to stress can have consequences for health over time. Researchers have been studying how stress affects the cardiovascular system, as well as how work stress can lead to hypertension and coronary artery disease. These diseases, along with other stress-induced illnesses tend to be quite common in American work-places. There are a number of physiological reactions to stress including the following:

- Blood is shunted to the brain and large muscle groups, and away from extremities and skin.
- Activity in an area near the brain stem known as the reticular activating system increases, causing a state of keen alertness as well as sharpening of hearing and vision.
- Epinephrine is released into the blood.
- The HPA axis is activated.
- There is increased activity in the sympathetic nervous system.
- Cortisol levels are elevated.
- Energy-providing compounds of glucose and fatty acids are released into the bloodstream.
- The action immune and digestive systems are temporarily reduced.

Studies have shown an association between occupational stress and "health risk behaviors". Occupational stress has shown to be linked with an increase in alcohol consumption among men and an increase in body weight.

When experiencing job strain in the form of distress at work, people are subject to headaches, stomachaches, sleep disturbances, short temper, and difficulty concentrating. Anxiety, insomnia, high blood pressure, a weakened immune system, and heart disease may occur if stress at work becomes more persistent. A 2012 meta-analysis found a positive association between job strain and coronary heart disease risk. A 2015 meta-analysis found a similar association between job strain and stroke; this association was especially strong for women. Time poverty has been found to heighten the risk for depression, inflated BMI, and cardiovascular disease in women. Job strain has been found to increase the risk of higher blood pressure, but not obesity.

Occupational stress accounts for more than 10% of work-related health claims. Many studies suggest that psychologically demanding jobs that allow employees little control over the work process increase the risk of cardiovascular disease. Research indicates that job stress increases the risk for development of back and upper-extremity musculoskeletal disorders. Stress at work can also increase the risk of acquiring an infection and the risk of accidents at work. A 2021 WHO study concluded that working 55+ hours a week raises the risk of stroke by 35% and the risk of dying from heart conditions by 17%, when compared to a 35-40 hour week.

Occupational stress can lead to three types of strains: behavioral (e.g., absenteeism), physical (e.g., headaches), and psychological (e.g., depressed mood). Job stress has been linked to a broad array of conditions, including psychological disorders (e.g., depression, anxiety, post-traumatic stress disorder), job dissatisfaction, maladaptive behaviors (e.g., substance abuse), cardiovascular disease, and musculoskeletal disorders.

Stressful job conditions can also lead to poor work performance, counterproductive work behavior, higher absenteeism, and injury. Chronically high levels of job stress diminish a worker's quality of life and increase the cost of the health benefits the employer provides. A study of short haul truckers found that high levels of job stress were related to increased risk of occupational injury. Research conducted in Japan showed a more than two-fold increase in the risk of stroke among men with job strain (combination of high job demand and low job control). The Japanese use the term karoshi to reflect death from overwork.

High levels of stress are associated with substantial increases in health service utilization. For example, workers who report experiencing stress at work also show excessive health care utilization. In a 1998 study of 46,000 workers, health care costs were nearly 50% greater for workers reporting high levels of stress in comparison to "low risk" workers. The increment rose to nearly 150%, an increase of more than $1,700 per person annually, for workers reporting high levels of both stress and depression. Health care costs increase by 200% in those with depression and high occupational stress. Additionally, periods of disability due to job stress tend to be much longer than disability periods for other occupational injuries and illnesses.

Occupational stress has negative effects for organizations and employers. Occupational stress contributes to turnover and absenteeism. Occupational stress can also contribute to occupational burnout, which the World Health Organization describes as resulting from chronic workplace stress that has not been successfully managed. Research evidence described in the Bulletin of the World Health Organization and elsewhere, however, indicates that burnout is a depressive phenomenon.

== Gender ==
In today's workplaces every individual will experience work-related stress and the level of stress varies person-to-person. Different aspects of a person's life will affect their stress levels through work. In comparing women and men, there is a higher risk for women to experience stress, anxiety and others forms of psychological stress in response to their work life than there is for men due to societal expectations of women. Such as women having more domestic responsibilities, the fact that women receive less pay for doing similar work as men and that societally women are expected to say "yes" to any requests given to them. These societal expectations added into a work environment can create a very psychologically stressful environment for women, without any added stressors from work. Desmarais and Alksnis suggest two explanations for the greater psychological distress of women. First, the genders may differ in their awareness of negative feelings, leading women to be more likely to express and report strains, whereas men more likely to deny and inhibit such feelings. Second, the demands to balance work and family result in more overall stress for women that leads to increased strain.

Stereotype threat is a phenomenon that can have effects on everyone, it highly depends on the situation the individual is. Some of the proposed mechanisms that are involved with stereotype threat include, but are not limited to: anxiety, negative cognition (where you are focused on stereotype-thinking), lowered motivation, lowered performance expectation (where you do worse on something because the expectation is that you won't be able to do well anyways), decrease in working memory capacity, etc.

Women are also more vulnerable to sexual harassment and assault than men. These authors are referring to the very real "double burden" hypothesis. In addition, women, on average, earn less than their male counterparts.

In 2012, a survey taken by Canadian Community Health showed that women experience higher job strain than men, and also that women feel they have lower levels of control and yet experience more coworker support than men. Because women have lower levels of control at work, they experience more mental health risks such as depression and anxiety. Men tend to suffer from physical risks such as heart disease from carrying higher roles at work.

According to a 2017 report by the European Union (EU), in the EU and affiliated countries the skills gap between men and women has narrowed in the ten years preceding 2015. In the EU, when compared to men, women typically spend fewer hours in paid work but instead spend more hours in unpaid work.

A 2021 WHO study concluded that working 55+ hours a week raises the risk of stroke by 35% and the risk of dying from heart conditions by 17%, when compared to a 35-hour to 40-hour work week.

A 2022 study by McKinsey & Company concluded that women are 41% more likely to be subjected to a toxic workplace culture and that their risk of burnout is elevated.

== Causes of occupational stress ==
Both the broad categories and the specific categories of occupational stress mentioned in the following paragraph fall under different psychological theories of worker stress, which include demand-control-support model, the effort-reward imbalance model, the person-environment fit model, job characteristics model, the diathesis stress model, and the job-demands resources model.

The causes of occupational stress can be placed into a broad category of what the main occupational stressor is and a more specific category of what causes occupational stress. The broad category of occupational stressors include some of the following: bad management practices, the job content and its demands, a lack of support or autonomy and much more. The more specific causes of occupational stress includes some of the following: working long hours, having insufficient skills for the job, discrimination and harassment and much more.

=== General working conditions ===
Although the importance of individual differences cannot be ignored, scientific evidence suggests that certain working conditions are stressful to most people. Such evidence argues for a greater emphasis on working conditions as the key source of job stress, and for job redesign as a primary prevention strategy. In the ten years leading up to 2015, workers in the EU and affiliated countries have seen improvement in noise exposure but worsening in exposure to chemicals. Approximately, one-third of EU workers experience tight deadlines and must work quickly. Those in the health sector are exposed to the highest levels of work intensity. In order to meet job demands, a little more than 20% of EU workers must work during their free time. Approximately one-third of EU office-workers have some decision latitude. By contrast, about 80% of managers have significant levels of latitude.

General working conditions that induce occupational stress may also be aspects of the physical environment of one's job. For example, the noise level, lighting, and temperature are all components of one's working environment. If these factors are not adequate for a successful working environment, one can experience changes in mood and arousal, which in turn creates more difficulty to successfully do the job right.

=== Workload ===
In an occupational setting, dealing with workload can be stressful and serve as a stressor for employees. There are three aspects of workload that can be stressful.

- Quantitative workload or overload: Having more work to do than can be accomplished comfortably, like stress related with deadline or unrealistic target.
- Qualitative workload: Having work that is too difficult.
- Underload: Having work that fails to use a worker's skills and abilities.

Workload as a work demand is a major component of the demand-control model of stress. This model suggests that jobs with high demands can be stressful, especially when the individual has low control over the job. In other words, control serves as a buffer or protective factor when demands or workload is high. This model was expanded into the demand-control-support model that suggests that the combination of high control and high social support at work buffers the effects of high demands.

As a work demand, workload is also relevant to the job demands-resources model of stress that suggests that jobs are stressful when demands (e.g., workload) exceed the individual's resources to deal with them. With the growth of industries and the emergence of modern industries, the cognitive workload has increased even more. It seems that with the stability of Industry 4, more serious problems will arise in this field.

=== Long hours ===
According to the U.S. Bureau of Labor Statistics in 2022, 12,000,000 Americans or 8.7% of the labor force worked 41–48 hours per week. And 13,705,000 Americans or 9.8% of the labor force worked 49–59 hours per week. And approximately 9,181,000 Americans or 6.7% of the labor force worked 60 or more hours per week. A meta-analysis involving more than 600,000 individuals and 25 studies indicated that, controlling for confounding factors, working long hours is related to a small but significantly higher risk of cardiovascular disease and slightly higher risk of stroke.

=== Status ===
A person's status in the workplace is related to occupational stress because jobs associated with lower socioeconomic status (SES) typically provide workers less control and greater insecurity than higher-SES jobs. Lower levels of job control and greater job insecurity are related to reduced mental and physical health.

=== Salary ===
The types of jobs that pay workers higher salaries tend to provide them with greater job-related autonomy. As indicated above, job-related autonomy is associated with better health. A problem in research on occupational stress is how to "unconfound" the relationship between stressful working conditions, such as low levels of autonomy, and salary. Because higher levels of income buy resources (e.g., better insurance, higher quality food) that help to improve or maintain health, researchers need to better specify the extent to which differences in working conditions and differences in pay affect health.

=== Workplace bullying ===
Workplace bullying involves the chronic mistreatment of a worker by one or more other workers or managers. Bullying involves a power imbalance in which the target has less power in the unit or the organization than the bully or bullies. Bullying is neither a one-off episode nor is a conflict between two workers who are equals in terms of power. There has to be a power imbalance for there to be bullying. Bullying tactics include verbal abuse, psychological abuse, and even physical abuse. The adverse effects of workplace bullying include depression for the worker and lost productivity for the organization.

=== Narcissism and psychopathy ===
Thomas suggests that there tends to be a higher level of stress with people who work or interact with a narcissist, which in turn increases absenteeism and staff turnover. Boddy finds the same dynamic where there is a corporate psychopath in the organisation.

=== Workplace conflict ===
Interpersonal conflict among people at work has been shown to be one of the most frequently noted stressors for employees. Conflict can be precipitated by workplace harassment. Workplace conflict is also associated with other stressors, such as role conflict, role ambiguity, and heavy workload. Conflict has also been linked to strains such as anxiety, depression, physical symptoms, and low levels of job satisfaction.

=== Sexual harassment ===
A review of the literature indicates that sexual harassment, which principally affects women, negatively affects workers' psychological well-being. Other findings suggest that women who experience higher levels of harassment are more likely to perform poorly at work.

Sexual harassment can affect individuals of any gender, and the harasser can also be of any gender; the harasser does not need to be of the opposite sex. While a harasser may hold a higher position, this is not always the case. Harassment can occur from a co-worker, someone in a different department, or even an individual who is not an employee.

Sexual harassment includes but is not limited to:

- sexual assault
  - nonconsensual contact
  - rape
  - attempted rape
  - forcing the victim to perform sexual acts on the attacker
- sending sexually explicit photos or messages to someone else
- exposing oneself to another
- performing sexual acts on self
- verbal harassment
  - includes jokes referencing sexual acts
  - discussing sexual relations, sexual stories or sexual fantasies

=== Work–life balance ===
Work–life balance refers to the extent to which there is equilibrium between work demands and one's personal life outside of work. Workers face increasing challenges to meeting workplace demands and fulfilling their family roles as well as other roles outside of work.

=== Occupational group ===
Lower status occupational groups are at higher risk of work-related ill health than higher occupational groups. This is in part due to adverse work and employment conditions. Furthermore, such conditions have greater effects on ill-health to those in lower socio-economic positions.

== Prevention/Intervention ==
A combination of organizational change and stress management can be a useful approach for alleviating or preventing stress at work. Both organizations and employees can employ strategies at organizational and individual levels. Generally, organizational level strategies include job procedure modification and employee assistance programs (EAP). A meta-analysis of experimental studies found that cognitive-behavioral interventions, in comparison to relaxation and organizational interventions, provided the largest effect with regard to improving workers' symptoms of psychological distress. A systematic review of stress-reduction techniques among healthcare workers found that cognitive behavioral training lowered emotional exhaustion and feelings of lack of personal accomplishment.

An occupational stressor that needs to be addressed is the problem of an imbalance between work and life outside of work. The Work, Family, and Health Study was a large-scale intervention study, the purpose of which was to help insure that employees achieve a measure of work–life balance. The intervention strategies included training supervisors to engage in more family-supportive behaviors. Another study component provided employees with increased control over when and where they work. The intervention led to improved home life, better sleep quality, and better safety compliance, mainly for the lowest paid employees.

Many organizations manage occupational stressors associated with health and safety in a fragmented way; for example, one department may house an employee assistance program and another department manages exposures to toxic chemicals. The Total Worker Health (TWH) idea, which was initiated by the National Institute of Occupational Safety and Health (NIOSH), provides a strategy in which different levels of worker health promotion activity are programmatically integrated. TWH-type interventions integrate health protection and health promotion components. Health protection components are ordinarily unit- or organization-wide, for example, reducing exposures to aerosols. Health promotion components are more individually oriented, in other words, oriented toward the wellness and/or well-being of individual workers, for example, smoking cessation programs. A review of 17 TWH-type interventions, i.e., interventions that integrate organizational-level occupational safety/health components and individual employee health promotion components, indicated that integrated programs can improve worker health and safety.

Experts from NIOSH recommended a number of practical ways to reduce occupational stress. These include the following:

- Ensure that the workload is in line with workers' capabilities and resources.
- Design jobs to provide meaning, stimulation, and opportunities for workers to use their skills.
- Clearly define workers' roles and responsibilities.
- To reduce workplace stress, managers may monitor the workload given out to the employees. Also while they are being trained they should let employees understand and be notified of stress awareness.
- Give workers opportunities to participate in decisions and actions affecting their jobs.
- Improve communications-reduce uncertainty about career development and future employment prospects.
- Provide opportunities for social interaction among workers.
- Establish work schedules that are compatible with demands and responsibilities outside the job.
- Combat workplace discrimination (based on race, gender, national origin, religion or language).
- Bringing in an objective outsider such as a consultant to suggest a fresh approach to persistent problems.
- Introducing a participative leadership style to involve as many people as possible to resolve stress-producing problems.
- Encourage work–life balance through family-friendly benefits and policies

An insurance company conducted several studies on the effects of stress prevention programs in hospital settings. Program activities included (1) employee and management education on job stress, (2) changes in hospital policies and procedures to reduce organizational sources of stress, and (3) the establishment of employee assistance programs. In one study, the frequency of medication errors declined by 50% after prevention activities were implemented in a 700-bed hospital. In a second study, there was a 70% reduction in malpractice claims in 22 hospitals that implemented stress prevention activities. In contrast, there was no reduction in claims in a matched group of 22 hospitals that did not implement stress prevention activities.

There is evidence that remote work could reduce job stress. One reason is that it provides employees more control over how they complete their work. Remote workers reported more job satisfaction and less desire to find a new job, less stress, improved work/life balance and higher performance rating by their managers.

One study modeled scenario-based training as a means to reduce occupational stress by providing simulated experience prior to performing a task.

A pilot and feasibility study in the UK investigated the potential for self-directed visits to heritage sites to promote the wellbeing, compassion and work engagement for NHS staff who did not meet the clinical thresholds for support. Such visits were found to be a scalable and sustainable public health intervention.

=== Signs and symptoms of excessive job and workplace stress ===
Signs and symptoms of excessive job and workplace stress include:

- Anxiety
- Depressed mood
- Irritability
- Apathy, loss of interest in work
- Problems sleeping
- Fatigue
- Trouble concentrating
- Muscle tension
- Headaches
- Stomach problems
- Social withdrawal
- Loss of sex drive
- Excessive use alcohol or drugs

=== Occupations concerned with reducing job stress ===
According to the Centers for Disease Control and Prevention, occupational health psychology (OHP) has made occupational stress a major research focus. Occupational health psychologists seek to reduce occupational stress by working with individuals and changing the workplace to make it less stressful. Industrial and organizational psychologists also have skills that bear on occupational stress (e.g., job design), they can also contribute to alleviating job stress. Other subdisciplines within psychology had been largely absent from research on occupational stress.

The CDC states that "many psychologists have argued that the psychology field needs to take a more active role in research and practice to prevent occupational stress, illness, and injury," which is what the relatively new field of occupational health psychology is "all about".

== Occupational stress in the United Kingdom ==
An estimated 440,000 people in the UK say they experience work-related stress, resulting in nearly 9.9 million lost work days from 2014 to 2015. This makes it one of the most important causes of lost working-days in the UK. To reduce the prevalence of occupational stress, the Health and Safety Executive (HSE) has published the Management Standards, which is used by workplaces to assess the risk of work-related stress. Other methods used by the HSE to reduce occupational stress in the UK include "maintaining and enhancing the enforcement profile on work-related ill health to highlight the consequences of failure, and to hold those responsible to account".

== Occupational stress in the United States ==
The Occupational Safety and Health Administration (OSHA) estimates that 83% of US workers suffer from work-related stress, with 65% of US workers reporting that work was a "very significant or somewhat significant source of stress in each year from 2019-2021." An estimated 120,000 deaths per year are caused by occupational stress in the United States. A number of programs to research and implement interventions to reduce occupational stress have been established by US government agencies, such as the National Institute for Occupational Safety and Health (NIOSH) and OSHA, including the Healthy Work Design and Well-being Cross-Sector program.

== Occupational stress in Japan ==
Across 12 industries, 10.2 - 27.6% of Japanese employees have demonstrated severe levels of occupational stress. The high prevalence of severe occupational stress among workers in Japan leads to hundreds of thousands in human capital loss per employee throughout their careers. The Japanese term "Karoshi" refers to "overwork death", a case in which a sudden death is caused by a factor related to ones occupation, such as occupational stress. Concerns regarding occupational stress in Japan have grown over the years, due to societal factors such as long working hours. These concerns are being addressed through a number of national programs such as the government-mandated Stress Check Program, which requires all companies with more than 50 employees to assess the stress of its employees at least once a year.

== Occupational stress in South Africa ==
In South Africa, over 40% of all work-related illness is caused by occupational stress, resulting in billions of rands in lost production annually. While occupational stress is rising globally, Sub-Saharan African countries have been among the worst affected regions in the world. The Occupational Health and Safety Act of 1993 established legal policy to encourage worker health in South Africa, but included few measures to manage stress among South African workers. Long working hours and inability to control work situations contribute to high rates of occupational stress among the many South Africans working in construction and labor professions.

== See also ==
- Annual leave
- Cognitive load
- Critique of work
- Effects of overtime
- Four-day workweek
- Industrial and organizational psychology
- Karoshi
- Kick the cat
- Kiss up kick down
- Labor rights
- Meditation
- Occupational burnout
- Occupational health psychology
- Occupational Health Science (journal)
- Occupational safety and health
- Paid time off
- Perceived organizational support
- Perceived psychological contract violation
- Psychoneuroimmunology
- Refusal of work
- Right to rest and leisure
- Six-hour day
- Stress management
- Stress (psychological)
- Wage slavery
- Work–life interface
