= Centre for Occupational and Health Psychology =

Welsh research institute

Coordinates: 51.48934°N 3.181°W

Centre for Occupational & Health Psychology
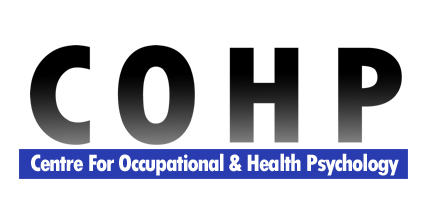
- Cardiff, Wales; United Kingdom

Information
- Faculty: Psychology
- Website: Official website

The Centre for Occupational and Health Psychology (COHP, Welsh: Canolfan Seicoleg Alwedigaethol ac Iechyd) is a Cardiff University research centre founded in 1999 to conduct research into the effects of occupational factors on health and performance efficiency. In addition, the risk factors relating to ill-health are investigated and the effects of health-related behaviour and health status on cognitive performance, mood and physiological functioning examined.

The Unit is directed by Professor Andy Smith and research is conducted by post-doctoral fellows, research associates and post-graduate students.

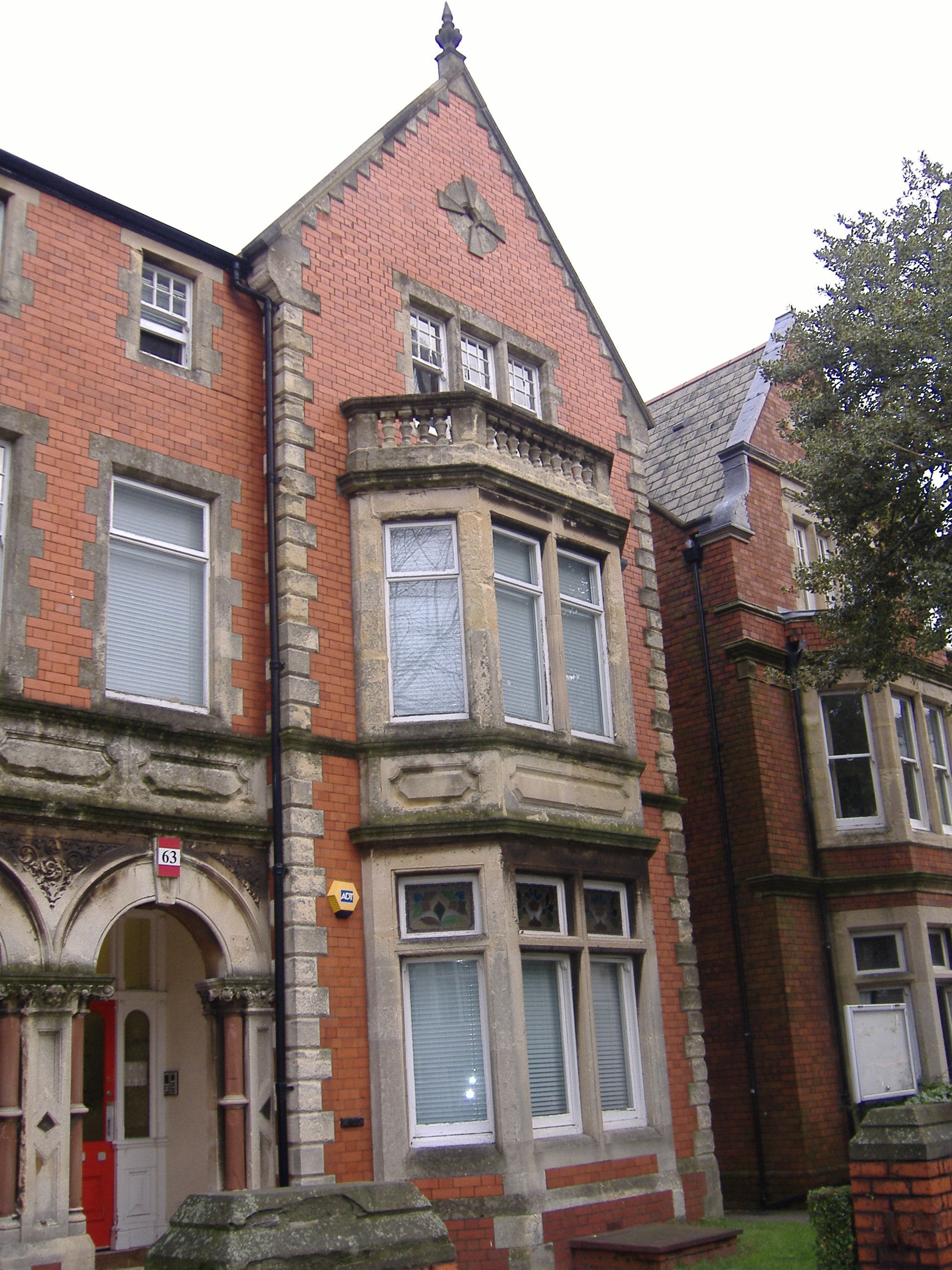
Centre for Occupational & Health Psychology building, Cardiff

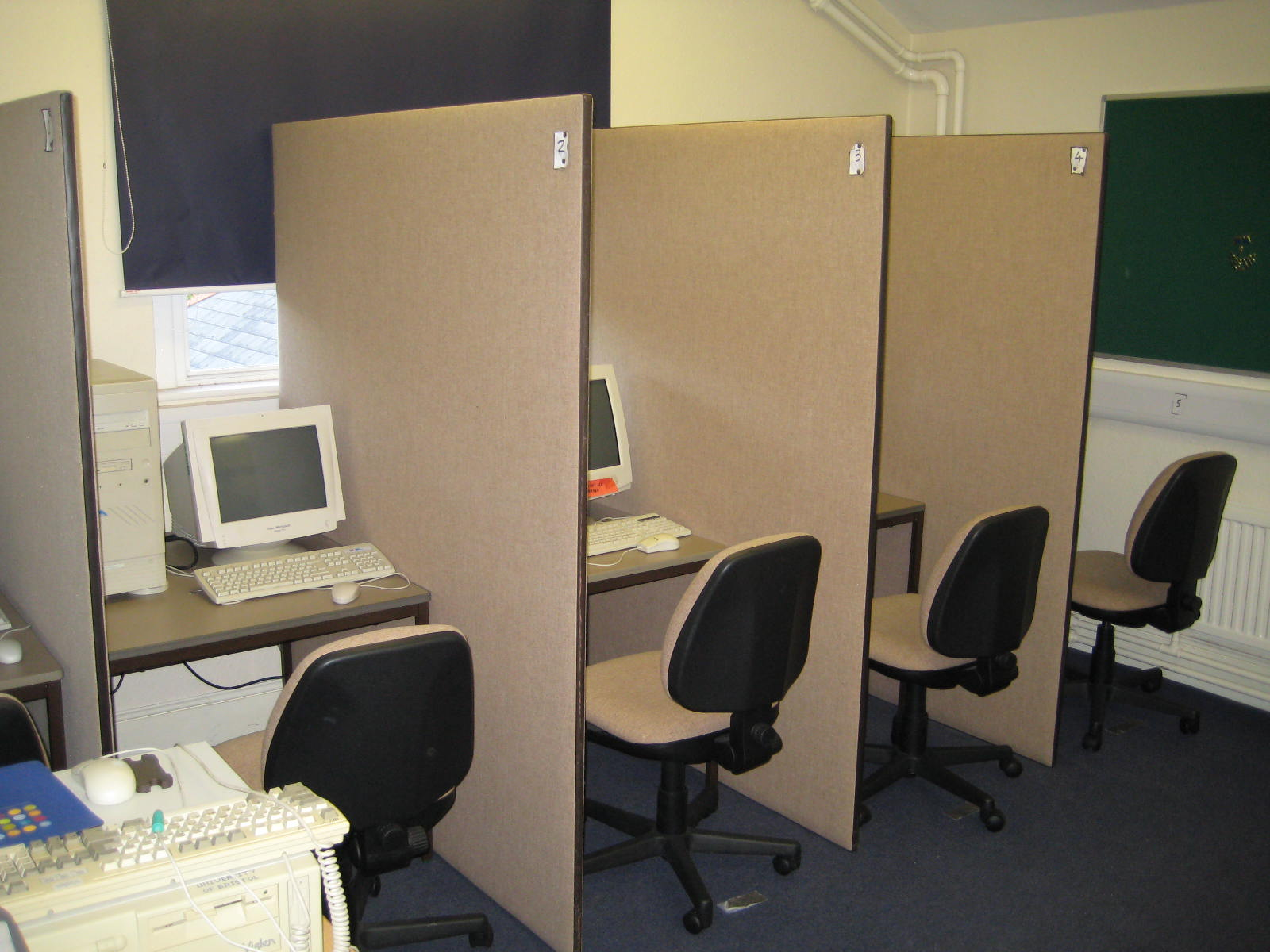
Centre for Occupational & Health Psychology performance testing lab

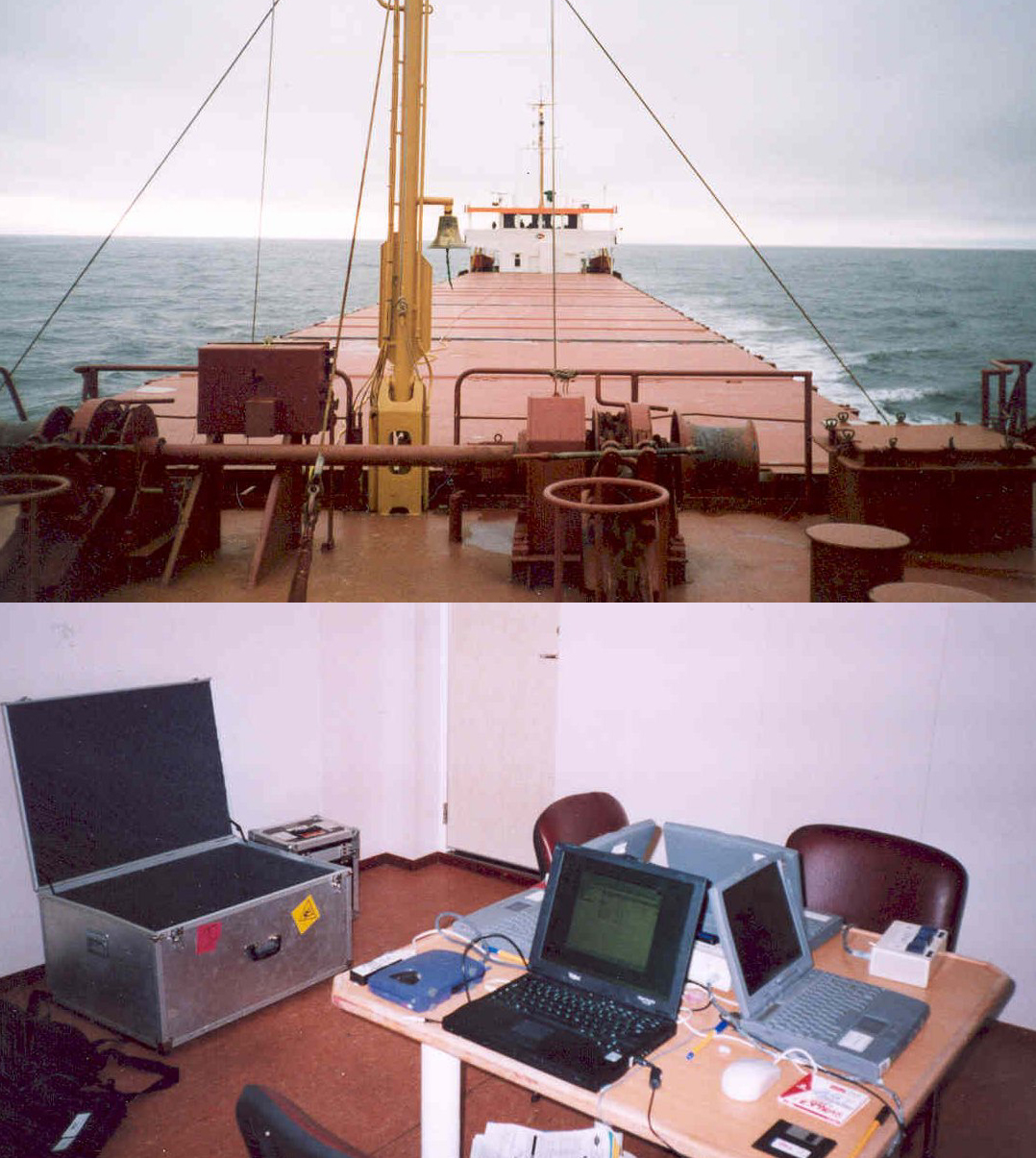
Onboard field research looking at seafarers' fatigue

== Topics of research ==
Previous research projects have included:

1. Minor illnesses and cognition
2. The Psychology of the common cold
3. The scale and impact of illegal drug use by workers
4. Ethnicity, work characteristics, stress and health
5. Seafarer Fatigue: The Cardiff Research Programme
6. The acute effects of inulin on subjective reports of well-being and objective measures of cognitive performance
7. Evaluation of free school breakfasts initiative
8. An investigation of the effects of breakfast cereals on well-being
9. Seafarers' Fatigue: The International Perspective
10. European Framework for safe, efficient and environmentally-friendly ship operations (FLAGSHIP)
11. Healthy Minds at Work

== See also ==
- Occupational health psychology
- European Academy of Occupational Health Psychology
- Society for Occupational Health Psychology
