= International Journal of Stress Management =

- Discipline: Stress management
- Language: English
- Edited by: Oi Ling Siu

Publication details
- History: 2003-present
- Publisher: American Psychological Association on behalf of the International Stress Management Association
- Frequency: Quarterly
- Impact factor: 4.0 (2022)

Standard abbreviations
- ISO 4: Int. J. Stress Manag.

Indexing
- CODEN: ISMAE8
- ISSN: 1072-5245 (print); 1573-3424 (web)
- LCCN: 94648209
- OCLC no.: 44461463

Links
- Journal homepage; Online access

The International Journal of Stress Management is a quarterly peer-reviewed academic journal published by the American Psychological Association on behalf of the International Stress Management Association. The journal was established in 2003 and covers research on all aspects of stress management.

== Abstracting and indexing ==
The journal is abstracted and indexed in Scopus, PsycINFO, and CINAHL. According to the Journal Citation Reports, the journal has a 2022 impact factor of 4.0.

== See also ==
- Industrial and organizational psychology
- Occupational health psychology
- Society for Occupational Health Psychology
