= Employee assistance program =

Employee benefit program

An employee assistance program in the United States generally offers free and confidential assessments, short-term counseling, referrals, and follow-up services for employees. EAP counselors may also work in a consultative role with managers and supervisors to address employee and organizational challenges and needs. Many corporations, academic institution and/or government agencies are active in helping organizations prevent and cope with workplace violence, trauma, and other emergency response situations. There is a variety of support programs offered for employees. Even though EAPs are mainly aimed at work-related issues, there are a variety of programs that can assist with problems outside of the workplace. EAPs have grown in popularity over the years.

== History ==
=== Early formation ===
EAPs have their origins in the late 1930s, and were formed out of programs that dealt with occupational alcoholism. During a time when drinking on the job was the norm, people began to notice the effects it had on job performance and productivity. This became a major issue for industrial jobs and would become the main focus for correction with job-based alcoholism programs. By 1939, the Alcoholics Anonymous (AA) movement had begun to spread throughout the Midwestern and Northeastern United States. People in “recovery" began to eagerly share their experiences with other workers. This would be the start of the EAP movement. Businesses also started to see the effectiveness of the programs through the rehabilitation of their workers and the rise of productivity. These improvements sparked the thought of what other types of problems this program could address.

=== Taking shape ===
In 1962, The Kemper Group introduced a program to address alcoholic rehabilitation and later expanded the program to address the needs of the families of their employees as well. Including the families broaden the programs services to deal with marital, emotional, financial, legal, and drug abuse problems. In 1969, Senator Harold Hughes would introduce a bill called The Hughes Act. Sen. Hughes felt that there was a great lack of federal and state involvement in the treatment of alcoholism. In 1970, Congress would pass the Federal Comprehensive Alcohol Abuse and Alcoholism Prevention Treatment and Rehabilitation Act creating the National Institute on Alcoholism and Alcohol Abuse (NIAAA). States would then soon begin to follow suit and denounce public intoxication and began treating alcoholism as a disease. The NIAAA priority would be to begin researching and treating alcoholism. They were also focused on providing states with grants to hire and train EAP specialist.

In the 1970s, the Occupational Alcoholism Bureau formed by the National Council on Alcoholism (NCA) and the Association of Labor and Management Administrators and Consultants on Alcoholism (ALMACA) helped to spread EAP concepts. They did this by distributing information, giving conferences and seminars, increasing the knowledge of professionals and the community. A number of treatment centers would also grow after the passing of the Hughes Act. These centers have EAP specialist on site to help in the rehabilitation processes. It is not known the exact amount of treatment centers in the United States.

=== Economic crisis cutbacks ===
Employee Assistance Programs would see a significant shift during the austerity of the 1980s. During this time, the conservative Reagan-led government cut funding for many beneficial programs. This forced mental health public agencies, treatment centers, and private counseling firms to survive by partnering with industry wanting to enter the EAP field. This caused the effectiveness of the programs to come into question. The cutbacks began to affect the training of the EAP specialist and their effectiveness. The situations of workers also began to change at this time. People were also having to wait in lines, and were having to search for work due to the crisis.

=== Post September 11 ===
In most recent years, the services provided by EAPs have changed in their direction. With events occurring in the United States and around the world has caused for EAPs to rise and the need for them greater in the United States. EAPs have also been affected by technology, terrorism attacks, natural disasters, disabilities act, and workplace violence. Since the events of September 11, 2001, EAP specialists have become more involved in incident debriefing and implementing plans during emergencies Providers began to report more on the workforce experiencing Post Traumatic Stress Disorder (PTSD), and an increase in occupational stress and depression.

== Benefits ==
Some studies indicate that offering EAPs may result in various benefits for employers, including lower medical costs, reduced turnover and absenteeism, and higher employee productivity. Critics of these studies question the scientific validity of their findings, noting small sample sizes, lack of experimental control groups, and lack of standardized measures as primary concerns. Proponents, however, argue that the consistency of positive findings across studies in different service sectors denote at least some positive effect of programs, even if the most effective components of such programs have not been determined. EAPs may also provide other services to employers, such as supervisory consultations, support to troubled work teams, training and education programs, and critical incident services.

The provision of employee assistance services has established business benefits, including increased productivity of employees, and a decrease in both presenteeism and absenteeism. Employees typically have access to an EAP hotline 24 hours a day, so there is no need to wait to seek assistance. If an appointment with a medical professional or counselor is necessary, the employee can arrange to see one in just a few days. Because the employee can call anytime, they do not have to worry about calling from a work phone. You may also be able to minimize the cost of your health insurance plan, because employees can use the EAP to ward off stress-related illnesses, meaning fewer trips to the doctor.

Small businesses can especially benefit from EAP programs. Even though they may have fewer employees and may not see the need to implement an EAP program, small business owner's bottom line can suffer quicker due to decreased performance and productivity and workplace negativity. A small company could be severely damaged if they do not seek effective measures to rectify such issues. An employer that provides an effective, full-service EAP can help both themselves and employees by lowering risk and liability, improving employee satisfaction, and especially decreasing the stress small business owners experience when managing numerous responsibilities with little support.

Benefits of EAP are:

- Direct Access: Employees call the psychologist's office directly.
- Quick Response: The first counseling session occurs within a few days, and a crisis is dealt with immediately.
- Professional: Counselors are typically qualified psychologists, and are experts in human behavior.
- Confidentiality: The employer never knows who uses the service.
- Off-Site: Counseling takes place at the psychologist's office.
- Direct Treatment: Referrals are made only when the patient requires another specialist or long-term care.
- Appropriate Coverage: 24 hours a day hot-line with offices in towns and cities in which employees are located

== Service ==
Employees and their family members may use EAPs to help manage issues in their personal lives. EAP counselors typically provide assessment, support, and referrals to additional resources such as counselors for a limited number of program-paid counseling sessions. The issues for which EAPs provide support vary, but examples include:

- substance abuse
- occupational stress
- emotional distress
- major life events, including births, accidents and deaths
- health care concerns
- financial or non-work-related legal concerns
- family/personal relationship issues
- work relationship issues
- concerns about aging parents

An EAP's services are usually free to the employee and their household members, having been prepaid by the employer. In most cases, an employer contracts with a third-party company to manage its EAP. Some of these companies rely upon other vendors or contracted employees for specialized services to supplement their own services, such as: financial advisors, attorneys, travel agents, elder/child care specialists, and the like.

Confidentiality is maintained in accordance with privacy laws and ethical standards.

In the United States, California requires EAP providers who deliver actual counseling services on a pre-paid basis for more than 3 sessions within any six-month period to have a Knox-Keene license. This is a specialty license for psychological services and is mandated by the Knox-Keene Health Care Service Plan Act of 1975. The state's Department of Managed Health Care regulates these licensed plans and assists consumers with regard to grievances, access to quality care, and ensuring that the EAP has an appropriate level of tangible net equity to deliver services to plan members. Title 28, Rule 1300.43.14 of the California Code of Regulations allows EAPs without a Knox-Keene license to request an exemption if they solely refer callers to external services and do not provide the actual services themselves.

Each Federal Executive Branch agency has an Employee Assistance Program (EAP). An EAP is a voluntary, confidential program that helps employees (including management) work through various life challenges that may adversely affect job performance, health, and personal well-being to optimize an organization's success. EAP services include assessments, counseling, and referrals for additional services to employees with personal and/or work-related concerns, such as stress, financial issues, legal issues, family problems, office conflicts, and alcohol and substance abuse. EAPs also often work with management and supervisors providing advanced planning for situations, such as organizational changes, legal considerations, emergency planning, and response to unique traumatic events. EAP’s can reap benefits for agencies, employees, families and communities. Some of those aspects that we will be focusing on are: the improvement of productivity and employee engagement, improving employees’ and dependents’ abilities to successfully respond to challenges, developing employee and manager competencies in managing workplace stress, reducing workplace absenteeism and unplanned absences, supporting employees and managers during workforce restructuring, reduction-in-forces, or other workforce change events, reducing workplace accidents, reducing the likelihood of workplace violence or other safety risks, supporting disaster and emergency preparedness, managing the effect of disruptive incidents, such as workplace, injury, or other crises, facilitating safe, timely, and effective return-to-work for employees short-term and extended absences, reducing healthcare costs associated with stress, depression, and other mental health issues, reducing employee turnover and related replacement costs.

== Military/veterans ==
There are a variety of employee assistance programs in the military, ranging from financial assistance programs, family counseling, depression, and transitional assistance programs. One of the largest military employee assistance organizations is Military One Source. Military One Source offers both services directly to service members and their families, but can also help send people to places in the community if there is a specific need. If someone is in need of assistance and is: an active duty service member, family member of a service member, a veteran, or family member of a veteran, they can find additional information about the assistance programs offered by Military One Source on their website.

In the last couple decades military employee assistance programs have expanded greatly. What started as alcohol assistance programs has grown to help people with financial issues, physical health, family health, and since 2000 mental health programs have expanded rapidly as more has become known about Post Traumatic Stress Disorder (PTSD), and Traumatic Brain Injuries (TBI). There are several programs for families, and increasing assistance for dual military families, families in which both spouses are active duty military, as they have grown dramatically in number. Financial programs have been expanded as well, as payday loan establishments grew in popularity in the 2000s; and as a result, debt among military members has grown as well. The Navy-Marine Corps Relief Society (NMCRS), is a program started by military members to help other members that have fallen into debt, and has expanded to also help service members reach educational goals. This society has helped many service members, as a service member can borrow up to 300 dollars without a reason, and more with a valid reason for either no interest or low interest depending on how much and how long they borrow for. The Navy-Marine Corps Relief Society has helped many members of the military when unforeseen problems arise.

One of the largest veteran employee assistance programs is the Veterans Affairs (VA). The VA provides a variety of services to veterans including: health care, education assistance, transitional housing assistance, mental health, financial assistance, women veterans assistance, and career search assistance. The Veteran Affairs is a nationwide system that provides their services to all veterans who attained any discharge other than dishonorable.

== See also ==
- Human Intervention Motivation Study
- Industrial and organizational psychology
- Occupational health psychology
- Work-life balance
- Workplace interventions
- Workplace stress
- Workplace wellness
