= European Academy of Occupational Health Psychology =

European research organization

The European Academy of Occupational Health Psychology (EA-OHP) is a pan-European organization that was established in 1999. Along with the International Commission on Occupational Health's scientific committee on Work Organisation and Psychosocial Factors, EA-OHP is one of the first organizations of its kind to be devoted to occupational health psychology (OHP).

The activities of EA-OHP are centered on research, practice, and education. The Academy organizes a major biennial international conference on OHP and publishes the journal Work & Stress. EA-OHP also publishes a newsletter, The Occupational Health Psychologist, three times a year to keep the membership abreast of developments in the field. The organization runs regional workshops to benefit its members and other professionals. EA-OHP also runs a listserv that promotes communication about research, practice, and teaching bearing on work, stress, and health. Beginning with an agreement in 2008, the Academy coordinates member benefits and international conferences with the Society for Occupational Health Psychology (SOHP), a U.S. organization.

== Historical development ==
In 1997 representatives from the University of Nottingham and the departments of Occupational Medicine at two Danish hospitals, Skive Syghus and Herning Syghus, wrote an enabling document that laid the foundation for an organizing committee, the purpose of which was to create a European organization dedicated to supporting "research, teaching and practice" in OHP. EA-OHP came into existence in 1999. The organization operated out of the Institute of Work, Health and Organisations, at the University of Nottingham, under Tom Cox's leadership and "actively supported by a pan-European team of individuals and institutions." The Academy developed working groups in research, teaching, and practice.

EA-OHP's leading activity was organizing annual conferences that facilitated the sharing of research findings and educational and practice information. Attendance at the Academy's conferences increased steadily. By 2006, EA-OHP conference series became biennial. By way of an agreement reached in 2008 with their U.S. counterparts in the Society for Occupational Health Psychology (SOHP), the Academy now coordinates its conference series with the APA/NIOSH/SOHP Work, Stress, and Health conference series. The first EA-OHP conference was attended mainly by academics, but the conference series increasingly attracted practitioners and graduate students as well as occupational safety and health practitioners. In 2000, the journal Work & Stress, which was founded in 1987 by Tom Cox, became associated with the Academy. Other activities include the publication of conference proceedings and a book series.

== See also ==
- Centre for Occupational and Health Psychology
- Health psychology
- Industrial and organizational psychology
- International Commission on Occupational Health
- International Journal of Stress Management
- Journal of Occupational Health Psychology
- Society for Occupational Health Psychology
- Work & Stress
