= Journal of Occupational Health Psychology =

- Discipline: Occupational health psychology
- Language: English
- Edited by: Sharon Clarke, PhD

Publication details
- History: 1996–present
- Publisher: American Psychological Association (United States)
- Frequency: Bimonthly
- Impact factor: 7.707 (2021)

Standard abbreviations
- ISO 4: J. Occup. Health Psychol.

Indexing
- ISSN: 1076-8998 (print); 1939-1307 (web)
- LCCN: 96660070
- OCLC no.: 30635227

Links
- Journal homepage; Online access

The Journal of Occupational Health Psychology is a peer-reviewed academic journal published bimonthly by the American Psychological Association. It "publishes research, theory, and public policy articles in occupational health psychology, an interdisciplinary field representing a broad range of backgrounds, interests, and specializations. Occupational health psychology concerns the application of psychology to improving the quality of work life and to protecting and promoting the safety, health, and well-being of workers." The current editor-in-chief is Sharon Clarke, PhD.

== History ==
The idea for the journal emerged in discussions that took place in the 1990s among Steven Sauter and his colleagues at the National Institute for Occupational Safety and Health, Gary VandenBos (American Psychological Association), and James Campbell Quick (University of Texas at Arlington). With Quick named as editor-in-chief, the journal was first published in 1996. It "focuses on the work environment, the individual, and the work-family interface." It is published by the American Psychological Association.

== Abstracting and indexing ==
The journal is abstracted and indexed in:

- Applied Social Sciences Index & Abstracts
- Current Contents
- EMBASE/Exerpta Medica
- Index Medicus/MEDLINE/PubMed
- International Bibliography of the Social Sciences
- PASCAL
- PsycINFO
- Scopus
- Social Sciences Citation Index
- Sociological Abstracts

According to the Journal Citation Reports, the journal has a 2021 impact factor of 7.707.

== See also ==
- European Academy of Occupational Health Psychology
- Health psychology
- Occupational medicine
- Occupational stress
- Society for Occupational Health Psychology
- Work & Stress
