= Occupational health psychology =

Health and Safety psychology

Occupational health psychology (OHP) is an interdisciplinary area of psychology that is concerned with the health and safety of workers. OHP addresses a number of major topic areas including the impact of occupational stressors on physical and mental health, the impact of involuntary unemployment on physical and mental health, work–family balance, workplace violence and other forms of job-related mistreatment, psychosocial workplace factors that affect accident risk and safety, and interventions designed to improve and/or protect worker health. Although OHP emerged from two distinct disciplines within applied psychology, namely, health psychology and industrial and organizational (I–O) psychology, historical evidence suggests that the origins of OHP also lie in occupational health/occupational medicine. For many years the psychology establishment, including leaders of I–O psychology, rarely dealt with occupational stress and employee health, creating a need for the emergence of OHP.

OHP has also been informed by other disciplines. These disciplines include sociology, industrial engineering, and economics, as well as preventive medicine and public health. OHP is thus concerned with the relationship of psychosocial workplace factors to the development, maintenance, and promotion of workers' health and that of their families. For example, the World Health Organization and the International Labour Organization estimated that exposure to long working hours, a risk factor extensively studied by researchers allied to OHP, led 745,000 workers to die from ischemic heart disease and stroke in 2016. The impact of long work days is likely mediated by occupational stress, suggesting that less burdensome working conditions are needed to better protect the health of workers.

== Historical overview ==
=== Origins ===
The Industrial Revolution prompted thinkers, such as Karl Marx with his theory of alienation, to concern themselves with the nature of work and its impact on workers. Taylor's (1911) Principles of Scientific Management as well as Mayo's research in the late 1920s and early 1930s on workers at the Hawthorne Western Electric plant helped to inject the impact of work on workers into the subject matter psychology addresses. About the time Taylorism arose, Hartness reconsidered worker-machine interaction and its impact on worker psychology. The creation in 1948 of the Institute for Social Research (ISR) at the University of Michigan was important because of ISR's research on occupational stress and employee health.

Research published in the 1950s and extending to the 1970s helped lead to the emergence of OHP. For example, in the U.K. Trist and Bamforth (1951) found that the reduction in miner autonomy that accompanied organizational changes in English coal mining operations adversely affected morale. Arthur Kornhauser's work in the early 1960s on the mental health of automobile workers in Michigan also contributed to the development of the field. A 1971 study by Gardell examined the impact of work organization on mental health in Swedish pulp and paper mill workers and engineers. Research on the impact of unemployment on mental health was conducted at the University of Sheffield's Institute of Work Psychology. In 1970 Kasl and Cobb documented the impact of unemployment on blood pressure in U.S. factory workers.

=== Recognition as a field of study ===
Several individuals are associated with independently creating the term "occupational health psychology" or "occupational health psychologist." They include Ferguson for his 1977 conference paper and 1981 publication, Feldman (1985) and his colleague Everly (1986), and Raymond, Wood, and Patrick (1990). In 1988, in response to a dramatic increase in the number of stress-related worker compensation claims in the U.S., the National Institute for Occupational Safety and Health (NIOSH) "recognized stress-related psychological disorders as a leading occupational health risk" (p. 201). With the increased recognition of the impact of job stress on a range of problems, NIOSH found that their stress-related programs were significantly increasing in prominence. In 1990, Raymond et al. argued in the widely read American Psychologist that the time has come for doctoral-level psychologists to get interdisciplinary OHP training, integrating health psychology with public health, because creating healthy workplaces should be a goal for psychology.

=== Emergence as a discipline ===
With its appearance in 1987, Work & Stress is the first and "longest established journal in the fast developing discipline that is occupational health psychology." Three years later, the American Psychological Association (APA) and NIOSH jointly organized the Work, Stress, and Health Conference in Washington, DC, the first international conference devoted to OHP. The conference has since become biennial. In 1996, the first issue of the Journal of Occupational Health Psychology was published by APA. That same year, the International Commission on Occupational Health created the Work Organisation and Psychosocial Factors (ICOH-WOPS) scientific committee, which focused primarily on OHP. In 1999, the European Academy of Occupational Health Psychology (EA–OHP) was established at the first European Workshop on Occupational Health Psychology in Lund, Sweden. That workshop is considered to be the first EA–OHP conference, the first of a continuing series of biennial conferences EA–OHP organizes and devotes to OHP research and practice.

In 2000 the informal International Coordinating Group for Occupational Health Psychology (ICGOHP) was founded for the purpose of facilitating OHP-related research, education, and practice as well as coordinating international conference scheduling. Also in 2000, the journal Work & Stress became associated with the EA–OHP. The International Journal of Stress Management, although dedicated to life stress in all its forms, also publishes OHP-related papers. In 2005, the Society for Occupational Health Psychology (SOHP) was established in the United States. In 2008, SOHP joined with APA and NIOSH in co-sponsoring the Work, Stress, and Health Conferences. Also in 2008, EA–OHP and SOHP began to coordinate biennial conferences schedules such that the organizations' conferences would take place on alternate years, minimizing scheduling conflicts. In 2017, SOHP and Springer began to publish an OHP-related journal Occupational Health Science. The 2025 Work, Stress, and Health Conference is jointly sponsored by SOHP, the Oregon Healthy Workforce Center (a unit of the Oregon Health Sciences University), and EAPs Consulting.

== Research methods ==
The main aims of OHP research include understanding how working conditions affect worker health, applying that knowledge to the design of interventions to protect and improve worker health, and evaluating the effectiveness of such interventions. The research methods used in OHP are similar to those used in other branches of psychology.

=== Standard research designs ===
Self-report survey methodology is the most used approach in OHP research. Cross-sectional designs are commonly used; case-control designs have been employed much less frequently. Longitudinal designs including prospective cohort studies and experience sampling studies can examine relationships over time. OHP-related research devoted to evaluating health-promoting workplace interventions has relied on quasi-experiments, (less commonly) traditional randomized controlled trials and clustered randomized controlled trials, and (rarely) natural experiments.

=== Quantitative methods ===
Statistical methods commonly used in other areas of psychology are also used in OHP-related research. Statistical methods range from simple descriptive statistics to complex structural equation modeling and hierarchical linear modeling (HLM; also known as multilevel modeling). In research involving organizational units, HLM can better adjust for similarities among employee in the same units. HLM is also well suited to evaluating the lagged impact of work stressors on health outcomes in longitudinal OHP research because it can help minimize censoring; it can also be applied to experience-sampling studies. OHP researchers have conducted meta-analyses of results aggregated across multiple studies. Researchers studying the structural validity of their most commonly used OHP-related assessment instruments employ exploratory structural equation modeling bifactor analyses.

=== Qualitative research methods ===
Qualitative research methods used on OHP research include the following: interviews, focus groups, self-reported, written descriptions of stressful incidents at work. first-hand observation of workers on the job, and participant observation. Although there is no analogue to a meta-analysis for qualitative research, there are approaches to review articles that are imperfect analogues.

== Important theoretical models in OHP research ==
Three influential theoretical models in OHP research are the demand–control–support, effort–reward imbalance, and demand–resources models. Another but less contemporary model is the person–environment fit model.

=== Demand–control–support model ===
The most influential model in OHP research has been the original demand–control model. According to the model, the combination of low levels of work-related decision latitude (i.e., autonomy and control over the job) combined with high workloads (high levels of work demands) can be particularly harmful to workers because the combination can lead to "job strain", i.e., to poorer mental or physical health. The model suggests not only that these two job factors are related to poorer health but that high levels of decision latitude on the job will buffer or reduce the adverse health impact of high levels of demands. Research has clearly supported the idea that decision latitude and demands relate to strains, but research findings about buffering have been mixed with only some studies providing support. The demand-control model asserts that job control can come in two broad forms: skill discretion and decision authority. Skill discretion refers to the level of skill and creativity required on the job and the flexibility a worker is permitted in deciding what skills to use (e.g., opportunity to use skills, similar to job variety). Decision authority refers to workers being able to make decisions about their work (e.g., having autonomy). These two forms of job control are traditionally assessed together in a composite measure of decision latitude; there is, however, some evidence that the two types of job control may not be similarly related to health outcomes.

About a decade after Karasek first introduced the demand–control model, Johnson, Hall, and Theorell (1989), in the context of research on heart disease, extended the model to include social isolation. Johnson et al. labeled the combination of high levels of demands, low levels of control, and low levels of coworker support "iso-strain." The resulting expanded model has been labeled the demand–control–support (DCS) model. Research that followed the development of this model has suggested that one or more of the components of the DCS model (high psychological workload, low control, and lack of social support), if not the exact combination represented by iso-strain, have adverse effects of physical and mental health.

=== Effort–reward imbalance model ===
After the DCS model, the second most influential model in OHP research has been the effort–reward imbalance (ERI) model. It links job demands to the rewards employees receive for their work. That model holds that high work-related effort coupled with low control over extrinsic (e.g., pay) and job-related intrinsic (e.g., recognition) rewards triggers high levels of activation of neurohormonal pathways that, cumulatively, are thought to exert adverse effects on mental and physical health.

=== Job demands–resources model ===
An alternative model, the job demands–resources (JD–R) model, grew out of the DCS model. In the JD-R model, the category of demands (workload) remains more or less the same as in the DCS model although the JD-R model more specifically includes physical demands. Resources, however, are defined as job-relevant features that help workers achieve work-related goals, lessen job demands, or stimulate personal growth. Control and support as per the DCS model are subsumed under resources. Resources can be external (provided by the organization) or internal (part of a worker's personal make-up, for example self-confidence or quantitative skills). In addition to control and support, resources encompassed by the model can also include physical equipment, software, realistic performance feedback from supervisors, the worker's own coping strategies, etc. There has not, however, been as much research on the JD-R model as there has been on the constituents of the DC or DCS model.

=== Person–environment fit model ===
The person–environment (P–E) fit model is concerned with the extent to which a worker's abilities and personality dovetail with the tasks his/her job requires. The closeness of the person–job match influences the individual's health. One scholar observed that "an element of [the P–E fit research program] was loosely motivated by Darwinian theory, namely, the importance of the fit between the person and his or her environment" (p. 26). For the best possible outcomes, it is important that employees' skills, attitudes, abilities, and resources complement the demands of their job. The wider the gap or misfit—and this misfit can be either subjective or objective—between the worker and his/her work environment, the greater the risk of the worker experiencing mental and physical health problems. Misfit can also lead to lower productivity and other work problems. The P–E fit model was popular in the 1970s and the early 1980s. Since the late 1980s interest in the model has diminished largely because of problems representing P–E discrepancies mathematically and in statistical models linking P–E fit to strain.

== Research on psychosocial risk factors for poor health outcomes ==
=== Cardiovascular disease ===
Research has identified health-behavioral and biological factors that are related to increased risk for cardiovascular disease (CVD). These risk factors include smoking, obesity, low density lipoprotein (the "bad" cholesterol), lack of exercise, and blood pressure. Psychosocial working conditions are also risk factors for CVD. In a case-control study involving two large U.S. data sets, Murphy (1991) found that hazardous work situations, jobs that required vigilance and responsibility for others, and work that required attention to devices were related to increased risk for cardiovascular disability. These included jobs in transportation (e.g., air traffic controllers, airline pilots, bus drivers, locomotive engineers, truck drivers), preschool teachers, and craftsmen. Among 30 studies involving men and women, most have found an association between workplace stressors and CVD.

Fredikson, Sundin, and Frankenhaeuser (1985) found that reactions to psychological stressors include increased activity in the brain axes that play an important role in the regulation of blood pressure, particularly ambulatory blood pressure. A meta-analysis and systematic review involving 29 samples linked jobs that combine high workload and little autonomy/discretion/decision latitude (high-strain jobs) to elevated ambulatory blood pressure. Belkić et al. (2000) found that many of the 30 studies covered in their review revealed that decision latitude and psychological workload exerted independent effects on CVD; two studies found synergistic effects, consistent with the strictest version of the demand-control model. A review of 17 longitudinal studies having reasonably high internal validity found that 8 showed a significant relation between the combination of low levels of decision latitude and high workload and CVD and 3 more showed a nonsignificant relation. The findings, however, were clearer for men than for women, on whom data were more sparse. Fishta and Backé's review-of-reviews also links work-related psychosocial stress to elevated risk of CVD in men. In a massive (n > 197,000) longitudinal study that combined data from 13 independent studies, Kivimäki et al. (2012) found that, controlling for other risk factors, having a high-strain job at baseline increased the risk of CVD in initially healthy workers by between 20 and 30% over a follow-up period that averaged 7.5 years. In this study the effects were similar for men and women. Meta-analytic research also links high-strain jobs to stroke.

There is evidence that, consistent with the ERI model, high work-related effort coupled with low control over job-related rewards adversely affects cardiovascular health. At least five studies of men have linked effort–reward imbalance with CVD. Another large study links ERI to the incidence of coronary disease.

==== Job-related burnout, depression, and cardiovascular health ====
There is evidence from a prospective study that job-related burnout, controlling for traditional risk factors, such as smoking and hypertension, increases the risk of heart disease over the course of the next three and a half years in workers who were initially disease-free. Meta-analytic and other evidence, however, suggests that what is termed burnout is a depressive phenomenon. Meta-analytic and other evidence indicates that depression is a risk factor for cardiovascular disease and cardiovascular-related mortality.

==== Job loss and physical health ====
Research has suggested that job loss adversely affects cardiovascular health as well as health in general.

=== Musculoskeletal disorders ===
Musculoskeletal disorders (MSDs) involve injury and pain to the joints and muscles. Approximately 2.5 million workers in the US have MSDs, which is the third most common cause of disability and early retirement for American workers. In Europe MSDs are the most often reported workplace health problem. The development of musculoskelelatal problems cannot be solely explained in the basis of biomechanical factors (e.g., repetitive motion) although such factors are major contributors to MSD risk. Evidence has accumulated to show that psychosocial workplace factors (e.g., high-strain jobs) also contribute to the development of musculoskeletal problems. Systematic reviews and meta-analyses of high-quality longitudinal studies have indicated that psychosocial working conditions (e.g., supportive coworkers, monotonous work) are related to the development of MSDs.

=== Workplace mistreatment ===
There are many forms of workplace mistreatment ranging from relatively minor discourtesies to serious cases of bullying and violence.

==== Workplace incivility ====
Workplace incivility has been defined as "low-intensity deviant behavior with ambiguous intent to harm the target....Uncivil behaviors are characteristically rude and discourteous, displaying a lack of regard for others" (p. 457). Incivility is distinct from violence. Examples of workplace incivility include insulting comments, denigration of the target's work, spreading false rumors, social isolation, etc. A summary of research conducted in Europe suggests that workplace incivility is common there. In research on more than 1000 U.S. civil service workers, more than 70% of the sample experienced workplace incivility in the past five years. Compared to men, women were more exposed to incivility; incivility was associated with psychological distress and reduced job satisfaction.

==== Abusive supervision ====
Abusive supervision is the extent to which a supervisor engages in a pattern of behavior that harms subordinates.

==== Workplace bullying ====
Although definitions of workplace bullying vary, it involves a repeated pattern of harmful behaviors directed towards an individual by one or more others who, singly or collectively, have more power than the target. Workplace bullying is sometimes termed mobbing.

==== Sexual harassment ====
Sexual harassment is behavior that denigrates or mistreats an individual due to his or her gender, creates an offensive workplace, and interferes with an individual being able to perform his or her job.

==== Workplace violence ====
Workplace violence is a significant health hazard for employees, both physically and psychologically.

===== Nonfatal assault =====
Most workplace assaults are nonfatal, with an annual physical assault rate of 6% in the U.S. Assaultive behavior in the workplace often produces injury, psychological distress, and economic loss. One study of California workers found a rate of 72.9 non-fatal, officially documented assaults per 100,000 workers per year, with workers in the education, retail, and health care sectors subject to excess risk. A Minnesota workers' compensation study found that women workers had a twofold higher risk of being injured in an assault than men, and health and social service workers, transit workers, and members of the education sector were at high risk for injury compared to workers in other economic sectors. A West Virginia workers' compensation study found that workers in the health care sector and, to a lesser extent, the education sector were at elevated risk for assault-related injury. Another workers' compensation study found that excessively high rates of assault-related injury in schools, healthcare, and, to a lesser extent, banking. In addition to the physical injury that results from workplace violence, individuals who witness such violence without being directly victimized are at increased risk for experiencing adverse psychological effects, including high levels of distress and arousal, as found in a study of Los Angeles teachers.

===== Homicide =====
In 1996 there were 927 work-associated homicides in the United States, in a labor force that numbered approximately 132,616,000. The rate works out to be about 7 homicides per million workers for the one year. Men are more likely to be victims of workplace homicide than women.

=== Mental disorder ===
Research has found that psychosocial workplace factors are among the risk factors for a number of categories of mental disorder.

==== Increased consumption of alcohol ====
Workplace factors have been found to be related to increased alcohol consumption as well as alcohol use disorder and dependence of employees. Rates of excessive alcohol use can vary by occupation, with high rates in the construction and transportation industries as well as among waiters and waitresses. Within the transportation sector, heavy truck drivers and material movers were shown to be at especially high risk. A prospective study of ECA subjects who were followed one year after the initial interviews provided data on newly incident cases of alcohol use disorder. The study found that workers in jobs that combined low control with high physical demands were at increased risk of developing alcohol problems although the findings were confined to men.

==== Depression ====
Using data from the ECA study, Eaton, Anthony, Mandel, and Garrison (1990) found that members of three occupational groups, lawyers, secretaries, and special education teachers (but not other types of teachers) showed elevated rates of DSM-III major depression, adjusting for social demographic factors. The ECA study involved representative samples of American adults from five geographical areas, providing relatively unbiased estimates of the risk of mental disorder by occupation; however, because the data were cross-sectional, no conclusions bearing on cause-and-effect relations are warranted. Evidence from a Canadian prospective study indicated that individuals in the highest quartile of occupational stress (high-strain jobs as per the demand-control model) are at increased risk of experiencing an episode of major depression. A literature review and meta-analysis links high demands, low control, and low support to clinical depression. A meta-analysis that pooled the results of 11 well-designed longitudinal studies indicated that a number of facets of the psychosocial work environment (e.g., low decision latitude, high psychological workload, lack of social support at work, effort–reward imbalance, and job insecurity) increase the risk of common mental disorders such as depression.

==== Personality disorders ====
Depending on the diagnosis, severity and individual, and the job itself, personality disorders can be associated with difficulty coping with work or the workplace, potentially leading to problems with others by interfering with interpersonal relationships. Indirect effects also play a role; for example, impaired educational progress or complications outside of work, such as substance use disorders and co-morbid mental disorders, can affect patients. However, personality disorders can also bring about above-average work abilities by increasing competitive drive or causing them to exploit their co-workers.

==== Schizophrenia ====
In a case-control study, Link, Dohrenwend, and Skodol (1986) compared schizophrenic patients to two comparison groups, depressed individuals and well controls. Prior to their first episode of the disorder, the schizophrenic patients were more likely than the well controls and the depressed subjects to have had jobs characterized by "noisesome" work characteristics; noisesome work characteristics refer to noise, humidity, heat, cold, etc. The jobs tended to be of higher status than other blue collar jobs, suggesting that downward drift in already-affected individuals does not account for the finding. One explanation involving a diathesis–stress model suggests that the job-related stressors helped precipitate the first episode in already-vulnerable individuals. There is some supporting evidence from the Epidemiologic Catchment Area (ECA) study.

=== Psychological distress ===
Longitudinal studies have suggested adverse working conditions can contribute to increases in psychological distress. Psychological distress refers to negative affect, regardless of whether the individuals meet criteria for a psychiatric disorder. Psychological distress is often expressed in affective (depressive), psychophysical or psychosomatic (e.g., headaches, stomachaches, etc.), and anxiety symptoms. The relation of adverse working conditions to psychological distress is thus an important avenue of research. A literature review and meta-analysis of high-quality longitudinal studies link high demands, low control, and low support to distress symptoms.

Lower levels of job satisfaction are also related to increased distress and negative health outcomes.

==== Psychosocial working conditions ====
Parkes (1982) studied the relation of working conditions to psychological distress in British student nurses. She found that in her "natural experiment," student nurses experienced higher levels of distress and lower levels of job satisfaction in medical wards than in surgical wards; compared to surgical wards, medical wards make greater affective demands on the nurses. In another study, Frese (1985) concluded that objective working conditions (e.g., noise, ambiguities, conflicts) give rise to subjective stress and psychosomatic symptoms in blue collar German workers. In addition to the above studies, a number of other well-controlled longitudinal studies have implicated work stressors in the development of psychological distress and reduced job satisfaction.

==== Unemployment ====
A comprehensive meta-analysis involving 86 studies indicated that involuntary job loss is linked to increased psychological distress. The impact of involuntary unemployment was comparatively weaker in countries that had greater income equality and better social safety nets. The research evidence also indicates that poorer mental health slightly, but significantly, increases the risk of later job loss.

==== Economic insecurity ====
Some OHP research is concerned with (a) understanding the impact of economic crises on individuals' physical and mental health and well-being and (b) calling attention to personal and organizational means for ameliorating the impact of such a crisis. Economic insecurity contributes, at least partly, to psychological distress and work-family conflict. Ongoing job insecurity, even in the absence of job loss, is related to higher levels of depressive symptoms, psychological distress, and worse overall health.

==== Work–family balance ====
Employees must balance their working lives with their home lives. Work–family conflict is a situation in which the demands of work conflict with the demands of family or vice versa, making it difficult to adequately do both, giving rise to distress. Although more research has been conducted on work-family conflict, there is also the phenomenon of work-family enhancement, which occurs when positive effects carry over from one domain into the other.

=== Accidents and safety ===
Psychosocial factors can influence the risk of occupational accidents that can lead to employee injury or death. One prominent psychosocial factor is the organization's safety climate. Safety climate refers to employees' shared beliefs regarding the priority the organization assigns to safety relative to the organization's other goals.

== Research on workplace interventions to improve or protect worker health ==
A number of stress management interventions have emerged that have shown demonstrable effects in reducing job stress. Cognitive behavioral interventions have tended to have greatest impact on stress reduction.

=== Industrial organizations ===
OHP interventions often concern both the health of the individual and the health of the organization. Adkins (1999) described the development of one such intervention, an organizational health center (OHC) at a California industrial complex. The OHC helped to improve both organizational and individual health as well as help workers manage job stress. Innovations included labor-management partnerships, suicide risk reduction, conflict mediation, and occupational mental health support. OHC practitioners also coordinated their services with previously underutilized local community services in the same city, thus reducing redundancy in service delivery.

Hugentobler, Israel, and Schurman (1992) detailed a different, multi-layered intervention in a mid-sized Michigan manufacturing plant. The hub of the intervention was the Stress and Wellness Committee (SWC) which solicited ideas from workers on ways to improve both their well-being and productivity. Innovations the SWC developed included improvements that ensured two-way communication between workers and management and reduction in stress resulting from diminished conflict over issues of quantity versus quality. Both the interventions described by Adkins and Hugentobler et al. had a positive impact on productivity.

=== OHP research at the National Institute for Occupational Safety and Health ===
NIOSH has a research agenda aimed reducing the incidence of preventable work-related disorders and accidents. For example, NIOSH research has aimed at reducing the problem of sleep apnea among heavy-truck and tractor-trailer drivers and, concomitantly, the life-threatening accidents to which the disorders lead. Another goal of NIOSH has been to improve the health and safety of workers who are assigned to shift work or who work long hours. A third example of NIOSH's efforts is the goal of reducing the incidence of falls among iron workers.

=== Military and first responders ===
The Mental Health Advisory Teams of the United States Army employ OHP-related interventions with combat troops. OHP also has a role to play in interventions aimed at helping first responders.

=== Modestly scaled interventions ===
Schmitt (2007) described three different modestly scaled OHP-related interventions that helped workers abstain from smoking, exercise more frequently, and lose weight. Other OHP interventions included a campaign to improve the rates of hand washing, an effort to get workers to walk more often, and a drive to get employees to be more compliant with regard to taking prescribed medicines. The interventions tended reduce organization health-care costs.

=== Health promotion ===
Organizations can play a role in promoting healthy behaviors in employees by providing resources to encourage such behaviors. These behaviors can be in areas such as reduction of sedentary behaviour exercise, nutrition, and smoking cessation.

=== Prevention ===
Although the dimensions of the problem of workplace violence vary by economic sector, one sector, education, has had some limited success in introducing programmatic, psychologically based efforts to reduce the level of violence. Research suggests that there continue to be difficulties in successfully "screening out applicants [for jobs] who may be prone to engaging in aggressive behavior," suggesting that aggression-prevention training of existing employees may be an alternative to screening. Only a small number of studies evaluating the effectiveness of training programs to reduce workplace violence have been documented.

Kossek et al. (2019) conducted a large (n > 900) primary-prevention type of cluster-randomized controlled trial with intention-to-treat analyses, a research design that rarely combined those features in OHP research. The investigators evaluated the impact of an intervention designed to prevent psychological distress in nurses and nursing assistants working in long-term care facilities for the elderly. The experimental treatment largely involved providing workers in the experimental group more resources and greater control over their schedules. The intervention was designed to be cost-neutral for the organizations involved. The control treatment involved no organizational change; like the members of the experimental group, the members of the control group knew that they were part of a study supported by the National Institutes of Health. The intervention was particularly helpful in reducing distress in workers who had eldercare responsibilities outside of work.

While high-quality research on primary prevention type interventions such as the one conducted by Kossek et al. (2019) exists, the number of such intervention studies is small relative to research on tertiary-type interventions. Primary prevention in the work context refers to mitigating or eliminating workplace stressors to prevent high levels of psychological distress from developing in the first place. There exist a great many more tertiary prevention type interventions. Tertiary interventions (e.g., cognitive behavioral psychotherapy) involve helping individual who are already affected such as individuals who have developed high levels of depressive symptoms.

=== Total Worker Health ===
Because many companies have implemented worker safety and health measures in a fragmented way, a new approach to worker safety and health has emerged in response, driven by efforts advanced by NIOSH. NIOSH trademarked that approach, naming it Total Worker Health. Total Worker Health involves the coordination of evidence-based (a) health promotion practices at the level of the individual worker and (b) umbrella-like health and safety practices at the level of the organizational unit. Total Worker Health–type interventions integrate health protection and health promotion components. Health promotion components are more individually oriented, in other words, oriented toward the wellness and/or well-being of individual workers. An example of such a component is a smoking cessation program. Umbrella-like health and safety practices are ordinarily implemented at the level of the unit or the organization. An example of such a component is that of introducing, factory-wide, equipment to reduce worker exposures to aerosols. Total Worker Health-type interventions (i.e., interventions that integrate individual employee health promotion components and organizational-level occupational safety/heath components) can prevent work-related disorder and reduce injury.

== See also ==
- Centre for Occupational and Health Psychology
- Decent work
- Employee assistance programs
- European Academy of Occupational Health Psychology
- Happiness at work
- Human factors and ergonomics
- Industrial and organizational psychology
- International Journal of Stress Management
- Journal of Occupational Health Psychology
- Kiss up kick down
- Labor rights
- Machiavellianism in the workplace
- Mobbing
- Narcissism in the workplace
- Occupational Health Science (journal)
- Occupational safety and health
- Occupational stress
- Personnel psychology
- Psychopathy in the workplace
- Social undermining
- Society for Occupational Health Psychology
- Stress management
- Total Worker Health
- Work & Stress
- Workers' right to access the toilet
- Workplace wellness
