= Conservation of resources theory =

Psychological theory

Conservation of Resources (COR) Theory is a stress theory that describes the motivation driving humans to both maintain their current resources and to pursue new resources. This theory was proposed by Dr. Stevan E. Hobfoll in 1989 as a way to expand on the literature on stress as a construct.

Hobfoll posited that psychological stress occurred in three instances: when there was a threat of a loss of resources, an actual net loss of resources, and a lack of gained resources following the spending of resources or providing significant effort. From this perspective, resources are defined as things that one values, specifically objects, states, and conditions. COR states that loss of these types of resources will drive individuals into certain levels of stress.

== History of stress theory ==
COR was developed from various theories on the cause of stress. COR development branches back to Walter Bradford Cannon (1932) who was one of the first researchers to study the concept of stress as it applies to humans, specifically in how stress can be withstood. Hans Selye (1950) took on Cannon's research on stress as a response and indicated that stress itself was designed as a way to protect the body from environmental challenges.

Other researchers, such as Elliot and Eisdorfer (1982) defined stress as specifically being the stimulus and not the response, which had been accepted by some of the scientific community. However, this theory is largely based on the homeostatic model of stress developed by Joseph McGrath (1970). It is in this theory that stress is defined as an imbalance between the environmental demand and the response capability of an organism.

== Basic principles of COR ==
COR covers two basic principles involving the protection of resources from being lost. The first principle is called the Primacy of Resource Loss. This principle states that it is more harmful for individuals to lose resources compared to when there is a gain of resources. What this means is that a loss of pay will be more harmful than the same gain in pay would have been helpful.

The second principle is known as Resource Investment. This principle of COR states that people will tend to invest resources to protect against resource loss, to recover from losses, and to gain resources. Within the context of coping, people will invest resources to prevent future resource losses. Resources can include "health, well-being, family, self-esteem, and a sense of purpose or meaning in life" as stated in the Annual Review of Organizational Psychology and Organizational Behaviour in 2018.

From these two principles, COR has suggested a number of corollaries that can be applied to resource changes. They are as follows:

1. Individuals with higher resources will be set up for gains in resources. Similarly, individuals with fewer resources are more likely to experience resource losses.
2. Initial resource loss will lead to resource loss in the future.
3. Initial resource gains will lead to resource gains in the future.
4. A lack of resources will invariably lead to defensive attempts to conserve the remaining resources.

== Areas of research ==
COR has been utilized when studying work/family stress, burnout, and general stress. In work/family stress, COR research has looked at how the distribution of one's resources have affected their home life, with some articles finding that putting too much of one's resources into one's work may lead to family problems at home. Research into COR and burnout has examined how the use of resources has impacted one's mood, with recent research finding that emotional exhaustion had the strongest relationship with depressive symptoms.

In regards to general stress, research has explored how the loss of resources impacts the levels of one's stress. COR has primarily been studied within the burnout and job fields, as the following meta-analyses will demonstrate. There is currently no meta-analyses on COR within other areas of stress research.

Multiple meta-analyses have been conducted with COR, specifically related to burnout. One meta-analysis by Lee and Ashforth (1996) examined the relationship between demand and resource correlates, behavioral and attitudinal correlate, and 3 different dimensions of job burnout. It used COR as the basis for this research and found that the primacy of resource loss principle is supported. It found that, over 58 sources, individuals tend to be sensitive to increased demands rather than resources received.

Job control and COR have been studied through a meta-analyses conducted by Park, Baiden, Jacob, & Wagner (2009). This study tested COR using all constructs involved in job control and burnout which included constructs of autonomy, authority, skill discretion, and decision latitude. Results indicate that the construct of job control, or the ability that one has to choose their actions from multiple options at their job, is related to depersonalization and personal accomplishment. This study stated that COR is related to burnout in this way, but further studies should be conducted that use non-human service occupations.
