= International Commission on Occupational Health =

The International Commission on Occupational Health (ICOH) is an international non-governmental professional society, founded in Milan during the Expo 1906 as the Permanent Commission on Occupational Health.

ICOH aims at fostering the scientific progress, knowledge and development of occupational health and safety in all its aspects. Today, ICOH is the world's leading international scientific society in the field of occupational health with a membership of 2,000 professionals from over 100 countries and is recognised by the United Nations as a non-governmental organisation (NGO) with close working relationships with ILO, WHO, UNEP and ISSA.

== Activities ==
The most visible activities of ICOH are the triennial World Congresses on Occupational Health, which are usually attended by some 3,000 participants. The 2000 Congress was held in Singapore, the 2003 Congress in Iguassu Falls (Brazil), the 2006 Centennial Congress in Milan, (Italy), the 2009 Congress in Cape Town (South Africa), ICOH 2012 Congress in Cancun (Mexico), ICOH 2015 Congress in Seoul (Rep. of Korea), while ICOH 2018 was held in Dublin (Ireland). The next ICOH Congress will be held in 2022 in a digital format. ICOH 2024 will be held in Marrakesh (Morocco) and ICOH 2027 in Mumbai (India).

At the ICOH 2006 General Assembly, the President highlighted the overriding importance of permanent training and education of experts in order to face the rapidly changing world of work, the need to develop occupational health services throughout the world (including the development and dissemination of Basic Occupational Health Services – BOHS), the importance of creating BOHS guidelines, tools, training, and pilot projects and the intention of making a global survey on the OHS situation in ICOH member countries. Cooperation with World Health Organization, International Labour Organization and other NGO partners is among the priorities of the current ICOH Strategy (ICOH Centennial Declaration).

== Presidents and Secretaries General ==
Presidents: M. De Cristoforis 1906 – 1915, L. Devoto 1915 – 1936, D. Glibert 1936 – 1940, T. Stowell 1948 – 1951, P. Mazell 1951 – 1954, S. Forssman 1954 – 1969, L. Noro 1969 – 1975, E. Vigliani 1975 – 1981, R. Murray 1981 – 1987, S. Hernberg 1987 – 1993, J. F. Caillard 1993 – 2000, B. Knave 2000 – 2003, J. Rantanen 2003 – 2009, K. Kogi 2009 – 2015, J. Takala 2015 – 2022, S.K. Kang 2022–present.

Secretaries General: L. Carozzi 1906 – 1957, E. Vigliani 1957 – 1975, R. Murray 1975 – 1981, L. Parmeggiani 1981 – 1988, J. Jeyaratnam 1989 – 2000, K. S. Chia 2000 – 2003, S. Iavicoli 2003 – 2022, D. Gagliardi 2022–present.

== Current Officers and Board Members ==
=== Officers ===
- President – Seong-Kyu Kang (Rep of Korea)
- Vice President – Claudina Nogueira (South Africa)
- Vice President – Martin Hogan (Ireland)
- Secretary General – Diana Gagliardi (Italy)
- Past President – Jukka Takala (Finland)
- Past Secretary General – Sergio Iavicoli (Italy)

=== Board Members ===
- Alexis Descatha (France),
- Maureen Dollard (Australia),
- Frida Marina Fischer (Brazil),
- Sunil Kumar Joshi (Nepal),
- Eun-A Kim (Rep. of Korea),
- Kirsi Lappalainen (Finland),
- Stavroula Leka (Ireland),
- Olivier Lo (Singapore),
- Dingani Moyo (Zimbabwe),
- Shyam Pingle (India),
- Riitta Sauni (Finland),
- Paul A. Schulte (US),
- Sandeep Sharma (India),
- Akizumi Tsutsumi (Japan),
- Francesco S. Violante (Italy).

== Scientific Committees ==
ICOH has 38 Scientific Committees. They cover a broad scope of challenges and problems in work life, including traditional risks of occupational injuries and diseases, and the risks of "new work life". The Scientific Committees focus specifically on the areas of competence and promote and carry out research in their respective fields. Most of these committees have regular symposia, scientific monographs and review the abstracts submitted to the International Congresses.

1. Accident Prevention
2. Aging and Work
3. Allergy and Immunotoxicology
4. Biohazards and Occupational Health
5. Cardiology in OH
6. Education and Training in OH
7. Emergency Preparedness and Response in OH
8. Epidemiology in OH
9. Effectiveness in OH Services
10. History of Prevention of Occupational and Environmental Diseases
11. Indoor Air Quality and Health
12. Industrial Hygiene
13. Mining Occupational Safety and Health
14. Musculoskeletal Disorders
15. Nanomaterial Workers Health
16. Neurotoxicology and Psychophysiology
17. Occupational and Environmental Dermatoses
18. Occupational Health Nursing
19. Occupational Medicine
20. Occupational Toxicology
21. OH and Development
22. OH for Health Workers
23. OH in the Chemical Industry
24. OH in the Construction Industry
25. Radiation and Work
26. Reproductive Hazards in the Workplace
27. Respiratory Disorders
28. Rural Health: Agriculture, Pesticides and Organic Dusts
29. Shiftwork and Working Time
30. Small-Scale Enterprises and the Informal Sector
31. Thermal Factors
32. Toxicology of Metals
33. Unemployment, Job Insecurity and Health
34. Vibration and Noise
35. Women Health and Work
36. Work and Vision
37. Work Disability Prevention and Integration
38. Work Organization and Psychosocial Factors

== Asbestos ban ==
ICOH relations with International Organizations (WHO, ILO) have received critiques, notably on the issue of asbestos: "Part of the explanation for this bland acceptance of the asbestos cancer epidemic is that the WHO and the ILO have allowed organizations such as the International Commission on occupational Health (ICOH) and other asbestos industry consultants and experts to manipulate them and to distort the scientific evidence. The WHO and the ILO were lulled into inaction by conflicting scientific reports of the epidemic."

ICOH has set among its main priorities the Asbestos Ban, taking a position in favour of the global ban of asbestos. Through its official bodies and individual members ICOH took actions at all levels of activity, global, national and workplace levels:

1. After the Call for an International ban for asbestos produced by the Collegium Ramazzini, the ICOH Officers Meeting in Paris, 30–31 August 1999, chaired by the ICOH President at that time, Professor Jean-Francois Caillard, decided to endorse it. Furthermore, the endorsement of the "Call for an International ban for asbestos" was approved by the ICOH 2nd General Assembly on 1 September 2000, in connection with the ICOH 2000 Congress.
2. The need for a continuous follow-up was recognised during ICOH 2000–2002 triennium and the ICOH President, Prof. Bengt Knave, decided to establish a Task Group on Asbestos (including members of the Board), that presented in the ICOH Board Meeting of 1–2 March 2002, an article by Benedetto Terracini "World Asbestos Congress: Past, Present and Future, Osasco (Brazil) 17–20 September 2000", as a report. The article was endorsed by the Board.
3. The European Conference on Asbestos 2003 on 3–6 September 2003, drafted and adopted the "Dresden Declaration on Protection of Workers against Asbestos". The Declaration was drafted with strong input by ICOH President and the Secretary of the Scientific Committee on Industrial Hygiene and it summarizes the contemporary effort of ICOH which has the scientific role to "provide guidance and support for a well-governed process to eliminate the use of asbestos". For this aim, ICOH Past President, Jorma Rantanen, during the 13th Session of the Joint ILO/WHO Committee on Occupational Health made the proposal for elimination of asbestos related diseases as a priority for ILO/WHO collaboration. The Committee unanimously approved the proposal.
4. ICOH commitment in this field was also attested by the full support to the Asian Asbestos Conference 2006 organized in Thailand on 26–27 July 2006 by the Ministry of Public Health and co-sponsored by the International Labour Office (ILO), the World Health Organization (WHO), International Ban Asbestos Secretariat (IBAS) and the International Commission on Occupational Health (ICOH). During the Conference, Jorma Rantanen declared ICOH's unequivocal support for a global asbestos ban; this position is rooted in the experiences of ICOH members who have observed the dire consequences of hazardous asbestos exposures on their patients in industrialized countries. Rantanen urged that concerted action be taken by international agencies, national governments, trade unions and NGOs to raise awareness of the asbestos hazard and to highlight the long-term economic benefits of transferring to non-asbestos technologies.
5. The "Bangkok Declaration", recalling the ILO resolution on Asbestos, the ILO Conventions on Occupational Cancer (No. 139), the Safety in the Use of Asbestos, the WHO Global Strategy on Occupational Health for All and the WHA Resolution 58.22 on Cancer Prevention and Control and considering the ICOH International Code of Ethics for Occupational Health Professionals, declared the support of its signatories for a global asbestos ban and was widely disseminated through many networks.
6. For the triennium 2009–2012, a new ICOH Working Group on the Elimination of Asbestos-related Diseases was set. The Working Group mainly focused on examining the existing regulations and bans in order to develop specific recommendation for actions and guidelines.
7. ICOH continued its efforts on this specific issue through the ICOH Statement: Global Asbestos Ban and the Elimination of Asbestos-Related Diseases. To accomplish such elimination, ICOH urges each and every individual country to implement a total ban on production and use of asbestos. ICOH also urges complementary efforts aimed at primary, secondary and tertiary prevention of asbestos-related diseases through country-specific "National Programmes for Elimination of Asbestos-Related Diseases" in line with ILO and WHO guidelines.

At the national level the expert input of ICOH members to the decisions concerning the ban of asbestos can be found for example in Finland, Sweden, Germany, Japan and Norway. The ICOH members also were most instrumental in production of the "Asbestos, asbestosis, and cancer: the Helsinki criteria for diagnosis and attribution" – a document that has been taken in use in everyday practices in diagnosing, recognition and compensation of asbestos related diseases and has also been used in courts in some countries in defence of victims of the diseased persons. ICOH members also train the experts in occupational medicine and safety by using the research and criteria documents as a support for education.

== Core documents ==
- ICOH Constitution
- ICOH Bye-Laws
- ICOH Code of Ethics
- ICOH Good Association Practice

== See also ==
- Occupational health psychology
- Occupational medicine
- Occupational safety and health
- Total Worker Health
