= Society for Occupational Health Psychology =

American occupational health psychology organization

The Society for Occupational Health Psychology (SOHP) is the first organization in the United States to be devoted to occupational health psychology. It is dedicated to the application of scientific knowledge for the purpose of improving worker health and well-being.

SOHP, together with the American Psychological Association (APA) and the National Institute for Occupational Safety and Health (NIOSH), biennially organizes an international conference dedicated to research and practice in occupational health psychology (OHP). The American Psychological Association sponsors an online listserv, with many contributors from SOHP, to promote discussion and information sharing regarding OHP.

== History ==
SOHP is the first organization in the United States to be devoted to OHP. The development of this discipline within psychology and the origins of the society are closely linked. About half the organization's members come from industrial and organizational psychology, with many others coming from health psychology and related disciplines (e.g., occupational medicine, nursing).

APA and NIOSH jointly organized an International Conference on Work, Stress, and Health in Washington, DC in 1990. At the conference, the individuals who would form the core of SOHP began to get to know each other. Beginning with the conference in 1990, APA and NIOSH arranged a series of Work, Stress, and Health conferences in two- to three-year cycles (now two-year cycles).

In 1996, with the help of some of the conference organizers, APA began publication of the Journal of Occupational Health Psychology. Also in 1996, the International Commission on Occupational Health added to its portfolio of committees devoted to worker health the Work Organisation and Psychosocial Factors committee, a unit dedicated to developing and disseminating OHP-related healthful workplace practices. The European Academy of Occupational Health Psychology (EA-OHP) was established in 1999. In the U.S., researchers arrived at the idea that the best way to train the next generation would be to create graduate programs in OHP. Beginning in the mid-1990s, APA and NIOSH began to furnish seed grants to stimulate graduate training in OHP. By 2001, there were OHP graduate programs at 11 U.S. universities. Through the 1990s and the early 2000s, momentum was, thus, building in terms of creating institutions related to OHP.

Many of the individuals who participated in the APA/NIOSH conferences also attended the first organizational meeting devoted to the creation of an OHP-related society in the U.S. The meeting was held at the University of South Florida. A follow-up meeting was held at Portland State University that led to the founding of the society. In 2005, at a meeting held at the offices of APA, SOHP was formally founded, with Leslie Hammer of Portland State University as president. In 2006, the society began to play a role, although a small one, in organizing the Work, Stress, and Health conference held that year. Two years later, SOHP became a full partner with APA and NIOSH in organizing the Work, Stress, and Health conferences.

In 2006, SOHP, like other learned societies, arranged to publish a newsletter to cover news relevant to the membership. The first edition was published in 2007. In 2008, the society began to coordinate activities, including conference scheduling, with its European counterpart, EA-OHP. In 2017, SOHP began publishing its own journal, Occupational Health Science.

== Occupational Health Science ==
Occupational Health Science
- Discipline: Occupational health psychology, occupational health
- Language: English
- Edited by: Robert R. Sinclair

Publication details
- History: 2017–present
- Publisher: Springer Science+Business Media
- Frequency: Quarterly
- Open access: Hybrid
- Impact factor: 3.1 (2022)

Standard abbreviations
- ISO 4: Occup. Health Sci.

Indexing
- ISSN: 2367-0134 (print); 2367-0142 (web)
- LCCN: 2020204000
- OCLC no.: 1012494848

Links
- Journal homepage; Online archive

Occupational Health Science is a quarterly peer-reviewed medical and psychological journal. It is sponsored by the Society for Occupational Health Psychology and published by Springer Science+Business Media. The founding editor-in-chief is Robert R. Sinclair (Clemson University). The journal was established in 2017, and publishes empirical and theoretical articles on psychological and behavioral components of occupational health, including physical health, psychological well-being, and worker safety. It is abstracted and indexed in the Emerging Sources Citation Index and PsycInfo. According to the Journal Citation Reports, the journal has a 2022 impact factor of 3.1.

== See also ==
- Centre for Occupational and Health Psychology
- European Academy of Occupational Health Psychology
- Health psychology
- Industrial and organizational psychology
- International Commission on Occupational Health
- International Journal of Stress Management
- Journal of Occupational Health Psychology
- Work & Stress
