= Psychological stress =

Feeling of strain and pressure

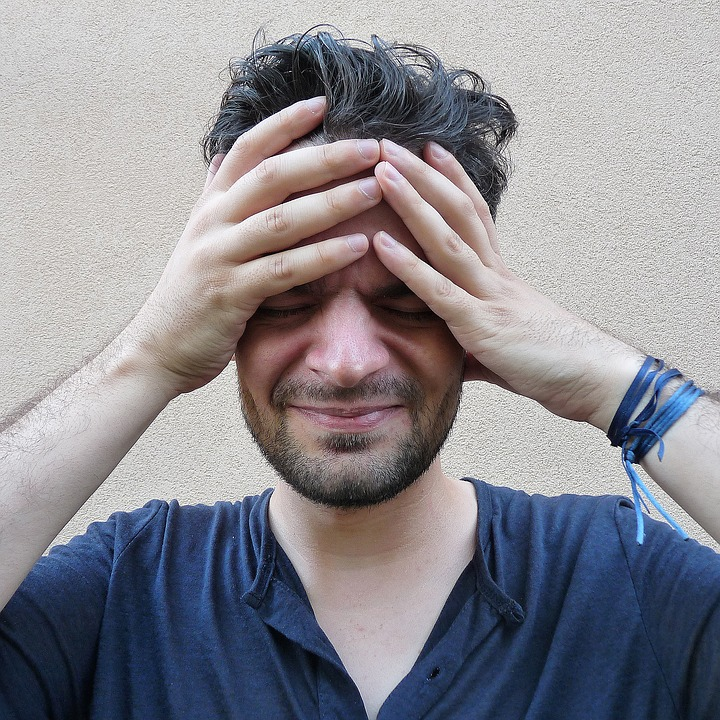
- A man expressing stress
- Specialty: Psychology, occupational medicine
- Symptoms: Anxiety, worry, paranoia, anger, burnout, compassion fatigue, sleep disturbances, hypervigilance, impatience, derealization, dissociation, changes in volition

In psychology, stress is a feeling of emotional strain and pressure. Stress is a form of psychological and mental discomfort. Small amounts of stress may be beneficial, as it can improve athletic performance, motivation and reaction to the environment. Excessive amounts of stress, however, can increase the risk of strokes, heart attacks, ulcers, and mental illnesses such as depression and also aggravate pre-existing conditions.

Psychological stress can be external and related to the environment, but may also be caused by internal perceptions that cause an individual to experience anxiety or other negative emotions surrounding a situation, such as pressure, discomfort, etc., which they then deem stressful.

Hans Selye (1974) proposed four variations of stress. On one axis, he locates good stress (eustress) and bad stress (distress). On the other is over-stress (hyperstress) and understress (hypostress). Selye advocates balancing these: the ultimate goal would be to balance hyperstress and hypostress perfectly and have as much eustress as possible.

The term "eustress" comes from the Greek root eu- which means "good" (as in "euphoria"). Eustress results when a person perceives a stressor as positive. "Distress" stems from the Latin root dis- (as in "dissonance" or "disagreement"). Medically defined distress is a threat to the quality of life. It occurs when a demand vastly exceeds a person's capabilities.

== Causes ==
=== Neutrality of stressors ===
Stress is a non-specific response. It is neutral, and what varies is the degree of response. It is all about the context of the individual and how they perceive the situation. Hans Selye defined stress as "the nonspecific (that is, common) result of any demand upon the body, be the effect mental or somatic." This includes the medical definition of stress as a physical demand and the colloquial definition of stress as a psychological demand. A stressor is inherently neutral meaning that the same stressor can cause either distress or eustress. It is individual differences and responses that induce either distress or eustress.

=== Types of stressors ===
A stressor is any event, experience, or environmental stimulus that causes stress in an individual. These events or experiences are perceived as threats or challenges to the individual and can be either physical or psychological. Researchers have found that stressors can make individuals more prone to both physical and psychological problems, including heart disease and anxiety.

Stressors are more likely to affect the health of an individual when they are "chronic, highly disruptive, or perceived as uncontrollable". In psychology, researchers generally classify the different types of stressors into four categories: 1) crises/catastrophes, 2) major life events, 3) daily hassles/microstressors, and 4) ambient stressors. According to Ursin (1988), the common factor between these categories is an inconsistency between expected events ("set value") and perceived events ("actual value") that cannot be resolved satisfactorily, which puts stress into the broader context of cognitive-consistency theory. For scientific research, several laboratory and clinical stress tests with well-defined stressors have been developed.

==== Crises/catastrophes ====
This type of stressor is unforeseen and unpredictable and, as such, is completely out of the control of the individual. Examples of crises and catastrophes include: devastating natural disasters, such as major floods or earthquakes, wars, pandemics, etc. Though rare in occurrence, this type of stressor typically causes a great deal of stress in a person's life. A study conducted by Stanford University found that after natural disasters, those affected experienced a significant increase in stress level. Combat stress is a widespread acute and chronic problem. With the rapid pace and the urgency of firing first, accidental killings of friendly forces (or fratricide) may occur. Prevention requires stress reduction, emphasis on vehicle and other identification training, awareness of the tactical situation, and continual risk analysis by leaders at all levels.

==== Major life events ====
Common examples of major life events include: marriage, going to college, death of a loved one, birth of a child, divorce, moving houses, etc. These events, either positive or negative, can create a sense of uncertainty and fear, which will ultimately lead to stress. For instance, research has found the elevation of stress during the transition from high school to university, with college freshmen being about two times more likely to be stressed than final year students. Research has found that major life events are somewhat less likely to be major causes of stress, due to their rare occurrences.

The length of time since occurrence and whether or not it is a positive or negative event are factors in whether or not it causes stress and how much stress it causes. Researchers have found that events that have occurred within the past month generally are not linked to stress or illness, while chronic events that occurred more than several months ago are linked to stress and illness and personality change. Additionally, positive life events are typically not linked to stress – and if so, generally only trivial stress – while negative life events can be linked to stress and the health problems that accompany it. However, positive experiences and positive life changes can predict decreases in neuroticism.

==== Daily hassles/microstressors ====
This category includes daily annoyances and minor hassles. Examples include: making decisions, meeting deadlines at work or school, traffic jams, encounters with irritating personalities, etc. Often, this type of stressor includes conflicts with other people. Daily stressors, however, are different for each individual, as not everyone perceives a certain event as stressful. For example, most people find public speaking to be stressful, but someone who has experience with it will not.

Daily hassles are the most frequently occurring type of stressor in most adults. The high frequency of hassles causes this stressor to have the most physiological effect on an individual. Carolyn Aldwin, Ph.D., conducted a longitudinal study on older men (mean age ca. 66 years at the time of first stress assessment) at the Oregon State University that examined the perceived intensity of daily hassles on an individual's mortality. Aldwin's study concluded that there is a strong correlation between individuals who rate their hassles as very intense and a high level of mortality. One's perception of their daily stressors can have a modulating effect on the physiological impact of daily stressors.

There are three major psychological types of conflicts that can cause stress.

- The approach-approach conflict, occurs when a person is choosing between two equally attractive options, i.e. whether to go see a movie or to go see a concert.
- The avoidance-avoidance conflict, occurs where a person has to choose between two equally unattractive options, for example, to take out a second loan with unappealing terms to pay off the mortgage or to face foreclosure on one's house.
- The approach-avoidance conflict, occurs when a person is forced to choose whether or not to partake in something that has both attractive and unattractive traits – such as whether or not to attend an expensive college (meaning taking out loans now, but also meaning a quality education and employment after graduation).

Travel-related stress results from three main categories: lost time, surprises (an unforeseen event such as lost or delayed baggage) and routine breakers (inability to maintain daily habits).

==== Ambient stressors ====
As the name implies, these are global (as opposed to individual) low-grade stressors that are a part of the background environment. They are defined as stressors that are "chronic, negatively valued, non-urgent, physically perceptible, and intractable to the efforts of individuals to change them". Typical examples of ambient stressors are pollution, noise, crowding, and traffic. Unlike the other three types of stressor, ambient stressors can (but do not necessarily have to) negatively impact stress without conscious awareness.

==== Organisational stressors ====
Studies conducted in military and combat fields show that some of the most potent stressors can be due to personal organisational problems in the unit or on the home front. Stress due to bad organisational practices is often connected to "toxic leadership", both in companies and in governmental organisations.

=== Stressor impact ===
Life events scales can be used to assess stressful things that people experience in their lives. One such scale is the Holmes and Rahe Stress Scale, also known as the Social Readjustment Rating Scale, or SRRS. Developed by psychiatrists Thomas Holmes and Richard Rahe in 1967, the scale lists 43 stressful events.

To calculate one's score, add up the number of "life change units" if an event occurred in the past year. A score of more than 300 means that individual is at risk for illness, a score between 150 and 299 means risk of illness is moderate, and a score under 150 means that individual only has a slight risk of illness.

| Life Event | Life Change Units |
|---|---|
| Death of a spouse | 100 |
| Divorce | 73 |
| Marital separation | 65 |
| Imprisonment | 63 |
| Death of a close family member | 63 |
| Personal injury or illness | 53 |
| Marriage | 50 |
| Dismissal from work | 47 |
| Marital reconciliation | 45 |
| Retirement | 45 |
| Change in health of family member | 44 |
| Pregnancy | 40 |
| Sexual difficulties | 39 |
| Gain a new family member | 39 |
| Business readjustment | 39 |
| Change in financial state | 38 |
| Death of a close friend | 37 |
| Change to different line of work | 36 |
| Change in frequency of arguments | 35 |
| Major mortgage | 32 |
| Foreclosure of mortgage or loan | 30 |
| Change in responsibilities at work | 29 |
| Child leaving home | 29 |
| Trouble with in-laws | 29 |
| Outstanding personal achievement | 28 |
| Spouse starts or stops work | 26 |
| Begin or end school | 26 |
| Change in living conditions | 25 |
| Revision of personal habits | 24 |
| Trouble with boss | 23 |
| Change in working hours or conditions | 20 |
| Change in residence | 20 |
| Change in schools | 20 |
| Change in recreation | 19 |
| Change in church activities | 19 |
| Change in social activities | 18 |
| Minor mortgage or loan | 17 |
| Change in sleeping habits | 16 |
| Change in number of family reunions | 15 |
| Change in eating habits | 14 |
| Vacation | 13 |
| Minor violation of law | 10 |

A modified version was made for non-adults. The scale is below.

| Life Event | Life Change Units |
|---|---|
| Unwed pregnancy | 100 |
| Death of parent | 100 |
| Getting married | 95 |
| Divorce of parents | 90 |
| Acquiring a visible deformity | 80 |
| Fathering an unwed pregnancy | 70 |
| Jail sentence of parent for over one year | 70 |
| Marital separation of parents | 69 |
| Death of a sibling | 68 |
| Change in acceptance by peers | 67 |
| Pregnancy of unprepared for sibling | 64 |
| Discovery of being an adopted child | 63 |
| Marriage of parent to stepparent | 63 |
| Death of a close friend | 63 |
| Having a visible congenital deformity | 62 |
| Serious illness requiring hospitalization | 58 |
| Failure of a grade in school | 56 |
| Not making an extracurricular activity | 55 |
| Hospitalization of a parent | 55 |
| Jail sentence of parent for over 30 days | 53 |
| Breaking up with partner | 53 |
| Beginning to date | 51 |
| Suspension from school | 50 |
| Becoming involved with drugs or alcohol | 50 |
| Birth of a sibling | 50 |
| Increase in arguments between parents | 47 |
| Loss of job by parent | 46 |
| Outstanding personal achievement | 46 |
| Change in parent's financial status | 45 |
| Accepted at college of choice | 43 |
| Being a senior in high school | 42 |
| Hospitalization of a sibling | 41 |
| Increased absence of parent from home | 38 |
| Sibling leaving home | 37 |
| Addition of third adult to family | 34 |
| Becoming a full-fledged member of a church | 31 |
| Decrease in arguments between parents | 27 |
| Decrease in arguments with parents | 26 |
| Parent beginning work | 26 |

The SRRS is used in psychiatry to weight the impact of life events.

== Measurement ==
There are multiple approaches to the assessment of psychological stress, including questionnaires, biosignal measurements, and bioanalytical sample assays. While questionnaires depend on people answering the items in a way that can be influenced, biosignal measurements and bioanalytical sample assays focus on autonomic physiological processes that usually cannot be consciously influenced. Modern people may attempt to self-assess their own "stress-level"; third parties (sometimes clinicians) may also provide qualitative evaluations. Quantitative approaches such as Galvanic Skin Response or other measurements giving results which may correlate with perceived psychological stress include testing for one or more of the several stress hormones, for cardiovascular responses, or for immune response. There are some valid questionnaires to assess stress level such as, Higher Education Stress Inventory (HESI) is a valid questionnaire used in many communities for assessment the stress level of college students. There are many (psycho-)physiological measurement methods that correlate more or less well with psychological stress (mental or emotional) and are thus used as a possible indicator.

In the physiological domain of oculomotor function alone, several physiological responses are suspected to detect different stress situations in a person-specific and objective manner (not by means of a survey). For example, via eye movement and gaze behavior, via pupil behavior and via eyelid blink behavior (Blinking).

== Physical effects ==
To measure the body's response to stress, psychologists tend to use Hans Selye's general adaptation syndrome. This biological model, often referred to as the "classic stress response", revolves around the concept of homeostasis. General adaptive syndrome, according to this system, occurs in three stages:

1. The alarm reaction. This stage occurs when the stressor is first presented. The body begins to gather resources to deal with the stressor. The hypothalamic-pituitary-adrenal axis and sympathetic nervous system are activated, resulting in the release of hormones from the adrenal gland such as cortisol, adrenaline (epinephrine), and norepinephrine into the bloodstream to adjust bodily processes. These hormonal adjustments increase energy-levels, increase muscle tension, reduce sensitivity to pain, slow down the digestive system, and cause a rise in blood pressure. In addition, the locus coeruleus, a collection of norepinephrine-containing neurons in the pons of the brainstem whose axons project to various regions of the brain, is involved in releasing norepinephrine directly onto neurons. High levels of norepinephrine acting as a neurotransmitter on its receptors expressed on neurons in brain regions, such as the prefrontal cortex, are thought to be involved in the effects of stress on executive functions, such as impaired working memory.
2. The stage of resistance. The body continues building up resistance throughout the stage of resistance, either until the body's resources are depleted, leading to the exhaustion phase, or until the stressful stimulus is removed. As the body uses up more and more of its resources, it becomes increasingly tired and susceptible to illness. At this stage psychosomatic disorders first begin to appear.
3. The stage of exhaustion. The body is completely drained of the hormones and resources it was depending on to manage the stressor. The person now begins to exhibit behaviors such as anxiety, irritability, avoidance of responsibilities and relationships, self-destructive behavior, and poor judgment. Someone experiencing these symptoms has a much greater chance of lashing out, damaging relationships, or avoiding social interaction at all.

This physiological stress response involves high levels of sympathetic nervous system activation, often referred to as the "fight or flight" response. The response involves pupil dilation, release of endorphins, increased heart and respiration rates, cessation of digestive processes, secretion of adrenaline, arteriole dilation, and constriction of veins.

=== Cancer ===
Psychological stress does not appear to be a risk factor for the onset of cancer, though it may worsen outcomes in those who already have cancer. Research has found that personal belief in stress as a risk factor for cancer was common in England, though awareness of risk factors overall was found to be low.

=== Other effects ===
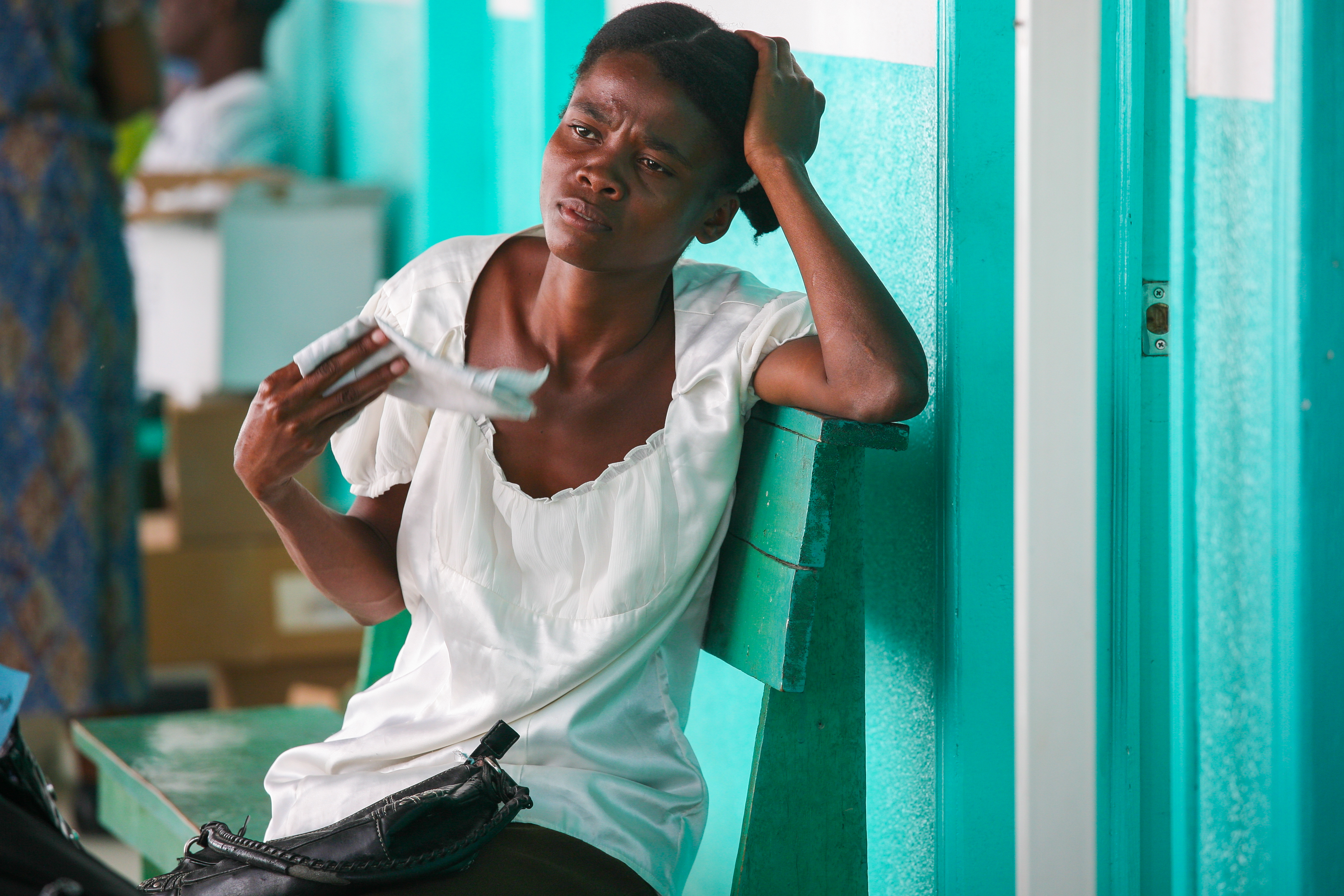
A stressed woman waiting in line at a medical centre

There is likely a connection between stress and illness. Theories of a proposed stress–illness link suggest that both acute and chronic stress can cause illness, and studies have found such a link. According to these theories, both kinds of stress can lead to changes in behavior and in physiology. Behavioral changes can involve smoking and eating habits and physical activity. Physiological changes can be changes in sympathetic activation or hypothalamic pituitary adrenocorticoid activation, and immunological function. However, there is much variability in the link between stress and illness.

There is some evidence that stress can make the individual more susceptible to physical illnesses like the common cold. "Although chronic (but not acute) stressful events are associated with greater susceptibility, the association between social diversity and colds is not altered after controlling for life events." Stressful events, such as job changes, correlate with insomnia, impaired sleeping, and health complaints. Research indicates the type of stressor (whether it is acute or chronic) and individual characteristics such as age and physical well-being before the onset of the stressor can combine to determine the effect of stress on an individual. An individual's personality characteristics (such as level of neuroticism), genetics, and childhood experiences with major stressors and traumas may also dictate their response to stressors. Stress may also cause headaches.

Chronic stress and a lack of coping resources available or used by an individual can often lead to the development of psychological issues such as depression and anxiety. This is particularly true regarding chronic stressors. These are stressors that may not be as intense as an acute stressor like a natural disaster or a major accident, but they persist over longer periods of time. These types of stressors tend to have a more negative impact on health because they are sustained and thus require the body's physiological response to occur daily. This depletes the body's energy more quickly and usually occurs over long periods of time, especially when such microstressors cannot be avoided (for example: stress related to living in a dangerous neighborhood). Chronic stress may lead to allostatic load, a biological process affecting many physiological systems. For example, studies have found that caregivers, particularly those of dementia patients, have higher levels of depression and slightly worse physical health than non-caregivers.

Studies have also shown that perceived chronic stress and the hostility associated with Type A personalities are often correlated with much higher risks of cardiovascular disease. This occurs because of the compromised immune system as well as the high levels of arousal in the sympathetic nervous system that occur as part of the body's physiological response to stressful events. However, it is possible for individuals to exhibit hardiness – a term referring to the ability to be both chronically stressed and healthy. Chronic stress can correlate with psychological disorders such as delusions. Pathological anxiety and chronic stress lead to structural degeneration and impaired functioning of the hippocampus.

It has long been believed that negative affective states, such as feelings of anxiety and depression, could influence the pathogenesis of physical disease, which in turn, have direct effects on biological process that could result in increased risk of disease in the end. However, studies done by the University of Wisconsin-Madison and other places have shown this to be partly untrue; although perceived stress seems to increase the risk of reported poor health, the additional perception of stress as something harmful increases the risk even further. For example, when humans are under chronic stress, permanent changes in their physiological, emotional, and behavioral responses are most likely to occur. Such changes could lead to disease. Chronic stress results from stressful events that persist over a relatively long period of time, such as caring for a spouse with dementia, or results from brief focal events that continue to be experienced as overwhelming even long after they are over, such as experiencing a sexual assault.

Experiments show that when healthy human individuals are exposed to acute laboratory stressors, they show an adaptive enhancement of some markers of natural immunity but a general suppression of functions of specific immunity. By comparison, when healthy human individuals are exposed to real-life chronic stress, this stress is associated with a biphasic immune response where partial suppression of cellular and humoral function coincides with low-grade, nonspecific inflammation.

Even though psychological stress is often connected with illness or disease, most healthy individuals can still remain disease-free after confronting chronic stressful events. Also, people who do not believe that stress will affect their health do not have an increased risk of illness, disease, or death. This suggests that there are individual differences in vulnerability to the potential pathogenic effects of stress; individual differences in vulnerability arise due to both genetic and psychological factors. In addition, the age at which the stress is experienced can dictate its effect on health. Research suggests chronic stress at a young age can have lifelong impacts on the biological, psychological, and behavioral responses to stress later in life.

== Social impact ==
=== Communication ===
When someone is stressed, many challenges can arise; a recognised challenge being communication difficulties. Here are some examples of how stress can hinder communication.

The cultures of the world generally fall into two categories; individualistic and collectivistic.

- An individualistic culture, like that of the United States, where everyone is an independent entity defined by their accomplishments and goals.
- A collectivistic culture, like that of many Asian countries, prefers to see individuals as interdependent on each other. They value modesty and family.

These cultural differences can affect how people communicate when they are stressed. For example, a member of an individualistic culture would be hesitant to ask for pain medication for fear of being perceived as weak. A member of a collectivistic culture would not hesitate. They have been brought up in a culture where everyone helps each other and is one functional unit whereas the member of the individualistic culture is not as comfortable asking others for aid.

==== Language barriers ====
Language barriers can cause stress, and sometimes this stress adds to language barriers. People may feel uncomfortable with the difficulties caused by differences in syntax, vocabulary, ways of showing respect, and use of body language. Along with a desire for successful social interactions, being uncomfortable with the communication around a person can discourage them from communicating at all, thus adding to the language barrier.

The System 1 – System 2 model of Daniel Kahneman's Thinking, Fast and Slow and others distinguishes between automatic responses, such as those one's native language provides, and a foreign language that requires System 2 work to translate. System 2 can become "depleted" by conscious mental effort, making it more difficult and stressful.

==== Changes in the home ====
Divorce, death, and remarriage are all disruptive events in a household. Although everyone involved is affected by events such as these, it can be most drastically seen in children. Due to their age, children have relatively undeveloped coping skills. For this reason a stressful event may cause some changes in their behavior. Falling in with a new crowd, developing some new and sometimes undesirable habits are just some of the changes stress may trigger in their lives.

A possible response to stress is talking to an imaginary friend. A child may feel angry with a parent or their peers who they feel brought this change on them. They may need someone to talk to, other than the person with whom they are angry. Talking to an imaginary friend, aloud or using their inner voice, allows for emotion processing but cuts off communication with the real people around the child.

=== Social support and health ===
Researchers have long been interested in how an individual's level and types of social support impact the effect of stress on their health. Studies consistently show that social support can protect against physical and mental consequences of stress. This can occur through a variety of mechanisms. One model, known as the "direct effects" model, holds that social support has a direct, positive impact on health by increasing positive affect, promoting adaptive health behaviors, predictability and stability in life, and safeguarding against social, legal, and economic concerns that could negatively impact health. Another model, the "buffering effect", says that social support exerts greatest influence on health in times of stress, either by helping individuals appraise situations in less threatening manners or coping with the actual stress. Researchers have found evidence to support both these pathways.

Social support is defined more specifically as psychological and material resources provided by a social network that are aimed at helping an individual cope with stress. Researchers generally distinguish among several types of social support: instrumental support – which refers to material aid (e.g., financial support or assistance in transportation to a physician's appointment), informational support (e.g., knowledge, education or advice in problem-solving), and emotional support (e.g., empathy, reassurance, etc.). Social support can reduce the rate of stress during pregnancy. Studies have found that those who had a large change in their life with a small amount of social support has a higher chance of complications. Whereas those with a larger support system would have a chance for less complications.

== Management ==
Stress management refers to a wide spectrum of techniques and psychotherapies aimed at controlling a person's levels of stress, especially chronic stress, usually for the purpose of improving everyday functioning. It involves controlling and reducing the tension that occurs in stressful situations by making emotional and physical changes.

=== Prevention and resilience building ===
Decreasing stressful behaviors is a part of prevention. Some of the common strategies and techniques are: self-monitoring, tailoring, material reinforcement, social reinforcement, social support, self-contracting, contracting with significant other, shaping, reminders, self-help groups, and professional help.

Although many techniques have traditionally been developed to deal with the consequences of stress, considerable research has also been conducted on the prevention of stress, a subject closely related to psychological resilience-building. A number of self-help approaches to stress-prevention and resilience-building have been developed, drawing mainly on the theory and practice of cognitive-behavioral therapy.

Biofeedback may also play a role in stress management. A randomized study by Sutarto et al. assessed the effect of resonant breathing biofeedback (recognize and control involuntary heart rate variability) among manufacturing operators; depression, anxiety and stress significantly decreased.

=== Exercising to reduce stress ===
Studies have shown that exercise reduces stress. Exercise effectively reduces fatigue, improves sleep, enhances overall cognitive function such as alertness and concentration, decreases overall levels of tension, and improves self-esteem. Because many of these are depleted when an individual experiences chronic stress, exercise provides an ideal coping mechanism. Despite popular belief, it is not necessary for exercise to be routine or intense in order to reduce stress; as little as five minutes of aerobic exercise can begin to stimulate anti-anxiety effects. Further, a 10-minute walk may have the same psychological benefits as a 45-minute workout, reinforcing the assertion that exercise in any amount or intensity will reduce stress. Cycling and walking activities have lower stress scores when compared to other modes of transport or commuting.

==== Theoretical explanations ====
A multitude of theories have been presented in attempts to explain why exercise effectively reduces stress. One theory, known as the time-out hypothesis, claims that exercise provides distraction from the stressor. The time out hypothesis claims that exercise effectively reduces stress because it gives individuals a break from their stressors. This was tested in a recent study of college women who had identified studying as their primary stressor. The women were then placed under four conditions at varying times: "rest," "studying," "exercising," and "studying while exercising." The stress levels of the participants were measured through self-assessments of stress and anxiety symptoms after each condition. The results demonstrated that the "exercise" condition had the most significant reduction in stress and anxiety symptoms. These results demonstrate the validity of the time-out hypothesis. It is also important to note that exercise provided greater stress reduction than rest.

=== Coping mechanisms ===
The Lazarus and Folkman model suggests that external events create a form of pressure to achieve, engage in, or experience a stressful situation. Stress is not the external event itself, but rather an interpretation and response to the potential threat; this is when the coping process begins.

There are various ways individuals deal with perceived threats that may be stressful. However, people have a tendency to respond to threats with a predominant coping style, in which they dismiss feelings, or manipulate the stressful situation.

There are different classifications for coping, or defense mechanisms, however they all are variations on the same general idea: There are good/productive and negative/counterproductive ways to handle stress. Because stress is perceived, the following mechanisms do not necessarily deal with the actual situation that is causing an individual stress. However, they may be considered coping mechanisms if they allow the individual to cope better with the negative feelings/anxiety that they are experiencing due to the perceived stressful situation, as opposed to actually fixing the concrete obstacle causing the stress. The following mechanisms are adapted from the DSM-IV Adaptive Functioning Scale, APA, 1994.

While the DSM-IV (1994) categorized defense mechanisms on an "Adaptive Functioning Scale," this multi-axial system was removed in the DSM-5 (2013) and its subsequent revision, the DSM-5-TR (2022). Contemporary psychological models, while still acknowledging defense mechanisms, often classify coping strategies based on their function. A widely accepted model categorizes coping into three main styles:

- Problem-focused coping: This style involves directly addressing the stressor or the situation that is causing stress. Strategies include active problem-solving, planning, seeking instrumental support (e.g., asking for tangible help or information), and time management.
- Emotion-focused coping: This style focuses on regulating the negative emotions associated with the stressor, rather than changing the situation itself. Strategies include seeking emotional support (e.g., talking to friends), reframing the problem positively, practicing mindfulness or relaxation, and using humor.
- Avoidance-focused coping (or dysfunctional coping): This style involves avoiding the stressor and the associated emotions. While it can be useful for short-term relief from overwhelming threats, it is generally considered counterproductive long-term. Strategies include denial, substance use, disengagement, and wishful thinking.

Another way individuals can cope with stress is by the way one perceives stress. Perceptions of stress are critical for making decisions and living everyday life. The outlook or the way an individual perceives the given situation can affect the manner to which the individual handles stress, whether it be positive or negative. Too much stress can be detrimental to the individual and can cause negative psychological and physical health effects.

==== Highly adaptive/active/problem-focused mechanisms ====
These skills are what one could call as "facing the problem head on", or at least dealing with the negative emotions experienced by stress in a constructive manner. (generally adaptive)

- Affiliation ("tend and befriend") – involves dealing with stress by turning to a social network for support, but an individual does not share with others in order to diffuse or avoid the responsibility.
- Humour – the individual steps outside of a situation in order to gain greater perspective, and also to highlight any comic aspect to be found in their stressful circumstances.

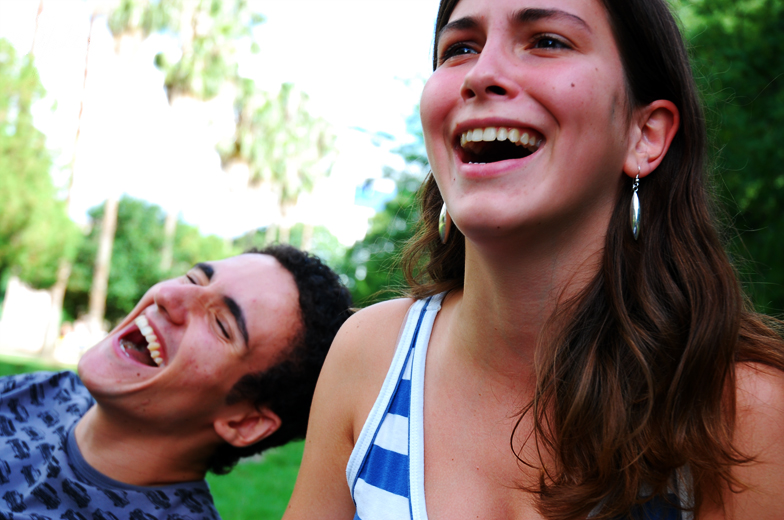
Coping through laughter

"The Association for Applied and Therapeutic Humour defines therapeutic humour as 'any intervention that promotes health and wellness by stimulating a playful discovery, expression or appreciation of the absurdity of or incongruity of life's situations. This intervention may enhance health or be used as a complementary treatment of illness to facilitate healing or coping whether physical, emotional, cognitive, or spiritual".

Sigmund Freud, suggested that humour was an excellent defensive strategy in emotional situations. When one laughs during a tough situation they feel absent from their worries, and this allows them to think differently. When one experiences a different mind set, they feel more in control of their response, and how they would go about dealing with the event that caused stress.

Lefcourt (2001) suggests that this perspective-taking humour is the most effective due to its ability to distance oneself from the situation of great stress. Studies show that the use of laughter and humour creates a sense of relief of stress that can last up to 45 minutes post-laughter.

Also, most hospitalized children have been seen to use laughter and play to relieve their fear, pain and stress. It has been discovered that there is a great importance in the use of laughter and humour in stress coping. Humans should use humour as a means to transcend their original understanding of an external event, take a different perspective, in which their anxiety may be minimized by.

- Sublimation – allows an "indirect resolution of conflict with neither adverse consequences nor consequences marked by loss of pleasure." Essentially, this mechanism allows channeling of troubling emotions or impulses into an outlet that is socially acceptable.
- Positive reappraisal – redirects thoughts (cognitive energy) to good things that are either occurring or have not occurred. This can lead to personal growth, self-reflection, and awareness of the power/benefits of one's efforts. For example, studies on veterans of war or peacekeeping operations indicate that persons who construe a positive meaning from their combat or threat experiences tend to adjust better than those who do not.

Other adaptive coping mechanisms include anticipation, altruism, and self-observation.

==== Mental inhibition/disavowal mechanisms ====
These mechanisms cause the individual to have a diminished (or in some cases non-existent) awareness about their anxiety, threatening ideas, fears, etc., that come from being conscious of the perceived threat.

- Displacement – This is when an individual redirects their emotional feelings about one situation to another, less threatening one.
- Repression – Repression occurs when an individual attempts to remove all their thoughts, feelings, and anything related to the upsetting/stressful (perceived) threat out of their awareness in order to be disconnected from the entire situation. When done long enough in a successful way, this is more than just denial.
- Reaction formation – An attempt to remove any "unacceptable thoughts" from one's consciousness by replacing them with the exact opposite.

Other inhibition coping mechanisms include undoing, dissociation, denial, projection, and rationalization. Although some people claim that inhibition coping mechanisms may eventually increase the stress level because the problem is not solved, detaching from the stressor can sometimes help people to temporarily release the stress and become more prepared to deal with problems later on.

==== Active mechanisms ====
These methods deal with stress by an individual literally taking action, or withdrawing.

- Acting out – Often viewed as counter-normative, or problematic behavior. Instead of reflecting or problem-solving, an individual takes maladaptive action.
- Passive aggression – When an individual indirectly deals with their anxiety and negative thoughts/feelings stemming from their stress by acting in a hostile or resentful manner towards others. Help-Rejecting Complaining can also be included in this category.

==== Health promotion ====
There is an alternative method to coping with stress, in which one works to minimize their anxiety and stress in a preventative manner.

Suggested strategies to improve stress management include:

1. Regular exercise – set up a fitness program, 3–4 times a week
2. Support systems – to listen, offer advice, and support each other
3. Time management – develop an organizational system
4. Guided imagery and visualization – create a relaxing state of mind
5. Progressive muscle relaxation – loosen tense muscle groups
6. Assertiveness training – work on effective communication
7. Journal writing – express true emotion, self-reflection
8. Stress management in the workplace – organize a new system, switch tasks to reduce own stress.

Depending on the situation, all of these coping mechanisms may be adaptive, or maladaptive.

== History ==
Prior to the introduction of the concept "stress" in the psychological sense c. 1955, people already identified a range of more nuanced ideas to describe and confront such emotions as worry, grief, concern, obsession, fear, annoyance, anxiety, distress, suffering and passion. By the 19th century, the popularisation of the nascent science of neurology made it possible to group some undifferentiated combination of one or more of these with an informal diagnosis such as "nerve strain".

"Stress" has subsequently become a mainstay of pop psychology. Though stress is discussed throughout history from many distinct topics and cultures, there is no universal consensus over describing stress. This has led to multiple kinds of research, looking at the different aspects of psychological stress and how it changes over a lifespan.

== See also ==
- Academic stress
- Acute stress reaction
- Adaptive performance
- Cognitive behavioral therapy
- Complex post-traumatic stress disorder
- Conservation of resources theory, stress theory
- Exhaustion disorder
- Henry Murray extreme stress experiments at Harvard 1960s
- Incident stress
- Maladaptation
- Melancholia
- Mental breakdown
- Mindfulness-based stress reduction
- Minority stress
- Occupational stress
- Occupational burnout
- Posttraumatic stress disorder
- Psychological trauma
- Psychoneuroimmunology
- Social stress
- Stress (biology)
