= Csaba Földes =

Hungarian linguist

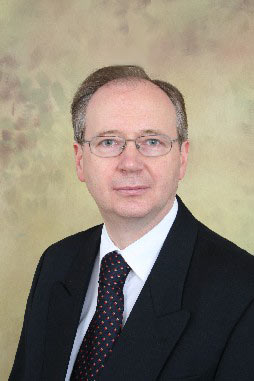
Csaba Földes 2012

Csaba Földes (born June 8, 1958, in Bácsalmás, Hungary) is a linguist. His research is focused on contemporary German language and German as a foreign language. He is currently full professor (W3) and holds the chair of German Linguistics at the University of Erfurt in Germany. Földes is a member of the Hungarian Academy of Sciences and Past President of the Central European Association for German Studies (German: Mitteleuropäischer Germanistenverband).

== Career ==
From 1976 to 1981, Csaba Földes studied German Language and Literature, Slavonic Studies and General Linguistics at the universities of Debrecen (Hungary), Odesa (Ukraine), Moscow, Leipzig and at the Humboldt University of Berlin. After his graduation he was appointed as lecturer at the Language Centre of the Kecskemét University of Applied Sciences and as a lecturer in German as a foreign language at a College of Education. In 1987 he was awarded his doctorate at the University of Jena (Germany).

Between 1985 and 1996 Földes worked as a research assistant, beginning in 1993 as an appointed professor of German at the Teacher Training College ′′Gyula Juhász′′ in Szeged and as a university lecturer at the University of Szeged. In 1997 his habilitation treatise was accepted at the University of Debrecen and Földes thus obtained his postdoctoral lecturer qualification. From 1996 to 2012 he was professor of Linguistics of German at the University of Pannonia in Veszprém. At the same time he held professorships in German Linguistics and German as a foreign language at universities in Germany and Austria. Besides the chair in Veszprém, Földes was also professor of German Studies at the J. Selye University in Komárno (Slovakia). In 2008 he was appointed Doctor of the Hungarian Academy of Sciences.

Since 2012 Földes has been Professor of German Linguistics at the University of Erfurt. In 2013 he was awarded an honorary doctorate (Dr. h.c.) by the Anatoly Omelchenko Theatre University in Volgograd (Russia).

In 2018 he became a member of the Johann Gottfried Herder Forschungsrat and in 2020 he was elected to the Academia Europaea.

== Memberships and positions ==
- member of the International Board of the Institute of German Language (IDS) in Mannheim, Germany,
- advisory board member (1998-2006), vice president (2006-2012) of EUROPHRAS: European Society of Phraseology,
- member of the advisory board of the Association of Intercultural German Studies (GIG),
- member of the International Association of German Studies (IVG),
- member of the Austrian Society of German Studies (ÖGG), member of the New York Academy of Sciences.

At the University of Pannonia in Veszprém, he is the founder and director of the Competence Centre for Intercultural Linguistics and Intercultural German Studies (German: Kompetenzzentrum Interkulturelle Linguistik/Germanistik) and of the International Research and Young Academics Network for Intercultural German Studies (German: Internationalen Forschungs- und Nachwuchsnetzwerks für Interkulturelle Germanistik).

He is co-editor of the Zeitschrift für Mitteleuropäische Germanistik (ZMG), editor of the series Beiträge zur Interkulturellen Germanistik (BIG) and Texte von Kulturen, and was formerly editor of the journal Studia Germanica Universitatis Vesprimiensis (published 1997–2010).

== Research areas ==
Linguistics of German and German as a foreign/second language:

- Language – Culture – Interculturality/Transculturality: Intercultural Linguistics
- Cross-cultural communication
- Bilingualism and multilingualism
- Language policy (especially: the international situation of the German language)
- Contact linguistics, Sociolinguistics
- Phraseology
- Lexicography
- German as a minority language

== Selected publications ==
- Deutsche Rundfunksprache in mehrsprachiger Umwelt. Am Beispiel der Verwendung von Phraseologismen. Wien: Edition Praesens 1995; [coauthor Hécz, Andrea]; ISBN 3-901126-39-2.
- Mehrsprachigkeit, Sprachenkontakt und Sprachenmischung. Flensburg: Univ. 1996 (Flensburger Papiere zur Mehrsprachigkeit und Kulturenvielfalt im Unterricht; 14/15).
- Deutsche Phraseologie kontrastiv: Intra- und interlinguale Zugänge. Heidelberg: Julius Groos Verlag 1996 (Deutsch im Kontrast; Vol. 15); ISBN 3-87276-759-3.
- Német-magyar nagyszótár. Deutsch-Ungarisches Großwörterbuch. Budapest: Akadémiai Kiadó 1998 (Klasszikus Nagyszótárak); [coauthors Halász, Előd and Uzonyi, Pál]; ISBN 963-05-7512-4.
- Magyar-német nagyszótár. Ungarisch-Deutsches Großwörterbuch. Budapest: Akadémiai Kiadó 1998 (Klasszikus Nagyszótárak); [coauthors Halász, Előd and Uzonyi, Pál]; ISBN 963-05-7513-2.
- Interkulturelle Linguistik. Vorüberlegungen zu Konzepten, Problemen und Desiderata. Veszprém: Universitätsverlag/Wien: Edition Praesens 2003 (Studia Germanica Universitatis Vesprimiensis, Suppl.; 1); ISBN 963-9495-20-4, 3-7069-0230-3.
- Kontaktdeutsch: Zur Theorie eines Varietätentyps unter transkulturellen Bedingungen von Mehrsprachigkeit. Tübingen: Gunter Narr Verlag 2005; ISBN 3-8233-6160-0.
- Interkulturelle Kommunikation: Positionen zu Forschungsfragen, Methoden und Perspektiven. Veszprém: Universitätsverlag/Wien: Praesens Verlag 2007 (Studia Germanica Universitatis Vesprimiensis, Suppl.; 7); ISBN 978-963-9696-10-5, 978-3-7069-0442-1.
- [Ed.] Phraseologie disziplinär und interdisziplinär. Tübingen: Gunter Narr Verlag 2009; ISBN 978-3-8233-6534-1.
- [Ed.] Deutsch in soziolinguistischer Sicht. Sprachverwendung in Interkulturalitätskontexten. Tübingen: Gunter Narr Verlag 2010 (Beiträge zur Interkulturellen Germanistik; 1); ISBN 978-3-8233-6571-6.
- [Ed.] Interkulturelle Linguistik im Aufbruch. Das Verhältnis von Theorie, Empirie und Methode. Tübingen: Gunter Narr Verlag 2011 (Beiträge zur Interkulturellen Germanistik; 3); ISBN 978-3-8233-6682-9.
- [Ed.] Interkulturalität unter dem Blickwinkel von Semantik und Pragmatik. Tübingen: Gunter Narr Verlag 2014 (Beiträge zur Interkulturellen Germanistik; 5); ISBN 978-3-8233-6905-9.
- [Ed.] Kontaktvariäteten des Deutschen im Ausland. Tübingen: Gunter Narr Verlag 2021 (Beiträge zur Interkulturellen Germanistik; 14), ISBN 978-3-8233-8304-8
- [Ed.] with Thorsten Roelcke. Handbuch Mehrsprachigkeit. Berlin / Boston: De Gruyter, 2022, ISBN 978-3-11-062016-0
