= Ana María Pascual-Leone Pascual =

Spanish pharmacist and biochemist (born 1930)

Ana María Pascual-Leone
- Born: Ana María Pascual-Leone Pascual; 24 August 1930 (age 96); Valencia, Spain
- Education: University of Barcelona; University of Madrid; Sorbonne
- Known for: Research on perinatal endocrinology and metabolism
- Awards: National Research Prize Reina Sofía (1994)
- Scientific career
- Fields: Pharmacy, biochemistry, perinatal endocrinology
- Workplaces: Spanish National Research Council (CSIC); Institute of Biochemistry (CSIC–Complutense University of Madrid)
- Doctoral advisor: José María García-Blanco Oyarzábal

Ana María Pascual-Leone Pascual (born 24 August 1930) is a Spanish pharmacist and biochemist who worked on perinatal endocrinology and metabolism. Most of her career was spent at the Spanish National Research Council (CSIC) and at its Institute of Biochemistry, a centre run jointly with the Complutense University of Madrid, where her research dealt with hormonal imbalances and malnutrition during pregnancy. She is a member of the Real Academia Nacional de Farmacia, and in 1994 she received the National Research Prize Reina Sofía on the Prevention of Deficiencies.

== Early life and education ==
Pascual-Leone was born in Valencia on 24 August 1930. She came from a Valencian family with a long tradition in pharmacy and medicine. Her father was a paediatrician, and her mother was a pharmacist who had trained at the Pasteur Institute in Paris. She attended the Instituto San Vicente Ferrer in Valencia and, in 1948, qualified as a primary-school teacher (Maestra Nacional) at the city's teacher-training college.

She went on to study pharmacy at the University of Barcelona, graduating in 1953 with the Extraordinary Licentiate Prize. Her doctoral research was supervised by José María García-Blanco Oyarzábal, and she received a doctorate in pharmacy from the University of Madrid in 1956. With a fellowship from the Juan March Foundation she then trained in Paris, where she worked in comparative physiology alongside Alfred Jost, a pioneer of fetal endocrinology, and obtained a Diplôme d'Études Supérieures from the Sorbonne in 1963.

== Career and research ==
Pascual-Leone first joined the Spanish National Research Council (CSIC) as a research fellow. She was appointed a scientific assistant through merit-based competition in 1966 and became a CSIC scientific researcher in 1971. From 1970 she established and led a line of research on the endocrinology and metabolism of animal development at the Institute of Biochemistry, a joint centre of the CSIC and the Complutense University of Madrid. She directed the institute from 1990 to 1995.

In 1985 a grant from the Spanish-North American Joint Committee allowed her to work in the laboratory of Paola Timiras at the University of California, Berkeley, and at a medical centre in San Francisco. She was the principal investigator of national research projects without interruption from 1981 to 2000 and, from 1983, of international projects with France and the United States. In 1995 she was named a scientific researcher ad honorem, and she remained active until her retirement in 2000.

Her work centred on hormonal imbalances and malnutrition during pregnancy, the regulation of carbohydrate metabolism, the thyroid axis, and insulin secretion, as well as the relationship between nutrients and endocrine factors. She published about eighty papers in journals such as Endocrinology, the American Journal of Physiology and the Journal of Neurochemistry, supervised ten doctoral theses, and helped to set up the perinatal biochemistry group of the Spanish Society of Biochemistry.

== Memberships and honours ==
Pascual-Leone was first elected a corresponding member of the Real Academia Nacional de Farmacia and later a full (numerary) academician, occupying Medal 14. She delivered her inaugural address, Visión endocrina actual de las interconexiones celulares: la familia de la insulina, on 13 December 2001. She was a vice-president of the academy in 2007, gave the opening address of its 2008 academic year on 17 January 2008, and subsequently became a supernumerary academician. In 2021 she was made the first honorary academician of the Academia de Farmacia de la Comunitat Valenciana.

Her distinctions include the "Best Scientific Work of the Year" award of the College of Pharmacists of Alicante, granted jointly with the University of Granada (1966), the silver medal of the Académie Internationale de Lutèce in Paris (1976), the Alter (1978) and Abelló (1979) prizes of the Real Academia Nacional de Farmacia, the National Research Prize Reina Sofía on the Prevention of Deficiencies (1994), and the gold medal of the Faculty of Pharmacy of the Complutense University of Madrid (2006), awarded for her work at the Institute of Biochemistry.

== Selected works ==
- Retroceso en el tiempo: la investigación biomédica en España. Testimonios y reflexiones (ed.). Madrid: Fundación Areces / Real Academia Nacional de Farmacia, 2012.
