= Hans Selye =

Austro-Hungarian scientist (1907–1982)

Hans Selye CC
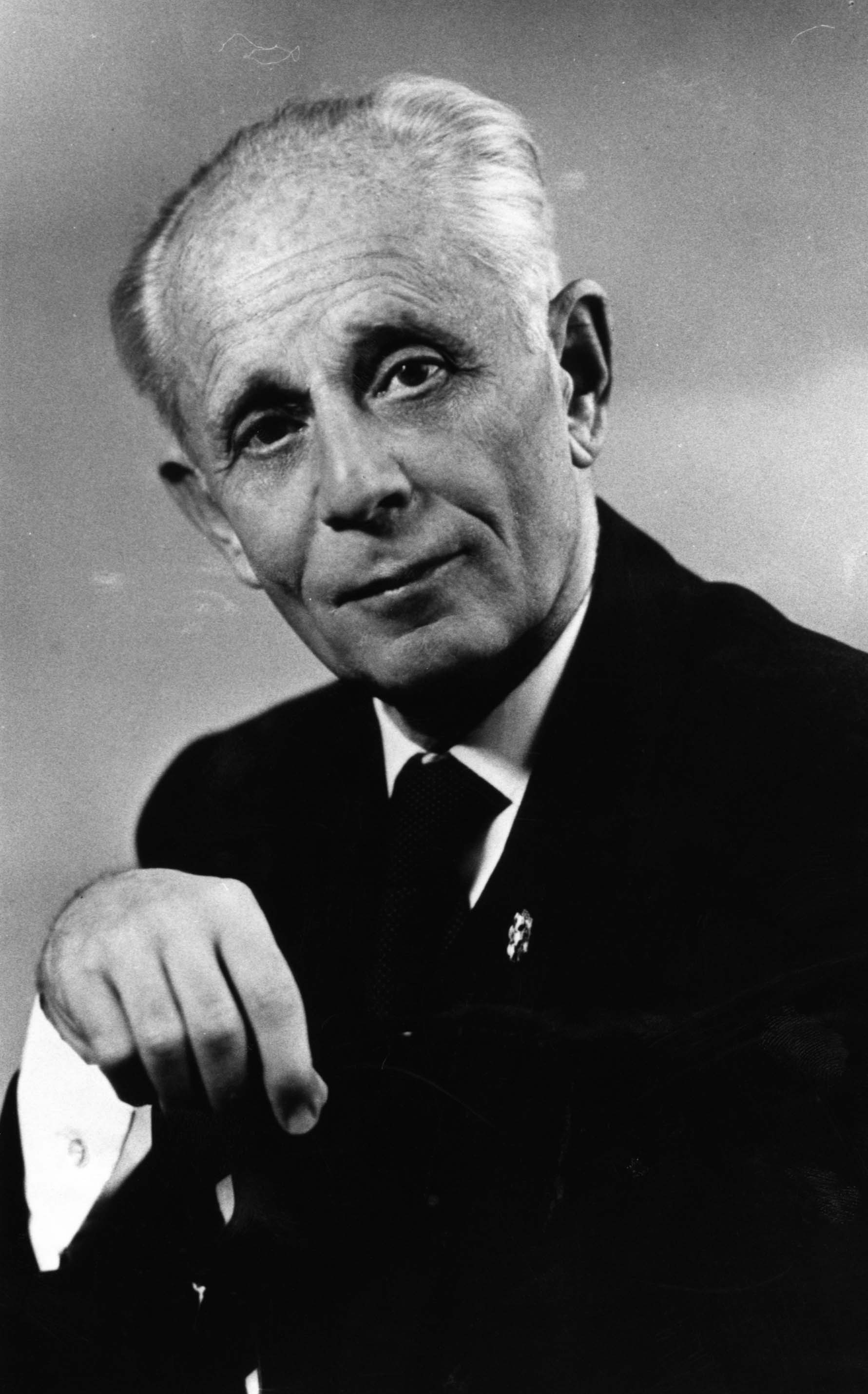
- Selye in the 1970s
- Born: January 26, 1907; Vienna, Austria-Hungary
- Died: October 16, 1982 (aged 75); Montreal, Quebec, Canada
- Other name: Selye János (Hungarian)

János Hugo Bruno "Hans" Selye (/ˈsɛljeɪ/; Hungarian: Selye János Hungarian pronunciation: [ˈʃɛjɛ]; January 26, 1907 – October 16, 1982) was a Hungarian-Canadian endocrinologist who conducted important scientific work on the hypothetical non-specific response of an organism to stressors. Although he did not recognize all of the many aspects of glucocorticoids, Selye was aware of their role in the stress response.

== Biography ==
Selye was born in Vienna, Austria-Hungary on January 26, 1907, and grew up in Komárom (the town with Hungarian majority in present-day Slovakia was cut by the Treaty of Trianon in 1920). Selye's father was a doctor of Hungarian ethnicity and his mother was Austrian. He became a Doctor of Medicine and Chemistry in Prague in 1929 and went on to do pioneering work in stress and endocrinology at Johns Hopkins University, McGill University, and the Université de Montréal. He was nominated for the Nobel Prize in Physiology or Medicine for the first time in 1949. Although he received a total of 17 nominations (1949–1953) in his career, he never won the prize.

Selye died on October 16, 1982, in Montreal, Quebec, Canada. He often returned to visit Hungary, giving lectures as well as interviews in Hungarian television programs. He conducted a lecture in 1973 at the Hungarian Scientific Academy in Hungarian and observers noted that he had no accent, despite spending many years abroad. His book The Stress of Life appeared in Hungarian as Az Életünk és a stressz in 1964 and became a bestseller. Selye János University, the only Hungarian-language university in Slovakia, was named after him. Selye's mother was killed by gunfire during Hungary's anti-Communist revolt of 1956.

== Stress research ==
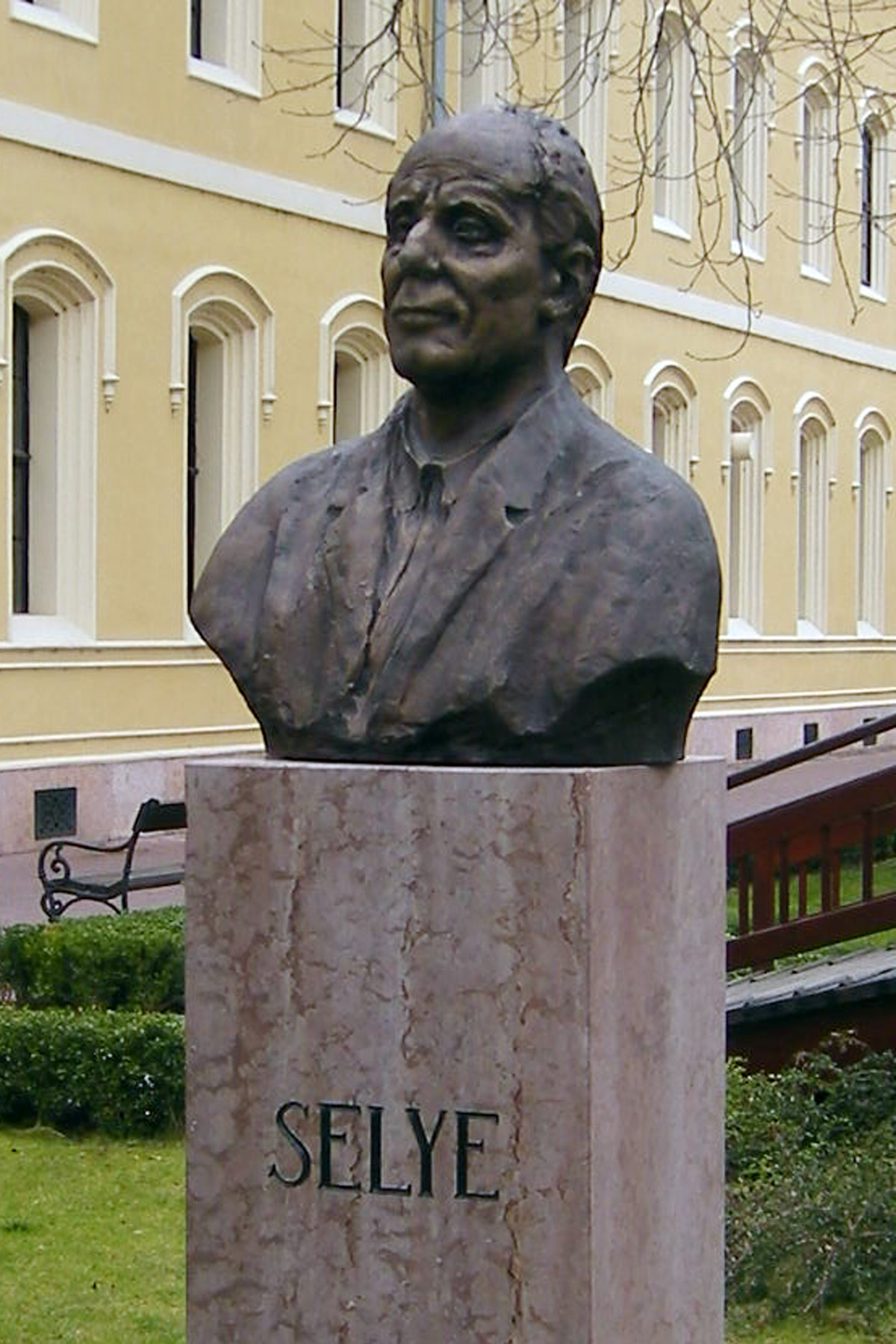
Bust of Hans Selye at Selye János University, Komárno, Slovakia

Selye's interest in stress began when he was in medical school; he had observed that patients with various chronic illnesses like tuberculosis and cancer appeared to display a common set of symptoms that he attributed to what is now commonly called stress. After completing his medical degree and a doctorate degree in organic chemistry at the German University of Prague, he received a Rockefeller Foundation fellowship to study (1931) at Johns Hopkins in Baltimore and later moved to the Department of Biochemistry at McGill University in Montreal in 1932 where he studied under the sponsorship of James Bertram Collip (1892–1965). While working with laboratory animals, Selye observed a phenomenon that he thought resembled what he had previously seen in chronic patients. Rats exposed to cold, drugs, or surgical injury exhibited a common pattern of responses to these stressors. (A stressor is a chemical or biological agent, environmental condition, external stimulus or an event seen as causing stress to an organism.)

Selye initially (c. 1940s) called this the "general adaptation syndrome" (at the time it was also called "Selye's syndrome"), but he later rebaptized it with the simpler term "stress response". According to Selye the general adaptation syndrome is triphasic, involving an initial alarm phase followed by a stage of resistance or adaptation and, finally, a stage of exhaustion and death (these phases were established largely on the basis of glandular states). Working with doctoral student Thomas McKeown (1912–1988), Selye published a report that used the word "stress" to describe these responses to adverse events.

His last inspiration for general adaptation syndrome came from an experiment in which he injected mice with extracts of various organs. He at first believed that he had discovered a new hormone, but was proved wrong when every irritating substance he injected produced the same symptoms (swelling of the adrenal cortex, atrophy of the thymus, gastric and duodenal ulcers). This, paired with his observation that people with different diseases exhibit similar symptoms, led to his description of the effects of "noxious agents" as he at first called it. He later adopted the term "stress", which has been accepted into the lexicon of many languages.

Selye argued that stress differs from other physical responses in that it is identical whether the provoking impulse is positive or negative. He called negative stress "distress" and positive stress "eustress".

The system whereby the body copes with stress, the hypothalamic-pituitary-adrenal axis (HPA axis) system, was also first described by Selye.

Selye acknowledged the influence of Claude Bernard (1813–1878), who developed the idea of milieu intérieur, and of the "homeostasis" of Walter Cannon (1871–1945). Selye conceptualized the physiology of stress as having two components: a set of responses which he called the "general adaptation syndrome", and the development of a pathological state from ongoing, unrelieved stress.

While Selye's work attracted continued support from advocates of psychosomatic medicine, many in experimental physiology concluded that his concepts were too vague and unmeasurable. During the 1950s, Selye turned away from the laboratory to promote his concept through popular books and lecture tours. He wrote both for non-academic physicians and an international bestseller entitled The Stress of Life (1956). From the late 1960s, academic psychologists started to adopt Selye's concept of stress, and he followed The Stress of Life with two other books for the general public, From Dream to Discovery: On Being a Scientist (1964) and Stress without Distress (1974). The idea of "stress" resonated with humanistic psychology, and pop psychology generalised the concept.

Hans Selye's last and greatest academic publication was his book, "The Mast Cells" (1965), which was an organized review of thousands of publications in the preceding century. Mast cells secrete histamine, proteolytic enzymes and other mediators of vascular responses to injury, infection, allergy and other stresses. Selye acknowledged the work of numerous research trainees at the Université de Montréal who collected the information for this mega-review.

Selye worked as a professor and director of the Institute of Experimental Medicine and Surgery at the Université de Montréal. In 1975 he founded the International Institute of Stress, and in 1979, Selye and Arthur Antille started the Hans Selye Foundation. Later Selye and eight Nobel laureates founded the Canadian Institute of Stress.

In 1968 he was made a Companion of the Order of Canada. In 1976 Concordia University awarded him the Loyola Medal. In 1976, he received the American Academy of Achievement's Golden Plate Award at a Banquet of the Golden Plate ceremony in San Diego, California.

== Controversy and involvement with the tobacco industry ==
Although it was not widely known at the time, Selye began consulting for the tobacco industry starting in 1958; he had previously sought funding from the industry, but had been denied. Later, New York attorney Edwin Jacob contacted Selye as he prepared a defense against liability actions brought against tobacco companies. The companies wanted Selye's help in arguing that the recognized correlation between smoking and cancer was not proof of causality. The firm offered to pay Selye $1000 to make a statement supporting this claim. He agreed but refused to testify. Tobacco industry lawyers reported that Selye was willing to incorporate industry advice when writing about smoking and stress. One lawyer advised him to "comment on the unlikelihood of there being a mechanism by which smoking could cause cardiovascular disease” and to emphasize the "stressful" effect that anti-smoking messages had on the US population.

Publicly, Selye never declared his consultancy work for the tobacco industry. In a 1967 letter to "Medical Opinion and Review", he argued against government over-regulation of science and public health, implying that his views on smoking were objective: "I purposely avoided any mention of government-supported research because, being too largely dependent upon it, I may not be able to view the subject objectively. However, I do not use … cigarettes so let these examples suffice." In June 1969, Selye (then director of the Institute of Experimental Pathology, University of Montreal) testified before the Canadian House of Commons Health Committee against anti-smoking legislation, opposing advertising restrictions, health warnings, and restrictions on tar and nicotine. For his testimony Selye was funded $50,000 per year for a 3-year "special project", by William Thomas Hoyt, executive of Council for Tobacco Research, with another $50,000 a year pledged by the Canadian tobacco industry. His comments on smoking were used worldwide; Philip Morris used Selye's statements on the benefits of smoking to argue against the use of health warnings on tobacco products in Sweden. Similarly, in 1977 the Australian Cigarette Manufacturers quoted Selye extensively in their submission to the Australian Senate Standing Committee on Social Welfare.

In 1999, the United States Department of Justice brought an anti-racketeering case against 7 tobacco companies –British American Tobacco, Brown & Williamson, Philip Morris, Liggett, American Tobacco Company, RJ Reynolds, and Lorillard– plus the Council for Tobacco Research, and the Tobacco Institute. As a result, the industry's influence on stress research was revealed.

== Former graduate students ==
- Roger Guillemin
- Paola S. Timiras

== Publications ==
- "A Syndrome Produced by Diverse Nocuous Agents" - 1936 article by Hans Selye from The journal of neuropsychiatry and clinical neurosciences
- The Stress of Life. New York: McGraw-Hill, 1956, ISBN 978-0070562127
- Selye, H. (Oct 7, 1955). "Stress and disease". Science. 122 (3171): 625–631. Bibcode:1955Sci...122..625S. doi:10.1126/science.122.3171.625. PMID 13255902.
- From Dream to Discovery: On being a scientist. New York: McGraw-Hill 1964, ISBN 978-0405066160
- The Mast Cells. Washington: Butterworths 1965. 498 pages.
- Hormones and Resistance. Berlin; New York: Springer-Verlag, 1971, ISBN 978-3540054115
- Stress Without Distress. Philadelphia: J. B. Lippincott Co., c1974, ISBN 978-0397010264

== See also ==
- Science and technology in Canada
- Alvin Toffler
