= Eustress =

Beneficial stress

The term eustress means "beneficial stress"—either psychological, physical (e.g., exercise), or biochemical/radiological (hormesis).

The word was introduced by endocrinologist Hans Selye (1907–1982) in 1976; he combined the Greek prefix eu- meaning "good", and the English word stress, to give the literal meaning "good stress". The Oxford English Dictionary traces early use of the word (in psychological usage) to 1968.

Eustress is the positive cognitive response to stress that is healthy, or gives one a feeling of fulfilment or other positive feelings. Hans Selye created the term as a subgroup of stress to differentiate the wide variety of stressors and manifestations of stress.

Eustress is not defined by the stress or type, but rather how one perceives that stressor (e.g., a negative threat versus a positive challenge). Eustress refers to a positive response one has to a stressor, which can depend on one's current feelings of control, desirability, location, and timing of the stressor. Thus, the suggestion in a book title: Eustress and Distress: Neither Good Nor Bad, but Rather the Same?. Potential indicators of eustress may include responding to a stressor with a sense of meaning, hope, or vigor. Eustress has also been positively correlated with life satisfaction and well-being.

== Definition ==
Eustress occurs when the gap between what one has and what one wants is slightly pushed, but not overwhelmed. The goal is not too far out of reach but is still slightly more than one can handle. This fosters challenge and motivation since the goal is in sight. The function of challenge is to motivate a person toward improvement and a goal. Challenge is an opportunity-related emotion that allows people to achieve unmet goals. Eustress is indicated by hope and active engagement. Eustress has a significantly positive correlation with life satisfaction and hope. It is typically assumed that experiencing chronic stress, either in the form of distress or eustress, is negative. However, eustress can instead fuel physiological thriving by positively influencing the underlying biological processes implicated in physical recovery and immunity.

== Measurement ==
Occupational eustress may be measured on subjective levels such as of quality of life or work life, job pressure, psychological coping resources, complaints, overall stress level, and mental health. Other subjective methodological practices have included interviews with focus groups asking about stressors and stress level. In one study participants were asked to remember a past stressful event and then answer questionnaires on coping skills, job well-being, and appraisal of the situation (viewing the stressful event as a challenge or a threat). Common subjective methodologies were incorporated in a holistic stress model created in 2007 to acknowledge the importance of eustress, particularly in the workplace. This model uses hope, positive affect, meaningfulness, and manageability as a measure of eustress, and negative psychological states, negative affect, anxiety, and anger as a measure of distress. Objective measures have also been used and include blood pressure rate, muscle tension, and absenteeism rates. Further physiological research has looked for neuroendocrine changes as a result of eustress and distress. Research has shown that catecholamines change rapidly to pleasurable stimuli. Studies have demonstrated that eustress and distress produce different responses in the neuroendocrine system, particularly dependent on the amount of personal control one feels over a stressor.

== Compared with distress ==
Yerkes–Dodson curve for a difficult task

Distress is the most commonly referred to type of stress, having negative implications, whereas eustress is usually related to desirable events in a person's life. Selye first differentiated the two in an article he wrote in 1975. In this article Selye argued that persistent stress that is not resolved through coping or adaptation should be known as distress, and may lead to anxiety, withdrawal, and depressive behavior. In contrast, if stress enhances one's functioning it may be considered eustress. Both can be equally taxing on the body, and are cumulative in nature, depending on a person's way of adapting to the stressor that caused it. The body itself cannot physically discern between distress or eustress. Differentiation between the two is dependent on one's perception of the stress, but it is believed that the same stressor may cause both eustress and distress. One context that this may occur in is societal trauma (e.g. the black death, World War II) which may cause great distress, but also eustress in the form of hardiness, coping, and fostering a sense of community. The Yerkes–Dodson model demonstrates the optimum balance of stress with a bell curve (shown in the image in the top right). This model is supported by research demonstrating emotional-coping and behavioral-coping strategies are related to changes in perceived stress level on the Yerkes–Dodson Curve. However, the Yerkes-Dodson Curve has become increasingly questioned. A review of the psychological literature pertaining work performance, found that less than 5% of papers supported the inverted U-shaped curve whereas nearly 50% found a “negative linear” relationship (any level of stress inhibits performance).

== Occupational ==
Much of the research on eustress has focused on its presence in the workplace. In the workplace, stress can often be interpreted as a challenge, which generally denotes positive eustress, or as a hindrance, which refers to distress that interferes with one's ability to accomplish a job or task.

Research has focused on increasing eustress in the workplace, in an effort to promote positive reactions to an inevitably stressful environment. Companies are interested in learning more about eustress and its positive effects to increase productivity. Eustress creates a better environment for employees, which makes them perform better and cost less. Occupational stress costs the United States somewhere in between 200 and 300 billion dollars per year. If this were eustress instead of distress, these companies might potentially retain a portion of these losses and the U.S. economy could improve as well. Stress has also been linked to the six leading causes of death: "disease, accidents, cancer, liver disease, lung ailments, suicide." If workers get sick and/or die, there is obviously a cost to the company in sick time and training new employees. It is better to have productive, happy employees. Eustress is necessary for achievement. Eustress is related to well-being and positive attitudes, and thus, increases work performance.

Other scholars within the positive organizational behavior movement tend to deemphasize the instrumental advantages of eustress to organizations; such scholars theorize that managing for eustress is more appropriately viewed as a means for improving worker well-being than a performance/motivation/profit-seeking manipulation. This line of exploration emphasizes minimizing distress and optimizing eustress. These scholars explicitly note that the utility of eustress has limits, and that typically positive stressors experienced in too high of an amplitude or of excessive duration can result in individual distress.

Techniques such as stress management interventions (SMI) have been employed to increase occupational eustress. SMIs often incorporate exercise, meditation, and relaxation techniques to decrease distress and increase positive perceptions of stress in the workplace. Rather than decrease stress in the workplace, SMI techniques attempt to increase eustress with positive reactions to stressful stimuli. Working within the Challenge-Hindrance Framework, positive primary interventions focus on relating stressors to the accomplishment of goals and personal development.

== Self-efficacy ==
Eustress is primarily based on perceptions. It is how you perceive your given situation and how you perceive your given task. It is not what is actually happening, but a person's perception of what is happening. Eustress is thus related to self-efficacy. Self-efficacy is one's judgment of how they can carry out a required task, action or role. Some contributing factors are a person's beliefs about the effectiveness about their options for courses of action and their ability to perform those actions. If a person has low self-efficacy, they will see the demand as more distressful than eustressful because the perceived level of what the person has is lower. When a person has high self-efficacy, they can set goals higher and be motivated to achieve them. The goal then is to increase self-efficacy and skill in order to enable people to increase eustress.

== Flow ==
When an individual appraises a situation as stressful, they add the label for distress or eustress to the issue at hand. If a situation induces eustress, the person may feel motivated and can experience flow. Positive psychologist, Mihaly Csikszentmihalyi, created this concept which is described as the moments when one is completely absorbed into an enjoyable activity with no awareness of surroundings. Flow is an extremely productive state in which an individual experiences their prime performance. The core elements are absorption, enjoyment and intrinsic motivation.

Flow is the "ultimate eustress experience – the epitome of eustress". Hargrove, Nelson and Cooper described eustress as being focused on a challenge, fully present and exhilarated, which almost exactly mirrors the definition of flow. Flow is considered a peak experience or "the single most joyous, happiest, most blissful moment of your life." Hargrove, Becker, and Hargrove build upon this work by modeling positive interventions that may lead to thriving and savoring.

== Factors ==
There are several factors that may increase or decrease one's chances of experiencing eustress and, through eustress, experiencing flow.

- Stress is also influenced by hereditary predispositions and expectations of society. Thus, a person could already be at a certain advantage or disadvantage toward experiencing eustress.
- If a person enjoys experiencing new things and believes they have importance in the world, they are more likely to experience flow.
- Flow is negatively related to self-directedness, or an extreme sense of autonomy.
- Persistence is positively related to flow and closely related to intrinsic motivation.
- People with an internal locus of control, have an increased chance of flow because they believe they can increase their skill level to match the challenge.
- Perfectionism, however, is negatively related to flow. A person downplays their skill levels therefore making the gap too big, and they perceive the challenge to be too large to experience flow. On the opposite end of perfectionism, however, there are increased chances of flow.
- Active procrastination is positively related to flow. By actively delaying work, the person increases the challenge. Then once the challenge is matched with the person's high skill levels, the person can experience flow. Those who passively procrastinate or do not procrastinate do not have these same experiences. It is only with the purposeful procrastination that a person is able to increase the challenge.
- Mindset is a significant factor in determining distress versus eustress. Optimistic people and those with high self-esteem contribute to eustress experiences. The positive mindset increases the chances of eustress and a positive response to stressors. Currently, the predominant mindset toward stress is that stress is debilitating. However, mindsets toward stress can be changed.

== See also ==
- Distress, the opposite of eustress
- Hans Selye, who founded this theory of stress
