= Paola S. Timiras =

American endocrinologist

Paola S. Timiras, born Paola Silvestri, (July 21, 1923, Rome – September 12, 2008, Berkeley, California) was an endocrinologist studying stress.

== Background and education ==
Paola Silvestri was born on July 21, 1923, in Rome, Italy, just after Italy's takeover by Mussolini and his Fascist movement. Her father, a statistician and strong anti-Fascist, fled the following year to France, where his daughter visited often. Even as a girl, she dreamed of becoming a doctor, like her grandfather and uncle.

Silvestri obtained her medical degree from the University of Rome La Sapienza in 1947. She married Romanian diplomat Nicholas Timiras and then moved with him to Canada where she studied experimental medicine and surgery at the Université de Montréal, gaining her doctorate in 1952. During her postdoctoral work at the University of Montreal her supervisor was the endocrinologist Hans Selye. One of Timiras's colleagues was Roger Guillemin.

Timiras performed her doctoral research at the University of Montreal in the lab of Hans Selye, who had developed the first theories about the body's hormonal responses to stress. At his suggestion, Timiras applied for and won a research fellowship that allowed her to work in his lab. There, she studied how stress influences the immune system through the effects of adrenocortical hormones.

== Teaching and research ==
Before she finished her degree, the University of Montreal hired her as an assistant professor. In 1954, she moved to Salt Lake City to pursue that line of inquiry in the pharmacology department at the University of Utah. In 1955, she joined the University of California, Berkeley physiology department as an assistant physiologist and was appointed to the faculty in 1958. She became a full professor in 1967.

At UC Berkeley, Timiras studied the effects of caloric restriction on various hypothalamic nuclei, specifically the effects on cell density, estrogen receptor alpha (ERα) immunoreactivity and insulin-like growth factor-1 (IGF-1) receptor immunoreactivity.

In the 1960s, Timiras developed a course on the physiology of aging, one of the first such courses in the United States. In 2001, at age 78, Timiras became one of the founding members of the Center for Research and Education on Aging at the University of California, Berkeley, for which she served as the first chair.

== Output and death ==
She contributed to or edited over 420 articles and 15 books before her death at the age of 85 of heart failure on September 12, 2008, after putting in a full day's work. Timiras had recently had heart valve replacement surgery. Nicholas Timiras, her husband of nearly 50 years, who had earned a Ph.D. degree in Italian from UC Berkeley in 1978 (at age 66), died in 1996. They had a daughter and a son.

== Honors and awards ==
- 1970: President, Iota Sigma Pi, Association of Women Chemists
- 1974-1982: Vice-President and President, International Society of Psychoneuroendocrinology
- 1978-1982: President, International Society of Developmental Neuroscience
- 1984: Silver Award from the University of Chieti Medical School, Italy, for consultation on establishing courses on aging
- 1985: Gold Medal for Research Award, American Aging Association
- 1987: Andres Bello Decoration from Venezuela for contributing to international biomedical advancement
- 1990: Medal from University of Paris, XI, for promotion of joint Paris XI-UC Berkeley programs in biomedical sciences
- 1991: Medal from University of Pau (France), for fostering France-USA cultural relations
- 1996: Medal from University of Pisa (Italy), for fostering Italy-USA scientific/ biomedical relations

=== Paola S. Timiras Memorial Prize in Cell & Developmental Biology ===
The Department of Molecular and Cell Biology at UC Berkeley annually gives the Paola S. Timiras Memorial Prize to the top undergraduate in Cell & Developmental Biology.

== Publications ==
=== Articles ===
According to the Web of Science her 5 most cited papers are:

1. Woolley DE, Timiras PS (February 1962). "The gonad-brain relationship: effects of female sex hormones on electroshock convulsions in the rat". Endocrinology. 70 (2): 196–209. doi:10.1210/endo-70-2-196. PMID 14008291.
2. Terasawa E, Timiras PS (August 1968). "Electrical activity during the estrous cycle of the rat: cyclic changes in limbic structures". Endocrinology. 83 (2): 207–216. doi:10.1210/endo-83-2-207. PMID 4874282.
3. Woolley DE, Timiras PS (February 1962). "Estrous and circadian periodicity and electroshock convulsions in rats". The American Journal of Physiology. 202 (2): 379–382. doi:10.1152/ajplegacy.1962.202.2.379. PMID 14008290.
4. Hudson DB, Valcana T, Bean G, Timiras PS (1976). "Glutamic Acid - Strong candidate as neurotransmitter of cerebellar granule cell". Neurochemical Research. 1 (1): 73–81. doi:10.1007/BF00965633. PMID 24271246. S2CID 9746187.
5. Brizzee KR, Sherwood N, Timiras PS (July 1968). "A comparison of cell populations at various depth levels in cerebral cortex of young adult and aged Long-Evans rats". Journal of Gerontology. 23 (3): 289–97. doi:10.1093/geronj/23.3.289. PMID 5663608.

=== Books ===
- Physiological Basis of Aging And Geriatrics by Paola S. Timiras, August 2007 4th edition
- Stress, Adaptation, Longevite by Paola S. Timiras, January 2004
- Physiological Basis of Aging and Geriatrics, by Paola S. Timiras (Editor), September 2002 3rd edition
- Studies of Aging : Lab Manual, by Paola S. Timiras (Editor), Hal Sternberg (Editor), September 1999
- Genetic Aberrancies and Neurodegenerative Disorders, by Paola S. Timiras (Editor), E. Edward Bittar (Editor), Mark P. Mattson (Editor), October 1998
- Advances in Cell Aging and Gerontology : The Aging Brain, by Paola S. Timiras (Editor), E. Edward Bittar (Editor), Mark P. Mattson (Editor), James, W. Geddes (Editor), March 1998
- Brain Plasticity : Development and Aging, by Paola S. Timiras (Editor), Antonia Vernadakis (Editor), Guido Filogamo (Editor), Alain M. Privat (Editor), Fulvia Gremo (Editor), December 1997
- Advances in Cell Aging and Gerontology : Some Aspects of the Aging Process, by Paola S. Timiras (Editor), E. Edward Bittar (Editor), October 1996
- Hormones and Aging, by Paola S. Timiras, Antonia Vernadakis (Editor), Wilbur D. Quay, April 1995
- Physiological Basis of Aging and Geriatrics, by Paola S. Timiras (Editor), October 1994 2nd edition
- Plasticity and Regeneration of the Nervous System, by Paola S. Timiras, Ezio Giacobini (Editor), Alain Privat, December 1991
- Handbook of Human Growth and Developmental Biology : Developmental Biology of Organs and Systems Part A Muscle, Blood, and Immunity, by Paola S. Timiras (Editor), Esmail Meisami, January 1991
- Handbook of Human Growth and Developmental Biology : Endocrines, Sexual Development, Growth, Nutrition, and Metabolism/Part B Growth, Nutrition, and, by Paola S. Timiras (Editor), Esmial Meisami, February 1990
- Handbook of Human Growth and Developmental Biology : Endocrines, Sexual Development, Growth, Nutrition, and Metabolism/Part A Endocrines and Sexual, by Paola S. Timiras (Editor), Esmail Meisami, October 1989
- Handbook of Human Growth and Developmental Biology, Part B : Sensory, Motor, and Integrative Development, by Paola S. Timiras (Editor), Esmail Meisami, October 1988
- Handbook of Human Growth and Development, Part A, Developmental Neurobiology, by Paola S. Timiras (Editor), Esmail Meisami, September 1988
- Model Systems of Development and Aging of the Nervous System, by Paola S. Timiras, Jean M. Lauder, Antonia Vernadakis, Alain Privat, Gi, August 1987,
- A Stereotaxic Atlas of the Developing Rat Brain, by Paola S. Timiras, Nancy Sherwood, January 1970
