= Academic stress =

Stress experienced by students

Academic stress is a form of psychological stress associated with the demands and pressures of educational environments. It can arise from factors such as academic workload, exams, deadlines, competition, perfectionism, expectations from parents and teacher and concerns about academic performance. It is experienced by multiple students across different educational levels, such as primary, secondary and higher education.

The experience of academic stress varies according to each individual's circumstances, as academic demands and coping methods differ. While some levels of stress may motivate students to prepare for academic tasks, excessive stress can potentially lead to psychological distress, physical symptoms, academic exhaustion and difficulties in studying.

Excessive academic stress may lead to generative artificial intelligence dependency (GAID).

== Causes of academic stress ==
Academic stress can occur from a combination of academic, social and personal factors. The intensity of stress experienced by students depends on how they view educational demands and their ability to manage them.

A demanding academic workload, including assignments, projects, reading requirements and exams, can contribute to academic stress. Students may experience increased pressure when multiple deadlines coincide or when the amount of required work exceeds the time and resources available to complete it.

Exams, tests, and other forms of academic assessment are commonly reported sources of academic stress. Concerns regarding grades, failure and future educational opportunities can increase pressure, particularly when students view exams as having a significant impact on their academic progression.

Expectations from parents, teachers and peers can contribute to academic pressure. Students may experience stress when they feel that their academic performance does not meet the expectations of others or their own standards.

== Effects of academic stress on students ==
Academic stress can affect students' mental well-being, physical health, academic functioning and social relationships. The effects may vary depending on the intensitity and duration of stress, as well as individual coping mechanisms and environmental factors.

Academic stress can affect students of all ages differently depending on their experiences. Younger students in preschool and kindergarten may show physical symptoms such as headaches or stomach aches, along with changes in behavior and emotion. As students head into elementary and middle school, they are prone to experiencing more anxiety and feelings of loneliness due to stress.

Academic stress is affiliated with psychological difficulties and mental health problems, including anxiety, depressive symptoms, emotional exhaustion and reduced psychological well-being. Concerns about academic achievement, exams, and future educational prosperity may contribute to feelings of uncertainty and persistent worry.

Students experiencing academic stress may report physical symptoms such as, fatigue, sleep deprivation and changes in appetite. Prolonged stress may also affect sleep quality and general physical well-being.

Academic stress may interfere with concentration, memory, motivation and students' ability to complete academic tasks. High levels of stress have been associated with difficulties in academic functioning and may contribute to academic exhaustion or burnout.

Academic pressure can influence students' social relationships and daily behaviour. Some students may reduce their participation in social activities to dedicate their free time to studying, while others may experience difficulties maintaining relationships due to academic duties.

== Coping methods ==
Students use a variety of methods to manage academic stress. These include organising academic responsibilities, seeking social support, engaging in physically activities and using psychological techniques to manage stressful situations.

Time management and planning can help students organise academic responsibilities and mange competing demands. Strategies include establishing priorities, setting realistic goals, dividing larger assignments into smaller tasks and preparing study schedules. Strategic planning has been identified as an active coping method associated with fewer reported stress symptoms among university students.

Physical activity, including exercise and participation in recreational activities, is among the strategies reported by university students for managing stress. Relaxation practices and maintaining regular sleeping and eating habits may also form part of students' approaches to stress management.

Seeking social support is another method used by students to manage academic stress. Friends, family members, classmates and teachers can provide emotional reassurance, advice and practical assistance. Research involving university students has identified social support seeking as a coping method associated with lower self-reported stress symptoms.

Psychological coping strategies include positive reappraisal, problem-solving and mindfulness practices. Positive reappraisal involves interpreting challenging situations in a more constructive way, while problem-solving focuses on identifying difficulties and taking steps to address them. Cognitive and mindfulness-based interventions have also been studied as approaches to reducing stress among university students.
