= Stress (biology) =

Organism's response to a stressor such as an environmental condition or a stimulus

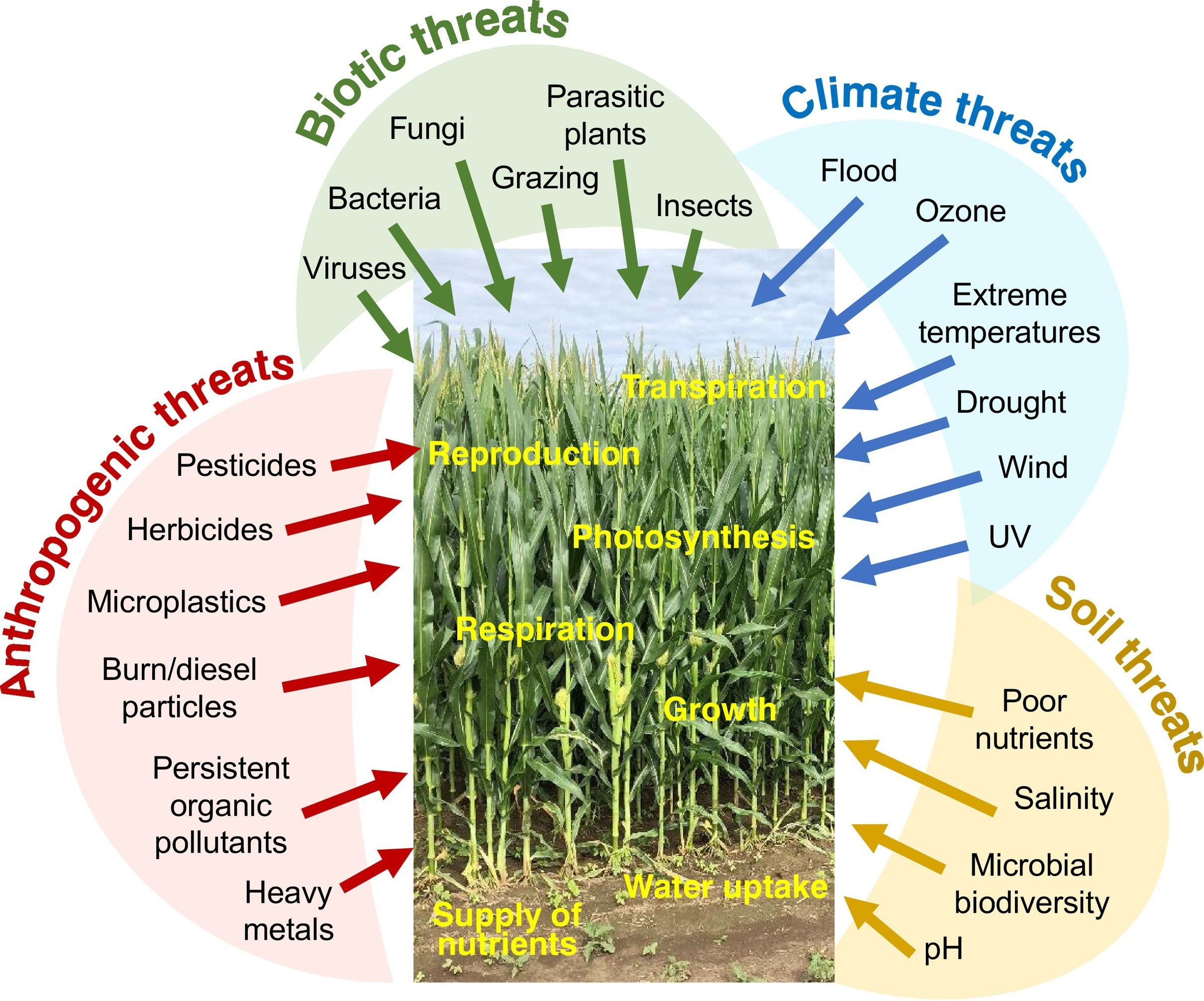
Schematic overview of the classes of stresses in plants

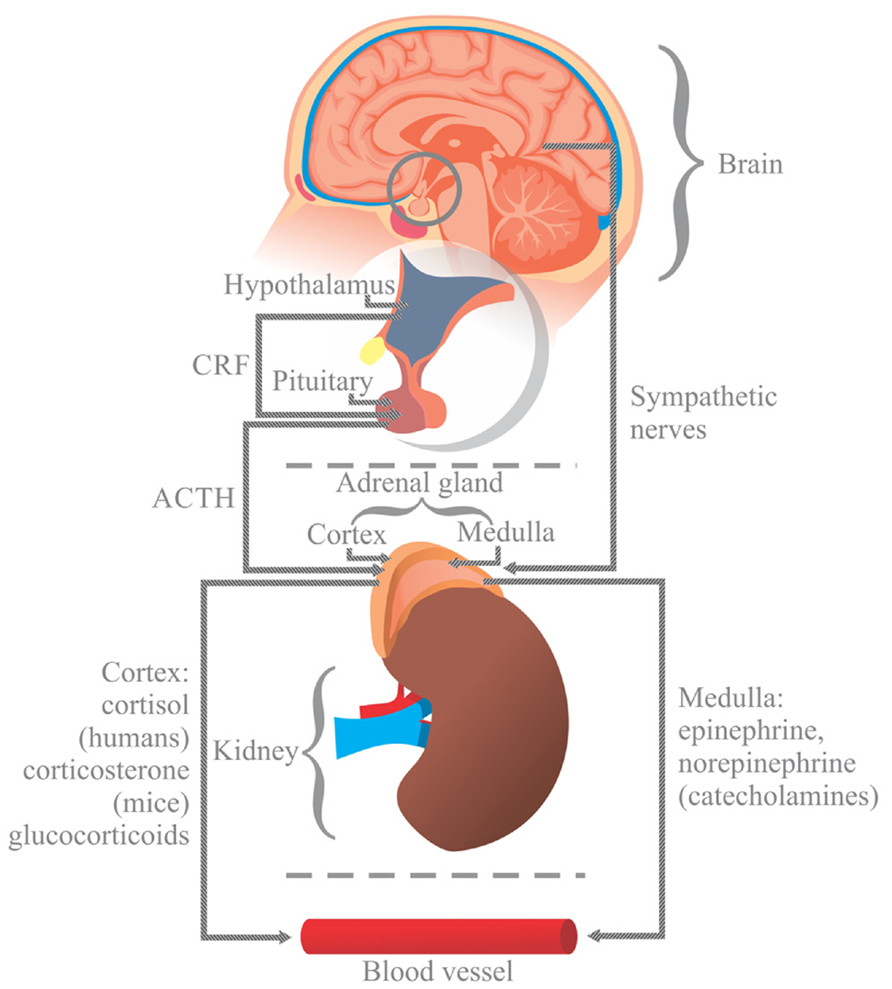
Neurohormonal response to stress

Stress, whether physiological, biological or psychological, is an organism's response to a stressor, such as an environmental condition or change in life circumstances. When stressed by stimuli that alter an organism's environment, multiple systems respond across the body. In humans and most mammals, the autonomic nervous system and hypothalamic-pituitary-adrenal (HPA) axis are the two major systems that respond to stress. Two well-known hormones that humans produce during stressful situations are adrenaline and cortisol.

The sympathoadrenal medullary axis (SAM) may activate the fight-or-flight response through the sympathetic nervous system, which dedicates energy to more relevant bodily systems to acute adaptation to stress, while the parasympathetic nervous system returns the body to homeostasis.

The second major physiological stress-response center, the HPA axis, regulates the release of cortisol, which influences many bodily functions, such as metabolic, psychological and immunological functions. The SAM and HPA axes are regulated by several brain regions, including the limbic system, prefrontal cortex, amygdala, hypothalamus, and stria terminalis. Through these mechanisms, stress can alter memory functions, reward, immune function, metabolism, and susceptibility to diseases.

Disease risk is particularly pertinent to mental illnesses, whereby chronic or severe stress remains a common risk factor for several mental illnesses.

== Psychology ==
Acute stressful situations in which the stress experienced is severe can cause psychological changes to the detriment of the well-being of the individual, such that symptomatic derealization and depersonalization, and anxiety and hyperarousal, are experienced. The International Classification of Diseases includes a group of mental and behavioral disorders which have their aetiology in reaction to severe stress and the consequent adaptive response. Chronic stress, and a lack of coping resources available, or used by an individual, can often lead to the development of psychological issues such as delusions, depression and anxiety.

Chronic stressors may not be as intense as acute stressors such as natural disaster or a major accident, but they persist over longer periods of time and tend to have a more negative effect on health because they are sustained and thus require the body's physiological response to occur daily. This depletes the body's energy more quickly and usually occurs over long periods of time, especially when these microstressors cannot be avoided.

When humans are under chronic stress, permanent changes in their physiological, emotional, and behavioral responses may occur. Chronic stress can include events such as caring for a spouse with dementia, or may result from brief focal events that have long term effects, such as experiencing a sexual assault. Studies have also shown that psychological stress may directly contribute to the disproportionately high rates of coronary heart disease morbidity and mortality and its etiologic risk factors. Specifically, acute and chronic stress have been shown to raise serum lipids and are associated with clinical coronary events.

However, it is possible for individuals to exhibit hardiness—a term referring to the ability to be both chronically stressed and healthy. Even though psychological stress is often connected with illness or disease, most healthy individuals can still remain disease-free after being confronted with chronic stressful events. This suggests that there are individual differences in vulnerability to the potential pathogenic effects of stress; individual differences in vulnerability arise due to both genetic and psychological factors. In addition, the age at which the stress is experienced can dictate its effect on health. Research suggests chronic stress at a young age can have lifelong effects on the biological, psychological, and behavioral responses to stress later in life.

== Etymology and historical usage ==
The term "stress" had none of its contemporary connotations before the 1920s. It is a form of the Middle English destresse, derived via Old French from the Latin stringere, "to draw tight". The word had long been in use in physics to refer to the internal distribution of a force exerted on a material body, resulting in strain. In the 1920s and '30s, biological and psychological circles occasionally used "stress" to refer to a physiological or environmental perturbation that could cause physiological and mental "strain". The amount of strain in reaction to stress depends on the resilience. Excessive strain would appear as illness.

Walter Cannon used it in 1926 to refer to external factors that disrupted what he called homeostasis. But "...stress as an explanation of lived experience is absent from both lay and expert life narratives before the 1930s". Physiological stress represents a wide range of physical responses that occur as a direct effect of a stressor causing an upset in the homeostasis of the body. Upon immediate disruption of either psychological or physical equilibrium the body responds by stimulating the nervous, endocrine, and immune systems. The reaction of these systems causes a number of physical changes that have both short- and long-term effects on the body.

The Holmes and Rahe Stress Scale was developed as a method of assessing the risk of disease from life changes. The scale lists both positive and negative changes that elicit stress. These include things such as a major holiday or marriage, or death of a spouse and firing from a job.

== Biological need for equilibrium ==
Homeostasis is a concept central to the idea of stress. In biology, most biochemical processes strive to maintain equilibrium (homeostasis), a steady state that exists more as an ideal and less as an achievable condition. Environmental factors, internal or external stimuli, continually disrupt homeostasis; an organism's present condition is a state of constant flux moving about a homeostatic point that is that organism's optimal condition for living. Factors causing an organism's condition to diverge too far from homeostasis can be experienced as stress. A life-threatening situation such as a major physical trauma or prolonged starvation can greatly disrupt homeostasis. On the other hand, an organism's attempt at restoring conditions back to or near homeostasis, often consuming energy and natural resources, can also be interpreted as stress.

The ambiguity in defining this phenomenon was first recognized by Hans Selye (1907–1982) in 1926. In 1951 a commentator loosely summarized Selye's view of stress as something that "...in addition to being itself, was also the cause of itself, and the result of itself".

First to use the term in a biological context, Selye continued to define stress as "the non-specific response of the body to any demand placed upon it". Neuroscientists such as Bruce McEwen and Jaap Koolhaas believe that stress, based on years of empirical research, "should be restricted to conditions where an environmental demand exceeds the natural regulatory capacity of an organism". Indeed, in 1995 Toates already defined stress as a "chronic state that arises only when defense mechanisms are either being chronically stretched or are actually failing," while according to Ursin (1988) stress results from an inconsistency between expected events ("set value") and perceived events ("actual value") that cannot be resolved satisfactorily, which also puts stress into the broader context of cognitive-consistency theory.

== Biology of stress ==
Human brain: hypothalamus = amygdala = hippocampus/fornix = pons= pituitary gland=

The brain endocrine interactions are relevant in the translation of stress into physiological and psychological changes. The autonomic nervous system (ANS) plays an important role by translating stress reflexively into a response both to physical stressors and higher level inputs by the brain.

The ANS is composed of the parasympathetic nervous system and sympathetic nervous system, two branches that are both tonically active with opposing activities. The ANS directly innervates tissue through the postganglionic nerves, which is controlled by preganglionic neurons. The ANS receives inputs from the medulla, hypothalamus, limbic system, prefrontal cortex, midbrain and monoamine nuclei.

The activity of the sympathetic nervous system drives what is called the "fight or flight" response. The fight or flight response to emergency or stress involves increased heart rate and forceful contractions, vasoconstriction, bronchodilation, sweating, and secretion of the epinephrine and cortisol from the adrenal medulla, among numerous other physiological and hormonal responses. The parasympathetic nervous response involves return to maintaining homeostasis, and involves miosis, bronchoconstriction, increased activity of the digestive system, and contraction of the bladder walls. Complex relationships between protective and vulnerability factors on the effect of childhood home stress on psychological illness, cardiovascular illness and adaptation have been observed. ANS related mechanisms may increase the risk of cardiovascular disease after major stressful events.

The HPA axis is a neuroendocrine system that mediates a stress response. Neurons in the hypothalamus, particularly the paraventricular nucleus, release vasopressin and corticotropin releasing hormone, which travel through the hypophysial portal vessel where they travel to and bind to the corticotropin-releasing hormone receptor on the anterior pituitary gland. Multiple CRH peptides have been identified, and their corresponding receptors exist in multiple brain regions, including the amygdala. CRH is the main regulatory molecule of the release of ACTH. The secretion of ACTH into the systemic circulation allows it to bind to and activate melanocortin receptors, where it stimulates the release of steroid hormones. The immune system may be influenced by stress. The HPA axis ultimately results in the release of cortisol, which generally has immunosuppressive effects.

Exposure to an acute or chronic uncontrollable stressor impairs the cognitive functions of the prefrontal cortex, e.g. impairing working memory and weakening the top-down control of attention, action and emotion. With an acute stress, there is increased norepinephrine and dopamine release in the prefrontal cortex, which opens potassium channels on dendritic spines to rapidly weaken prefrontal cortical excitatory synapses, a process termed dynamic Network Connectivity. With chronic stress exposure, there is a loss of prefrontal cortical dendrites and spines that correlate with cognitive deficits. Cortisol may exacerbate these actions by blocking catecholamine uptake sites on glia.

=== Plant stress physiology ===
In plants, stress physiology refers to the biochemical, cellular, and physiological responses triggered by adverse environmental conditions such as drought, salinity, temperature extremes, and nutrient deficiency. According to plant physiology research summarized by Kaur and Arora, these stressors disrupt metabolic processes, photosynthesis, and water relations, leading to reduced growth and productivity if adaptive mechanisms are exceeded.

Plants respond to environmental stress through coordinated physiological adjustments, including osmotic regulation, antioxidant defense activation, hormonal signaling, and alterations in gene expression. These responses enable short-term tolerance and longer-term acclimation, although prolonged or severe stress can impair crop yield and ecosystem stability.

== Effects of chronic stress ==
Chronic stress is a term sometimes used to differentiate it from acute stress. Definitions differ, and may be along the lines of continual activation of the stress response, stress that causes an allostatic shift in bodily functions, or just as "prolonged stress". While responses to acute stressors typically do not impose a health burden on young, healthy individuals, chronic stress in older or unhealthy individuals may have long-term effects that are detrimental to health.

=== Infectious ===
Some studies have observed increased risk of upper respiratory tract infection during chronic life stress. In patients with HIV, increased life stress and cortisol was associated with poorer progression of HIV. Also with an increased level of stress, studies have proven evidence that it can reactivate latent herpes viruses.

=== Development ===
Chronic stress has also been shown to impair developmental growth in children by lowering the pituitary gland's production of growth hormone, as in children associated with a home environment involving serious marital discord, alcoholism, or child abuse. More generally, prenatal life, infancy, childhood, and adolescence are critical periods in which the vulnerability to stressors is particularly high.

=== Psychopathology ===
A 2024 review reported that the global estimated lifetime prevalence of post-traumatic stress disorder (PTSD) in adults is approximately 3.9%. Stress may contribute to various disorders, such as fibromyalgia, chronic fatigue syndrome, depression, as well as functional somatic syndromes.

== Psychological concepts ==
=== Eustress ===
Stressors that are enjoyable or inspiring are termed eustress, which has generally positive effects on energy, cardiovascular health, and cognitive functions.

In 1975, Selye published a model dividing stress into eustress and distress. Where stress enhances function (physical or mental, such as through strength training or challenging work), it may be considered eustress. Persistent stress that is not resolved through coping or adaptation, deemed distress, may lead to anxiety or withdrawal (depression) behavior.

The difference between experiences that result in eustress and those that result in distress is determined by the disparity between an experience (real or imagined) and personal expectations, and resources to cope with the stress.

=== Cognitive appraisal ===
Lazarus argued that, in order for a psychosocial situation to be stressful, it must be appraised as such. He argued that cognitive processes of appraisal are central in determining whether a situation is potentially threatening, constitutes a harm/loss or a challenge, or is benign.

Both personal and environmental factors influence this primary appraisal, which then triggers the selection of coping processes. Problem-focused coping is directed at managing the problem, whereas emotion-focused coping processes are directed at managing the negative emotions. Secondary appraisal refers to the evaluation of the resources available to cope with the problem, and may alter the primary appraisal.

In other words, primary appraisal includes the perception of how stressful the problem is and the secondary appraisal of estimating whether one has more than or less than adequate resources to deal with the problem that affects the overall appraisal of stressfulness. Further, coping is flexible in that, in general, the individual examines the effectiveness of the coping on the situation; if it is not having the desired effect, they will, in general, try different strategies.

== Assessment ==
=== Health risk factors ===
Both negative and positive stressors can lead to stress. The intensity and duration of stress change depending on the circumstances and emotional condition of the person with it (Arnold. E and Boggs. K. 2007). Some common categories and examples of stressors include:

- Sensory input such as pain, bright light, noise, temperatures, or environmental issues such as a lack of control over environmental circumstances, such as food, air and/or water quality, housing, health, freedom, or mobility.
- Social issues can also cause stress, such as struggles with difficult individuals and social defeat, or relationship conflict, deception, or break ups, and major events such as birth and deaths, marriage, and divorce.
- Life experiences such as poverty, unemployment, clinical depression, obsessive compulsive disorder, heavy drinking, or insufficient sleep can also cause stress. Students and workers may face performance pressure stress from exams and project deadlines.
- Adverse experiences during development (e.g. prenatal exposure to maternal stress, poor attachment histories, sexual abuse) are thought to contribute to deficits in the maturity of an individual's stress response systems. One evaluation of the different stresses in people's lives is the Holmes and Rahe Stress Scale.

=== General adaptation syndrome ===
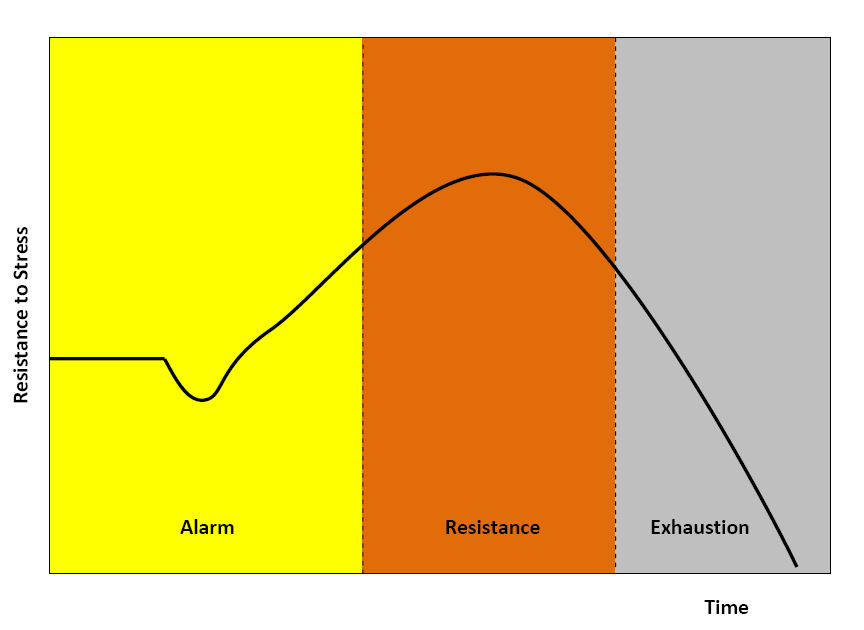
A diagram of the general adaptation syndrome model

Physiologists define stress as how the body reacts to a stressor – a stimulus, real or imagined. Acute stressors affect an organism in the short term; chronic stressors over the longer term. The general adaptation syndrome (GAS), developed by Hans Selye, is a profile of how organisms respond to stress; GAS is characterized by three phases: a nonspecific alarm mobilization phase, which promotes sympathetic nervous system activity; a resistance phase, during which the organism makes efforts to cope with the threat; and an exhaustion phase, which occurs if the organism fails to overcome the threat and depletes its physiological resources.

==== Stage 1 ====
Alarm is the first stage, which is divided into two phases: the shock phase and the antishock phase.

- Shock phase: During this phase, the body can endure changes such as hypovolemia, hypoosmolarity, hyponatremia, hypochloremia, hypoglycemia—the stressor effect. This phase resembles Addison's disease. The organism's resistance to the stressor drops temporarily below the normal range and some level of shock (e.g. circulatory shock) may be experienced.
- Antishock phase: When the threat or stressor is identified or realized, the body starts to respond and is in a state of alarm. During this stage, the locus coeruleus and sympathetic nervous system activate the production of catecholamines including adrenaline, engaging the popularly-known fight-or-flight response. Adrenaline temporarily provides increased muscular tonus, increased blood pressure due to peripheral vasoconstriction and tachycardia, and increased glucose in blood. There is also some activation of the HPA axis, producing glucocorticoids (cortisol, aka the S-hormone or stress-hormone).

==== Stage 2 ====
Resistance is the second stage. During this stage, increased secretion of glucocorticoids intensifies the body's systemic response. Glucocorticoids can increase the concentration of glucose, fat, and amino acid in blood. In high doses, one glucocorticoid, cortisol, begins to act similarly to a mineralocorticoid (aldosterone) and brings the body to a state similar to hyperaldosteronism. If the stressor persists, it becomes necessary to attempt some means of coping with the stress. The body attempts to respond to stressful stimuli, but after prolonged activation, the body's chemical resources will be gradually depleted, leading to the final stage.

== History in research ==
The current usage of the word stress arose out of Hans Selye's 1930s experiments. He started to use the term to refer not just to the agent but to the state of the organism as it responded and adapted to the environment. His theories of a universal non-specific stress response attracted great interest and contention in academic physiology and he undertook extensive research programs and publication efforts.

While the work attracted continued support from advocates of psychosomatic medicine, many in experimental physiology concluded that his concepts were too vague and unmeasurable. During the 1950s, Selye turned away from the laboratory to promote his concept through popular books and lecture tours. He wrote for both non-academic physicians and, in an international bestseller entitled Stress of Life, for the general public.

A broad biopsychosocial concept of stress and adaptation offered the promise of helping everyone achieve health and happiness by successfully responding to changing global challenges and the problems of modern civilization. Selye coined the term "eustress" for positive stress, by contrast to distress. He argued that all people have a natural urge and need to work for their own benefit, a message that found favor with industrialists and governments. He also coined the term stressor to refer to the causative event or stimulus, as opposed to the resulting state of stress.

Selye was in contact with the tobacco industry from 1958 and they were undeclared allies in litigation and the promotion of the concept of stress, clouding the link between smoking and cancer, and portraying smoking as a "diversion", or in Selye's concept a "deviation", from environmental stress.

From the late 1960s, academic psychologists started to adopt Selye's concept; they sought to quantify "life stress" by scoring "significant life events", and a large amount of research was undertaken to examine links between stress and disease of all kinds. By the late 1970s, stress had become the medical area of greatest concern to the general population, and more basic research was called for to better address the issue. There was also renewed laboratory research into the neuroendocrine, molecular, and immunological bases of stress, conceived as a useful heuristic not necessarily tied to Selye's original hypotheses. The US military became a key center of stress research, attempting to understand and reduce combat neurosis and psychiatric casualties.

The psychiatric diagnosis post-traumatic stress disorder (PTSD) was coined in the mid-1970s, in part through the efforts of anti-Vietnam War activists and the Vietnam Veterans Against the War, and Chaim F. Shatan. The condition was added to the Diagnostic and Statistical Manual of Mental Disorders as posttraumatic stress disorder in 1980. PTSD was considered a severe and ongoing emotional reaction to an extreme psychological trauma, and as such often associated with soldiers, police officers, and other emergency personnel. The stressor may involve threat to life (or viewing the actual death of someone else), serious physical injury, or threat to physical or psychological integrity. In some cases, it can also be from profound psychological and emotional trauma, apart from any actual physical harm or threat. Often, however, the two are combined.

By the 1990s, "stress" had become an integral part of modern scientific understanding in all areas of physiology and human functioning, and one of the great metaphors of Western life. Focus grew on stress in certain settings, such as workplace stress, and stress management techniques were developed. The term also became a euphemism, a way of referring to problems and eliciting sympathy without being explicitly confessional, just "stressed out". It came to cover a huge range of phenomena from mild irritation to the kind of severe problems that might result in a real breakdown of health. In popular usage, almost any event or situation between these extremes could be described as stressful.

The American Psychological Association's 2015 Stress In America Study found that nationwide stress is on the rise and that the three leading sources of stress were "money", "family responsibility", and "work".

== See also ==
- Autonomic nervous system
- Defense physiology
- HPA axis
- Inflammation
- Plant stress measurement
- Trier social stress test
- Xenohormesis
- Stress in early childhood
- Weathering hypothesis
- Endorphins
