= J. Selye University =

Hungarian-language public university in Slovakia

- Selye János Egyetem (Hungarian); Univerzita J. Selyeho (Slovak)
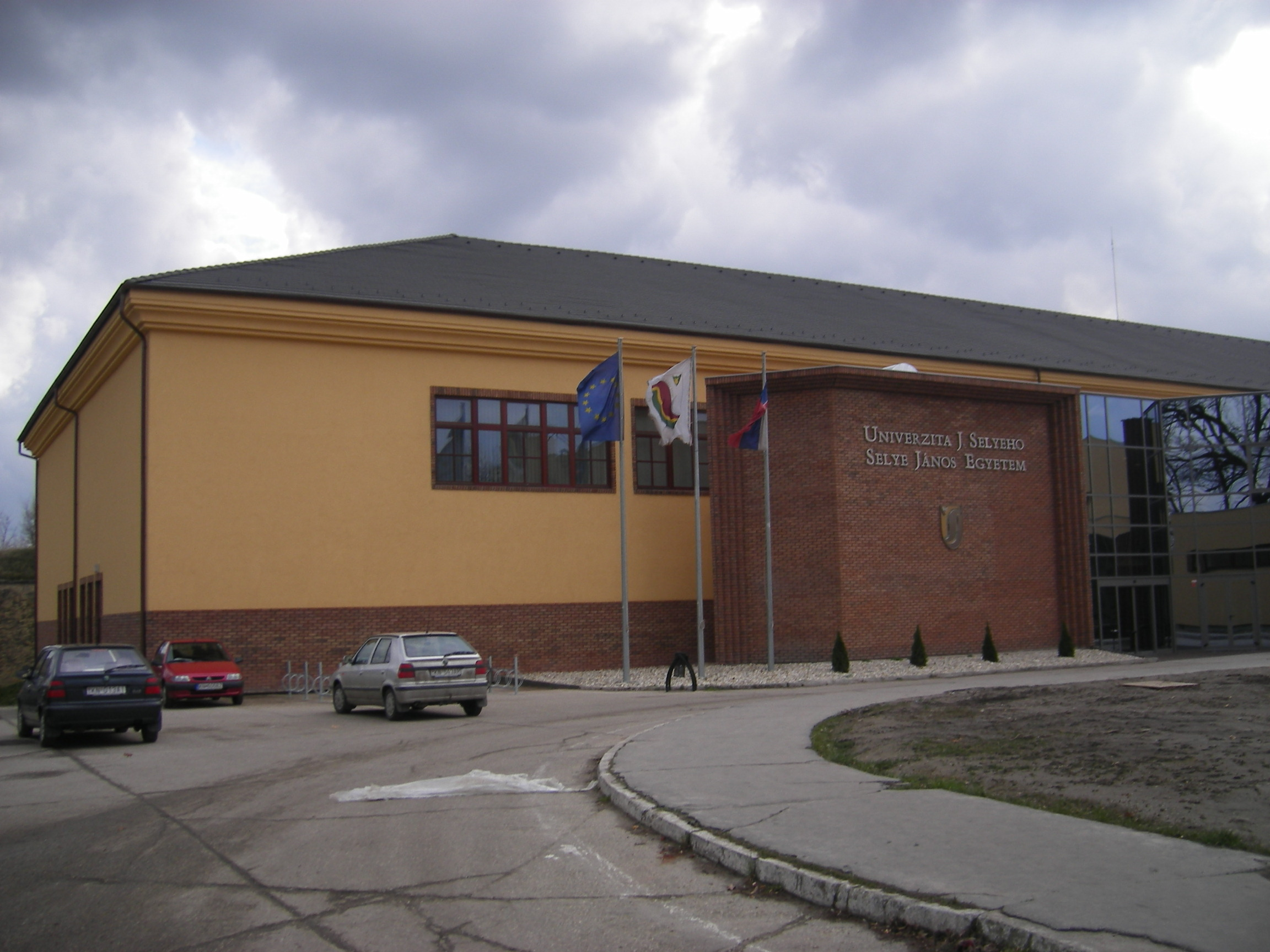
- The new building of J. Selye University, 2006
- Type: Public
- Established: 2004
- Affiliations: ERASMUS
- Rector: György Juhász
- Students: cca. 2000
- Location: Bratislavská cesta 3322, 945 01 Komárno, Slovakia, Komárom / Komárno, Slovakia; 47°45′22″N 18°07′47″E
- Nickname: UJS
- Website: www.ujs.sk

J. Selye University (Hungarian: Selye János Egyetem, Slovak: Univerzita J. Selyeho) is the only Hungarian-language university in Slovakia. It was established in 2004 in Komárno (Hungarian: (Rév)Komárom) and it has three faculties. It is named after Hans Selye (Hungarian: Selye János), a 20th-century Hungarian endocrinologist (see: Education in Slovakia). The number of students attending the university has increased from 1731 in 2015 to 1894 in 2020.

== Faculties ==
- Faculty of Economics and Informatics
- Faculty of Education
- Faculty of Theology

== Gallery ==
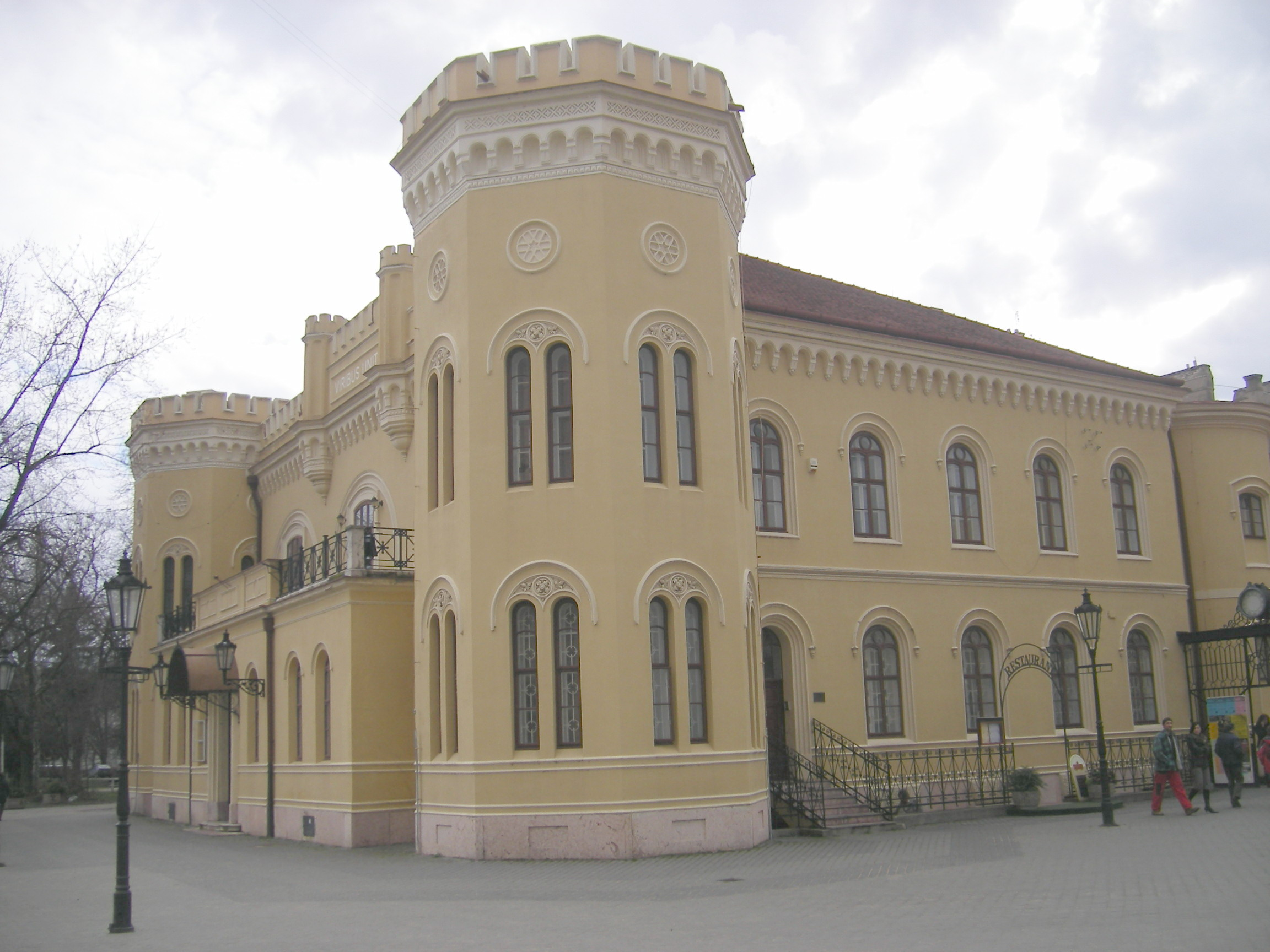
J. Selye University

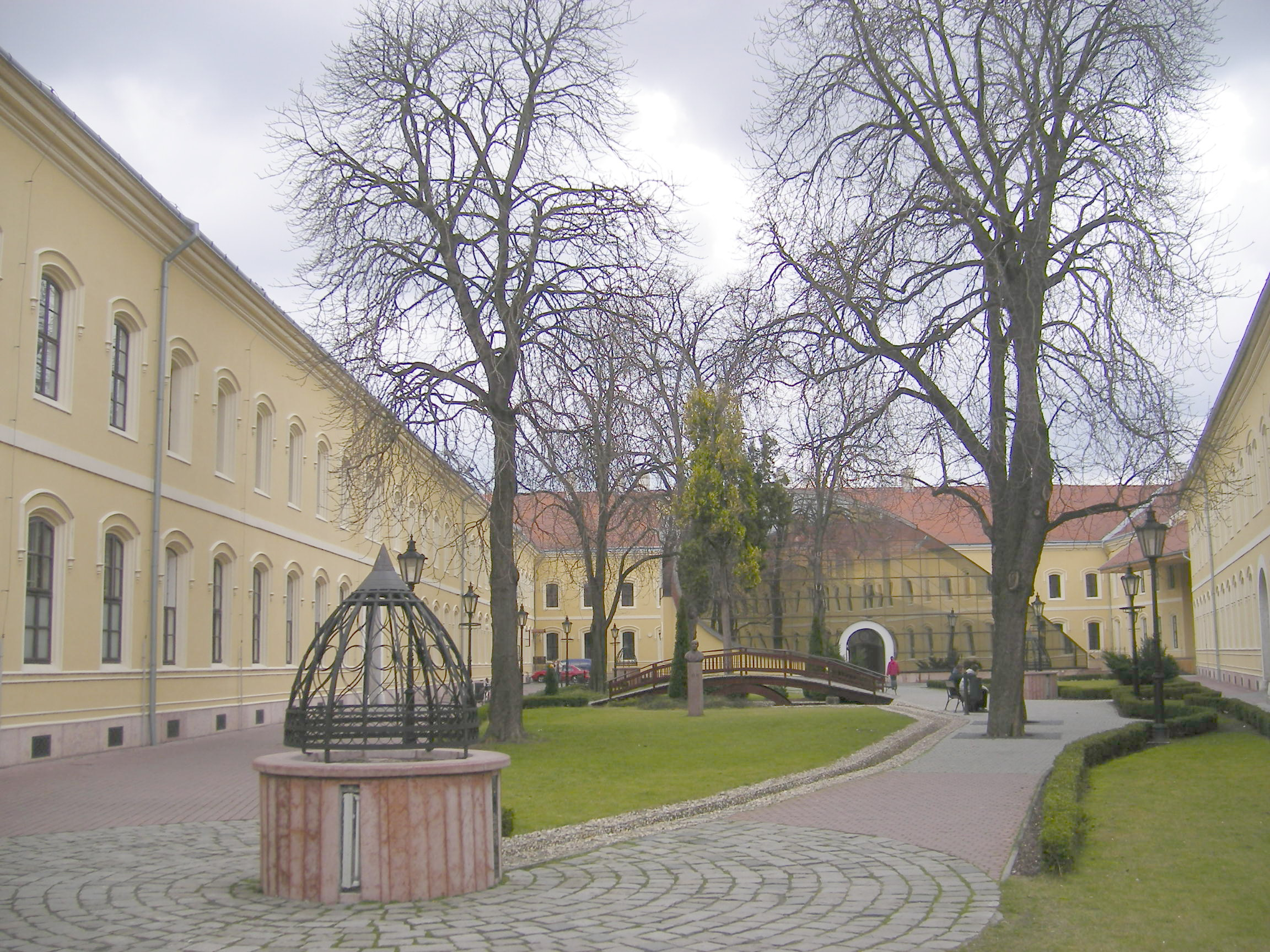
J. Selye University

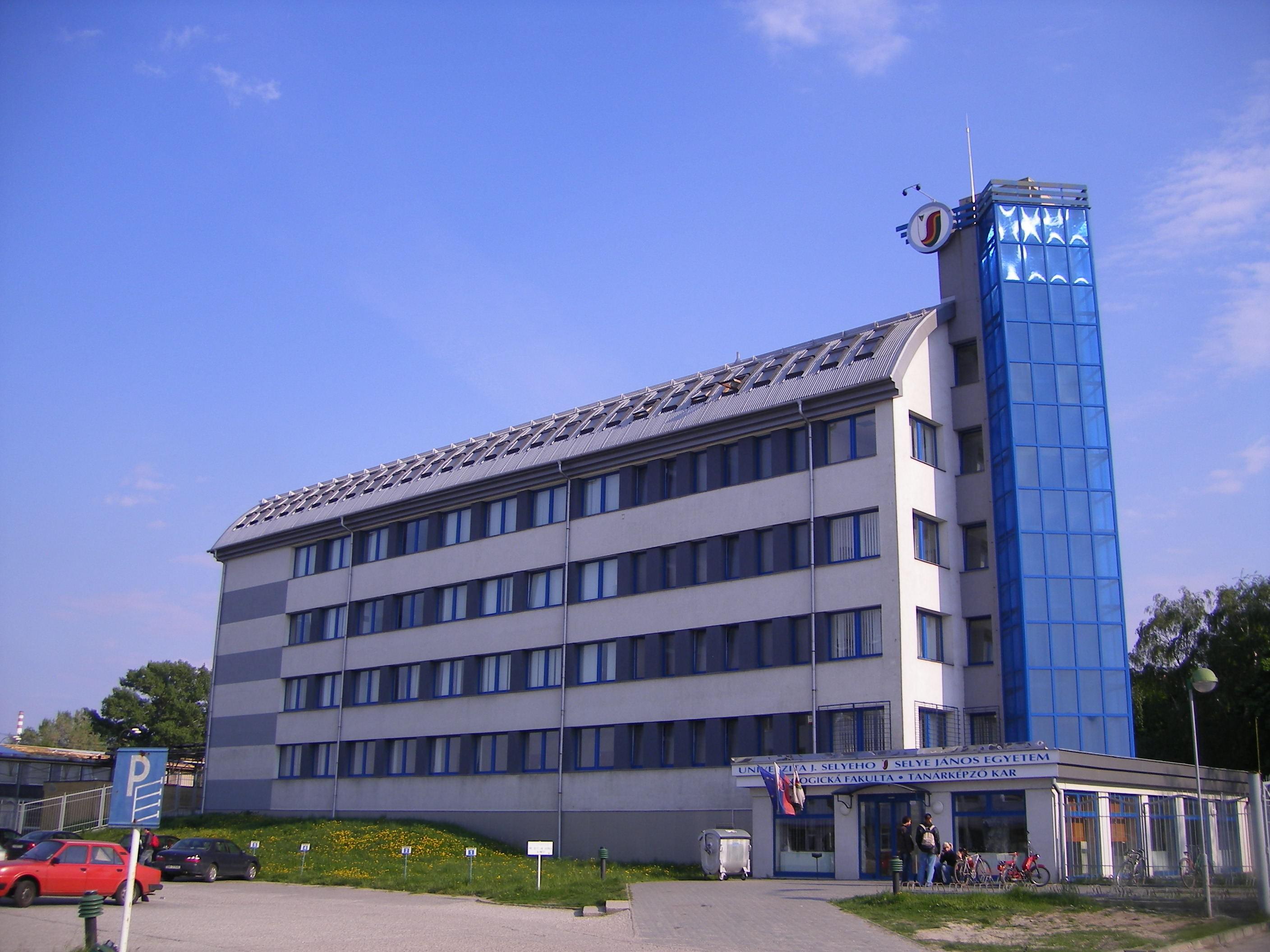
Faculty of Pedagogy

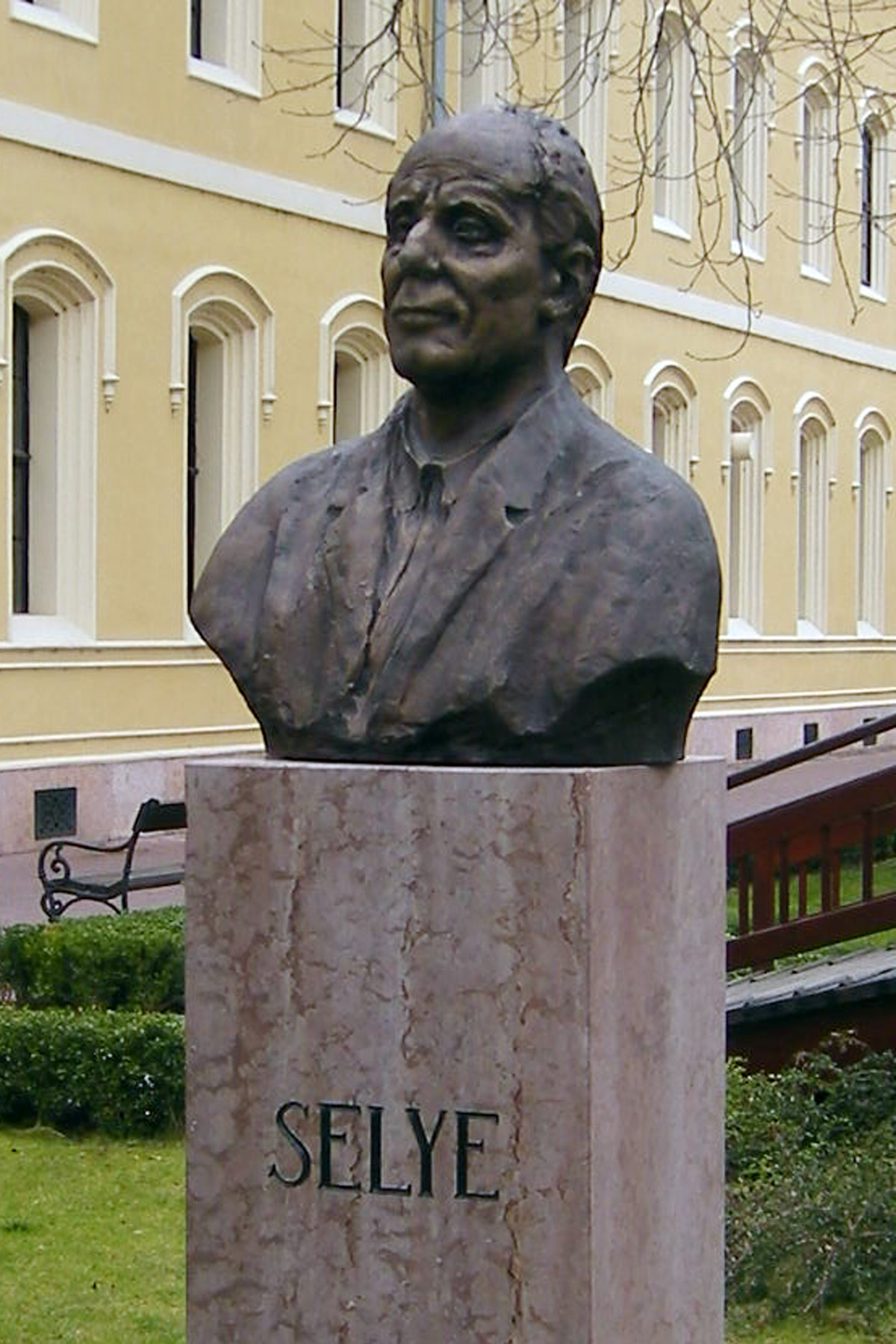
Bust of Hans Selye
