= Distress (medicine) =

Aversive state

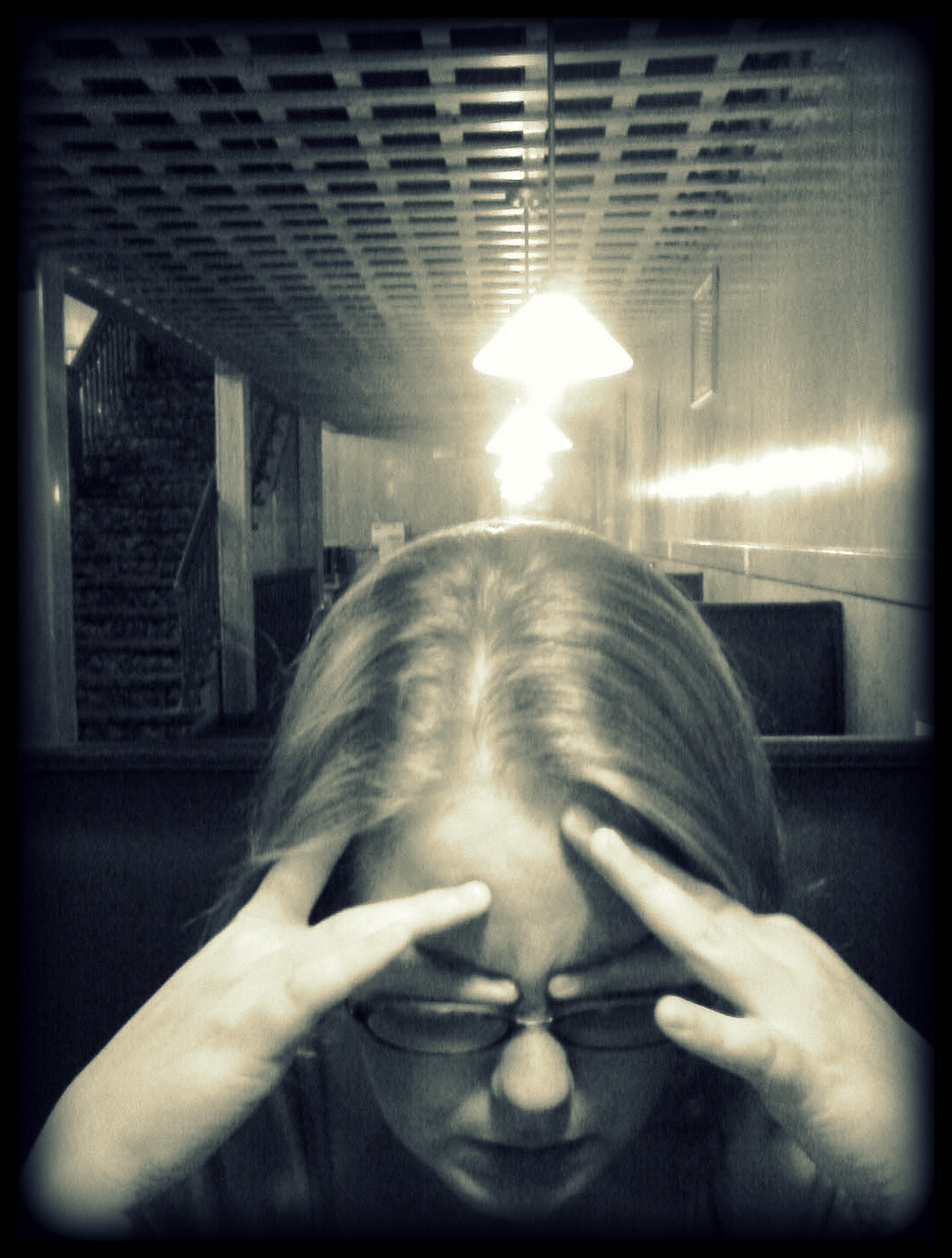
Woman portraying the condition of distress

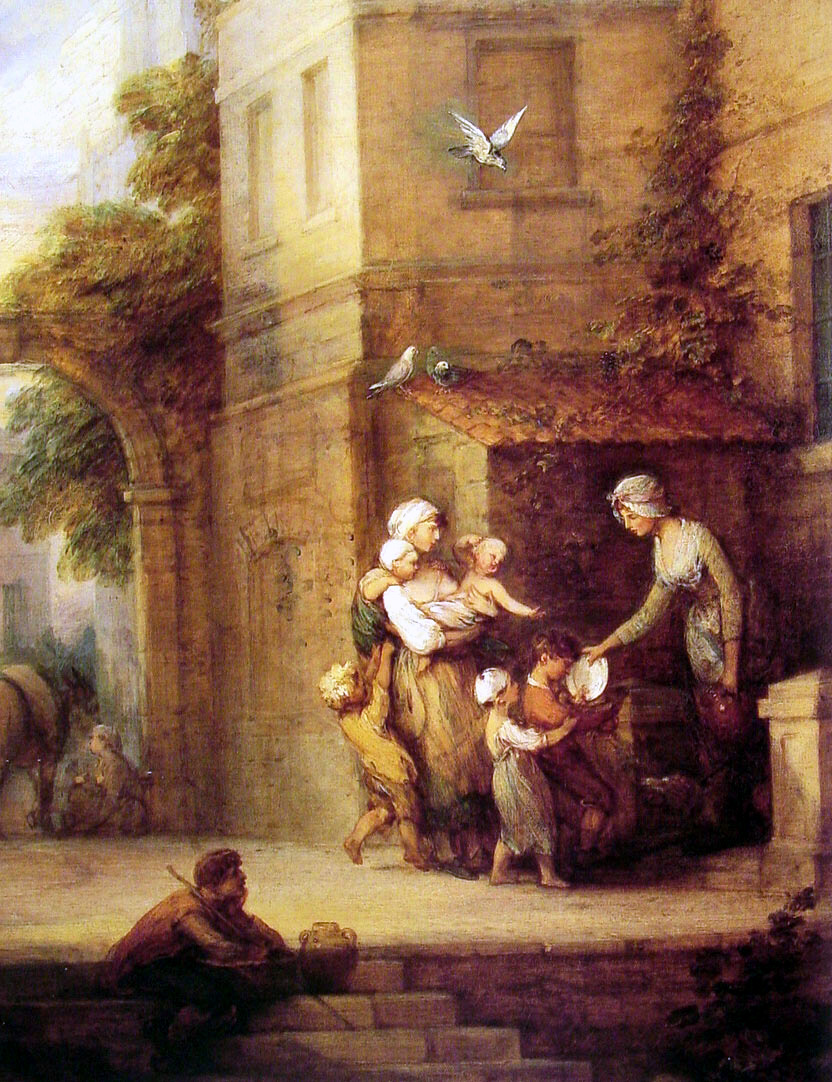
Charity relieving stress of an overloaded mother.

In medicine, distress is an aversive state in which a person is unable to completely adapt to difficult situations and their resulting effects and shows maladaptive behaviors. It can be evident in the presence of various phenomena, such as inappropriate social interaction (e.g., aggression, passivity, or withdrawal).

Distress is the opposite of eustress, a positive emotion that motivates people.

== Risk factors ==
Stress can be created by influences such as work, school, peers or co-workers, family and death. Other influences vary by age.

People under constant distress are more likely to become sick, mentally or physically. There is a clear response association between psychological distress and major causes of mortality across the full range of distress.

Higher education has been linked to a reduction in psychological distress in both men and women, and these effects persist throughout the aging process, not just immediately after receiving education. However, this link does lessen with age. The major mechanism by which higher education plays a role on reducing stress in men is more so related to labor-market resources rather than social resources as in women.

In the clinic, distress is a patient reported outcome that has a huge impact on patient's quality of life. To assess patient distress, a Hospital Anxiety and Depression Scale (HADS) questionnaire is most commonly used. The score from the HADS questionnaire guides a clinician to recommend lifestyle modifications or further assessment for mental disorders like depression.

== Management ==
People often find ways of dealing with distress, in both negative and positive ways. Examples of positive ways are listening to music, calming exercises, coloring, sports and similar healthy distractions. Negative ways can include but are not limited to use of drugs including alcohol, and expression of anger, which are likely to lead to complicated social interactions, thus causing increased distress.

== See also ==
- Mental distress
- Intentional infliction of emotional distress
