= Determination =

Positive emotional feeling

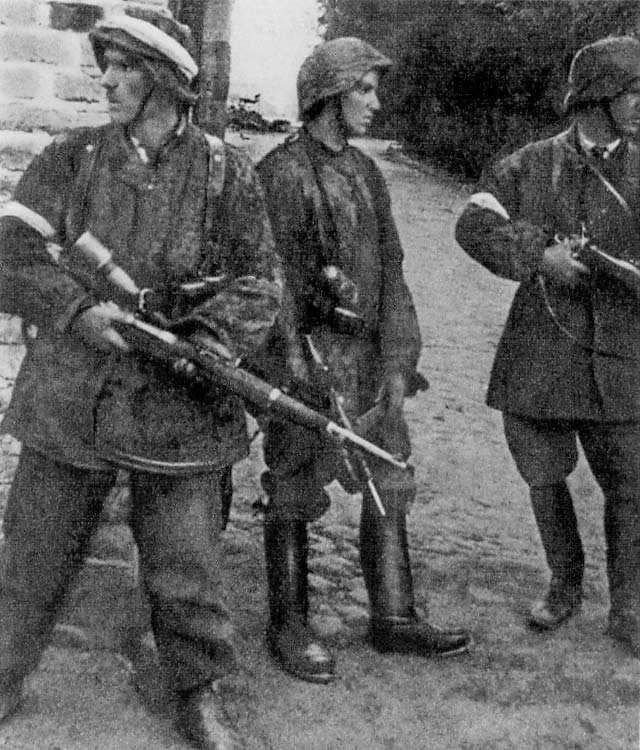
Remarking on the anti-Nazi resistance movement fighting during the Warsaw Uprising, Polish President Andrzej Duda has stated that "thanks to its... determination, Poland exists".

Determination is a positive emotional feeling that promotes persevering towards a difficult goal in spite of obstacles. Determination occurs prior to goal attainment and serves to motivate behavior that will help achieve one's goal. Motivation encourages determination and pushes the person forwards so they can face their problem. Determination also helps people be brave.

Empirical research suggests that people consider determination to be an emotion; in other words, determination is not just a cognitive state, but an affective state. In the psychology literature, researchers study determination under other terms, including challenge and anticipatory enthusiasm; this may explain one reason for the relative lack of research on determination compared to other positive emotions.

In the field of psychology, emotion research focuses on negative emotions and the behaviors they prompt. However, positive psychology delves into determination as a positive emotion driving people toward action, leading to significant results like persistence and success.

== Etymology ==
The word determination comes from the Latin word dēterminatiō, meaning "limit" or "determination, end result". It is derived from the verb dētermināre, meaning "confine; designate," with the abstract noun suffix -tiō. The meaning shifted from "end result, decision" to its present meaning.

== Major theories ==
=== Self-determination theory ===
Self-determination theory (SDT) is a theory of motivation and dedication towards an ambition. It focuses on the interplay between personalities and experiences in social contexts that results in motivations of both autonomous and controlled types. An example of autonomous motivation would be doing something because of intrinsic motivation, or because there is an internal desire to accomplish something. An example of controlled motivation would be doing something because there is outside pressure to accomplish a goal.

Social environments seem to have a profound effect on both intrinsic and extrinsic motivation and self-regulation. Self-determination theory proposes that social and cultural factors influence a person's sense of volition and initiative in regards to goals, performance, and well-being. High levels of determination and volition are supported by conditions that foster autonomy (e.g., a person has multiple options), competence (e.g., positive feedback) and relatedness (e.g., stable connection to the group a person is working within).

=== Biopsychosocial model ===
Emotions researchers search for physiological patterns associated with particular positive emotions. However, the blending of emotions makes drawing such distinctions difficult. In relation to challenge and determination, psychologists focus on physiological activation in relation to the individual's intended actions (what he/she is determined to do) rather than how the individual subjectively feels.

Researchers associate effort (action tendency) with challenge and determination. So a challenged/determined individual should experience physiological arousal that reflects effort. By focusing on the sympathetic nervous system, researchers can measure systolic blood pressure (SBP) as a proxy for increased effort. People who are introduced to a challenging task experience an increase in SBP when they become determined to complete that task. This is coupled with lowered total peripheral resistance (while the heart is pumping faster, the vasculature is relaxed). This demonstrates an important difference between the physiological reaction of a person motivated by challenge and one motivated by threat or fear.

There seems to be a specific physiological pattern associated with determination. The identification of this pattern is valuable as it can be used in research aimed at eliciting and studying the antecedents and consequences of this common positive emotion.

=== Appraisal theory ===
Appraisal theory posits that determination is evoked by three cognitive motivation-appraisal components—evaluations of how the environment and situational circumstances interact with aspects of the individual to create meaning and influence emotional experience:

motivational relevance
whether a situation is relevant to a person's commitments and goals
motivational incongruence
whether a situation is incongruent with a person's commitments and goals
high problem-focused coping potential
whether a situation is one that a person can deal with by using active coping strategies such as planning and problem-solving

These appraisal components combine to evoke experiences of determination that then motivate one to persevere and strive towards mastery. Appraisal theory proposes that determination is associated with effortful optimism, referring to the belief that a situation can be improved upon with enough effort from the person.

== Empirical findings ==
=== Emotional experience ===
Research showed that electrical brain stimulation to the anterior midcingulate cortex elicits a response that mirrors the emotional experience of determination. In this study of two epileptic seizure patients, they reported feeling determined to overcome an approaching challenge; this emotion was reported to feel pleasant. Following electrical stimulation, participants exhibited elevated cardiovascular activity and reported a warm feeling in their upper chest and neck. This work supports the idea that determination is a positive emotion that prepares an individual to overcome obstacles.

Another study compared determination and pride to see how these two positive emotions differentially influenced perseverance in the context of a mathematical problem-solving task. Using a directed imagery task in which participants listened to and imagined a particular scenario, each emotion was differentially induced in participants. The results suggested that determination enhanced task engagement and perseverance, with participants in the determination group spending significantly more time on the most difficult problem in the task. In contrast, pride decreased task engagement and perseverance relative to a neutral condition, with participants in the pride group spending significantly less time on the most difficult problem in the task. This research further supports the notion that determination motivates perseverance, perhaps more so than other positive emotions that have been theorized to be associated with perseverance.

=== Emotional expression ===
Experiences of determination are linked to a recognizable facial expression that involves frowning of the eyebrows, an expression that is perceptually similar to anger. This eyebrow frown is associated with the perception of goal obstacles, supporting the notion that determination is associated with the action tendency of preparing to overcome difficult obstacles in goal pursuit.

=== Intrinsic and extrinsic motivation ===
Internal motivation is an internal drive, curiosity, or desire to learn that is within human beings. It drives people to learn new things or to put things into action. Intrinsic motivation is often evident when people desire to try new things or find ways to overcome challenges. Intrinsic motivation is often what drives a person to start something, but extrinsic motivation is often what helps people to accomplish their goals. Extrinsic motivation is the external drive that motivates action. It can include things like going to work daily to pay one's bills, or obeying the law to stay out of trouble. This type of motivation is not driven by one's own desires but instead by outside sources.

== Applications ==
=== Classroom, workplace, and family environment ===
Determination is believed to be shaped by the emotion of challenge and societal expectations. Environments like education, work, and family that promote encouragement play a role in fostering determination. When individuals have access to resources and supportive peers who believe in their capabilities, they tend to experience heightened determination, leading to improved performance and well-being.

Research shows that students enrolled in learning environments in which teachers incorporate strategies meant to meet students' motivational needs (e.g., encouragement aimed at intrinsic rewards, using student-directed forms of discipline) are more likely to become responsible learners who display a determination to succeed.

William Zinsser studied the pressures faced by college students at Yale, such as the need to develop time management and study skills appropriate for college and university work, the desire for good grades, the desire to meet parents' expectations, and the need to find employment in a competitive job market after graduation.

=== Health and well-being ===
Studies have linked challenge and determination to increases in physical health and mental well-being. Some specific positive outcomes include illness resistance, increased survival rates, and decreased levels of depression. A person experiences positive personal growth when that person can proactively cope with a difficult situation. In such a case, a person can acknowledge a demanding situation, take action, and maintain high coping potential. They can acknowledge the benefits of a difficult experience and display a willingness to put forth an effort and achieve specific personal goals.

=== Interpersonal relationships ===
In interpersonal interactions, adopting challenge appraisals is crucial for effectively managing conflicts. For example, young children facing bullying often seek support and report the incidents. When a bullied child employs a challenge appraisal, they view bullying as a chance to rely on others and find positive solutions. This approach maintains their autonomy, as they act independently to involve others. Challenge and determination facilitate goal achievement and are related to increased confidence and decreased evaluation apprehension. Therefore, determined individuals who use challenge appraisals feel capable of handling tough situations while being open to seeking assistance when necessary.

== See also ==
- Assertiveness – Capacity of being self-assured without being aggressive to defend a point of view
- Conflict (process) – Friction, disagreement, or discord between people
- Defense physiology – Changes in body functions with stress
- Empowerment – Autonomy and self-determination in people and communities
- Endurance – Ability of an organism to exert itself and remain active for a long period of time
- Grit (personality trait) – Psychological concept
- Hardiness (psychology) – Ability to endure stress without negative health effects
- Mental toughness – Measure of perseverance through difficult challenges
- Motivation – Inner state causing goal-directed behavior
- Need for achievement – Person's desire for significant accomplishment
- Patience – Ability to endure difficult circumstances
- Persistence (psychology) – Personality trait in psychology
- Positive psychology – Approach of psychological scientific study
- Psychological resilience – Ability to mentally cope with a crisis
- Sisu – Finnish concept
- Social dominance theory – Theory of intergroup relations
- Volition (psychology) – Cognitive process of decision to act
- Will (philosophy) – Faculty that selects among a being's desires
- Zest (positive psychology) – One's thirst and excitement for living
