= Jacob Lomranz =

Israeli professor of psychological sciences (1937–2021)

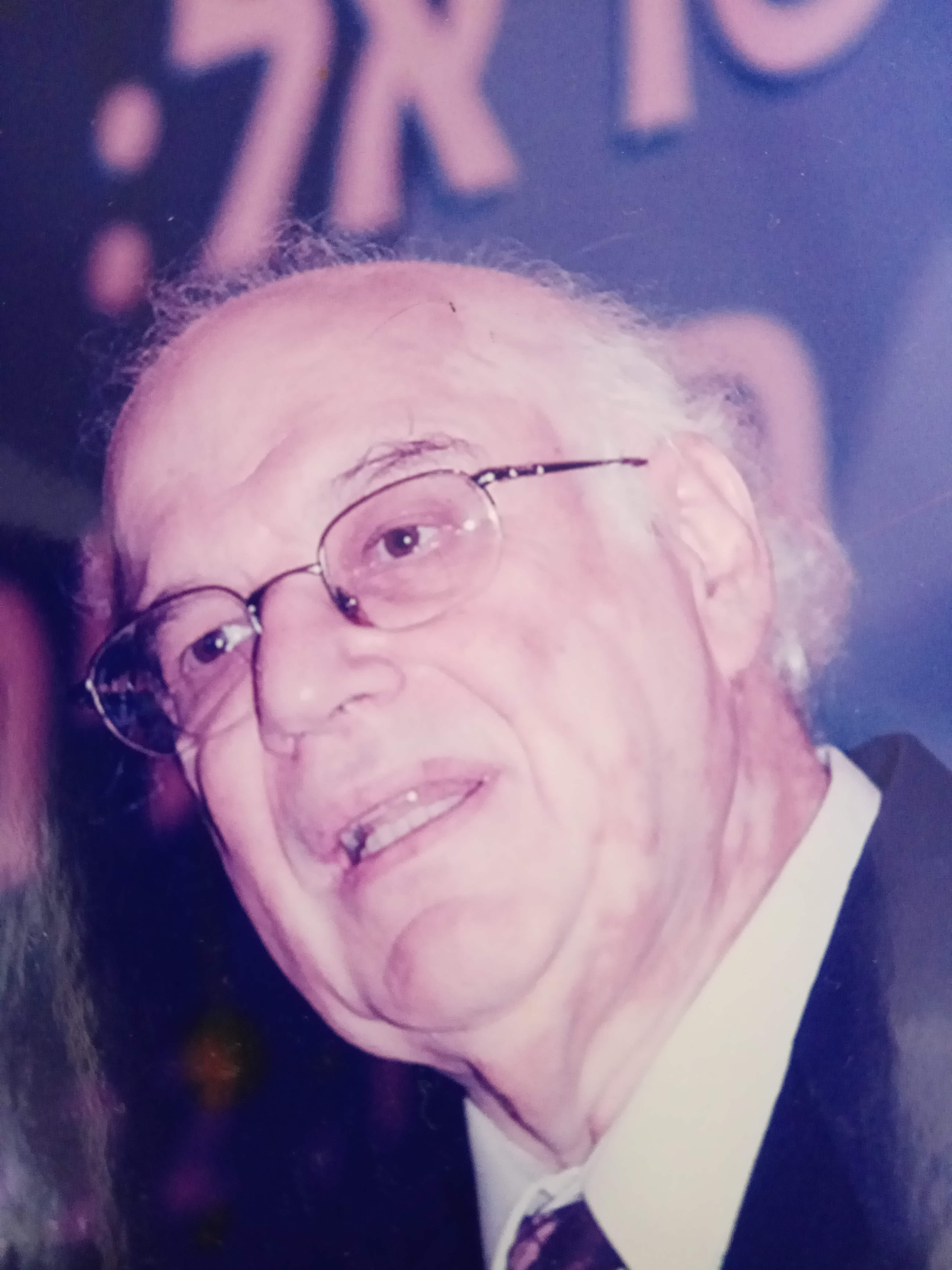

Jacob "Jacky" Lomranz (Hebrew: יעקב לומרנץ; 10 January 1937 – 13 June 2021) was an Israeli professor emeritus at the School of Psychological Sciences at Tel Aviv University, Israel. He was a former head of the not M.A. program for clinical-gerontological psychology at the Ruppin Academic Center.

== Biography ==
Jacob Lomranz was born in Leipzig, Germany. Lomranz's family fled the country in 1939 under the growing threat of Nazism. The family lived in Japanese-controlled Shanghai until February 1949, when they emigrated to Israel.

Lomranz received his B.A. in psychology and philosophy from Tel Aviv University in 1965, and then went on to earn his Ph.D. in clinical psychology at Duke University in 1971. He spent most of his professional career at Tel Aviv University, where he eventually became a professor and developed the curriculum for the study of adulthood and aging.

Lomranz has devoted most of his academic life to gerontology, particularly from the psychological-clinical aspect. He established the unit for the psychology of adulthood and aging at Tel Aviv University, which eventually became the Herczeg Institute on Aging.

He also established the special M.A. program for clinical-gerontological psychology at the Ruppin Academic Center, which focuses on therapy for the mature and elderly.

During the years 2000-2004, he served as head of the Israel Gerontological Society.

He is presently the head of the Frenkel Research Fund for Research on Holocaust Survivors at the Tel-Aviv University and a board member of Amacha - National Israeli Center for Psychological Support of Survivors of the Holocaust and the Second Generation. He is the Program Director of Creative Aging in Eshel: The Association for the Planning and Development Services for the Aged in Israel.

Outside his academic life, Lomranz is an art collector and enthusiast. He learned to play piano and paint at a relatively advanced age and has exhibited his own work in Jaffa.

Lomranz died on 13 June 2021, at the age of 84.

== Research ==
Lomranz has developed a gerontological-humanistic approach, devoted to those who are coping with mental distress or existential crises. At the root of his research are the principles of developmental psychology. His studies focus on various topics related to psychological space and time, mental health in old age, the mental adjustment of Holocaust survivors, and conditions of stress and trauma on the personal, social and national levels.

He has been particularly interested in the psychological meanings individuals give the physical-objective dimensions of space, shedding light on the differences in the way people establish their psychological worlds.

=== Personality theories ===
Lomranz developed a teaching model for personality theories based on an evaluation of the field. He addressed the problems the professional psychologist faces when teaching the graduate clinical student, in order to derive a rationale for interdisciplinary and basic categories and dimensions serving as guidelines to the comprehension, examination, and teaching of personality theories. The teaching method integrates intellectual and experiential involvement.

=== The concept of Aintegration ===
The development of the theory of Aintegreation (meaning lack of integration) is a central focus of Lomranz's research in the field of psychology, focusing on the dialectics of life with unresolved conflicts. Lomranz adopted a paradigm of contrast, relativity and paradox, as opposed to the traditional logic, continuity, unity and harmony. He concluded that the secret of adjustment, creativity and development, stems from human capability – found in the cognitive, emotional and positional levels – to tolerate a dialectic life where vagueness, lack of continuity, lack of synchronization and ambivalence rule.

He studied people who had been through existential changes, such as loss, wars an old age, and indicated the need for the tolerance of problems in life which couldn't be resolved. He has stated that it was this aintegration that allowed the individual to achieve more personal insights, realistic interpretations, conduct in situations of uncertainty, effective risk-taking, and ultimately, acceptance and serenity. This theory may be applied to the study of personality and psychotherapeutic care.

=== Mental health in old age ===
Lomranz was an Israeli pioneer in the implementation of clinical psychology for the aged population. He mapped the difficulties and special needs of mental health in old age, examined the psychological tools for determining mental health disorders, and characterized the various models of psychotherapy and mental care. He has shown how classical and post-Freudian theories could benefit aging people and how they could be utilized.

=== Mental adjustment of Holocaust survivors ===
Lomranz was among those who examined the long-term effects of Holocaust trauma, and he has held dozens of seminars about the research in the field. In a 1995 article, he demonstrated the effect of the research methodology on the characterization of the survivors' mental state, emphasizing the importance of studies of survivors sampled from the community (not in a clinical setting), for understanding how despite their vulnerability, most were able to display impressive coping capabilities. He has expressed a belief that over-emphasis of survivors' psychopathological reactions creates a distorted image of them, reducing their mental strength.

== Books ==
- Lomranz, J., Naveh, G. (Eds.) (1994) Trauma and old age: Coping with the stress of the Gulf War. Jerusalem, JDC-Brookdale Institute of Gerontology (Hebrew).
- Mostofsky, D & Lomranz, J. (Eds.) (1997). Handbook of Pain and Aging. New York: Plenum Publishing Corporation.
- Lomranz. J. (Ed.) (1998). Handbook of Aging and Mental Health: An Integrative Approach. New York: Plenum Publishing Corporation.

== See also ==
- List of Israelis
