= Mullingstorp =

Psychotherapy institute in Sweden

Mullingstorp Kursgård AB
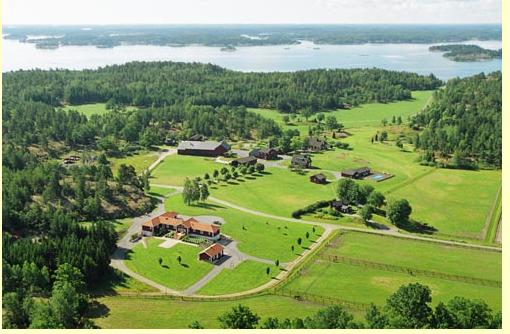
- Industry: Psychotherapy
- Founded: 1985
- Founder: Bengt Stern
- Headquarters: Norrköping 58.542462°N 16.688232°E, Sweden
- Website: http://www.mullingstorp.com/

Mullingstorp is an institute for psychotherapy situated in Sweden and started by Bengt Stern in 1985.

== Beginnings ==
In 1985 Bengt Stern founded the institute Mullingstorp Education and Health, located south of Stockholm, Sweden on the Baltic coast. It was he who designed and documented in detail the Meet Yourself process.

Bengt was a registered medical doctor. In the seventies he ran a general practice in Skärholmen outside Stockholm. He was also a writer, lecturer, society debater, course leader and course trainer. In addition to traditional medicine, Bengt Stern studied psychosomatic medicine, body therapy and also humanitarian and trans-personal psychology in Europe, India and the US.

Bengt trained a large staff who from the beginning led the courses under his leadership. Gradually he turned more and more to writing and research.

By the year 2011 around 5500 people had taken part in the Meet Yourself process. Many of those had come from the top level of business life, such as sport. and entertainment just to mention a few.

== The courses ==
The Meet Yourself Courses at Mullingstorp are based on an existential view of mankind and the world and that every event in one's life has a purpose and is therefore meaningful and as a consequence, every obstacle or cause of suffering such as relationship problems is a signal that one needs to increase one's degree of personal maturity or level of consciousness.

== Course structure ==
The first step lasts for seven days and participants meet at 07:00 in the morning and finish around 22:00 at night. There is usually one therapist for every three or four participants as well as a course leader and doctor.

The courses are intended to help people take stock of their lives and learn from misfortune in the belief that once this is achieved, they will stop fighting against themselves and see life from a larger perspective.

Furthermore, the program delineates the concept of "negative stress", which it claims is a result of emotional needs not being satisfied. In particular negative stress is caused when a person denies himself:

- his need for intimacy and love
- his ability to say "No!"
- his need for rest
- healthy food
- meditation
- sufficient exercise
- further education
- meaningful work

By denying one's own needs, it is claimed, one avoids having to show "vulnerability" or "moral courage" that is to say standing up for what is "true" and "meaningful". Bengt maintains that these capabilities will remain beyond a person's reach until they dare to meet and explore their fear and mental pain.

== Bengt's view of childhood experiences and how they shape people's later lives ==
In the book "Feeling Bad Is a Good Start", Bengt describes the ways in which childhood experiences shape a person's adult life in detail.

Bengt believed that in order to make lasting changes in one's life one must search within oneself and without any reservation, keep in touch with one's inner and outer reality. He claimed that this happens when one works with one's early emotional memories. At the same time one activates the strength and courage needed to change one's life. The theory is that when one chooses to explore one's inner and outer conflicts instead of avoiding them, not only does one's negative stress decrease but also symptoms of mental or physical disease.

== Bengt's theory of intellect ==
Bengt theorized that a person who strongly identifies with his intellect is controlled and has no possibility to reach beyond it and gain perspective on his life. Therefore, he cannot identify his emotional and/or physical needs, nor can he satisfy them.

The controlled person identifies with his roles and patterns of behavior. There are hundreds of different things that he can identify with, for example, his talents, occupation, routines, lack of self-confidence, rebellious side, disease, religion, hypocrisy, nationality, looks, his ideas, sexuality, work, title, family, circle of friends, diet, home, car, etc.

Friends and family can, in Bengt's view, nearly always reveal things that a person identifies with better than he himself. The psychologist Carl Jung used the term "shadow" to summarize the behavioral traits and patterns of a person that he cannot see in himself. A person who does not understand his own emotional needs will not know who he is or what he really wants from his life. He is forced to continue to live alone or to remain in a malfunctioning love relationship, he may not be enjoying his work and he accepts that people treat him badly.

== Childcare ==
Too many children have psychological problems, which can be attributed largely to parental influence. During the fetal period, birth and early childhood, children are strongly affected by the frame of mind of their parents. Our futures are shaped by experiences during this period.

== Mullingstorp's theories of disease ==
There is a great difference between society's views on disease and Mullingstorp's views.

Mullingstorp contrasts what they see as the treatments offered by established healthcare systems for example:

- Sobril for anxiety
- Cipramil to treat depression
- Losec to treat ulcers
- Voltaren to treat joint pain.
- Radiation, chemotherapy and, in some cases, surgery, as the dominant forms of cancer treatment

with their view that disease symptoms are existential signals that initially need to be interpreted and not reduced by external measures.

Despite the fact that Mullingstorp courses do not focus on treating symptoms, but rather on deepening self-awareness they claim that participants "always experience a substantial reduction in their mental and physical symptoms during the courses".

Mullingstorp holds the belief that with symptomatic treatment the patient's problems nearly always return in one or another form and that not until one has made a conscious effort to get rid of negative stress will the symptoms disappear more permanently.

== Research on Mullingstorp courses ==
In 2009 a study was conducted by Lotta Fernros of the Karolinska Institute into the methods used by Mullingstorp. The study measured the Health Related Quality of Life (HRQOL) in the participants at the beginning of the course. On arrival, before the course, the participants completed three questionnaires. The first was SWEDQUAL, with 61 items for self-rating of HRQOL classified in 13 areas, e.g. cognition, physical functions, sleep, pain, relations and emotions. The second was Antonovsky's Sense of Coherence with 13 items divided into three areas: comprehensibility, meaningfulness and manageability. The third was about work, education, experience of alternative medicine, sick listing and medication. Comparisons were made with population data from Statistics Sweden, the National Insurance Office and the National Board of Health and Welfare. Six of the thirteen subscales of HRQOL showed very low starting values, which is unusual in a group with such a high level of education. Eight of the subscales of HRQOL showed clinically significant improvements in the study group (>9%, p<0.01), namely: general health (9%), emotional well-being (negative 45% and positive 26%), cognitive functioning (24%), sleep (15%), pain (10%), role limitations due to emotional health (22%) and family functioning (16%). Physical, partner and sexual functioning were normal in both groups. The study concluded that the Meet Yourself Process can improve cognitive and emotional function, which in turn increases motivation. The process has the potential to be used as a starting point in rehabilitation for working life, for people who are forced for health reasons to cope with a readjustment crisis and establish a foundation for a new orientation.

== Publications ==
Bengt Stern published the following books:

- Growing into Health – about man's meeting with his inner reality (1985)
- Meet Yourself Beyond all Sense (1990)
- Feeling Bad is a Good Start (1994)

Bengt Stern's last book, "Feeling Bad is a Good Start" is published in Swedish, Norwegian, Dutch, German and English.

The book "Feeling Bad is a Good Start", attempts to give a clear picture of the psyche of man – why he reacts as he does and why he feels bad. The book also gives a background to the courses at Mullingstorp. It describes the most important exercises in the Meet Yourself process.

The book gives a taste of man's inner world. It describes how deep negative patterns in the psyche can be healed. The book is also intended to work as an alarm clock and a source of facts for those who want to take the step to get around their inner defenses and start "living life to the full".

== Controversy surrounding Mullingstorp ==
Walter Heidkampf applied in March 2008 to one of Mullingstorp's courses and was refused because he is HIV-positive. Mullingstorp claimed that a negative HIV status was required to protect the other course participants. Heidkampf sued Mullingstorp and was eventually awarded 10,000SEK in compensation. Mullingstorp was also required to pay the Swedish Disability Ombudsman 52,000SEK. The case marked the first time that an organization in Sweden had been found guilty of discriminating against someone based on their HIV status

== Links to articles about Stern and Mullingstorp ==
Viktoria mötte sig själv Tidskrift för Hälsa, February 1998 Translation

Välj livet och kärleken annars blir du sjuk Skärholmens kundtidning, September 1999 Translation

Vill gå bortom intellektet Dagens Nyheter, 2 October 2000 Translation

Gå aldrig tillbaka – Kontroversielle läkaren Bengt Sterns råd till de utbrända Dagens Industri, 14 October 2000 Translation

Själslig hälsa – utvägar ur utbrändhet och depression Söderköpings Lilla Tidning, 2002 Translation

Kroppspsykoterapin har räddat mitt liv.... Tidskrift för Hälsa, November 2003 Translation

Lyckad men inte lycklig Tara, March 2005 Translation

Befrielsen att födas Östgöta Correspondenten, May 2005 Translation

Att ge upp och få livslusten tillbaka Östersundsposten, October 2005 Translation

Att möta döden utan rädsla Östgöta Correspondenten, November 2005 Translation
