= Emmy Werner =

American psychologist (1929–2017)

Emmy E. Werner (1929 – October 12, 2017) was an American developmental psychologist known for her research on risk and resilience in children.

== Early life ==
She received her Ph.D. from the University of Nebraska and was a professor emerita in the Department of Human and Community Development at the University of California, Davis.

== Career ==
Werner was best known for her leadership of a 40-year longitudinal study of 698 infants born on the Hawaiian island of Kauai — the island's entire birth cohort for the year 1955. The study found that many children exposed to reproductive and environmental risk factors (for instance, premature birth coupled with an unstable household and a mentally ill mother) go on to experience more problems with delinquency, mental and physical health and family stability than children exposed to fewer such risk factors.

Among Werner's most significant findings was that one third of all high-risk children displayed resilience and developed into caring, competent and confident adults despite their problematic development histories. She and her fellow researchers identified a number of protective factors in the lives of these resilient individuals that helped to balance out risk factors at critical periods in their development. Among these factors were a strong bond with a nonparental caretaker (such as an aunt, babysitter, or teacher) and involvement in a church or community group like the YMCA.

Her book Through the Eyes of Innocents tells the stories of children caught up in World War II in their own words.

== Awards ==
- Distinguished Scientific Contributions to Child Development Award from the Society for Research in Child Development (1999)
- Dolley Madison Presidential Award for Outstanding Lifelong Contributions to the Development and Well-being of Children and Families (1999)
- Arnold Gesell Prize, German Society for Social Pediatrics (2001)
- University of California Constantine Panunzio Distinguished Emeriti Award (1999/2000)
- Distinguished Friend of the University Award, UC Davis (2015)

== Books ==
- Werner, E. E., & Smith, R. S. (1982). Vulnerable, but Invincible: A Longitudinal Study of Resilient Children and Youth. McGraw-Hill.
- Werner, E. E., & Smith, R. S. (1992). Overcoming the Odds: High Risk Children from Birth to Adulthood. Cornell University Press.
- Werner, E. E. (2000). Through the Eyes of Innocents: Children Witness World War II. Westview Press.
- Werner, E. E., & Smith, R. S. (2001). Journeys from Childhood to Midlife: Risk, Resilience, and Recovery. Cornell University Press.
- Werner, E. E. (2002). A Conspiracy of Decency: The Rescue of the Danish Jews during World War II. Westview Press.
- Werner, E. E. (2006). In Pursuit of Liberty: Coming of Age in the American Revolution. Greenwood Publishing Group.
- Werner, E. E. (2009). Passages to America: Oral Histories of Child Immigrants from Ellis Island and Angel Island. Potomac Books.

== See also ==
- Psychological resilience
