= Scale of Protective Factors =

The Scale of Protective Factors (SPF) is a measure of aspects of social relationships, planning behaviors and confidence. These factors contribute to psychological resilience in emerging adults and adults.

== Contents ==
The SPF consists of twenty-four statements for which individuals are asked to rate the degree to which each statement describes them. The SPF assesses a wider range of protective factors than other scales. The SPF is the only measure that has been shown to assess social and cognitive protective factors. The SPF includes four sub-scales that indicate the strengths and weaknesses that contribute to overall resilience. The SPF is the only measure to have been used in measuring resilience in sexual assault survivors within the United States.

== History ==
The SPF was developed by Elisabeth Ponce-Garcia at the science of protective factors laboratory (SPF Lab) to capture multiple aspects of adult resilience. A confirmatory factor analysis was subsequently published as collaborative research. The SPF was found to assess resilience effectively in both men and women, across risk and socio-economic status, and ethnic/racial categories.

In order to verify effectiveness in comparison to other measures, Madewell and Ponce-Garcia (2016) analyzed the SPF and four other commonly used measures of adult resilience. They found that the SPF was the only measure that assessed social and cognitive aspects and that it outperformed three other measures and performed comparably with a fourth.

The structure of the SPF in comparison to four other adult resilience measures, as well as comparison data, is available as a Data in Brief article. Noticing the absence of research examining the effectiveness of adult resilience measures in child or adult sexual assault, Ponce-Garcia, Madewell and Brown (2016) demonstrated SPF's effectiveness in that domain. An investigation of the effectiveness of the SPF in the Southern Plains Tribes of the Native American and American Indian community in 2016.

A brief version of the 24 item SPF was developed in 2019 to result in 12 item measure that can be taken as a self-assessment. The SPF-24 and the SPF-12 have been used throughout the United States and in several other countries to include Saudi Arabia, Pakistan, India, Australia, Malesia, Paraguay, Mexico, and Canada. It is listed as a resource by Harvard University, was included in the United States Army Substance Abuse Program (ASAP-Fort Sill, OK), and is provided by the State of Oklahoma ReEntry Program.

== Properties ==
The SPF consists of four sub-scales, two social protective factors and two cognitive protective factors.

=== Social subscales ===
Social support measures the availability of social resources in the form of family and/or friends. Social skill measures the ability to make and maintain relationships. The two should be positively correlated. Higher scores on the social sub-scales indicate unity with friends and/or family, friend/family group optimism and general friend/family support.

=== Cognitive subscales ===
The goal efficacy sub-scale measures confidence in the ability to achieve goals. The planning and prioritizing behavior sub-scale measures the ability to recognize the relative importance of tasks, the tendency to approach tasks in order of importance, and the use of lists for organization.

=== Scoring ===
Adding the scores from the four sub-scales results in an overall resilience score. Adding scores from either the two social sub-scales or the two cognitive sub-scales results in a social resilience or cognitive resilience score, respectively. The sub-scale scores can also be viewed as an individual profile of strengths and deficits to indicate priorities for therapeutic plans.

This additive approach could theoretically allow varying subscale scores to cancel each other out and incorrectly indicate low overall resilience. However, research shows that social and cognitive characteristics work together to support resilience. This concern is also not supported by the characteristics of the SPF. Rather than assessing the number of friends or the frequency of social interaction, the SPF assesses the level of comfort in interacting socially. Similarly, rather than assessing the number of goals or tasks, the SPF assesses confidence in reaching goals once set.

The sub-scales are moderately positively correlated and that they all contribute to overall resilience.
