= Psychological resilience =

Ability to mentally cope with a crisis

Psychological resilience, or mental resilience, is the ability to cope mentally and emotionally with a crisis, or to return to pre-crisis status quickly. Resilience is generally understood either as a developmental process that can be cultivated over time, or as a relatively stable personality trait. Researchers have identified numerous internal factors that influence resilience, including self-esteem, self-regulation, optimism, and emotional intelligence, as well as external factors such as social support from family, friends, and community.

The term was popularized in the 1970s and 1980s by psychologist Emmy Werner, who conducted a forty-year longitudinal study of children from low socioeconomic status backgrounds in Kauai, Hawaii. Werner found that roughly one-third of at-risk children developed into well-adjusted adults despite adverse circumstances, which she attributed to protective factors in their personalities, families, and communities.

Biological research has linked resilience to neurotransmitter systems involving dopamine and endogenous opioids, as well as to epigenetic modifications and brain structures such as the prefrontal cortex and hippocampus. Positive emotions play a significant role in resilience, helping individuals recover from stress and build enduring social resources. People can enhance their resilience through cognitive-behavioral techniques, mindfulness practices, social support, and other psychological interventions.

Resilience has been studied across diverse contexts including childhood adversity, natural disasters, bereavement, workplace stress, and military service. Research indicates that cultural factors influence how resilience manifests. Individualist and collectivist societies show different patterns of coping and recovery. While resilience is widely regarded as beneficial, some researchers have criticized the concept for potentially shifting responsibility for disaster recovery from institutions to individuals.

== Overview ==
A resilient person uses "mental processes and behaviors in promoting personal assets and protecting self from the potential negative effects of stressors". Psychological resilience is an adaptation in a person's psychological traits and experiences that allows them to regain or remain in a healthy mental state during crises/chaos without long-term negative consequences.

It is difficult to measure and test this psychological construct because resilience can be interpreted in a variety of ways. Most psychological paradigms (biomedical, cognitive-behavioral, sociocultural, etc.) have their own perspective of what resilience looks like, where it comes from, and how it can be developed. There are numerous definitions of psychological resilience, most of which center around two concepts: adversity and positive adaptation. Positive emotions, social support, and hardiness can influence a person to become more resilient.

A psychologically resilient person can resist adverse mental conditions that are often associated with unfavorable life circumstances. This differs from psychological recovery which is associated with returning to those mental conditions that preceded a traumatic experience or personal loss.

Research on psychological resilience has shown that it plays a crucial role in promoting mental health and well-being. Resilient people are better equipped to navigate life's challenges, maintain positive emotions, and recover from setbacks. They demonstrate higher levels of self-efficacy, optimism, and problem-solving skills, which contribute to their ability to adapt and thrive in adverse situations.

Resilience is a "positive adaptation" after a stressful or adverse situation. When a person is "bombarded by daily stress, it disrupts their internal and external sense of balance, presenting challenges as well as opportunities." The routine stressors of daily life can have positive impacts which promote resilience. Some psychologists believe that it is not stress itself that promotes resilience but rather the person's perception of their stress and of their level of control. Stress allows people to practice resilience over time, different levels of stress vary among different individuals and the reason for that being is unknown. However, it is known that some people can handle stress better than others.

Stress can be experienced in a person's life course at times of difficult life transitions, involving developmental and social change; traumatic life events, including grief and loss; and environmental pressures, encompassing poverty and community violence.

Resilience is the integrated adaptation of physical, mental, and spiritual aspects to circumstances, and a coherent sense of self that is able to maintain normative developmental tasks that occur at various stages of life. The Children's Institute of the University of Rochester explains that "resilience research is focused on studying those who engage in life with hope and humor despite devastating losses".

Resilience is not only about overcoming a deeply stressful situation, but also coming out of such a situation with "competent functioning". Resiliency allows a person to rebound from adversity as a strengthened and more resourceful person.

Some characteristics associated with psychological resilience include: an easy temperament, good self-esteem, planning skills, and a supportive environment inside and outside of the family.

When an event is appraised as comprehensible (predictable), manageable (controllable), and somehow meaningful (explainable) a resilient response is more likely.

== Process ==
Psychological resilience is commonly understood as a process. It can also be characterized as a tool a person develops over time, or as a personal trait of the person ("resiliency"). Most research shows resilience as the result of people being able to interact with their environments and participate in processes that either promote well-being or protect them against the overwhelming influence of relative risk. This research supports the model in which psychological resilience is seen as a process rather than a trait—something to develop or pursue, rather than a static endowment or endpoint.

When people are faced with an adverse condition, there are three ways in which they may approach the situation.

1. respond with anger or aggression
2. become overwhelmed and shut down
3. feel the emotion about the situation and appropriately handle the emotion

Resilience is promoted through the third approach, which is employed by individuals who adapt and change their current patterns to cope with disruptive states, thereby enhancing their well-being.In contrast, the first and second approaches lead individuals to adopt a victim mentality, blaming others and rejecting coping methods even after a crisis has passed. These individuals tend to react instinctively rather than respond thoughtfully, clinging to negative emotions such as fear, anger, anxiety, distress, helplessness, and hopelessness. Such emotions decrease problem-solving abilities and weaken resilience, making it harder to recover. Resilient people, on the other hand, actively cope, bounce back, and find solutions. Their resilience is further supported by protective environments, including good families, schools, communities, and social policies, which provide cumulative protective factors that bolster their ability to withstand and recover from exposure to risk factors.

Resilience can be viewed as a developmental process (the process of developing resilience), or as indicated by a response process. In the latter approach, the effects of an event or stressor on a situationally relevant indicator variable are studied, distinguishing immediate responses, dynamic responses, and recovery patterns. In response to a stressor, more-resilient people show some (but less than less-resilient people) increase in stress. The speed with which this stress response returns to pre-stressor levels is also indicative of a person's resilience.

== Biological models ==
From a scientific standpoint, resilience's contested definition is multifaceted in relation to genetics, revealing a complex link between biological mechanisms and resilience:

"Resilience, conceptualized as a positive bio-psychological adaptation, has proven to be a useful theoretical context for understanding variables for predicting long-term health and well-being".

Three notable bases for resilience—self-confidence, self-esteem and self-concept—each have roots in a different nervous system—respectively, the somatic nervous system, the autonomic nervous system, and the central nervous system.

Research indicates that, like trauma, resilience is influenced by epigenetic modifications. Increased DNA methylation of the growth factor GDNF in certain brain regions promotes stress resilience, as do molecular adaptations of the blood–brain barrier.

A broader integrative biological framework has been proposed by Feldman (2020), who argues that resilience cannot be understood solely through isolated neurotransmitters or brain regions. Instead, resilience emerges from the interaction of three interconnected biological systems: the oxytocin system, the affiliative brain, and biobehavioral synchrony.

Oxytocin is an evolutionarily ancient neuropeptide that originally regulated basic physiological functions such as thermoregulation. During mammalian evolution, however, its role expanded to include labor, lactation, parental caregiving, and social bonding. Within Feldman's model, oxytocin serves as a key mechanism underlying neural plasticity by facilitating the brain's ability to reorganize itself in response to environmental experiences. In addition, oxytocin reduces fear responses, promotes trust, and enhances motivation for social interaction. These effects create a biological sense of safety that enables individuals to adapt to stressful situations and supports the development of resilience.

The affiliative brain refers to a network of neural structures that enables humans to establish and maintain close interpersonal relationships. While this network evolved from the maternal caregiving system found in other mammals, it has become substantially more Expand annotationcomplex in humans through the involvement of higher-order cortical regions. These brain areas support empathy, mentalization, emotional regulation, and perspective taking, allowing individuals to manage stress through cooperative social relationships rather than relying solely on defensive responses. Consequently, the affiliative brain provides the neurobiological basis for adaptive social functioning and psychological resilience.

The third central component is biobehavioral synchrony, which describes the dynamic coordination of biological and behavioral processes between interaction partners. Synchrony can be observed through the matching of physiological responses, such as heart rate and oxytocin release, as well as through coordinated eye contact, facial expressions, vocalizations, and body movements. During early development, repeated episodes of synchrony between caregiver and infant establish a "rhythm of safety" that enables children to regulate emotions, tolerate stress, and recover from temporary disruptions in social interactions. Over time, these repeated experiences contribute to the maturation of neural systems involved in emotional and social functioning (Feldman, 2020). A modern parallel appears in adult contemplative dyad training, where structured daily synchrony with a changing partner, rather than a fixed caregiver fostered growing felt closeness and reduced cortisol stress reactivity over weeks, suggesting that synchrony-based resilience mechanisms remain trainable well beyond early development.

The two neurotransmitters primarily responsible for stress buffering within the brain are dopamine and endogenous opioids, as evidenced by research showing that dopamine and opioid antagonists increased stress response in both humans and animals. Primary and secondary rewards reduce negative reactivity. Primary rewards are stimuli that are attributed to basic needs, such as water, food, and physical well-being. On the other hand, secondary rewards are accomplished by experiences or social interactions of stress in the brain in both humans and animals. The relationship between social support and stress resilience is thought to be mediated by the oxytocin system's impact on the hypothalamic-pituitary-adrenal axis.

Alongside such neurotransmitters, stress-induced alterations in brain structures, such as the prefrontal cortex (PFC) and hippocampus have been linked to mental health issues like depression and anxiety. The increased activation of the medial prefrontal cortex and glutamatergic circuits has emerged as a potential factor in enhancing resilience as "environmental enrichment... increases the complexity of... pyramidal neurons in hippocampus and PFC, suggesting... a shared feature of resilience under these two distinct condition[s]."

== In communication context ==
The field of communication has studied resilience within several contexts, including organizational communication.

== Sport models ==
Within the athletic context, resilience is conceptualized not only as an inherent trait but also as a dynamic process shaped by training, motivation and environmental conditions. Psychological models in sports commonly distinguished between trait resilience — the relatively stable disposition toward perseverance and historically conceptualized as hardiness — and process resilience, which refers to skill that allows adaptive responses to adversity over time. These models align with performance related outcomes such as stress recovery and competitive consistency.

== History ==
The first research on resilience was published in 1973. The study used epidemiology—the study of disease prevalence—to uncover the risks and the protective factors that now help define resilience. A year later, the same group of researchers created tools to look at systems that support development of resilience.

Emmy Werner was one of the early scientists to use the term resilience. She studied a cohort of children from Kauai, Hawaii. Kauai was quite poor and many of the children in the study grew up with alcoholic or mentally ill parents. Many of the parents were also out of work. Werner noted that of the children who grew up in these detrimental situations, two-thirds exhibited destructive behaviors in their later-teen years, such as chronic unemployment, substance abuse, and out-of-wedlock births (in girls). However, one-third of these youths did not exhibit destructive behaviors. Werner called the latter group resilient. Thus, resilient children and their families were those who, by definition, demonstrated traits that allowed them to be more successful than non-resilient children and families.

Resilience also emerged as a major theoretical and research topic in the 1980s in studies of children with mothers diagnosed with schizophrenia. A 1989 study showed that children with a schizophrenic parent may not obtain an appropriate level of comforting caregiving—compared to children with healthy parents—and that such situations often had a detrimental impact on children's development. On the other hand, some children of ill parents thrived and were competent in academic achievement, which led researchers to make efforts to understand such responses to adversity.

Since the onset of the research on resilience, researchers have been devoted to discovering protective factors that explain people's adaptation to adverse conditions, such as maltreatment, catastrophic life events, or urban poverty. Researchers endeavor to uncover how some factors (e.g. connection to family) may contribute to positive outcomes.

== Trait resilience ==
Temperamental and constitutional disposition is a major factor in resilience. It is one of the necessary precursors of resilience along with warmth in family cohesion and accessibility of prosocial support systems. There are three kinds of temperamental systems that play part in resilience: the appetitive system, defensive system, and attentional system.

Trait resilience is negatively correlated with the personality traits of neuroticism and negative emotionality, which represent tendencies to see and react to the world as threatening, problematic, and distressing, and to view oneself as vulnerable. Trait resilience is positively correlated with personality traits of openness and positive emotionality, which are associated with tendencies to approach and confront problems with confidence, while also maintaining autonomy and fostering adaptability to those life changes.

Resilience traits are personal characteristics that express how people approach and react to events that they experience as negative. Trait resilience is generally considered via two methods: direct assessment of traits through resilience measures and proxy assessments of resilience in which existing cognate psychological constructs are used to explain resilient outcomes. Typically, trait resilience measures explore how individuals tend to react to and cope with adverse events. Proxy assessments of resilience, sometimes referred to as the buffering approach, view resilience as the antithesis of risk, focusing on how psychological processes interrelate with negative events to mitigate their effects. Possibly an individual perseverance trait, conceptually related to persistence and resilience, could also be measured behaviorally by means of arduous, difficult, or otherwise unpleasant tasks.

== Developing and sustaining resilience ==
There are several theories or models that attempt to describe subcomponents, prerequisites, predictors, or correlates of resilience.

Fletcher and Sarkar found five factors that develop and sustain a person's resilience:

1. the ability to make realistic plans and being capable of taking the steps necessary to follow through with them
2. confidence in one's strengths and abilities
3. communication and problem-solving skills
4. the ability to manage strong impulses and feelings
5. having good self-esteem

Among older adults, Kamalpour et al. found that the important factors are external connections, grit, independence, self-care, self-acceptance, altruism, hardship experience, health status, and positive perspective on life.

Another study examined thirteen high-achieving professionals who seek challenging situations that require resilience, all of whom had experienced challenges in the workplace and negative life events over the course of their careers but who had also been recognized for their great achievements in their respective fields. Participants were interviewed about everyday life in the workplace as well as their experiences with resilience and thriving. The study found six main predictors of resilience: positive and proactive personality, experience and learning, sense of control, flexibility and adaptability, balance and perspective, and perceived social support. High achievers were also found to engage in many activities unrelated to their work such as engaging in hobbies, exercising, and organizing meetups with friends and loved ones.

Contact with nature has been observed to boost health and well-being at the societal/infrastructural level (i.e. through individuals having contact with nature and nature-based solutions) and the individual/group level (including nature therapy). One way that nature therapies improve health is through fostering resilience to manage various kinds of stressors. A concept known as nature-based biopsychosocial resilience theory (NBRT) has been developed which provides a framework to explain the role that nature plays in building and maintaining resilience-related adaptive resources.

The American Psychological Association, in its popular psychology-oriented Psychology topics publication, suggests the following tactics people can use to build resilience:

- Prioritize relationships.
- Join a social group.
- Take care of your body.
- Practice mindfulness.
- Avoid negative coping outlets (like alcohol use).
- Help others.
- Be proactive; search for solutions.
- Make progress toward your goals.
- Look for opportunities for self-discovery.
- Keep things in perspective.
- Accept change.
- Maintain a hopeful outlook.
- Learn from your past.

The idea that one can build one's resilience implies that resilience is a developable characteristic, and so is perhaps at odds with the theory that resilience is a process.

=== Positive emotions ===
The relationship between positive emotions and resilience has been extensively studied. People who maintain positive emotions while they face adversity are more flexibile in their thinking and problem solving. Positive emotions also help people recover from stressful experiences. People who maintain positive emotions are better-defended from the physiological effects of negative emotions, and are better-equipped to cope adaptively, to build enduring social resources, and to enhance their well-being.

The ability to consciously monitor the factors that influence one's mood is correlated with a positive emotional state. This is not to say that positive emotions are merely a by-product of resilience, but rather that feeling positive emotions during stressful experiences may have adaptive benefits in the coping process. Resilient people who have a propensity for coping strategies that concretely elicit positive emotions—such as benefit-finding and cognitive reappraisal, humor, optimism, and goal-directed problem-focused coping—may strengthen their resistance to stress by allocating more access to these positive emotional resources. Social support from caring adults encouraged resilience among participants by providing them with access to conventional activities.

Positive emotions have physiological consequences. For example, humor leads to improvements in immune system functioning and increases in levels of salivary immunoglobulin A, a vital system antibody, which serves as the body's first line of defense in respiratory illnesses. Other health outcomes include faster injury recovery rate and lower readmission rates to hospitals for the elderly, and reductions in the length of hospital stay. One study has found early indications that older adults who have increased levels of psychological resilience have decreased odds of death or inability to walk after recovering from hip fracture surgery. In another study, trait-resilient individuals experiencing positive emotions more quickly rebounded from cardiovascular activation that was initially generated by negative emotional arousal.

=== Social support ===
Social support is an important factor in the development of resilience. While many competing definitions of social support exist, they tend to concern one's degree of access to, and use of, strong ties to other people who are similar to oneself. Social support requires solidarity and trust, intimate communication, and mutual obligation both within and outside the family.

Military studies have found that resilience is also dependent on group support: unit cohesion and morale is the best predictor of combat resiliency within a unit or organization. Resilience is highly correlated with peer support and group cohesion. Units with high cohesion tend to experience a lower rate of psychological breakdowns than units with low cohesion and morale. High cohesion and morale enhance adaptive stress reactions. War veterans who had more social support were less likely to develop post-traumatic stress disorder.

=== Cognitive behavioral therapy ===
A number of self-help approaches to resilience-building have been developed, drawing mainly on cognitive behavioral therapy (CBT) and rational emotive behavior therapy (REBT). For example, a group cognitive-behavioral intervention, called the Penn Resiliency Program (PRP), fosters aspects of resilience. A meta-analysis of 17 PRP studies showed that the intervention significantly reduces depressive symptoms over time.

In CBT, building resilience is a matter of mindfully changing behaviors and thought patterns. The first step is to change the nature of self-talk—the internal monologue people have that reinforces beliefs about their self-efficacy and self-value. To build resilience, a person needs to replace negative self-talk, such as "I can't do this" and "I can't handle this", with positive self-talk. This helps to reduce psychological stress when a person faces a difficult challenge. The second step is to prepare for challenges, crises, and emergencies. Businesses prepare by creating emergency response plans, business continuity plans, and contingency plans. Similarly, an individual can create a financial cushion to help with economic stressors, maintain supportive social networks, and develop emergency response plans.

=== Language learning and communication ===
Language learning and communication help develop resilience in people who travel, study abroad, work internationally, or in those who find themselves as refugees in countries where their home language is not spoken.

Research conducted by the British Council found a strong relationship between language and resilience in refugees. Providing adequate English-learning programs and support for Syrian refugees builds resilience not only in the individual, but also in the host community. Language builds resilience in five ways:

home language and literacy development
Development of home language and literacy helps create the foundation for a shared identity. By maintaining the home language, even when displaced, a person not only learns better in school, but enhances their ability to learn other languages. This improves resilience by providing a shared culture and sense of identity that allows refugees to maintain close relationships to others who share their identity and sets them up to possibly return one day.

access to education, training, and employment
This allows refugees to establish themselves in their host country and provides more ease when attempting to access information, apply to work or school, or obtain professional documentation. Securing access to education or employment is largely dependent on language competency, and both education and employment provide security and success that enhance resilience and confidence.

learning together and social cohesion
Learning together encourages resilience through social cohesion and networks. When refugees engage in language-learning activities with host communities, engagement and communication increases. Both refugee and host community are more likely to celebrate diversity, share their stories, build relationships, engage in the community, and provide each other with support. This creates a sense of belonging with the host communities alongside the sense of belonging established with other members of the refugee community through home language.

addressing the effects of trauma on learning
Additionally, language programs and language learning can help address the effects of trauma by providing a means to discuss and understand. Refugees are more capable of expressing their trauma, including the effects of loss, when they can effectively communicate with their host community. Especially in schools, language learning establishes safe spaces through storytelling, which further reinforces comfort with a new language, and can in turn lead to increased resilience.

building inclusivity
This is more focused on providing resources. By providing institutions or schools with more language-based learning and cultural material, the host community can learn how to better address the needs of the refugee community. This feeds back into the increased resilience of refugees by creating a sense of belonging and community.

Another study shows the impacts of storytelling in building resilience. It aligns with many of the five factors identified by the study completed by the British Council, as it emphasizes the importance of sharing traumatic experiences through language. It showed that those who were exposed to more stories, from family or friends, had a more holistic view of life's struggles, and were thus more resilient, especially when surrounded by foreign languages or attempting to learn a new language.

=== Development programs ===
The Head Start program promotes resilience, as does the Big Brothers Big Sisters Programme, Centered Coaching & Consulting,, the Abecedarian Early Intervention Project, and social programs for youth with emotional or behavioral difficulties.

The Positive Behavior Supports and Intervention program is a trauma-informed, resilience-based program for elementary age students. It has four components: positive reinforcements such as encouraging feedback; understanding that behavior is a response to unmet needs or a survival response; promoting belonging, mastery, and independence; and creating an environment to support the student through sensory tools, mental health breaks, and play.

Tuesday's Children, a family service organization, works to build psychological resilience through programs such as Mentoring and Project Common Bond, an eight-day peace-building and leadership initiative for people aged 15–20, from around the world, who have been directly impacted by terrorism.

Military organizations test personnel for the ability to function under stressful circumstances by deliberately subjecting them to stress during training. Those students who do not exhibit the necessary resilience can be screened out of the training. Those who remain can be given stress inoculation training. The process is repeated as personnel apply for increasingly demanding positions, such as special forces.

An example of psychological resilience can be seen in survivors of natural disasters who manage to rebuild their lives despite profound personal loss. Such individuals often demonstrate adaptability, emotional strength, and a capacity to regain stability after trauma.

=== Other factors ===
Another protective factor involves external social support, which helps moderate the negative effects of environmental hazards or stressful situations and guides vulnerable individuals toward optimistic paths. One study distinguished three contexts for protective factors:

1. Personal Attributes: Traits such as an outgoing personality, perceptiveness, and a positive self-concept.
2. Family Environment: Close and supportive relationships with at least one family member or an emotionally stable parent.
3. Community Support: Support and guidance from peers and community members.

A study of the elderly in Zurich, Switzerland, illuminated the role humor plays to help people remain happy in the face of age-related adversity.

Research has also been conducted into individual differences in resilience. Self-esteem, ego-control, and ego-resiliency are related to behavioral adaptation. Maltreated children who feel good about themselves may process risk situations differently by attributing different reasons to the environments they experience and, thereby, avoiding negative internalized self-perceptions. Ego-control is "the threshold or operating characteristics of an individual with regard to the expression or containment" of their impulses, feelings, and desires. Ego-resilience refers to the "dynamic capacity, to modify his or her model level of ego-control, in either direction, as a function of the demand characteristics of the environmental context"

Demographic information (e.g., gender) and resources (e.g., social support) also predict resilience. After disaster women tend to show less resilience than men, and people who were less involved in affinity groups and organisations also showed less resilience.

Certain aspects of religions, spirituality, or mindfulness could promote or hinder certain psychological virtues that increase resilience. However, as of 2009 the "there has not yet been much direct empirical research looking specifically at the association of religion and ordinary strengths and virtues". In a review of the literature on the relationship between religiosity/spirituality and PTSD, about half of the studies showed a positive relationship and half showed a negative relationship between measures of religiosity/spirituality and resilience. The United States Army was criticized for promoting spirituality in its Comprehensive Soldier Fitness program as a way to prevent PTSD, due to the lack of conclusive supporting data.

Forgiveness plays a role in resilience among patients with chronic pain (but not in the severity of the pain).

Resilience is also enhanced in people who develop effective coping skills for stress. Coping skills help people reduce stress levels, so they remain functional. Coping skills include using meditation, exercise, socialization, and self-care practices to maintain a healthy level of stress.

Bibliotherapy, positive tracking of events, and enhancing psychosocial protective factors with positive psychological resources are other methods for resilience building. Increasing a person's arsenal of coping skills builds resilience.

A study of 230 adults, diagnosed with depression and anxiety, showed that emotional regulation contributed to resilience in patients. The emotional regulation strategies focused on planning, positively reappraising events, and reducing rumination. Patients with improved resilience experienced better treatment outcomes than patients with non-resilience focused treatment plans. This suggests psychotherapeutic interventions may better handle mental disorders by focusing on psychological resilience.

Other factors associated with resilience include the capacity to make realistic plans, self-confidence and a positive self image, communications skills, and the capacity to manage strong feelings and impulses.

== Children ==
Adverse childhood experiences (ACEs) are events that occur in a child's life that could lead to maladaptive symptoms such as tension, low mood, repetitive and recurring thoughts, and avoidance of things associated with the adverse event.

Maltreated children who experience some risk factors (e.g., single parenting, limited maternal education, or family unemployment), show lower ego-resilience and intelligence than children who were not maltreated. Maltreated children are also more likely to withdraw and demonstrate disruptive-aggressive and internalized behavior problems. Ego-resiliency and positive self-esteem predict competent adaptation in maltreated children.

Psychological resilience which helps overcome adverse events does not solely explain why some children experience post-traumatic growth and some do not.

Resilience is the product of a number of developmental processes over time that allow children to experience small exposures to adversity or age appropriate challenges and develop skills to handle those challenges. This gives children a sense of pride and self-worth.

Two "protective factors"—characteristics of children or situations that help children in the context of risk—are good cognitive functioning (like cognitive self-regulation and IQ) and positive relationships (especially with competent adults, like parents). Children who have protective factors in their lives tend to do better in some risky contexts. However, children do better when not exposed to high levels of risk or adversity.

There are a few protective factors of young children that are consistent over differences in culture and stressors (poverty, war, divorce of parents, natural disasters, etc.):

- capable parenting
- other close relationships
- intelligence
- self-control
- motivation to succeed
- self-confidence and self-efficacy
- faith, hope, belief life has meaning
- effective schools
- effective communities
- effective cultural practices

Ann Masten calls these protective factors "ordinary magic"—the ordinary human adaptive systems that are shaped by biological and cultural evolution. In her book, Ordinary Magic: Resilience in Development, she discusses the "immigrant paradox", the phenomenon that first-generation immigrant youth are more resilient than their children. Researchers hypothesize that "there may be culturally based resiliency that is lost with succeeding generations as they become distanced from their culture of origin". Another hypothesis is that those who choose to immigrate are more likely to be more resilient.

=== Neurocognitive resilience ===
Trauma is defined as an emotional response to distressing event, and PTSD is a mental disorder that develops after a person has experienced a dangerous event — for instance, a car accident or environmental disaster. The findings of a study conducted on a sample of 226 individuals who had experienced trauma indicate a positive association between resilience and enhanced nonverbal memory, as well as a measure of emotional learning. The findings of the study indicate that individuals who exhibited resilience demonstrated a lower incidence of depressed and post-traumatic stress disorder (PTSD) symptoms. Conversely, those who lacked resilience exhibited a higher likelihood of experiencing unemployment and having a history of suicide attempts. The research additionally revealed that the experience of severe childhood abuse or exposure to trauma was correlated with a lack of resilience. The results indicate that resilience could potentially serve as a substitute measure for emotional learning, a process that is frequently impaired in stress-related mental disorders. This finding has the potential to enhance our comprehension of resilience.

=== Young adults ===
Sports provide benefits such as social support or a boost in self confidence. The findings of a study investigating the correlation between resilience and symptom resolution in adolescents and young adults who have experienced sport-related concussions (SRC) indicate that individuals with lower initial resilience ratings tend to exhibit a higher number and severity of post-concussion symptoms (PCSS), elevated levels of anxiety and depression, and a delayed recovery process from SRC. Additionally, the research revealed that those who initially scored lower on resilience assessments were less inclined to describe a sense of returning to their pre-injury state and experienced more pronounced exacerbation of symptoms resulting from both physical and cognitive exertion, even after resuming sports or physical activity. This finding illustrates the significant impact that resilience can have on the process of physical and mental recovery.

=== Role of the family ===
Family environments that are caring and stable, hold high expectations for children's behavior, and encourage participation by children in the life of the family are environments that more successfully foster resilience in children. Most resilient children have a strong relationship with at least one adult (not always a parent), and this relationship helps to diminish risk associated with family discord.

Parental resilience—the ability of parents to deliver competent high-quality parenting, despite the presence of risk factors—plays an important role in children's resilience. Understanding the characteristics of quality parenting is critical to the idea of parental resilience. However, resilience research has focused on the well-being of children, with limited academic attention paid to factors that may contribute to the resilience of parents.

Even if divorce produces stress, the availability of social support from family and community can reduce this stress and yield positive outcomes.

A family that emphasizes the value of assigned chores, caring for brothers or sisters, and the contribution of part-time work in supporting the family helps to foster resilience.

Some practices that poor parents utilize help to promote resilience in families. These include frequent displays of warmth, affection, and emotional support; reasonable expectations for children combined with straightforward, not overly harsh discipline; family routines and celebrations; and the maintenance of common values regarding money and leisure. According to sociologist Christopher B. Doob, "Poor children growing up in resilient families have received significant support for doing well as they enter the social world—starting in daycare programs and then in schooling."

The Besht model of natural resilience-building through parenting, in an ideal family with positive access and support from family and friends, has four key markers:

1. realistic upbringing
2. effective risk communications
3. positivity and restructuring of demanding situations
4. building self efficacy and hardiness

In this model, self-efficacy is the belief in one's ability to organize and execute the courses of action required to achieve goals and hardiness is a composite of interrelated attitudes of commitment, control, and challenge.

=== Role of school ===
Resilient children in classroom environments work and play well, hold high expectations, and demonstrate locus of control, self-esteem, self-efficacy, and autonomy. Together, these practices can counteract the behaviors that are associated with learned helplessness.

Research on Mexican–American high school students found that a sense of belonging to school was the only significant predictor of academic resilience, though a sense of belonging to family, a peer group, and a culture can also indicate higher academic resilience. "Although cultural loyalty overall was not a significant predictor of resilience, certain cultural influences nonetheless contribute to resilient outcomes, like familism and cultural pride and awareness." The results "indicate a negative relationship between cultural pride and the ethnic homogeneity of a school". The researchers hypothesize that "ethnicity becomes a salient and important characteristic in more ethnically diverse settings".

A strong connection with one's cultural identity is an important protective factor against stress and is indicative of increased resilience. While classroom resources have been created to promote resilience in students, the most effective ways to ensure resilience in children is by protecting their natural adaptive systems from breaking down or being hijacked. At home, resilience can be promoted through a positive home environment and emphasizing cultural practices and values. In school, this can be done by ensuring that each student develops and maintains a sense of belonging to the school through positive relationships with classroom peers and a caring teacher. A sense of belonging—whether it be in a culture, family, or another group—predicts resiliency against any given stressor.

=== Role of the community ===
Communities play a role in fostering resilience. The clearest sign of a cohesive and supportive community is the presence of social organizations that provide healthy human development. Services are unlikely to be used unless there is good communication about them. Children who are repeatedly relocated do not benefit from these resources, as their opportunities for resilience-building community participation are disrupted with every relocation.

=== Outcomes in adulthood ===
Patients who show resilience to adverse events in childhood may have worse outcomes later in life. A study in the American Journal of Psychiatry interviewed 1420 participants with a Child and Adolescent Psychiatric Assessment up to 8 times as children. Of those 1,266 were interviewed as adults, and this group had higher risks for anxiety, depression and problems with work or education. This was accompanied by worse physical health outcomes. The study authors posit that the goal of public health should be to reduce childhood trauma, and not promote resilience.

== Specific situations ==
=== Divorce ===
Cultivating resilience may be beneficial to all parties involved in divorce. The level of resilience a child will experience after their parents have split is dependent on both internal and external variables. Some of these variables include their psychological and physical state and the level of support they receive from their schools, friends, and family friends. Children differ by age, gender, and temperament in their capacity to cope with divorce. About 20–25% of children "demonstrate severe emotional and behavioral problems" when going through a divorce, compared to 10% of children exhibiting similar problems in married families. Despite this, approximately 75–80% of these children will "develop into well-adjusted adults with no lasting psychological or behavioral problems". This goes to show that most children have the resilience needed to endure their parents' divorce.

The effects of the divorce extend past the separation of the parents. Residual conflict between parents, financial problems, and the re-partnering or remarriage of parents can cause stress. Studies have shown conflicting results about the effect of post-divorce conflict on a child's healthy adjustment. Divorce may reduce children's financial means and associated lifestyle. For example, economizing may mean a child cannot continue to participate in extracurricular activities such as sports and music lessons, which can be detrimental to their social lives.

A parent's repartnering or remarrying can add conflict and anger to a child's home environment. One reason re-partnering causes additional stress is because of the lack of clarity in roles and relationships; the child may not know how to react and behave with this new quasi-parent figure in their life. Bringing in a new partner/spouse may be most stressful when done shortly after the divorce. Divorce is not a single event, but encompasses multiple changes and challenges. Internal factors promote resiliency in the child, as do external factors in the environment. Certain programs such as the 14-week Children's Support Group and the Children of Divorce Intervention Program may help a child cope with the changes that occur from a divorce.

=== Bullying ===
Beyond preventing bullying, it is also important to consider interventions based on emotional intelligence when bullying occurs. Emotional intelligence may foster resilience in victims. When a person faces stress and adversity, especially of a repetitive nature, their ability to adapt is an important factor in whether they have a more positive or negative outcome.

One study examining adolescents who illustrated resilience to bullying found higher behavioral resilience in girls and higher emotional resilience in boys. The study's authors suggested the targeting of psychosocial skills as a form of intervention. Emotional intelligence promotes resilience to stress and the ability to manage stress and other negative emotions can restrain a victim from going on to perpetuate aggression. Emotion regulation is an important factor in resilience. Emotional perception significantly facilitates lower negative emotionality during stress, while emotional understanding facilitates resilience and correlates with positive affect.

=== Natural disasters ===
Resilience after a natural disaster can be gauged on an individual level (each person in the community), a community level (everyone collectively in the affected locality), and on a physical level (the locality's environment and infrastructure).

UNESCAP-funded research on how communities show resiliency in the wake of natural disasters found that communities were more physically resilient if community members banded together and made resiliency a collective effort. Social support, especially the ability to pool resources, is key to resilience. Communities that pooled social, natural, and economic resources were more resilient and could overcome disasters more quickly than communities that took a more individualistic approach.

The World Economic Forum met in 2014 to discuss resiliency after natural disasters. They concluded that countries that are more economically sound, and whose members can diversify their livelihoods, show higher levels of resiliency. As of 2014 this had not been studied in depth, but the ideas discussed in this forum appeared fairly consistent with existing research.

Individual resilience in the wake of natural disasters can be predicted by the level of emotion the person experienced and was able to process during and following the disaster. Those who employ emotional styles of coping were able to grow from their experiences and to help others. In these instances, experiencing emotions was adaptive. Those who did not engage with their emotions and who employed avoidant and suppressive coping styles had poorer mental health outcomes following disaster.

=== Death of a family member ===
As of 2006 little research had been done on the topic of family resilience in the wake of the death of a family member. Clinical attention to bereavement has focused on the individual mourning process rather than on the family unit as a whole. Resiliency in this context is the "ability to maintain a stable equilibrium" that is conducive to balance, harmony, and recovery. Families manage familial distortions caused by the death of the family member by reorganizing relationships and changing patterns of functioning to adapt to their new situation. People who exhibiting resilience in the wake of trauma can successfully traverse the bereavement process without long-term negative consequences.

One of the healthiest behaviors displayed by resilient families in the wake of a death is honest and open communication. This facilitates an understanding of the crisis. Sharing the experience of the death can promote immediate and long-term adaptation. Empathy is a crucial component in familial resilience because it allows mourners to understand other positions, tolerate conflict, and grapple with differences that may arise. Another crucial component to resilience is the maintenance of a routine that binds the family together through regular contact and order. The continuation of education and a connection with peers and teachers at school is an important support for children struggling with the death of a family member.

=== Workplace settings ===
Resilience has been examined in the context of failure and setbacks in workplace settings. Psychological resilience is one of the core constructs of positive organizational behavior and has captured scholars' and practitioners' attention. Research has highlighted certain personality traits, personal resources (e.g., self-efficacy, work-life balance, social competencies), personal attitudes (e.g., sense of purpose, job commitment), positive emotions, and work resources (e.g., social support, positive organizational context) as potential facilitators of workplace resilience.

Attention has also been directed to the role of resilience in innovative contexts. Due to high degrees of uncertainty and complexity in the innovation process, failure and setbacks happen frequently in this context. These can harm affected individuals' motivation and willingness to take risks, so their resilience is essential for them to productively engage in future innovative activities. A resilience construct specifically aligned to the peculiarities of the innovation context was needed to diagnose and develop innovators' resilience: Innovator Resilience Potential (IRP). Based on Bandura's social cognitive theory, IRP has six components: self-efficacy, outcome expectancy, optimism, hope, self-esteem, and risk propensity. It reflects a process perspective on resilience: IRP can be interpreted either as an antecedent of how a setback affects an innovator, or as an outcome of the process that is influenced by the setback situation. A measurement scale of IRP was developed and validated in 2018.

== Cultural differences ==
There is controversy about the indicators of good psychological and social development when resilience is studied across different cultures and contexts. The American Psychological Association's Task Force on Resilience and Strength in Black Children and Adolescents, for example, notes that there may be special skills that these young people and families have that help them cope, including the ability to resist racial prejudice. Researchers of indigenous health have shown the impact of culture, history, community values, and geographical settings on resilience in indigenous communities. People who cope may also show "hidden resilience" when they do not conform with society's expectations for how someone is supposed to behave (for example, in some contexts aggression may aid resilience, or less emotional engagement may be protective in situations of abuse).

=== Resilience in individualist and collectivist communities ===
Individualist cultures, such as those of the U.S., Austria, Spain, and Canada, emphasize personal goals, initiatives, and achievements. Independence, self-reliance, and individual rights are highly valued by members of individualistic cultures. The ideal person in individualist societies is assertive, strong, and innovative. People in this culture tend to describe themselves in terms of their unique traits—"I am analytical and curious". Economic, political, and social policies reflect the culture's interest in individualism.

Collectivist cultures, such as those of Japan, Sweden, Turkey, and Guatemala, emphasize family and group work goals. The rules of these societies promote unity, brotherhood, and selflessness. Families and communities practice cohesion and cooperation. The ideal person in collectivist societies is trustworthy, honest, sensitive, and generous—emphasizing intrapersonal skills. Collectivists tend to describe themselves in terms of their roles—"I am a good husband and a loyal friend".

In a study on the consequences of disaster on a culture's individualism, researchers operationalized these cultures by identifying indicative phrases in a society's literature. Words that showed the theme of individualism include, "able, achieve, differ, own, personal, prefer, and special". Words that indicated collectivism include, "belong, duty, give, harmony, obey, share, together".

==== Differences in response to natural disasters ====
Natural disasters threaten to destroy communities, displace families, degrade cultural integrity, and diminish an individual's level of functioning. Comparing individualist community reactions to collectivist community responses after natural disasters illustrates their differences and respective strengths as tools of resilience.

Some suggest that because disasters strengthen the need to rely on other people and social structures, they reduce individual agency and the sense of autonomy, and so regions with heightened exposure to disaster should cultivate collectivism. However, interviews with and experiments on disaster survivors indicate that disaster-induced anxiety and stress decrease one's focus on social-contextual information—a key component of collectivism. So disasters may increase individualism.

In a study into the association between socio-ecological indicators and cultural-level change in individualism, for each socio-ecological indicator, frequency of disasters was associated with greater (rather than less) individualism. Supplementary analyses indicated that the frequency of disasters was more strongly correlated with individualism-related shifts than was the magnitude of disasters or the frequency of disasters qualified by the number of deaths.

Baby-naming is one indicator of change. Urbanization was linked to preference for uniqueness in baby-naming practices at a one-year lag, secularism was linked to individualist shifts in interpersonal structure at both lags, and disaster prevalence was linked to more unique naming practices at both lags. Secularism and disaster prevalence contributed mainly to shifts in naming practices.

Disaster recovery research focuses on psychology and social systems but does not adequately address interpersonal networking or relationship formation and maintenance. One disaster response theory holds that people who use existing communication networks fare better during and after disasters. Moreover, they can play important roles in disaster recovery by organizing and helping others use communication networks and by coordinating with institutions.

Building strong, self-reliant communities whose members know each other, know each other's needs, and are aware of existing communication networks, is a possible source of resilience in disasters.

Individualist societies promote individual responsibility for self-sufficiency; collectivist culture defines self-sufficiency within an interdependent communal context. Even where individualism is salient, a group thrives when its members choose social over personal goals and seek to maintain harmony, and where they value collectivist over individualist behavior.

=== The concept of resilience in language ===
While not all languages have a direct translation for the English word "resilience", nearly every culture has a word that relates to a similar concept, suggesting a common understanding of what resilience is. Even if a word does not directly translate to "resilience" in English, it relays a meaning similar enough to the concept and is used as such within the language.

If a specific word for resilience does not exist in a language, speakers of that language typically assign a similar word that insinuates resilience based on context. Many languages use words that translate to "elasticity" or "bounce", which are used in context to capture the meaning of resilience. For example, one of the main words for "resilience" in Chinese literally translates to "rebound", one of the main words for "resilience" in Greek translates to "bounce" (another translates to "cheerfulness"), and one of the main words for "resilience" in Russian translates to "elasticity", just as it does in German. However, this is not the case for all languages. For example, if a Spanish speaker wanted to say "resilience", their main two options translate to "resistance" and "defense against adversity". Many languages have words that translate better to "tenacity" or "grit" better than they do to "resilience". While these languages may not have a word that exactly translates to "resilience", English speakers often use the words tenacity or grit when referring to resilience. Arabic has a word solely for resilience, but also two other common expressions to relay the concept, which directly translate to "capacity on deflation" or "reactivity of the body", but are better translated as "impact strength" and "resilience of the body" respectively. A few languages, such as Finnish, have words that express resilience in a way that cannot be translated back to English. In Finnish, the word and concept "sisu" has been recently studied by a designated Sisu Scale, which is composed of both beneficial and harmful sides of sisu. Sisu, measured by the Sisu Scale, has correlations with English language equivalents, but the harmful side of sisu does not seem to have any corresponding concept in English-language-based scales. Sometimes sisu has been translated to "grit" in English; sisu blends the concepts of resilience, tenacity, determination, perseverance, and courage into one word that has become a facet of Finnish culture.

== Measurement ==
=== Direct measurement ===
Resilience is measured by evaluating personal qualities that reflect people's approach and response to negative experiences. Trait resilience is typically assessed using two methods: direct evaluation of traits through resilience measures, and proxy assessment of resilience, in which related psychological constructs are used to explain resilient outcomes.

There are more than 30 resilience measures that assess over 50 different variables related to resilience, but there is no universally accepted "gold standard" for measuring resilience.

Five of the established self-report measures of psychological resilience are:

Ego Resiliency Scale
measures a person's ability to exercise control over their impulses or inhibition in response to environmental demands, with the aim of maintaining or enhancing their ego equilibrium.
Hardiness Scale
encompasses three main dimensions: (1) commitment (a conviction that life has purpose), (2) control (confidence in one's ability to navigate life), and (3) challenge (aptitude for and pleasure in adapting to change)
Psychological Resilience Scale
assesses a "resilience core" characterized by five traits (purposeful life, perseverance, self-reliance, equanimity, and existential aloneness) that reflect an individual's physical and mental resilience throughout their lifespan
Connor-Davidson Resilience Scale
developed in a clinical treatment setting that conceptualized resilience as arising from four factors: (1) control, commitment, and change hardiness constructs
Brief Resilience Scale
assesses resilience as the capacity to bounce back from unfavorable circumstances

The Resilience Systems Scales was produced to investigate and measure the underlying structure of the 115 items from these five most-commonly cited trait resilience scales in the literature. Three strong latent factors account for most of the variance accounted for by the five most popular resilience scales, and replicated ecological systems theory:

Engineering resilience
The capability of a system to quickly and effortlessly restore itself to a stable equilibrium state after a disruption, as measured by its speed and ease of recovery.
Ecological resilience
The capacity of a system to endure or resist disruptions while preserving a steady state and adapting to necessary changes in its functioning.
Adaptive capacity
The ability to continuously adjust functions and processes in order to be ready to adapt to any disruption.

=== 'Proxy' measurement ===
Resilience literature identifies five main trait domains that serve as stress-buffers and can be used as proxies to describe resilience outcomes:

personality
A resilient personality includes positive expressions of the five-factor personality traits such as high emotional stability, extraversion, conscientiousness, openness, and agreeableness.

cognitive abilities and executive functions
Resilience is identified through effective use of executive functions and processing of experiential demands, or through an overarching cognitive mapping system that integrates information from current situations, prior experience, and goal-driven processes.

affective systems, which include emotional regulation systems
Emotion regulation systems are based on the broaden-and-build theory, in which there is a reciprocal relationship between trait resilience and positive emotional functioning through emotional management, coping, and regulation achieved by means of attention control, cognitive reappraisal, and coping strategies.

eudaimonic well-being
resilience emerges from natural well-being processes (e.g. autonomy, purpose in life, environmental mastery) and underlying genetic and neural substrates and acts as a protective resilient factor across life-span transitions.

health systems
This also reflects the broaden-and-build theory, where there is a reciprocal relationship between trait resilience and positive health functioning through the promotion of feeling capable to deal with adverse health situations.

=== Mixed model ===
A mixed model of resilience can be derived from direct and proxy measures of resilience. A search for latent factors among 61 direct and proxy resilience assessments, suggested four main factors:

recovery
Resilience scales that focus on recovery, such as engineering resilience, align with reports of stability in emotional and health systems. The most fitting theoretical framework for this is the broaden-and-build theory of positive emotions. This theory highlights how positive emotions can foster resilient health systems and enable individuals to recover from setbacks.
sustainability
Resilience scales that reflect "sustainability", such as engineering resilience, align with conscientiousness, lower levels of dysexecutive functioning, and five dimensions of eudaimonic well-being. Theoretically, resilience is the effective use of executive functions and processing of experiential demands (also known as resilient functioning), where an overarching cognitive mapping system integrates information from current situations, prior experience, and goal-driven processes (known as the cognitive model of resilience).
adaptability resilience
Resilience scales that assess adaptability, such as adaptive capacity, are associated with higher levels of extraversion (such as being enthusiastic, talkative, assertive, and gregarious) and openness-to-experience (such as being intellectually curious, creative, and imaginative). These personality factors are often reported to form a higher-order factor known as "beta" or "plasticity", which reflects a drive for growth, agency, and reduced inhibition by preferring new and diverse experiences while reducing fixed patterns of behavior. These findings suggest that adaptability can be seen as a complement to growth, agency, and reduced inhibition.
social cohesion
Several resilience measures converge to suggest an underlying social cohesion factor, in which social support, care, and cohesion among family and friends (as featured in various scales within the literature) form a single latent factor.

These findings point to the possibility of adopting a "mixed model" of resilience in which direct assessments of resilience could be employed alongside cognate psychological measures to improve the evaluation of resilience.

== Criticism ==
As with other psychological phenomena, there is controversy about how resilience should be defined. Its definition affects research focuses; differing or imprecise definitions lead to inconsistent research. Research on resilience has become more heterogeneous in its outcomes and measures, convincing some researchers to abandon the term altogether due to it being attributed to all outcomes of research where results were more positive than expected.

There is also disagreement among researchers as to whether psychological resilience is a character trait or state of being. Psychological resilience has also been referred to as ecological concept, ranging from micro to macro levels of interpretation.

However, it is generally agreed upon that resilience is a buildable resource. There is also evidence that resilience can indicate a capacity to resist a sharp decline in other harm even though a person temporarily appears to get worse. Adolescents who have a high level of adaptation (i.e. resilience) tend to struggle with dealing with other psychological problems later on in life. This is due to an overload of their stress response systems. There is evidence that the higher one's resilience is, the lower one's vulnerability.

Brad Evans and Julian Reid criticize resilience discourse and its rising popularity in their book, Resilient Life. The authors assert that policies of resilience can put the onus of disaster response on individuals rather than publicly coordinated efforts. With the emergence of critiques regarding neoliberalism and climate change Evans and Reid argue that promoting resilience draws attention away from governmental responsibility and towards self-responsibility.

== See also ==
- Adaptive performance
- Community resilience
- Differential susceptibility hypothesis
- Hardiness (psychology)
- Health realization
- Mental toughness
- Neuroplasticity
- Salutogenesis
- Scale of Protective Factors (SPF)
- Self (psychology)
- Stress management
