= Bengt Stern =

Bengt Stern (3 October 1930 - 6 September 2002) was a Swedish author and doctor. He first had a practice in Skärholmen outside of Stockholm. Besides the traditional medicine, Stern also studied psychosomatic medicine, body-psymatic therapy and humanistic and transpersonal psychology in Europe, India and the USA. In 1986 Stern started the Mullingstorp which he had inherited in 1960. His widow and three children sold the property in 2010 to new owners, who continue to run it under the new name Mullingstorp Kursgård AB.
