= Hardiness (psychology) =

Ability to endure stress without negative health effects

Psychological hardiness, alternatively referred to as personality hardiness or cognitive hardiness in the literature, is a personality style first introduced by Suzanne C. Kobasa in 1979. Kobasa described a pattern of personality characteristics that distinguished managers and executives who remained healthy under life stress, as compared to those who developed health problems. In the following years, the concept of hardiness was further elaborated in a book and a series of research reports by Salvatore Maddi, Kobasa and their graduate students at the University of Chicago.

== Definitions ==
In early research on hardiness, it was usually defined as a personality structure that functions as a resistance resource in encounters with stressful conditions. The personality structure is composed of the three related general dispositions:

commitment
a tendency to involve oneself in activities in life and to have a genuine interest in and curiosity about the surrounding world (activities, things, other people)
control
a tendency to believe and act as if one can influence the events taking place around oneself through one's own efforts
challenge
the belief that change, rather than stability, is the normal mode of life and constitutes motivating opportunities for personal growth rather than threats to security

Maddi characterized hardiness as a combination of three attitudes (commitment, control, and challenge) that provide the courage and motivation needed to turn stressful circumstances from potential calamities into opportunities for personal growth. P.T. Bartone considers hardiness as something more global than mere attitudes. He conceives of hardiness as a broad personality style or generalized mode of functioning that includes cognitive, emotional, and behavioural qualities. This style of functioning affects how one views oneself and interacts with the world around.

== Historical roots ==
Early conceptualizations of hardiness are evident in Maddi's work, most notably in his descriptions of the ideal identity and premorbid personality. In 1967, Maddi argued that chronic states of meaninglessness and alienation from existence were becoming typical features of modern life. Like other existential psychologists before him, Maddi believed that feelings of apathy and boredom, and inability to believe in the interest-value of the things one is engaged in—feelings that characterised modern living—were caused by upheavals in culture and society, increased industrialization and technological power, and more rigidly differentiated social structures in which people's identities were defined in terms of their social roles.

Maddi went on to outline two distinct personality types, based on how people identify or see themselves. The premorbid personality sees him- or herself in fairly simple terms, as nothing more than “a player of social roles and an embodiment of biological needs.” This type of identity thus stresses qualities that are the least unique for him or her when compared to other species (biological needs) or other people (social roles). According to Maddi, people with a premorbid identity can continue with their life for a long time and ostensibly feel adequate and reasonably successful. However, this personality type is also prone to being precipitated into a state of chronic existential neurosis under conditions of stress. This existential neurosis is characterized by the belief that one's life is meaningless, by feelings of apathy and boredom, and by a sense that one's activities are not chosen.

In stark contrast to the premorbid personality, one finds the ideal identity. Though still a player of social roles and an expression of the biological sides of man, this personality type also has a deeper and richer understanding of his or her unique psychological side – mental processes like symbolization, imagination, and judgement. Whereas the premorbid personality accepts social roles as given, feels powerless to influence actions, and merely tries to play the roles as well as possible; the ideal identity, through expression of his or her psychological side, does not feel powerless in the face of social pressure. This person can perceive alternatives to mere role-playing, can switch roles more easily, and even redefine existing roles. As a consequence of this deeper psychological understanding of the self, the ideal identity is actively engaged in and interested in life, is willing to act to influence events, and is interested in new experiences and in learning new things.

== Resiliency mechanisms ==
Hardiness is often considered an important factor in psychological resilience or an individual-level pathway leading to resilient outcomes. A body of research suggests that hardiness has beneficial effects and buffers the detrimental effect of stress on health and performance. Although early studies relied almost exclusively on male business executives, over the years this buffer-effect has been demonstrated in a large variety of occupational groups as well as non-professionals, including military groups, teachers and university staff, firefighters, and students. However, not every investigation has demonstrated such moderating or buffering effects and there is a debate whether the effects of hardiness are interactive or primarily independent of levels of stress.

Hardiness appears to confer resiliency by means of a combination of cognitive and behavioural mechanisms, and biophysical processes. Very simplified: as stressful circumstances mount, so does the physical and mental strain on the person, and if this strain is sufficiently intense and prolonged, breakdowns in health and performance are to be expected. The personality style of hardiness moderates this process by encouraging effective mental and behavioural coping, building and utilizing social support, and engaging in effective self-care and health practices.

=== Cognitive appraisals ===
According to Kobasa, people high in hardiness tend to put stressful circumstances into perspective and interpret them as less threatening. As a consequence of these optimistic appraisals, the impact of the stressful events is reduced and they are less likely to negatively affect the health of the person. Research on self-reported stressors, real-life stressful experiences, and laboratory-induced stress support this claim. For example, two studies used military cadets undergoing stressful training as participants and found that cadets that scored high on hardiness appraised the combat training in less threatening terms, and at the same time viewed themselves as more capable of coping with the training.

=== Behavioral coping ===
The coping style most commonly associated with hardiness is transformational coping, which transforms stressful events into less stressful ones. At the cognitive level this involves setting the event into a broader perspective in which it does not seem so terrible. At the level of action, people high in hardiness are believed to react to stressful events by increasing their interaction with them, trying to turn them into an advantage and opportunity for growth. In the process they achieve greater understanding. In support of this notion, two studies demonstrated that the effects of hardiness on symptoms of illness were partly mediated through the positive relation of hardiness to presumed beneficial coping styles and the negative relation to presumed harmful styles of coping.

=== Social resources and health-promoting behaviour ===
Transformational coping can also include health-promoting behaviour and recruiting or making adequate use of social resources. One study showed that in relation to work-environment stress, support from the boss but not support from home promoted health among executives high in hardiness. For those executives ranked low in hardiness, support from the boss did not promote health and family support worsened their health status. These results suggested that hardy people know what type of support to use in a given situation. Another study found support for an indirect effect of hardiness through social support on post-traumatic stress symptomatology in American veterans of the Vietnam War.

Although several studies found hardiness to be related to making good use of social resources, some studies failed to support this, finding instead that the two concepts made independent contributions to positive health outcomes.

Several investigations found hardiness and physical exercise to be uncorrelated. However, one study examined a broad array of health-protective behaviours, including exercise, and found that hardiness worked indirectly through these behaviours to influence health. Another study found that hardiness was negatively correlated with self-reported alcohol use and with drug use obtained through both urine screens and self-report.

=== Biophysiology ===
Hardiness appears to be related to differences in physiological arousal. Hardiness helps decrease how much stressful events produce arousal in the sympathetic nervous system. Study participants who score high on hardiness exhibit lower cardiovascular reactivity in response to stress.

Another study examined the functional efficacy of immune cells in participants who scored low and high on hardiness. It considered in vitro proliferation of lymphocytes in response to invading microorganisms (antigens and mitogens), a process believed to mimic the series of events that occurs in vivo following stimulation by invading microorganisms. Results showed that participants who scored high on hardiness had significantly higher mean antigen- and mitogen-induced proliferative responses.

Other studies associated hardiness with variations in cholesterol and hormone levels. Bartone and associates examined hardiness levels against a full lipid profile including high-density lipoprotein, usually considered a beneficial type of cholesterol. This study showed that participants high in hardiness were more than two times as likely to have high levels of high-density lipoprotein compared with participants low in hardiness. Although hardiness might be related to lower levels of the “stress-hormone” cortisol, one of the few studies that investigated this found higher hardiness associated with higher levels of cortisol.

== Measurement ==
Several instruments measure hardiness. The most frequently used are the Personal Views Survey, the Dispositional Resilience Scale, and the Cognitive Hardiness Scale. Other scales based on hardiness theory have been designed to measure hardiness in specific contexts and in special populations, for example parental grief and among the chronically ill.

Hardiness, like many personality variables in the field of psychology, measures a continuous dimension. People vary in their levels of hardiness along a continuum from low to high, with a small percentage scoring at the extreme low/high ends. Given large enough samples, the distribution of scores on hardiness measures approximates a normal, Gaussian distribution.

== Similarities with other constructs ==
Hardiness has some similarities with other personality constructs. Chief among these are locus of control, sense of coherence (SOC), self-efficacy, and dispositional optimism. Despite their very different theoretical approaches – hardiness arose from existential psychology and philosophy, SOC has its roots in sociology, whereas locus of control, self-efficacy, and dispositional optimism are all based on a learning/social cognitive perspective – some striking similarities are present. People with a strong SOC perceive life as comprehensible, cognitively meaningful, and manageable. Persons with strong SOC are more likely to adapt to demanding situations and can cope successfully with strenuous life events. Both SOC and the commitment dimension of hardiness emphasize an ability to feel deeply involved in the aspects of our lives. Furthermore, both SOC and control emphasize personal resources in facing the demands of stressful situations. The most notable difference between SOC and hardiness is the challenge facet, with the former highlighting stability whereas the latter emphasizes change.

Hardiness and the remaining constructs of locus of control, dispositional optimism, and self-efficacy all emphasize goal-directed behaviour in some form. For instance, in accordance with the theory of dispositional optimism, what we expect will be the outcomes of our behaviour helps determine whether we respond to adversity by continuing our efforts or by disengagement. Holding a positive outlook leads to continuous effort to obtain a goal, whereas negative expectations of the future lead to giving up. Similarly, in Bandura's writings on self-efficacy, our beliefs about our ability to do what is required to manage prospective situations highly influences the situations we seek out and the goals we set.

== See also ==
- Existentialism – Philosophy dealing with absurdity of existence
- Mental toughness – Measure of perseverance through difficult challenges
- Psychological resilience – Ability to mentally cope with a crisis
- Psychology – Study of mental functions and behaviors
- Salutogenesis – Medical approach focusing on factors favouring health
- Stress management – Techniques and therapies to manage stress
