= Defense physiology =

Changes in body functions with stress

Defense physiology is a term used to refer to the symphony of body function (physiology) changes which occur in response to a stress or threat.

When the body executes the "fight-or-flight" reaction or stress response, the nervous system initiates, coordinates and directs specific changes in how the body is functioning, preparing the body to deal with the threat. (See also General adaptation syndrome.)

== Definitions ==
Stress : As it pertains to the term defense physiology, the term stress refers to a perceived threat to the continued functioning of the body / life according to its current state.

Threat: A threat may be consciously recognized or not. A physical event (a loud noise or car collision or a coming attack), a chemical or a biological agent which alters (or has the possibility to alter) body function (physiology) away from optimum or healthy functioning (or away from its current state of functioning) may be perceived as a threat (also called a stressor).

Life circumstances, though posing no immediate physical danger, could be perceived as a threat. Anything that could change the continuing of the person’s life as they are currently experiencing it could be perceived as a threat.

== Physiological reactions to threat (or perceived threat) ==
A threat may be either empirical (an outside observer may agree that the event or circumstance poses a threat) or a priori (an outside observer would not agree that the event or circumstance poses a threat). What is important to the individual, in terms of the body’s response, is that a threat is perceived.

The perception of a threat may also trigger an associated ‘feeling of distress’. Physiological reactions triggered by mind cannot differentiate both the physical or mental threat separately, Hence the "fight-or-flight" response of mind for the both reactions will be same.

== Duration of threat and its different physiological effects on the nervous system. ==
Acute Stress Reaction - The body executes the “fight-or-flight” reaction to get the body out of danger quickly. When the timing between the threat and the resolution of the threat are close, the “fight-or-flight" reaction is executed, the threat is handled, and the body returns to its previous state (taking care of the business of life - digestion, relaxation, tissue repair etc.). The body has evolved to stay in this mode for only a short time.

Chronic Stress State - When the timing between the threat and the resolution of the threat are more distant (the threat or the perception of threat is prolonged or other threats occur before the body has recovered), the “fight-or-flight" reaction continues and becomes the new "standard operating condition" of the body, "chronic defense physiology". Continuing in this mode produces significant negative effects (distress) in many aspects of body functioning (physical, mental and emotional distress).

== See also ==
- Hypothalamic–pituitary–adrenal axis
