= Mental toughness =

Measure of perseverance through difficult challenges

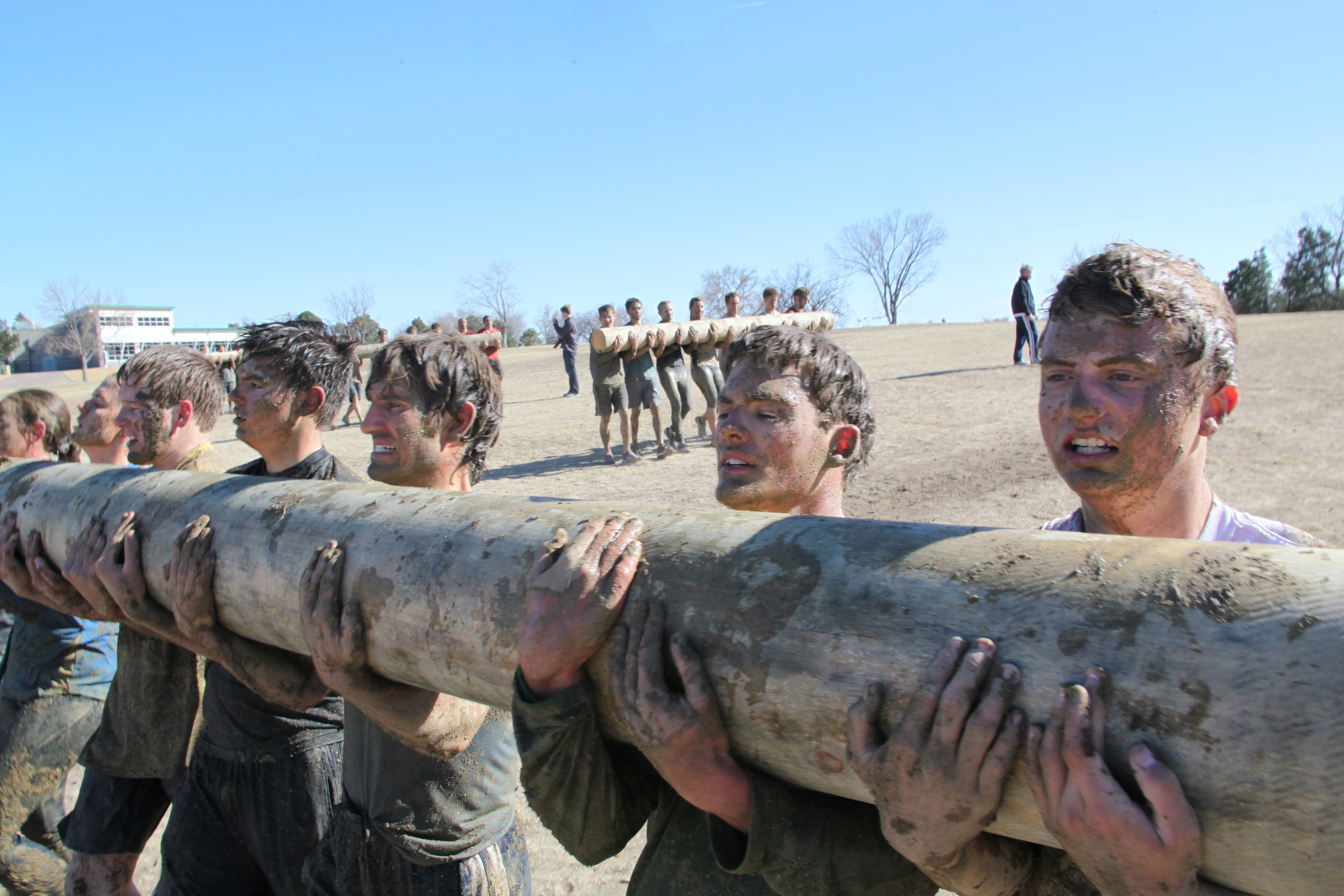
The United States Olympic Sailing Team carry a 220-pound log during Navy SEAL "mental toughness" training

Mental toughness is a psychological trait involving confidence, emotional and behavioral control, commitment to goals, persistence under stress, and an intermediate belief to interpret challenges as opportunities for growth, enabling individuals not only to endure adversity but also to function effectively and pursue excellence. It is a measure of an individual’s psychological resilience and confidence under pressure, adversity, uncertainty, and challenge. Mental toughness shares key characteristics with grit and may predict success in sport, education, and professional settings. Near-synonyms of mental toughness include hardiness, determination, strong-willed, and stalwart.

The concept emerged in the context of sports training and sports psychology as one of a set of attributes that allows a person to become a better athlete, cope with difficult training and competitive situations, and emerge without losing confidence. The term has been used by coaches, sport psychologists, sports commentators, and business leaders.

== Definition ==
"Mental toughness" is frequently used colloquially to refer to any set of positive mental attributes that helps a person to cope with difficult situations. Coaches and sport commentators freely use the term mental toughness to describe the mental state of athletes who persevere through difficult sport circumstances, such as playing while hurt, to succeed. In support of this, a number of studies have linked mental toughness to sporting success or achievement. However, the phrase is often simply applied as a default explanation for any victory. This imprecise use of the term has drawn criticism.

Scientific research has attempted a formal definition of mental toughness as a psychological construct with clear measurement criteria, which would allow robust analyses and comparisons to be made.

In particular, three research teams produced both a definition and a construct definition for mental toughness: being able to push past failures or blockades by remaining positive and competitive. This involves training the mind to be ready for challenges.

=== Jones, Hanton, and Connaughton ===
Graham Jones, Sheldon Hanton, and Declan Connaughton of the United States used personal construct psychology in interviews with elite athletes, as well as elite-level coaches and sport psychologists, to arrive at the following definition of mental toughness:

Having the natural or developed psychological edge that enables you to: generally, cope better than your opponents with the many demands (competition, training, lifestyle) that sport places on a performer; specifically, be more consistent and better than your opponents in remaining determined, focused, confident, and in control under pressure.

These same researchers published a second paper which provided four dimensions (categories) for mental toughness attributes: a general dimension of a performer's attitude or mindset (specifically, the performer's focus and self-belief), and three time-specific dimensions: training, competition, and post-competition. These time-specific dimensions contain attributes of mental toughness (such as handling pressure, handling failure, and pushing yourself to your physical limit in training) that pertain to their use at those times.

=== Clough and Earle ===
Peter Clough et al. proposed a model of mental toughness that conceptualizes it as a personality trait. Their model has four components: confidence, challenge, control, and commitment. They developed a questionnaire by which to measure mental toughness. To bridge the gap between research and practice, they combined existing psychological theory with applied sport psychology. They saw comparisons between their emerging mental toughness data and the concept of hardiness, a key individual difference and resistance resource that helps buffer stress and has become an accepted concept in health psychology within the study of the stress-illness relationship. They believe mental toughness has broad application and should not be limited to the sports domain. They feel that sports-specific measures are unlikely to move the field forward in any meaningful ways. The development work relating to their model is fully described and discussed in their book on mental toughness.

=== Gucciardi, Gordon, and Dimmock ===
Daniel Gucciardi, Sandy Gordon, and James Dimmock of Australia have proposed a different definition and framework of mental toughness, based primarily on their work with Australian footballers. Using personal construct psychology, these authors proposed the following definition of mental toughness:

Mental toughness in Australian Football is a collection of values, attitudes, behaviors, and emotions that enable you to persevere and overcome any obstacle, adversity, or pressure experienced, but also to maintain concentration and motivation when things are going well to consistently achieve your goals.

Although this definition was produced through work with Australian footballers, it has been generalized to other sports, including cricket and soccer. This definition conceives mental toughness as having reactive and proactive qualities; players can use mental toughness attributes to help endure and perform well during adverse situations, but can also employ other attributes of mental toughness when the game is going well, to keep them playing at their best.

== Studies ==
Some psychologists argued that a separate, sport-specific definition of mental toughness should be developed. The attributes of a mentally tough athlete in one sport may differ greatly from the attributes of a mentally tough athlete in a different sport. Differences have also been hypothesized between male and female athletes, and between "team sport" and "individual sport" athletes, but to date, little empirical evidence has shown what these differences are.

Sport-specific studies of mental toughness have been conducted in cricket, soccer, gymnastics, and Australian football. These studies have not employed a common framework, although many have used the definition of mental toughness provided by either the Jones et al. study or the Gucciardi et al. study.

Many sports-focused studies employed the Clough model of mental toughness. They use samples of athletes to investigate a possible link between toughness, coping, emotional reactivity, psychological skills, and performance.

The late Dr. Jim Loehr applied mental toughness training models to both sports and the workplace (for "corporate athletes"). For Loehr, mental toughness in sports meant being able to overcome adversity (such as trailing during a match or game, or not performing well during competition) in an effort to reach the Ideal Performance State.

Loehr posited that athletes often performed in the states of tanking (quitting), anger (uncontrolled negative feelings), choking (fear) and the IPS. Athletes with mental toughness were able to move from one of the first three stages into the IPS. To reach the IPS, successful athletes in Loehr's research often used rituals (such as bouncing the ball the same number of times before each tennis serve) developed and performed during lessons and practices, then repeated in matches to trigger learned, positive behaviors and results.

One of the few published studies that takes mental toughness out of the sporting domain is based on the 4 'C's model. This study showed that senior managers are tougher than their junior colleagues. Clough and his team are working in a number of areas outside of sport—education, health, social, and occupational—to explore the relevance of mental toughness in these areas.

In 2019, a study using a personality assessment identified six personality traits of top NCAA Division I and professional athletes that define mental toughness. This study also highlighted that the traits that make up mental toughness and that predict athletic success are some of the same traits seen in the most successful sales professionals.

In April 2020, researchers found that top gamers shared the ability to cope with stressors as well as Olympian athletes.

Mental toughness can also be found in the workplace. It has been found that when those in positions of influence instill mental toughness in their team members, those team members are more productive, take less sick leave, and work better together when collaboration arises.

=== Developmental studies ===
There is debate about whether mental toughness is primarily a developed characteristic, or has a genetic basis. Two studies suggest that foundational processes during development enable individuals to build mental toughness throughout life. For instance, a study of American soccer players, parents, and coaches found that parents provide a "generalized form" of mental toughness upon which coaches can build a sport-specific form of mental toughness. A similar study suggested that mental toughness development proceeds first through the development of a tough attitude (strong focus and strong self-belief); upon a tough attitude, an athlete learns how to develop mental toughness attributes needed for training, then for competition. Another study examined the developmental experiences of ten super-elite athletes and found that coaches and significant adults played an important role in mental toughness development through all stages of talent development.

Horsburgh et al. demonstrated that genetic and non-shared environmental factors contribute to the development of mental toughness (as measured by questionnaire), and that mental toughness behaves "in the same manner as virtually every personality trait that has ever been investigated in behavioural genetic study". In establishing significant relationships with the big five personality factors of Costa and McCrae (1992), these researchers have also provided evidence to support Clough et al.'s conceptualization of mental toughness. While embracing the importance of genetics, Clough acknowledges that mental toughness can be developed.

=== Mental Toughness in the Workplace ===
Ruparel et al suggest that the relationship between mental toughness and more job demand leads to better authentic happiness. Higher job demand led to increased happiness, by means of mental toughness.

Additionally, it has been found that employees with higher levels of mental toughness may experience lower levels of stress than their colleagues. Further, lower stress levels and higher abilities to cope can lead to increases in job performance. Individuals in the workplace may become proficient if the skill of being mentally tough is taught and reiterated.

Mental toughness has led to better performance among employees. One trait of mental toughness is the tendency for improved performance on task-oriented goals. Another trait of high mental toughness is it leads to achievement goal making, providing individuals with a state of mind to go above and beyond at work. Finally, individuals equipped with mental toughness are better suited to handle stress at work.

Mental toughness invokes motivation and drive in goal achieving. It helps with problem solving abilities and supports personal hope. Additionally higher mental toughness can give a better desire for learning, boost confidence, and resilience. Resilience in adversity can foster competitiveness in the workplace.

Research done by Turkington et al. studied mental health and perceived stress. It was found that perceived in mental health workers was related to low mental toughness. The research suggests that increasing mental toughness is needed to combat high stress.

=== Mental Toughness in the Military ===
There is limited research and methods by which one can measure for mental toughness. However the military has been a great population by which research has been conducted in order to better understand this mindset.

One of these studies was conducted by Smith et al. who looked at active-duty Airman's decreased suicidal rates in relation to those who had a support group and mental toughness. Their efforts to scale mental toughness came from the Mental Toughness Psychological Skills Profile (MTPSP; Asken 2005). They found that there could be a link between suicidal ideations decreasing when social groups were present, which those social groups helped facilitate mental toughness and self-confidence.

In an effort to better understand how to test for mental toughness Arthur et al. developed and tested for a scale in hopes to better understand and define mental toughness through a study with military recruits, the scale is known as the Military Training Mental Toughness Inventory (MTMTI). Over the span of three studies, Fitzwater et al. claim it to have proper psychometric properties, good reliability (tested through test-retest methods) concurrent validity and could be used as a decent predictor of performance.

=== Academics and Mental toughness ===
St Clair-Thompson found that mental toughness plays a significant role in academics. Mental toughness is positively associated with increases in academic attainment and attendance. It also plays a positive role in school behavior and peer relationships. Mental toughness in academics is often incorrectly assumed to be the same thing as Grit. Mental toughness and Grit are similar, but they are not the same thing. Grit is having patience and perseverance to complete a long term goal. Mental toughness refers to a mental state capable of being meaningful, purposeful, and flexible when trying to achieve a goal. Both play a part in academic achievement.

On average, mentally tough people deal with academic anxiety more positively, by using coping mechanisms rather than avoidance techniques. Mental toughness acts as a mediator between academic anxiety and academic avoidance, which allows individuals to be more successful in academic endeavors. Due to mental toughness being a state of mind, it can be improved when practiced.

Like Grit, resilience is often used interchangeably with mental toughness. It has a similar meaning, but once again, they are not the same. Stock states that mental toughness must be paired with resilience, but resilience can exist without mental toughness. In academics, mental toughness can be measured through confidence and positive attitudes during difficulties. Men usually report higher Mental toughness than women, but recent evidence suggests that mental toughness may be expressed differently between genders. Especially in an academic environment. Maintaining mental toughness and a feeling of control is correlated with higher academic performance in both men and women.

== Similar constructs ==
Mental toughness has been equated with better-understood constructs from psychology such as resilience and hardiness.

The term resilience is often incorrectly used interchangeably with mental toughness, though researchers have found the two constructs are positively associated with one another. However, psychologists define resilience as a positive adaptive process of coping with stress and adversity, as opposed to a collection of psychological attributes or personality traits.

Hardiness has been suggested as a similar construct to mental toughness. Hardiness has typically been constructed as a stable personality trait. This differs from the conceptions of mental toughness offered by both Jones et al. and Gucciardi et al. Those authors conceive of mental toughness as unstable, arising in development, fluctuating over time, and varying for an individual performer between different sport and life scenarios.

This definitional dilemma plagues the use of the term mental toughness. In addition, if mental toughness exists as a valid construct it may on occasion be maladaptive. Evidence to support this contention is derived from a study of overtraining behaviors and mental toughness. The author reported: "The results suggest that some attributes of MT may relate to increased ability to recover whereas other attributes are associated with lower recovery ... Arguably mental toughness is more closely linked with goal fixedness rather than adaptability and a flexible mindset, attributes which are central to resilience."

== Measurement ==
Two instruments have been developed and validated since 2009. Gucciardi et al. validated the American Football Mental Toughness Inventory (AFMTI), while Sheard and Golby validated the Sports Mental Toughness Questionnaire (SMTQ). The MTQ48 predates these by seven years. The factor structure of the MTQ48 has been supported by an independent research group. Dr Lee Crust, University of Lincoln, compared the SMTQ with the MTQ48 and concluded "Both instruments appear to tap the core components of MT but the MTQ48 seemingly provides a more comprehensive measure".

The MTQ48 questionnaire has demonstrable criterion-related, construct, and content validity. Reliability has been assessed by numerous independent researchers and it has demonstrable internal consistency and test-retest reliability.{ All component scales exceed 0.70 and the overall measure has a reliability in excess of 0.90.Specifically for self-efficacy results show r = .68, p < .01. While this is on the higher end, (.7) tends to be the standard minimum for research purposes. Nevertheless, both the construct validity and the psychometric properties of this test have been questioned.

Several other instruments purport to measure mental toughness, but research has called their validity into question. For example, the Performance Profile Inventory (PPI), developed by Loehr, used seven subscales to compute a mental toughness score. The Mental Toughness Inventory (MTI) developed by Middleton et al. measures mental toughness using twelve subscales and appears to show strong theoretical evidence for its formation. However, construct validation has only been performed with a narrow sample of athletes, leaving its psychometric properties up for debate.

== See also ==
- Hardiness – Ability to endure stress without negative health effects
- Psychological resilience – Ability to mentally cope with a crisis
- Resourcefulness – definition on Wiktionary
- Stress management – Techniques and therapies to manage stress
