= Salutogenesis =

Medical approach focusing on factors favouring health

Salutogenesis is the study of the origins (genesis) of health (salus) and focuses on factors that support human health and well-being, rather than on factors that cause disease (pathogenesis). More specifically, the "salutogenic model" was originally concerned with the relationship between health, stress, and coping through a study of Holocaust survivors. Despite going through the dramatic tragedy of the Holocaust, some survivors were able to thrive later in life. The discovery that there must be powerful health causing factors led to the development of salutogenesis. The term was coined by Aaron Antonovsky (1923–1994), a professor of medical sociology. The salutogenic question posed by Aaron Antonovsky is, "What makes people healthy?" He observed that stress is ubiquitous, but not all individuals have negative health outcomes in response to stress. Instead, some people achieve health despite their exposure to potentially disabling stress factors.

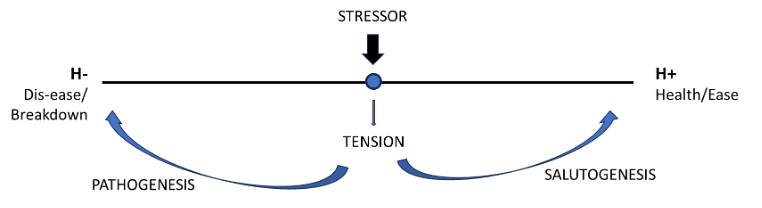
Health/ease–dis-ease continuum (Adapted from Lindström & Eriksson, 2010, p. 13)

Antonovsky identifies the dominant paradigm of Western medicine as pathogenic, which in turn leads to an understanding of health as dichotomous – one is either healthy or sick. For a salutogenic approach, the ease/dis-ease continuum, rather than the health-disease dichotomy is appropriate. Antonovsky identified four criteria to be used in determining a person's position on the continuum: pain, functional limitation, prognostic implication, and action implication; each ranging from “not-at-all” at the ease end to “severe/life-threatening/requiring intervention” at the dis-ease end. Later he wrote: “A continuum model, which sees each of us, at a given point in time, somewhere along a ‘health/dis-ease’ continuum is, I believe, a more powerful and more accurate conception of reality, one which opens the way for a strong theory of health promotion.

In his 1979 book, Health, Stress and Coping, Antonovsky described a variety of influences that led him to the question of how people survive, adapt, and overcome in the face of even the most punishing life-stress experiences. In his 1987 book, Unraveling the Mysteries of Health, he focused more specifically on a study of women and aging; he found that 29% of women who had survived Nazi concentration camps had positive emotional health, compared to 51% of a control group. His insight was that 29% of the survivors were not emotionally impaired by the stress. Antonovsky wrote: "this for me was the dramatic experience that consciously set me on the road to formulating what I came to call the 'salutogenic model." Antonovsky viewed his work as primarily addressed to the fields of health psychology, behavioral medicine, and the sociology of health. However, it has been applied in many different fields such as workplace, nursing, psychiatry, integrative medicine, and healthcare architecture.

The World Health Organization Health Promotion glossary of terms defines Salutogenesis as follows:

"Salutogenesis describes how social and individual resources help people to manage stress and to thrive. Salutogenesis focuses attention on the study of the origins (genesis) of health (salus) and of positive health outcomes—moving towards the positive end of an ease/dis-ease continuum—in contrast to the more usual study of the origins of disease and risk factors (pathogenesis). Salutogenesis emphasizes the importance of sense of coherence—an individual or collective orientation towards life as being comprehensible, manageable, and meaningful. In health promotion, the salutogenic approach focuses on strengthening resources and assets that help people to cope with adversarial life situations, and promote wellbeing and thriving."

== Salutogenic model of health ==
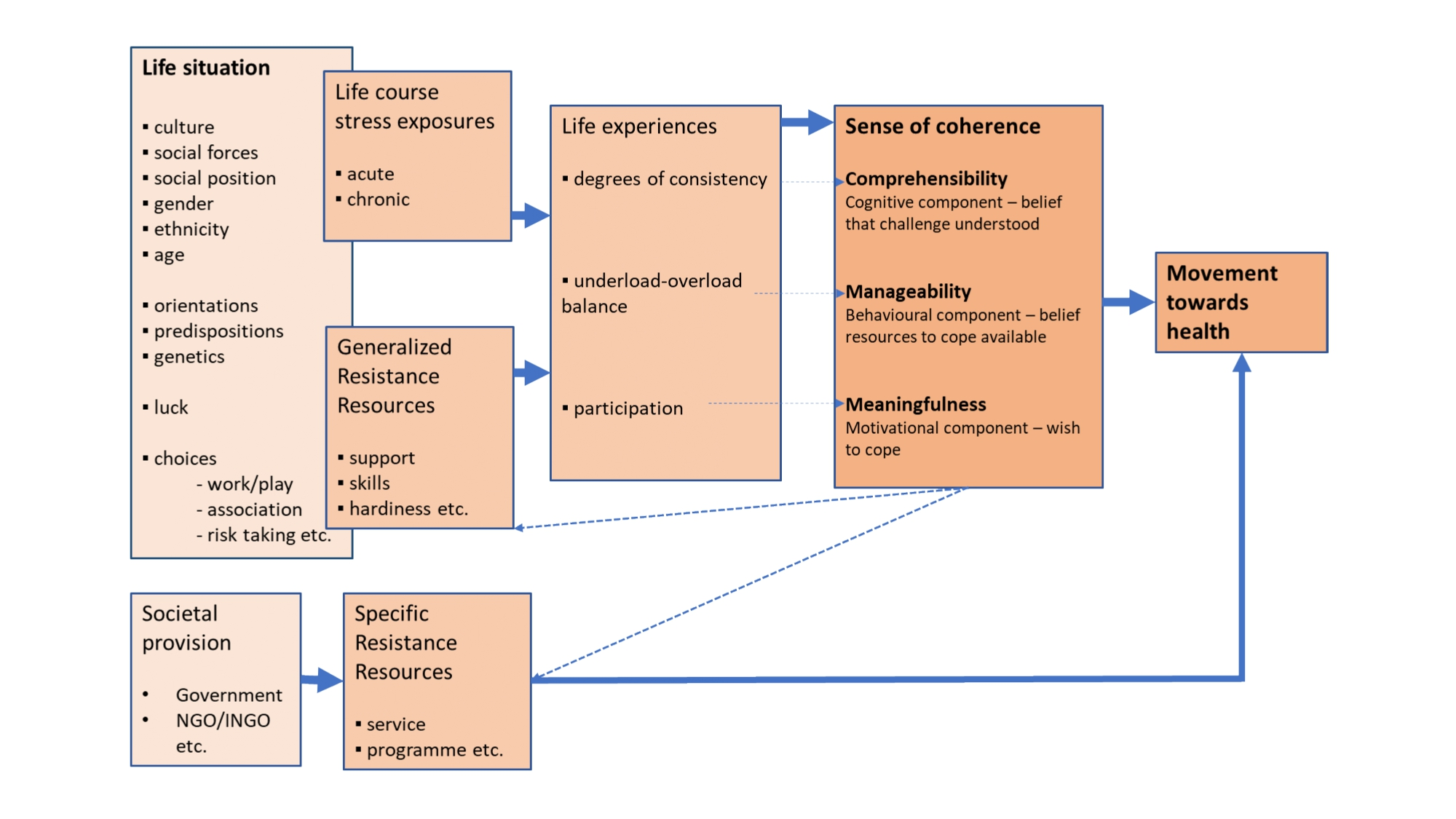
The Salutogenic Model of Health (2014, p. 2) based on Antonovsky (1996)

The Salutogenic Model of Health shows how the interrelationships between stressors and management of tension, generalised and specific resistance resources, life experiences and the sense of coherence (SOC) impact health status. In salutogenic theory, people continually battle with the effects of hardship and stressors. On the other hand, there are generalized resistance resources (GRRs) and specific resistance resources (SRRs), which are all of the resources that help a person cope and are effective in avoiding or combating a range of psychosocial stressors.

Generalized resistance resources enable individuals to make sense of and manage events. Antonovsky argued that over time, in response to positive experiences provided by successful use of different resources, an individual would develop an attitude that was "in itself the essential tool for coping". Examples of GRRs are money, ego-strength, or social support.

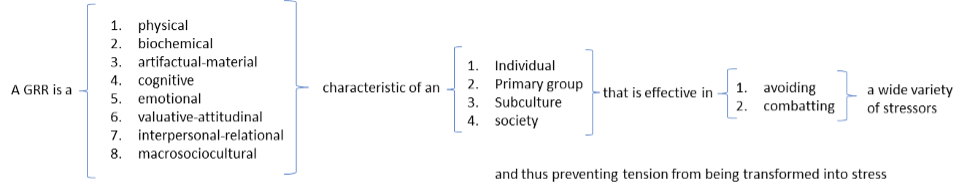
Mapping sentence definition of a GRR (Antonovsky, 1979, p. 103)

Specific resistance resources support coping “in particular situations of tension.” The relationship between GRRs and SRRs is that via the sense of coherence, GRRs enable one to recognize, pick up and use SRRs in ways that keep tension from turning into debilitating stress, assuming useful SRRs are available.

Generalized resource deficits will cause the coping mechanisms to fail whenever the sense of coherence is not robust to cope with the current situation. This causes illness and possibly even death. However, if the sense of coherence is high, a stressor will not necessarily be harmful. But it is the balance between generalized resource deficits and resources that determines whether a factor will be pathogenic, neutral, or salutary.

== Sense of coherence (SOC) ==
The "sense of coherence" is a theoretical formulation that provides a central explanation for the role of stress in human functioning. Antonovsky defined the sense of coherence as:

"a global orientation that expresses the extent to which one has a pervasive, enduring though dynamic feeling of confidence that (1) the stimuli deriving from one's internal and external environments in the course of living are structured, predictable and explicable; (2) the resources are available to one to meet the demands posed by these stimuli; and (3) these demands are challenges, worthy of investment and engagement."

In his formulation, the sense of coherence has three components:

- Comprehensibility: is the cognitive dimension of SOC and may be defined as a belief that things happen in an orderly and predictable fashion and a sense that you can understand events in your life and reasonably predict what will happen in the future.
- Manageability: is the behavioural dimension of SOC and may be defined as a belief that you have the skills or ability, the support, the help, or the resources necessary to take care of things, and that things are manageable and within your control.
- Meaningfulness: is the motivational dimension of SOC and may be defined as a belief that things in life are interesting and a source of satisfaction, that things are really worthwhile and that there is good reason or purpose to care about what happens.

Although all three components of the SOC are necessary, they are of unequal centrality. Meaningfulness seems the most crucial. Without this motivational component, strong comprehensibility and manageability are likely to be temporary. When a person is committed and caring, however, the way is open to gaining understanding and resources.

=== Mechanisms shaping SOC: Life experiences ===
How does the interaction of life situation, stressors and GRRs contribute to shaping and strengthening the SOC? Antonovsky answers that it is through the pattern of one's life experiences and how they determine the three dimensions of the SOC: “consistent experiences provide the basis for the comprehensibility component; a good load balance, for the manageability component; and, least clear of all, participation in shaping outcome, for the meaningfulness component.” Although chronic resources and chronic stressors (see section on Life situation), lay the foundation for the SOC, Antonovsky also states: “Paradoxically, then, a measure of unpredictable experiences – which call forth hitherto unknown resources – is essential for a strong sense of coherence”. Stressor life events thus strengthen the SOC through “potentiation”, demanding a re-orientation and use of new resources “thereby enriching one’s repertoire.”

Degrees of consistency: Antonovsky explains that humans’ need for stability is formed by consistent experiences. “But without rules, guidelines, criteria for setting priorities; without some significant thread of continuity between past, present and future; without some degree of harmony, we are lost. A strong SOC is linked to perceptions of stable values and rules that can be applied flexibly across situations, and which are constantly examined and developed by incorporating new experiences into the guiding set of rules.

Load balance: “Load experiences are those which make demands upon us to act, to mobilize resources for task performance.” Overload occurs when there are not enough resources to meet demand and underload occurs when “life is so structured that one’s skills, abilities, interests and potential have no channel for expression.” “Much as unused muscles atrophy, so do unused skills, capacities and potentialities.” Again, Antonovsky stresses that this varies across cultural settings. Load balance occurs when we believe we have resources at our disposal to meet the demand. Antonovsky notes that even when the demands are on an individual, the resources may be collectively provided – also described as “in the hands of legitimate others.”

Participation: Antonovsky points out that life experiences that shape meaningfulness are those that we have chosen to take part in, to engage with the problems posed by the experience. “When others decide everything for us – when they set the task, formulate the rules, and manage the outcome – and we have no say in the matter, we are reduced to objects. A world thus experienced as being indifferent to what we do comes to be seen as a world devoid of meaning.” Elsewhere, Antonovsky stresses that it is the ‘taking part’ that is significant (not the deciding or the controlling) and that the activity should be socially valued.

=== Measurement of the Sense of Coherence ===
The Orientation to Life Questionnaire, consisting of 29 items (known as SOC-29), was developed by Antonovsky using a facet theory to measure the sense of coherence. The scale includes items to measure the three components of SOC: comprehensibility (11 items), manageability (10 items), and meaningfulness (8 items). Responses are given on a semantic differential scale from 1 to 7, and after recoding reverse-scored items, they are summed to produce a total score ranging from 29 to 203. A shorter version, SOC-13, provides a total score between 13 and 91 points.

The SOC scales have been translated into over 50 languages and are considered applicable across cultures in assessing one's ability to maintain health despite stress. In addition to SOC-29 and SOC-13, which measure individual sense of coherence, other versions have been developed, such as scales to measure family coherence and an adaptation specifically for children.

== Collective and setting-specific approaches to Sense of Coherence ==
=== Antonovsky on Collective Sense of Coherence ===
In his 1987 book Unraveling the Mystery of Health, Antonovsky devotes a section to "The SOC as a group property". He agrees that it is possible to determine the structural properties of a collectivity and even, though more complex, the cultural properties of a group - such as norms and values - but he questions whether a collectivity can be characterised as having a common worldview. One way to determine group SOC might be to aggregate the SOC of individuals in the group or alternatively, to "investigate perceptions by individual members of the group of how the group sees the world". Antonovsky describes his growing discomfort concerning group SOC; the larger, more complex and diverse the collectivity becomes; there needs to be a "sense of group consciousness, of a subjectively identifiable collectivity" before there can be a group SOC. However, when there are collective stressors, "problems confronting the entire collectivity", and even in dealing with some individual stressors, group resources need to be utilised. "In the face of collective stressors, the strength of the group, rather than of the individual, SOC is often decisive in tension management". Later, he expresses difficulties with the concept: "to say that 'the collective thinks, feels, perceives' is, I believe, most problematic." However, elsewhere, he mentions that the SOC construct's "emphasis on resources and flexible coping tactics" is appropriate for application in studying collective stress processes and coping.

=== Sense of Family Coherence (SOFC) ===
Antonovsky and Sourani developed a 26 item scale to measure family sense of coherence (FSOC). Instead of focusing on the family's global orientation to life it focused on the spousal dyad's perception of the family coherence (family life as comprehensible, manageable and meaningful) and how this related to family adaptation in the face of a stressor. Sagy and Antonovsky, in a study on family sense of coherence and the retirement transition, returned to using SOC 29 (i.e. measuring individual SOC) among their measures. They acknowledge that retirement affects not only the person who retires, but also his/her family. Having measured individual SOC, they then considered four models to represent family SOC (FSOC): 1. Aggregation, where FSOC is calculated as the average of the sum of the individual SOCs; 2. Pathogenic, where the FSOC is represented by the weakest member with the lowest individual SOC; 3. Salutogenic, where FSOC is expressed by the SOC of the strongest member and, 4. A consensus model based on the assumption that agreement among family members improves coping. The salutogenic measure of the family was found in that study to be the best predictor of the retiree's health. Later on, Sagy developed a scale of sense of family coherence (SOFC) that examine one's cognitive perception of his or her family, of its worldview, and how it copes with the stresses of life. The scale, an elaborated version of the personal SOC, includes 12 items, was found as a predictor of adjustment to stress situations and mental health among children adolescents and adults. Note: Recently the term “family sense of coherence” has been replaced with “sense of family coherence (SOFC) in line with the terms SOCC and SONC.

=== Sense of Community Coherence (SOCC) ===
The Sense of Community Coherence (SOCC) has been developed as a concept that extends the individual-level Sense of Coherence (SOC) to the community level. It encompasses the perceptions of community comprehensibility, manageability, and meaningfulness, reflecting how members view their community as predictable, supportive, and meaningful. Research has primarily focused on the relationship between SOCC and well-being, mental health, and resilience to stressful events. For example, strong SOCC has been linked to increased resilience during crises and a decrease in unhealthy behaviours among community members. Recent studies have expanded the scope of SOCC to include its impact on intergroup relations, openness towards others, and reconciliation processes. These studies connect SOCC to broader social concepts like social identity, acculturation, conflict studies, and peace processes. They explore how a collective with a strong SOC perceives, feels, or behaves towards others, and whether a strong SOCC is associated with openness or rather with clinging to rigid in-group identities and less openness toward others. In different social contexts, particularly in conflict situations, SOCC has shown to influence group dynamics significantly. For instance, in religious communities in Israel, a strong SOCC was associated with greater acceptance of in-group narratives and rejection of out-group narratives, leading to a tendency for separation strategies in conflicts. This pattern suggests that while SOCC can be a salutogenic factor in promoting community resilience and mental health, it can also act as a barrier to positive intergroup relationships, particularly in intractable political, ethnic, or religious conflicts. In these situations, community members with a strong SOCC are more likely to adhere to their own collective narratives and reject those of out-groups, potentially perpetuating conflict and hindering reconciliation. The review of recent literature on SOCC demonstrates its dual role as both a salutogenic factor in fostering community resilience and mental health and as a potential barrier to positive intergroup relations. This complexity highlights the need for nuanced approaches in conflict resolution and community development, taking into account the impact of SOCC on group dynamics and intergroup relations. Understanding and addressing the ways in which strong SOCC contributes to conflict and separation, as well as exploring mediating factors and individual differences, could provide new insights for fostering openness and reconciliation in divided communities.

=== Sense of National Coherence (SONC) ===
The concept of Sense of National Coherence (SONC), as introduced by Sagy, is a salutogenic model applied at the national level, reflecting the tendency of a national group to perceive itself as comprehensible, meaningful, and manageable. This concept extends the individual-level 'sense of coherence' (SOC) to a collective dimension, integrating national identity and group experiences into its framework. SONC applied to understanding how national identity influences individual and collective well-being and attitudes, particularly in conflict situations. This concept has been particularly insightful in conflict studies, such as the Israeli-Palestinian conflict, where it's observed that a strong SONC can correlate with reduced openness to opposing narratives and can act as a barrier to reconciliation processes. Research indicates that heightened SONC, particularly in times of conflict or stress, can reinforce national narratives and decrease the willingness to legitimize the perspectives of "out-groups." This tendency has profound implications for conflict resolution and peace building efforts, highlighting the need for strategies that balance national coherence with openness and empathy towards different narratives. The role of SONC is not limited to political conflicts but also extends to social-political situations like pandemics, where it relates to trust in government and mental health outcomes. Understanding SONC can thus offer valuable insights into the interplay between national identity, social cohesion, and conflict dynamics, crucial for formulating effective interventions in divided societies. In essence, SONC is a double-edged sword: it provides psychological security and continuity within a group but can also contribute to intergroup tension and conflict when it becomes overly rigid or exclusive.

=== Work-related Sense of Coherence (Work-SoC) ===
The Ottawa Charter states that health is created and lived by people within their everyday life settings (i.e. where they learn, work, play, love). Based on the Salutogenic Model of Health, this raises the question in how far people experience a sense of coherence not only overall (“Global Orientation to Life”), but also specifically in interaction with these everyday settings. Already Antonovsky believed that the general SOC “can be modified, detrimentally or beneficially, by the nature of the working environment” and described work characteristics that are potentially related to sense of coherence, a workplace where individuals experience meaningfulness, manageability, and comprehensibility. Following this thought, Bauer and Jenny suggested the concept of “Work-related Sense of Coherence” (Work-SoC) defined as the perceived comprehensibility, manageability, and meaningful- ness of an individual's current work situation. Work-SoC is an interactive concept influenced by and influencing both the underlying, general SoC, as well as the perception and handling of work-related demands and resources. The nine-item German Work-SoC scale has been translated into English, Norwegian, Finnish, French, Italian, Spanish, Dutch, Japanese, Chinese, and Czech. Empirically, Work-SoC has been shown to be related to both job-demands-resources and general SoC, as well as to both negative and positive work-related health outcomes. Salutogenics perspectives are also considered in the design of offices.

== Current developments of the theory and research on Salutogenesis ==
Immediately after the early death of Aaron Antonovsky in 1994, his work was primarily adopted and promoted in the Scandinavian countries by Bengt Lindström from the Nordic School of Public Health who had been in close exchange with Antonovsky in the previous years. Since 1996, Bengt Lindström regularly taught courses on health promotion and salutogenesis at the Nordic School and introduced it as a regular topic into the Nordic Health Promotion Research Conferences since. Between 2008 and 2015, he organized international research seminars on Salutogenesis. In 2010, Lindström and Eriksson published The Hitchhiker's Guide to Salutogenesis: Salutogenic Pathways to Health Promotion, currently available in English, Spanish, Catalan, French, Norwegian, Italian, German, and Polish. In 2007, Bengt Lindström together with Maurice Mittelmark initiated the “Global Working Group on Salutogenesis” of the “International Union of Health Promotion and Education” which he chaired until 2017. This group initiated the first and second edition of the Handbook of Salutogenesis published open access by Springer. Both books show key advancements of the field and how Salutogenesis has been applied to diverse settings and topics.

In 2017, Georg Bauer founded the Center of Salutogenesis at the University of Zurich and took over the lead of the Global Working Group. In the same year, the Global Working Group founded the Society for Theory and Research on Salutogenesis STARS, hosted by the Center of Salutogenesis. The Society aims to advance and promote the science of salutogenesis. Together with the Global Working Group, it organizes regular, International Conferences on Salutogenesis.

== See also ==
- Social determinants of health – Economic and social conditions that influence differences in health status
- Logotherapy – Psychotherapeutic approach
- Public health – Promoting health through informed choices
- The Peckham Experiment – Social experiment in public health
- Pathogenesis – Process by which a disease or disorder develops
- Positive psychology – Approach of psychological scientific study
