= Ergophobia =

Fear of work

- Specialty: Psychology

Ergophobia (also referred to as ergasiophobia or ponophobia) is described as an extreme and debilitating fear associated with work (manual labor, non-manual labor, etc.), a fear of finding or losing employment, or fear of specific tasks in the workplace. The term ergophobia comes from the Greek "ergon" (work) and "phobos" (fear).

Ergophobia is not specifically defined in the DSM-5. Criteria can be accounted for under the category of "Other" specific phobia 300.29 (F40.298).

Features of ergophobia are often consistent with social phobia or performance anxiety, specifically irrational anxiety about the work and the workplace environment. This can include the fear of failing at assigned tasks, public speaking at the workplace, performance anxiety, fear of socialising with co-workers, and fear of emotional, psychological and/or physical injuries at work.

== Phobias ==
A phobia is a psychological condition in which an individual has a persisting fear of a situation or object that is disproportionate to the threat they actually pose. This condition stems from one's need to constantly be alert and avoid the source of the phobia that results in of psychological distress. Phobias can be specific to a certain stimulus or general to social situations. The most effective treatment for phobias is exposure therapy.

Phobias are often associated with a range of other mental health disorders: depressive disorder, anxiety disorder, bipolar disorders, substance abuse and personality disorders. There is a potential connection between executive dysfunction and work-related anxiety.

== Symptoms ==
Ergophobia has both physical and psychological symptoms associated with fear and avoidance of the work environment. A study focused on burnout among teachers concluded that those experiencing ergophobia performed significantly worse on a physical health index compared to their colleagues. Physical symptoms of ergophobia can include rapid heart rate, dry mouth, excessive sweating, general uneasiness, and panic attacks. Ergophobia is also described as causing impairment at work including inability to meet work requirements, difficulty keeping a job, avoidance of taking on additional work responsibility, ruminating on negative work situation or challenges at work, and disengagement from the workplace.

== History and measurement ==
Ergophobia is a controversial concept, and in the past has been dismissed as laziness. William Upson defined it as "the art of laziness" and "morbid fear or hatred of work". Ergophobia was mentioned by a hospital in New Jersey in the 1860s.

Ergophobia is considered by some to be a corollary of occupational burnout, which is thought to be the result of long-term unresolvable job stress. The term "burnout" did not come to be used with regularity until the 1970s in the United States. Freudenberger, for example, used it to describe the phenomenon of physical and emotional exhaustion, with associated negative attitudes arising from intense interactions when working with people. Burnout appears to be more common in occupations include health care and mental health care professionals, social welfare workers, lawyers, and business organization employees.

Although there is no formal diagnosis procedure for ergophobia or burnout, the Maslach Burnout Inventory – a series of introspective occupational burnout questions, is used together with the Areas of Worklife Survey (AWS) to assess levels of burnout. These tests measure emotional burnout, depersonalization, and personal achievements, and are suitable for both individual and group assessment.

== Similar syndromes ==
A similar syndrome as ergophobia is seen in generalized anxiety disorder (GAD), where one experiences uncontrollably elevated levels of anxiety and worries over varying issues and events. As with phobias, individuals with GAD experience anxiety that is disproportionate to the actual threat a situation poses. Adults with GAD can feel stressed by work-related concerns regarding everyday tasks, evaluations, and presentations.

Social anxiety disorder, also known as social phobia, is characterized by feelings of anxiety induced by social interactions or situations, in which the individual may be scrutinized or rejected by others. This anxiety is easily exacerbated by work-related situations such as presentations, professional and friendly social interactions at the workplace.

Additionally, "Other specified Anxiety Disorder" also causes distress and significant levels of anxiety, but not in a manner that fully embodies the diagnostic symptoms of anxiety disorders. This disorder greatly influences performance in social, occupational or other important situations, therefore may seem similar to Ergophobia or occupational burnout.

== In culture ==
The number of ergophobia cases increases with the number of people working in an ergophobia conducting environment, regardless of changes in the rates reported of ergophobia itself. The changing circumstances of employer-employee relations has also been significantly altered by this evolution to a service-based economy. Performance appraisal systems are now a popular tool within organizations to enhance employee commitment and productivity. Such systems can exacerbate emotional exhaustion among employees and subsequently feelings of burnout or ergophobia.

Proliferation of mental health awareness discourses in popular Western culture may lead to mis- or overdiagnosis of mental illness. As the fear of work itself is such a general catchall term, many may mistakenly believe they suffer from ergophobia when in fact, they are simply dealing with occupational stress, or are afflicted by other mental health issues such as Generalized Anxiety Disorder or social anxiety disorder.

== See also ==
- Critique of work
- Refusal of work
- Workism
