= Susan Jackson =

Susan Jackson may refer to:

- Susan Jackson (figure skater) (born 1965), British figure skater
- Susan Jackson (gymnast) (born 1987), American artistic gymnast
- Susan Jackson (sport shooter) (born 1973), British sport shooter
- Susan E. Jackson, American researcher on occupational burnout

== See also ==
- Suzanne Jackson (disambiguation)
