= Occupational burnout =

Type of occupational stress

- Other names: Burn-out, exhaustion disorder, neurasthenia
- A person experiencing psychological stress
- Specialty: Psychology
- Symptoms: Emotional exhaustion, depersonalization, reduced personal accomplishment, fatigue
- Differential diagnosis: Major depressive disorder

The ICD-11 of the World Health Organization (WHO) describes occupational burnout as a work-related phenomenon resulting from chronic workplace stress that has not been successfully managed. According to the WHO, symptoms include "feelings of energy depletion or exhaustion; increased mental distance from one's job, or feelings of negativism or cynicism related to one's job; and reduced professional efficacy".

Occupational burnout is classified as an occupational phenomenon but is not recognized by the WHO as a medical or psychiatric condition. Social psychologist Christina Maslach and colleagues made clear that burnout does not constitute "a single, one-dimensional phenomenon". However, national health bodies in some European countries do recognize it as such, and it is also independently recognized by some health practitioners. Nevertheless, a body of evidence suggests that what is termed burnout is a depressive condition, that is to say, indistinct from, and overlaps with, depression.

== History ==
Kaschka, Korczak, and Broich (2011) advanced the view that an early description of burnout is in Exodus 18:17–18. The New International Version has Moses' father-in-law saying to him, "What you are doing is not good. You and these people who come to you will only wear yourselves out. The work is too heavy for you; you cannot handle it alone." Gordon Parker suggested that the ancient European concept of acedia refers to burnout and not depression as many others believe.

By 1834, the German concept of Berufskrankheiten (occupational diseases) had become established. The concept reflected adverse work-related effects on mental and physical health. In 1869, New York neurologist George Beard used the term "neurasthenia" to describe a very broad condition caused by the exhaustion of the nervous system, which he argued was to be found in "civilized, intellectual communities". The concept soon became popular, and many in the United States believed themselves to suffer from it. Some came to call it "Americanitis". Beard broadened the potential symptoms of neurasthenia such that the disorder could be the source of almost any symptom or behaviour. Don R. Lipsitt would later wonder if the term "burnout" was similarly too broadly defined to be useful. In 2017 the Dutch psychologist Wilmar Schaufeli pointed out similarities between Beard's concept of neurasthenia and that of the contemporary concept of occupational burnout. The rest cure was a commonly prescribed treatment for neurasthenia in the United States, particularly for women. The American doctor Silas Weir Mitchell often prescribed this treatment. Other treatments included hypnosis, Paul Charles Dubois's cognitive behavioural therapy (this is distinct from and devised much earlier than Aaron Beck's cognitive behavioral therapy), and Otto Binswanger's life normalisation therapy.

In 1888, the English neurologist William Gowers coined the term occupation neurosis to describe cramps experienced by writers and pianists (repetitive strain injury), translating the German concept of Beschäftigungsneurosen (occupational diseases affecting the nerves). The related term occupational neurosis came to include a wide range of work-caused anxieties and other mental problems. By the late 1930s, American health professionals had become widely acquainted with the condition. It became known as Berufsneurose in German. From 1915, the Japanese psychiatrist Shoma Morita developed Morita therapy to treat neurasthenia. He had come to have a different understanding of the condition than Beard, preferring to call it shinkeishitsui; he published two books about the condition.

In 1957, Swiss psychiatrist Paul Kielholz coined the term Erschöpfungsdepression [exhaustion-depression]. The concept was one of a number of new depression-subtypes that gained traction in France and Germany during the 1960s. In 1961, British author Graham Greene published the novel A Burnt-Out Case, the story of an architect who became disenchanted with the fame his achievements garnered for him and volunteered to work at a leper colony in the Congo. In 1965, Kielholz publicised therapy for Erschöpfungsdepression in the German-speaking world through his book Diagnose und Therapie der Depressionen für den Praktiker [Diagnosis and Treatment of Depression for the Practitioner]. His work inspired further writing on the topic by German psychiatrist Volker Faust.

In 1968, the second edition of the American Psychiatric Association's (APA) Diagnostic and Statistical Manual (DSM-II) replaced "psychophysiologic nervous system reaction" with the condition neurasthenic neurosis (neurasthenia). This condition was "characterized by complaints of chronic weakness, easy fatigability, and sometimes exhaustion". Another condition added to this edition was the similar asthenic personality, which was "characterized by easy fatigability, low energy level, lack of enthusiasm, marked incapacity for enjoyment, and oversensitivity to physical and emotional stress".

In 1969, American prison official Harold B Bradley used the term burnout in a criminology paper to describe the fatigued staff at a centre for treating young adult offenders. Bradley's article has been cited as the first known academic paper to use the term.

In 1974, Herbert Freudenberger, a German-born American clinical psychologist, used the term "burn-out" in his academic paper "Staff Burn-Out". The paper was based on his qualitative observations of the volunteer staff (including himself) at a free clinic for drug addicts. He characterized burnout by a set of symptoms that includes exhaustion resulting from work's excessive demands. Other symptoms he identified were headaches, sleeplessness, "quickness to anger", and closed thinking. He observed that the burned-out worker "looks, acts, and seems depressed". After the publication of Freudenberger's paper, interest in the concept grew.

The American psychologist Christina Maslach described burnout in a 1976 magazine article as reflecting the impact of interpersonal stress on human service workers (e.g., social workers, psychiatrists, poverty lawyers, etc.). The impact manifested itself in symptoms such as fatigue, quickness to anger, and cynical attitudes toward the people the service workers were supposed to help. Also in 1976, Israeli-American psychologist Ayala Pines and American psychologist Elliot Aronson, using group workshops, began to treat people having symptoms of burnout. Pines collaborated with Maslach in writing essentially data-free papers about burnout in individuals who worked in day care centers and mental health facilities.

In 1980, the DSM-III was released. It abolished the concepts of neurasthenia and asthenic personality, both with the explanation "This DSM-II category was rarely used." Neither was directly replaced. Also in 1980, American psychologist Cary Cherniss published the book Staff Burnout: Job Stress in the Human Services.

In 1981, Maslach and fellow American psychologist Susan E. Jackson published an instrument for assessing occupational burnout, the Maslach Burnout Inventory (MBI). It was the first such instrument of its kind, and soon became the most widely used measure of occupational burnout. The two researchers described occupational burnout in terms of emotional exhaustion, depersonalization (feeling low-empathy towards other people in an occupational setting), and reduced feelings of work-related accomplishment. In 1988, Pines and Aronson wrote the popular book Career Burnout: Causes and Cures, an updated version of a book they had published in April 1981 with American psychologist Ditsa Kafry. They found that "marriage burnout" was just as prevalent as "job burnout".

The WHO's ICD-10 (1994) removed the diagnosis of asthenic personality; the WHO, however, continued to include neurasthenia (F48.0). In 1998, Swedish psychiatrists Marie Åsberg and Åke Nygren investigated a surge of depression-related health insurance claims in their country. They found that the symptoms of many cases did not match the typical presentation of depression. Complaints like fatigue and decreased cognitive ability dominated, and many believed their working conditions to be the cause.

In 2003, the American psychiatrists Philip M. Liu and David A. Van Liew advanced the view that the concept of burnout is largely bereft of meaning and has often come to refer to "stress-induced unhappiness" with one's job. They also noted that burnout can mean "everything from fatigue to a major depression and now seems to have become an alternative word for depression but with less serious significance" (p. 434).

In 2005, the Swedish Board of Health and Welfare created the national ICD condition of "exhaustion disorder" (F43.8A) as a specific "Other reactions to severe stress" (F43.8). Treatment programs followed. In December 2007, the Swiss Expert Network on Burnout (SEB) was established. It has since held a number of symposia, and published recommendations for treating burnout.

In 2015, French psychologist Renzo Bianchi and his colleagues published a literature review on the burnout–depression overlap (based on 92 studies) and concluded that the studies fail to demonstrate the nosological distinctiveness of the burnout phenomenon. A number of papers followed that showed the overlap of burnout with depression, suggesting that burnout is a depressive condition.

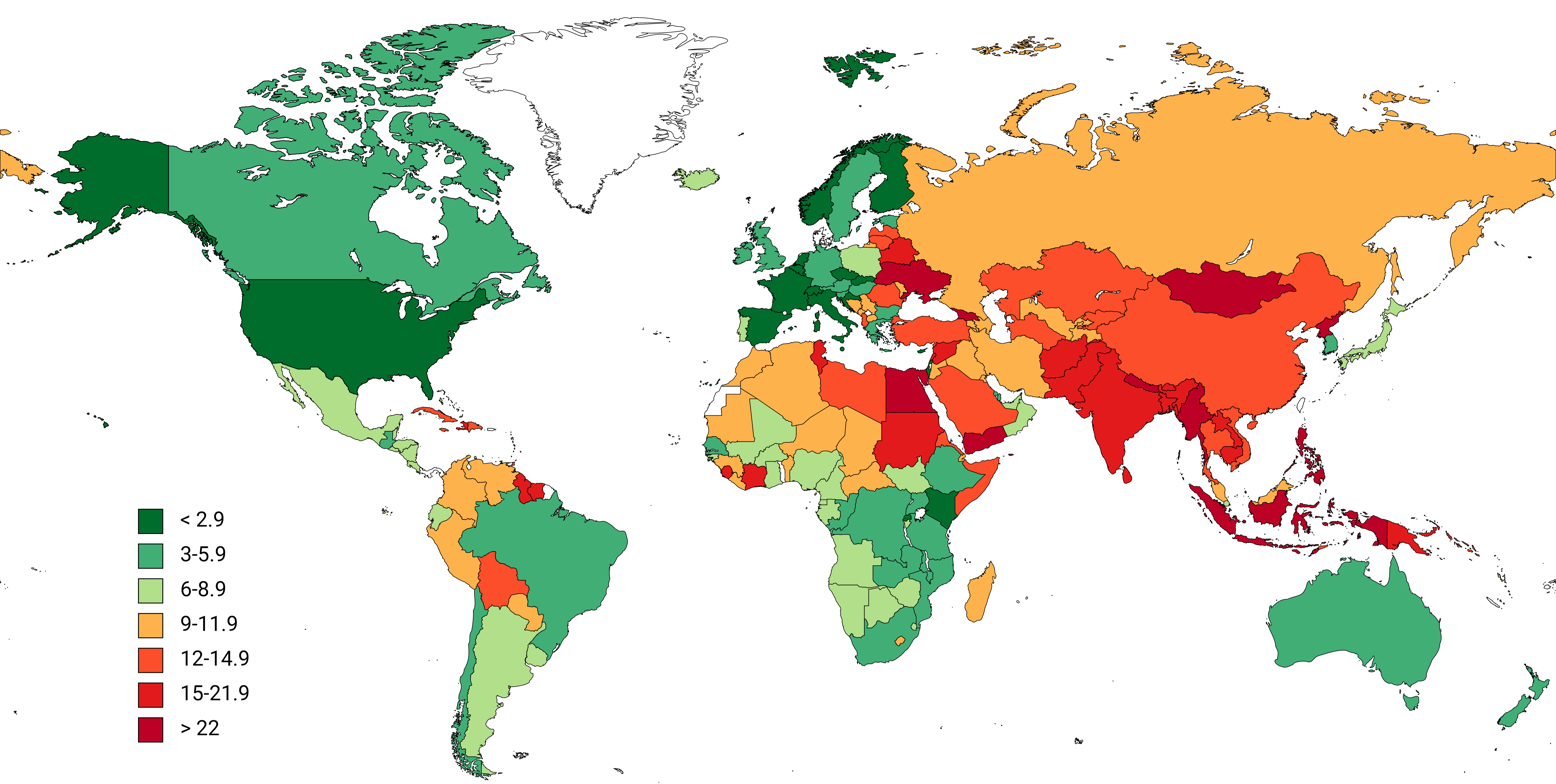
Deaths due to long working hours per 100,000 people (15+), joint study conducted by World Health Organization and International Labour Organization in 2016.

Also in 2015, the WHO adopted a new conceptualization of "occupational burnout". The conceptualization was consistent with Maslach's. However, occupational burnout was "not itself classified by the WHO as a medical or psychiatric condition or mental disorder". As of 2017, nine European countries (Denmark, Estonia, France, Hungary, Latvia, Netherlands, Portugal, and Slovakia) legally recognized the burnout syndrome as an occupational disorder, for example, by awarding workers' compensation payments to affected people.

In 2020, the Occupational Depression Inventory was published and was considered to be a potential replacement for burnout scales such as the MBI.

The WHO's ICD-11 began official use in 2022. Within this categorisation, the concept of neurasthenia became part of the new condition known as "bodily distress disorder" (6C20). The WHO also modified their definition of burnout that year. This new edition additionally saw the WHO abolish nation-defined conditions, leading to Sweden's planned end to its specific recognition of exhaustion disorder in 2028.

== Diagnosis ==
The two main classification systems for psychiatric disorders are the APA's Diagnostic and Statistical Manual of Mental Disorders (DSM, used in North America and elsewhere) and the WHO's International Classification of Diseases (ICD, used in Europe and elsewhere). Burnout is not recognized as a distinct mental disorder in the DSM-5 (published in 2013). Its definitions for Adjustment Disorders, and Unspecified Trauma- and Stressor-Related Disorder have been said that in some cases reflect the condition. The 2022 update of the DSM, the DSM-5-TR, did not include burnout.

The ICD-10 (1994–2021) classification "burn-out" as a type of non-medical life-management difficulty under code Z73.0. It was considered to be one of the "factors influencing health status and contact with health services" and "should not be used" for "primary mortality coding". It was also considered one of the "problems related to life-management difficulty". The condition is further defined as being a "state of vital exhaustion", which historically had been called neurasthenia. The ICD-10 also contained a medical condition category of "F43.8 Other reactions to severe stress".

In 2003, Liu and van Liew wrote that "the term burnout is used so frequently that it has lost much of its original meaning. As originally used, burnout meant a mild degree of stress-induced unhappiness. The solutions ranged from a vacation to a sabbatical. Ultimately, it was used to describe everything from fatigue to a major depression and now seems to have become an alternative word for depression, but with a less serious significance" (p. 434). The authors equated burnout with adjustment disorder with depressed mood.

By 2003, the Royal Dutch Medical Association had defined burnout as a subtype of adjustment disorder as part of the ICD-10 system. In the Netherlands, overspannenheid (overstrain) is a condition that leads to burnout. In that country, burnout is included in handbooks and medical staff are trained in its diagnosis and treatment. A reform of Dutch health insurance programs resulted in adjustment disorder treatment being removed from the compulsory basic package in 2012. Practitioners were told that more serious cases of the condition may qualify for classification as depression or anxiety disorder.

A 2013 French study bearing on diagnosis compared the depressive symptom profiles of 46 depressed outpatients, an equal number of individuals, in this case teachers, with clinical burnout, and more than 400 burnout-free teachers. The depressive symptom profiles of the depressed patients and the burnt-out teachers were highly similar but both groups had similarly and significantly higher levels of depressive symptoms than that of the teachers without clinical burnout.

Several European countries have legally recognized burnout in some way, such as by providing workers' compensation payments. Legal recognition for financial purposes, however, is not the same as medical recognition as a discrete disease. If, after treatment, a person with burnout continues to have persistent physical symptoms triggered by the condition, in Iceland the individual may be considered to have "somatic symptom disorder" (DSM-5) or "bodily distress disorder" (ICD-11).

Rotenstein et al. (2018) in a review of 182 studies of physician burnout identified 142 different definitions of burnout, underlining the great heterogeneity in diagnostic criteria for the condition. When they limited themselves to studies that used the canonical Maslach Burnout Inventory, the study team found 47 distinct definitions of burnout. Marked differences among researchers' conceptualizations of what constitutes burnout have underlined the absence of a consensus definition.

A new version of the ICD, ICD-11, was released in June 2018, for first use in January 2022. The new version has an entry coded and titled "QD85 Burn-out". The ICD-11 describes the condition as follows:

Burn-out is a syndrome conceptualized as resulting from chronic workplace stress that has not been successfully managed. It is characterized by three dimensions: 1) feelings of energy depletion or exhaustion; 2) increased mental distance from one's job, or feelings of negativism or cynicism related to one's job; and 3) reduced professional efficacy. Burn-out refers specifically to phenomena in the occupational context and should not be applied to describe experiences in other areas of life.

This condition is classified under "Problems associated with employment or unemployment" in the section on "Factors influencing health status or contact with health services". The section is devoted to reasons other than recognized diseases or health conditions for which people contact health services. In a statement made in May 2019, the WHO said "Burn-out is included in the 11th Revision of the International Classification of Diseases (ICD-11) as an occupational phenomenon. It is not classified as a medical condition." The ICD-11 also has the medical condition "6B4Y Other specified disorders specifically associated with stress", which is the equivalent of the ICD-10's F43.8.

Further detail about the varied ways clinicians and others used the then-current ICD and DSM classifications with burnout was published by Dutch psychologist Arno Van Dam in 2021.

The US government's National Institutes of Health includes the condition as "psychological burnout" in its index of the National Library of Medicine, and provides a number of synonyms. It defines the condition as "An excessive reaction to stress caused by one's environment that may be characterized by feelings of emotional and physical exhaustion, coupled with a sense of frustration and failure". SNOMED CT includes the term "burnout" as a synonym for its defined condition of "Physical AND emotional exhaustion state", which is a subtype of anxiety disorder. The Diseases Database defines the condition as "professional burnout".

== Instruments used to assess burnout symptoms ==
A number of instruments have been developed to assess work-related burnout. The National Academy of Medicine has created an inventory of burnout scales. The core of all of the abovementioned conceptualizations, including that of Freudenberger, is exhaustion.

=== Maslach Burnout Inventory ===
In 1981, Maslach and Jackson published the first widely used instrument for assessing burnout, the Maslach Burnout Inventory (MBI). It remains by far the most commonly used instrument to assess the condition. Consistent with Maslach's conceptualization, the MBI operationalizes burnout as a three-dimensional syndrome consisting of emotional exhaustion, depersonalization (an unfeeling and impersonal response toward recipients of one's service, care, treatment, or instruction), (Note: The term "depersonalization" as used by Maslach and Jackson should not be confused with the same term used in psychiatry and clinical psychology as a hallmark of dissociative disorder.) and reduced personal accomplishment. The MBI originally focused on human service professionals (e.g., teachers, social workers). Since that time, the MBI has been used for a wider variety of workers (e.g., healthcare workers). The instrument or its variants are now employed with job incumbents working in many other occupations.

The MBI is proprietary. Its cost may be a disincentive that discourages graduate students and young assistant professors from using it. There are other conceptualizations of burnout that differ from the conceptualization suggested by Maslach and adopted by the WHO.

=== Oldenburg Burnout Inventory ===
In 1999, Demerouti and Bakker, with their Oldenburg Burnout Inventory (OLBI), conceptualized burnout in terms of exhaustion and disengagement, linking their conceptualization to the job demands–resources model.

=== Copenhagen Burnout Inventory ===
In 2005, Kristensen et al. released the public domain Copenhagen Burnout Inventory (CBI). They argued that the definition of burnout should be limited to the fatigue/exhaustion continuum.

=== Shirom-Melamed Burnout Measure ===
In 2006, Shirom and Melamed with their Shirom-Melamed Burnout Measure (SMBM) conceptualized burnout in terms of physical exhaustion, cognitive weariness, and emotional exhaustion. The SMBM's emotional exhaustion subscale more clearly embodies Maslach's concept of depersonalization than her concept of emotional exhaustion. This measure has seen some use in Sweden.

=== Karolinska Exhaustion Disorder Scale ===
In 2014, Besèr et al. published the Karolinska Exhaustion Disorder Scale (KEDS), which is used mainly in Sweden. It was designed to measure the symptoms defined by the ICD-10-SE's category for exhaustion disorder. The authors believed that those with the disorder were often initially depressed, but that this soon passed. The core symptoms of the disorder were deemed to be "exhaustion, cognitive problems, sleep disturbance". The authors also believed that the condition was clearly differentiated from both depression and anxiety.

=== Sydney Burnout Measure ===
In 2021, Gordon Parker et al. published the Sydney Burnout Measure (SBM), an instrument that "captures domains of exhaustion, cognitive impairment, loss of empathy, withdrawal and insularity, and impaired work performance, as well as several anxiety, depression and irritability symptoms".

=== Lesser known burnout scales ===
There are other conceptualizations of burnout embodied in other instruments, including the Hamburg Burnout Inventory, the Burnout Assessment Tool, the Burnout Measure, and the Meier Burnout Assessment.

=== Other instruments that measure burnout ===
In 1999, Wilmar Schaufeli and Arnold Bakker published the Utrecht Work Engagement Scale (UWES), an instrument that uses a conceptualisation similar to that of the MBI. However the UWES measures vigour, dedication and absorption, positive counterparts (or polar opposites) of the high-burnout endpoints of the MBI's subscales.

In 2010, researchers at the Mayo Clinic used portions of the MBI, along with other comprehensive assessments, to develop the Well-Being Index, a nine-item self-assessment tool designed to measure burnout and other dimensions of distress in healthcare workers specifically. The measure has mainly been used in the United States.

The Occupational Depression Inventory (ODI) was published in 2020. The measure covers the nine main symptoms of depression that individuals ascribe to their jobs and quantifies the severity of those work-attributed symptoms. The ODI also generates provisional diagnoses of job-ascribed depression. The instrument exhibits robust psychometric properties. The ODI is the only instrument that assesses work-related suicidal thoughts, a particularly important symptom calling for immediate attention. Available evidence indicates that burnout scales have very high correlations with the ODI, correlations that cannot be explained by item content overlap, suggesting that the ODI is a suitable replacement for burnout scales like the MBI.

== Different types of burnout ==
Burnout in certain groups of people has received focused attention.

=== Caregiver burnout ===
Burnout is thought to affect caregivers. In the ICD-11, in the description for code QF27 "Difficulty or need for assistance at home and no other household member able to render care" the term "caregiver burnout" is given as a synonym.

=== Spouse burnout ===
Aylala Malach-Pines (who also published as Ayala Pines) advanced the view that burnout can occur in connection to the spousal role.

=== Academic burnout ===
Academic burnout refers to a form of burnout experienced by university students as a result of prolonged academic stress and demands. It is characterized by emotional exhaustion, reduced motivation toward academic tasks, and a decreased sense of competence in one's studies. It is considered an adaptation of occupational burnout within an educational context

=== Teacher burnout ===
Burnout in teachers represents a type of occupational burnout.

=== Athlete burnout ===
Athlete burnout, which burdens athletes' mental health and well-being, can, in extreme cases, lead to athletes terminating their participation in a physical activity they once enjoyed.

=== Autistic burnout ===
Autistic people are known to experience a state of mental, emotional, or physical exhaustion referred to as autistic burnout because of the general stress involved in masking of autistic traits and behavior and the strains associated with living in an unaccommodating environment. Autistic burnout is considered to be distinct from occupational burnout in both etiology and presentation.

The concept of autistic burnout became much more common on Twitter in 2017–18, and subsequently attracted more academic research. The establishing paper on the subject was published by American systems scientist Dora Raymaker et al. in June 2020.

== Relationship with other conditions ==
Liu and van Liew advanced the view that the concept of burnout has been overused and "lost much of its original meaning". They wrote that originally the term referred to a mild degree of unhappiness caused by job stress. The remedies include a vacation. They suggested that the contemporary use of the term burnout can refer to conditions that range from fatigue to major depression. They wrote that the term has served as a euphemism for depression.

A body of evidence indicates that burnout is etiologically, clinically, and nosologically similar to depression. In a study that directly compared depressive symptoms in burned out workers and clinically depressed patients, no diagnostically significant differences were found between the two groups; burned out workers reported as many depressive symptoms as clinically depressed patients. Moreover, a study by Bianchi et al. (2014) showed that about 90% of workers with very high scores on the MBI meet diagnostic criteria for depression. The view that burnout is a depressive phenomenon has found support. Some authors have recommended that the nosological concept of burnout be revised or even abandoned entirely given that it is not a distinct disorder and that there is little agreement on burnout's diagnostic criteria. A newer generation of studies indicates that burnout, particularly its exhaustion dimension, problematically overlaps with depression; these studies have relied on more sophisticated statistical techniques, for example, exploratory structural equation modeling (ESEM) bifactor analysis, than earlier studies of the topic. The advantage of ESEM bifactor analysis, which combines the best features of exploratory and confirmatory factor analysis, is that it provides a granular look at item-construct relationships, without falling into traps earlier burnout researchers fell into.

Maslach advanced the idea that burnout should not be viewed as a depressive condition. Recent evidence, based on factor-analytic and meta-analytic findings, calls into question this supposition. Burnout is also now often seen as involving the full array of depressive symptoms (e.g., low mood, cognitive alterations, sleep disturbance).

=== Endocrine findings ===
Kakiashvili et al. argued that although burnout and depression have overlapping symptoms, endocrine evidence suggests that the disorders' biological bases are different. They argued that antidepressants should not be used by people with burnout because the medications can make the underlying hypothalamic–pituitary–adrenal axis dysfunction worse. Others have found Kakiashvili et al.'s argument specious.

Test	Major depressive disorder (typically melancholic depression)	Atypical depression	PTSD	Burnout
Cortisol awakening response	↑	↓	↓	↓
Adrenocorticotropic hormone (ACTH)	↑	or ↓	or ↓	or ↓ or ↑
Dehydroepiandrosterone sulphate (DHEA-S)	↓		↑ or ↓	↑
Low dose dexamethasone suppression test effect on cortisol	no suppression			hypersuppression

Despite its name, depression with atypical features, which is seen in the above table, is not a rare form of depression. The cortisol profile in atypical depression, in contrast to that of melancholic depression, is similar to the cortisol profile found in burnout. Commentators advanced the view that burnout differs from depression because the cortisol profile of burnout differs from that of melancholic depression; however, as the above table indicates, burnout's cortisol profile is similar to that of atypical depression.

== Risk factors ==
Evidence suggests that the etiology of burnout is multifactorial, with personality factors playing an important, long-overlooked role. The researchers identified the prominent personality factor neuroticism in the development of burnout. Cognitive dispositional factors implicated in depression have also been found to be implicated in burnout.

Burnout is thought to occur when there is a mismatch between the job and the worker. A common type of mismatch is work overload. For example, work overload can occur when a worker survives a round of layoffs, but after the layoffs the worker is doing too much with too few resources. In the context of downsizing, an organization does not ordinarily narrow its goals, although fewer employees are available to meet those goals. The research on downsizing indicates that it has more destructive effects on the health of the workers who survive the layoffs than just its effect on burnout; these health effects include increased levels of sickness and greater risk of mortality.

The job demands–resources model has implications for burnout, as measured by the Oldenburg Burnout Inventory (OLBI). Physical and psychological job demands were concurrently associated with the exhaustion, as measured by the OLBI. Lack of job resources was associated with the disengagement component of the OLBI. Maslach and her colleagues (2001) identified six risk factors for burnout: mismatch in workload, mismatch in control, lack of appropriate awards, loss of a sense of positive connection with others in the workplace, perceived lack of fairness, and conflict between values.

Although job stress has long been viewed as the main determinant of burnout, recent meta-analytic findings indicate that job stress is at best a weak predictor of burnout. These findings question one of the most central assumptions of burnout research. It has long been known that the personality dimension neuroticism is a strong predictor of burnout. In addition to broad these personality traits research suggests that elevated symptoms of attention-deficit/hyperactivity disorder (ADHD) may represent an additional individual vulnerability factor for burnout. ADHD-related difficulties may increase susceptibility to stress in cognitively demanding work environments.

In a systematic literature review in 2014, the Swedish Agency for Health Technology Assessment and Assessment of Social Services (SBU) found that a number of work environment factors could affect the risk of developing exhaustion disorder or depressive symptoms:

- People who experience a work situation with little opportunity to influence, in combination with too high demands, develop more depressive symptoms.
- People who experience a lack of compassionate support in the work environment develop more symptoms of depression and exhaustion disorder than others. Those who experience bullying or conflict in their work develop more depressive symptoms than others, but it is not possible to determine whether there is a corresponding connection for symptoms of exhaustion disorder.
- People whose work situation is such that the reward they receive is perceived to be small in relation to the effort they put into their job are at greater risk for developing symptoms of depression and exhaustion. Workers who experience job insecurity are at greater risk of developing depressive symptoms.
- People whose job provides opportunities for autonomy and who are treated fairly at work are a lower risk of developing symptoms of depression and exhaustion.

== Effects ==
In line with the work of Maslach and Jackson the World Health Organisation has defined burnout as consisting of:

1. feelings of energy depletion or exhaustion
2. increased mental distance from one's job, or feelings of negativism or cynicism related to one's job
3. reduced professional efficacy.

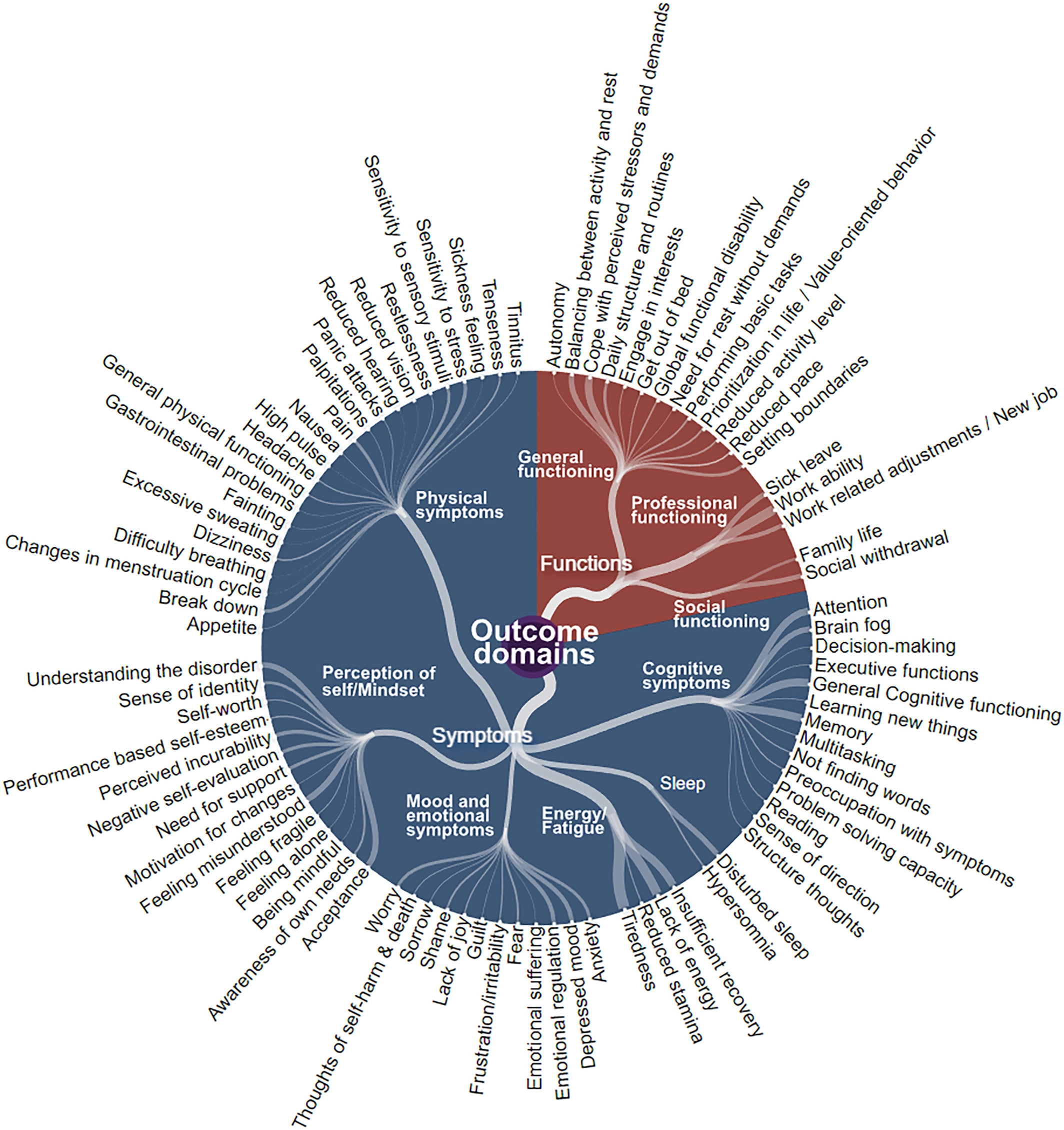
Symptoms sufferers, past sufferers and health professionals associate with exhaustion disorder.

Lindsäter et al. (2023) found a wide range of symptoms in individuals who were formally diagnosed with exhaustion disorder. The most commonly reported symptoms among people suffering with the disorder were tiredness, lack of energy, difficulty recovering from exertion, poor general cognitive functioning, memory problems, and difficulty coping with perceived stressors and demands. Some research indicates that burnout is associated with reduced job performance, coronary heart disease, and mental health problems. Emotional symptoms associated with occupational burnout include a lack of interest in work, reduced performance, feelings of helplessness, and trouble sleeping.

The Swedish health department has defined the effects of exhaustion disorder as being:

1. Concentration difficulties or impaired memory
2. Markedly reduced capacity to tolerate demands or to work under time pressure
3. Emotional instability or irritability
4. Sleep disturbance
5. Marked fatigability or physical weakness
6. Physical symptoms such as aches and pains, palpitations, gastrointestinal problems, vertigo or increased sensitivity to sound.

Research on dentists and physicians suggests that burnout is a depressive syndrome. Thus reduced job performance and cardiovascular risk could be related to burnout because of burnout's tie to depression. Behavioral signs of occupational burnout are demonstrated through cynicism within workplace relationships with coworkers, clients, and the organization itself. Forced overtime, heavy workloads, and frenetic work paces give rise to debilitating repetitive stress injuries, on-the-job accidents, over-exposure to toxic substances, and other dangerous work conditions. Williams and Strasser suggested that healthcare workers have focused much attention on the workplace risk factors for heart disease and other illnesses, but have underemphasized work-related depression risk.

Other effects of burnout can manifest as lower energy and productivity levels, with workers observed to be consistently late for work and feeling a sense of dread upon arriving. They can suffer concentration problems, forgetfulness, increased frustration, and/or feelings of being overwhelmed. They may complain and feel negative, or feel apathetic and believe they have little impact on their coworkers and environment. Occupational burnout is also associated with absenteeism, other time missed from work, and thoughts of quitting. Emerging research has also examined whether burnout is associated with maladaptive coping behaviours. A large study of working adults found that higher levels of burnout were associated with more frequent use of substances intended to enhance cognitive performance, particularly legal substances. In this study, burnout statistically mediated the association between elevated ADHD symptoms and substance use frequency, suggesting that stress-related exhaustion may be linked to increased reliance on pharmacological coping strategies in demanding work environments. These findings mirror earlier research suggesting similar patterns. For example, a cross-sectional study of junior physicians in Germany reported that higher burnout levels were associated with prior off-prescription stimulant use for performance enhancement.

As in depression, chronic burnout is also associated with cognitive impairments in memory and attention. Research suggests that burnout can manifest differently between genders, with higher levels of depersonalisation among men and increased emotional exhaustion among women. Other research suggests that people revealing a history of occupational burnout face future hiring discrimination.

== Treatment and prevention ==
There are thought to be three general types of workplace prevention-related interventions. Primary prevention-type interventions are aimed preventing health-damaging workplace stressors from developing in the first place or, if they are present, removing them from the workplace. Secondary prevention has an early-detection purpose and is aimed at helping workers who manifest the beginnings of a health problem before that problem becomes full blown. Tertiary prevention-type interventions are designed to help workers who have already experienced significant health problems.

=== Primary prevention ===
Maslach suggested that preventing burnout requires a combination of organizational change and worker education. She and her co-authors argued that burnout can occur in connection to six areas of work life: workload, control, reward, community, fairness, and values. For example, with regard to workload, an organization should ensure that a worker has adequate resources to meet job demands. With regard to values, clearly stated ethical organizational values are important for employee well-being and commitment. Supportive leadership and relationships with colleagues are also helpful.

Hätinen et al. suggested that "improving job-person fit by focusing attention on the relationship between the person and the job situation, rather than either of these in isolation, seems to be the most promising way of dealing with burnout". One approach for addressing these discrepancies focuses specifically on the fairness area. In one study employees met weekly to discuss and attempt to resolve perceived inequities in their job. The intervention was associated with decreases in exhaustion over time but not cynicism or inefficacy, suggesting that a broader approach is required.

Corporate Social Responsibility (CSR) initiatives are considered a resource which counteracts the stress effects of job demands, lowering employee burnout by boosting happiness, resilience and capitalizing altruism. Establishing a sense of psychological safety (the belief that it is safe to speak up) in an organisation helps prevent burnout. Similarly, feeling heard may also help. Increasing workers' control over their work tasks is another intervention that can reduce exhaustion and cynicism.

Despite the above recommendations, high-quality research on burnout prevention with random allocation of experimental units (either individual workers or organizational units) to intervention and control conditions has been relatively rare. For example, Richardson and Rothstein's (2008) meta-analysis of primary workplace interventions included only two high-quality studies that addressed burnout. In their meta-analysis, Estevez Corres et al. (2021) identified only eight high-quality primary prevention studies devoted to reducing emotional exhaustion in "high-stress jobs"; fewer high-quality primary prevention studies were devoted to depersonalization and reduced accomplishment.

In a qualitative study, Meluch (2023), found that disclosing feelings of job burnout tends to make employees feel vulnerable. She also found that the perceived judgment of coworkers towards burnout is worrisome. Kim and Lee recommended that organizations provide timely accurate information on activities and policies in order to minimize emotional exhaustion.

=== Secondary and tertiary prevention ===
Van der Klink and van Dijk (2003) suggested stress inoculation training, cognitive restructuring, and graded activity to help workers with burnout symptoms, although insufficient high-quality research has been carried out on their efficacy. Hätinen et al. (2007) listed a number of common secondary and tertiary interventions, including treatment of any outstanding medical conditions, stress management, time management, depression treatment, psychotherapies, ergonomic improvement as well as occupational therapy, physical exercise and relaxation. Mindfulness therapy has been used to help with occupational burnout in medical practitioners. Additional prevention methods include: starting the day with a relaxing ritual; yoga; adopting healthy eating, exercising, and sleeping habits; setting boundaries; taking breaks from technology; nourishing one's creative side, and learning how to manage stress.

Farber (2000), writing about educators, suggested that strategies such as setting achievable goals, focusing on the value of the work, and finding better ways of doing the job can help teachers experiencing occupational stress. Some secondary interventions can improve conditions at work by addressing work-life balance. The ways in which people spend their non-work time can help to prevent burnout and improve health and well-being. Training employees in ways to manage stress in the workplace has been thought to reduce burnout. One study suggests that social-cognitive processes such as commitment to work, self-efficacy, learned resourcefulness, and hope may insulate individuals from experiencing occupational burnout.

Kakiashvili et al. wrote that "medical treatment of burnout is mostly symptomatic: it involves measures to prevent and treat the symptoms." The authors reported that the use of pharmacotherapy to treat stress-related burnout is effective, but does nothing to change the sources of stress. They reported that the exhaustion and poor sleep that are part of burnout are best treated with cognitive behavioral therapy (CBT). Salomonsson et al. (2020) found that for workers with exhaustion disorder, CBT was better than a Return to Work Intervention (RTW-I) for reducing stress. The researchers also found that people who were primarily experiencing symptoms of depression, anxiety, or insomnia, CBT reduced total time away from work. van Dam et al. (2012) had also earlier found that CBT was an effective treatment. Parker et al. (2021) found that the most useful treatment strategies appear to be talking to someone and seeking support, walking or other exercise, mindfulness and meditation, improving sleep, and leaving work completely or taking time off work.

The Swedish national health information service (known as "1177") reported that treatment and rehabilitation for exhaustion disorder have several components, including:

- "Information and education about how stress affects the body.
- Counseling and education on lifestyle and on methods to reduce daily stress. It can be done individually or in a group.
- Treatment with CBT.
- Conversation with a counsellor, psychologist or occupational therapist.
- Physiotherapy to work with the body in different ways.
- Medicines for sleep difficulties or depression."

The Royal Dutch College of General Practiconers recommend a three-stage treatment process, made up of a crisis phase, a problem and solution stage, and an application stage. The Gothenburg regional government's Institute for Stress Medicine reports that "[r]ecovery [from exhaustion disorder] is found in what is undemanding and joyful, and what that is varies greatly between individuals. Sleep and physical exercise are the basis of recovery and should be prioritized initially." According to a survey of their patients in 2018, the two most important drivers of recovery were "the sick leave itself" and "advice on physical activity".

Despite the above recommendations, high-quality research (e.g., random allocation to experimental and control groups) has been relatively rare in secondary and tertiary prevention-related interventions aimed at reducing symptoms of occupational burnout. One study suggests that cognitive behavioral therapy (CBT), which was developed to treat depression, can help some workers with symptoms of occupational burnout although high-quality research on the application of CBT to treating burnout has been sparse. A shortcoming of CBT and other tertiary interventions is that they help to restructure the thinking of the worker/patient but do not change the adverse working conditions that give rise to the symptoms.

== See also ==
- Allostatic load
- Annual leave
- Autistic burnout
- Boreout
- Clouding of consciousness
- Code Lavender
- Critique of work
- Depression
- Effects of overtime
- Four-day workweek
- Job strain
- Karoshi
- Labor rights
- Lived experience
- Occupational Depression Inventory
- Occupational stress
- Overwork
- Paid time off
- Presenteeism
- Right to rest and leisure
- Six-hour day
- Stress (biological)
- Stress management
- Suicide crisis
- Tang ping
- Teacher burnout
- Quiet cracking
- Workaholic
- Workload
- Writer's block
