= Kielholz =

Kielholz is a surname. Notable people with the surname include:

- Leopold Kielholz (1911–1980), Swiss footballer
- Walter Kielholz (born 1951), Swiss businessman
- Paul Kielholz (1916–1990), Swiss psychiatrist
