= Equinox (1857) =

Wooden propeller-driven steamship

History
- Name: Equinox
- Owner: New York Central Railroad Co
- Builder: R. N. Jones
- Launched: 1857
- Fate: Sank (1875)

General characteristics
- Type: Bulk carrier
- Tonnage: 620 ton
- Length: 184 feet
- Beam: 31 feet
- Draught: 11.6 feet

Equinox was a 620-ton wooden propeller-driven steamship built in 1857 that primarily served as a bulk freighter on the Great Lakes. She sank on the night of September 10, 1875, while carrying a cargo of salt (6,708 barrels) and towing the schooner barge Emma A. Mayes through a severe gale off Au Sable (Point Au Sable) in Lake Michigan, with her final resting place located roughly 8 miles (13 km) off Big Sable Point. All but one crew member was lost. Although it is largely known in what area the vessel sunk, its exact wreck location are yet to be recorded.

== Design and construction ==
The vessel was constructed in 1857 by R. N. Jones of Buffalo, New York, as a wooden-hulled propeller-driven freighter. She was built to carry bulk dry goods, primarily salt and lumber, between cities on the Great Lakes. The vessel was originally owned by the New York Central Railroad Co. while it was owned by the Grand Trunk and Sarnia Line at the time of sinking. The vessel was broad and had a length of 184 feet (56 m), a beam of 31 feet (9.4 m), and a draft of 11.6 feet (3.5 m).

== Sinking ==
The vessel served the Lake Huron–Lake Michigan corridor for roughly 18 years, transporting goods and passengers before the disaster struck. On September 10, 1875, while en route from Saginaw, Michigan to Chicago, Illinois, Equinox agreed to assist in the recovery of the schooner barge Emma A. Mayes. Emma A. Mayes was loaded with lumber and had lost propulsion while transiting Lake Michigan. By the evening, a strong gale had developed, and Equinox began taking on water due to high seas and strong wind. The captain of the vessel called to Emma A. Hayes but that vessel's captain was unable to provide assistance. Just as the vessel began to sink, the tow line was cut, ultimately saving Emma A. Mayes which was able to reach Chicago the following morning and relay news of the sinking. Emma A. Hayes would subsequently sink in Lake Superior in May 1884 while transporting 850 tons of coal. The schooner Havana, which rescued the sole survivor, would also sink in October 1887 while carrying iron ore. Her wreck continues to be explored by divers in Lake Huron.

Equinox sank within minutes, with little debris left on the surface after the sinking. Accounts vary on the exact death toll due to unclear passenger manifests, although it is between 21 and 25 casualties. Those lost include the captain and his daughter and granddaughter, aged 19 and 17. The only person to survive the disaster was a helmsman who was rescued by the schooner Havana after floating on the pilot house for 31 hours. Another crew member was with him for a number of hours but succumbed to exhaustion before being found. The survivor was found roughly 80 miles (130 km) south-southwest of Manitou Island and roughly 85 miles (137 km) from where the vessel sank.
