= Marie Åsberg =

Swedish psychiatrist

Marie Åsberg (born 1938) is a Swedish psychiatrist. She was based at the Karolinska Institute until retirement in 2004.

In a pioneering 1976 paper, Åsberg found a link between low serotonin and violent suicide.

Åsberg is an expert on exhaustion disorder and burnout, and the need for self-care. She has developed the concept of an 'exhaustion funnel', to illustrate the way in which preoccupations can be narrowed by over-concentration on work.

She was the 2022 recipient of the ECNP Neuropsychopharmacology (ENA) Award, which recognises exceptional research achievements in applied and translational neuroscience.

== Works ==
- (with Lil Träskman and Peter Thorén) '5-HIAA in the Cerebrospinal Fluid: A Biochemical Suicide Predictor?', Archives of General Psychiatry. Vol. 33 (1976), pp.1193-1197.
- The CPRS : development and applications of a psychiatric rating scale. Copenhagen : Munksgaard, 1978.
- (with Stuart A. Montgomery) 'A New Depression Scale Designed to be Sensitive to Change'.
- (ed. with Michael A. Jenike) Understanding obsessive-compulsive disorder (OCD) : an international symposium held during the VIIIth World Congress of Psychiatry, Athens, Greece, October 1989. Toronto: Hogrefe & Huber Publishers, 1991.
- 'Neurotransmitters and Suicidal Behavior: The evidence from cerebrospinal fluid studies', Annals of the New York Academy of Sciences, 2006.
