= Code Lavender =

In healthcare, Code Lavender is a workplace crisis intervention tool used to provide peer support to nursing staff following traumatic events. The program is designed to reduce occupational burnout. Intervention is meant to be immediate with ongoing support through employee assistance program (EAP). Beyond emotional support, a code lavender may include aromatherapy, massage, mindful snacking, meditation, and pet therapy.

The code was first developed by Earl E. Bakken at North Hawaii Community Hospital.

== See also ==
- Hospital emergency codes
