= Herbert Freudenberger =

German-American psychologist (1926–1999)

Herbert J. Freudenberger
- Born: November 26, 1926; Frankfurt, Germany
- Died: 29 November 1999 (aged 73); New York City, United States
- Education: New York University Ph.D, 1956; Brooklyn College B.A., 1951
- Known for: Burnout (psychology)
- Awards: American Psychological Foundation Gold Medal Award for Life Achievement in the Practice of Psychology (1999)
- Scientific career
- Fields: Psychology

Herbert J. Freüdenberger (1926–1999) was a German-born American psychologist. Though Freudenberger had many jobs during his life, including practitioner, editor, theoretician, and author, his most significant contribution is in the understanding and treatment of stress, chronic fatigue and substance abuse.

Freudenberger was one of the first to describe the symptoms of exhaustion professionally and perform a comprehensive study of "burnout". In 1980, he published, with co-author Geraldine Richelson, Burn Out: The High Cost of High Achievement. What it is and how to survive it, a book dealing with chronic fatigue, which became a standard reference for the phenomenon. Freudenberger was awarded the American Psychological Foundation Gold Medal Award for Life Achievement in the Practice of Psychology in 1999.

== Early life ==
Freudenberger was born on November 26, 1926, in Frankfurt, Germany, to a middle-class Jewish-German family. His father was a cattle dealer, while his mother had three jobs: bookkeeper, housekeeper, and business partner.

During 1933, Hitler acquired power in Germany. Freudenberger's family was threatened with persecution by the Nazis. After the beating of Freudenberger's grandmother and the death of his grandfather, he fled to the United States, with his parents' approval and a false passport. Traveling alone through multiple cities and countries, Freudenberger arrived in New York, where he cared for himself until a relative gave him shelter. Once he had settled in New York, Freudenberger quickly learned English, and graduated from a junior high school with honors. When his parents finally came to the US, Freudenberger began work as a tool and die maker's apprentice to assist them, instead of beginning high school.

== Education ==
Without a high school diploma and working at the manufacturing plant, Freudenberger began attending night classes at Brooklyn College. In a psychology class, he made the acquaintance of Abraham Maslow, who influenced Freudenberger to earn a degree in psychology and was his model and mentor. During 1951, Freudenberger received his bachelor's degree in psychology from Brooklyn College. He entered New York University's (NYU) clinical psychology program, and earned his master's degree in psychology during 1952, followed by his doctorate in psychology during 1956. During this time, Freudenberger was also a student at the National Psychological Association for Psychoanalysis (NPAP) (as well as NYU) and continued to work in a factory at night. During 1962, he finished his analytic training at NPAP.

== Career ==
Freudenberger started his own psychological-psychoanalytic practice during 1958, which became very successful. From 1970 to 1999, Freudenberger was senior faculty member and training analyst for NPAP, while continuing his private practice. In his career, Freudenberer was also an assistant/visiting professor at Great Neck Adult Education Center (1958 to 1960), Queens College, City University of New York (1962 to 1965), Brooklyn College (1955 to 1958), Louisiana State University (1956), New York University (1963 to 1973), and New School for Social Research (1974 to 1988). During the 1970s, Freudenberger decided to help the development of the free clinic movement, which, unusually for the time, treated substance abusers. Freudenberger devoted a large amount of time to these clinics, without pay. As a consultant, he created and supervised training programs for drug abuse treatment at the Archdiocese of New York from 1974 to 1984.

Throughout his career, Freudenberger made scholarly contributions that were recognized in the United States and around the world. In recognition, he was made Fellow of the American Psychological Association during 1972. He also received awards such as the Psychologist of the Year Award from both the American Psychological Association (APA) and the American Society of Psychologists in Private Practice in 1981, the Distinguished Psychologist Award from the APA and their Division of Psychotherapy during 1983, the Presidential Citation from the APA during 1990, and the Carl F. Heiser Special Presidential Award from the (APA) during 1992.

Freudenberger worked for the APA Task Force on Substance Abuse during 1991 and the Board of Professional Affairs from 1975 to 1978. He also worked for the APA on the Council of Representatives; there, he represented the Division of Independent Practice from 1986 to 1989, and the Division of Psychotherapy from 1974 to 1975, and 1982–84. He was president of both the Divisions of Psychotherapy from 1980 to 1981 and of Independent Practice from 1982 to 1983, and also of the New York Society of Clinical Psychologists from 1965 to 1967 and 1978–79, and also a founding board member of the National Academies of Practice during 1981 and a national co-chair of the National Council of Graduate Education in Psychology from 1968 to 1974.

== Burnout ==
The clinical concept which Freudenberger termed "burn out" was originally developed from his work with the free clinics and through therapeutic communities. Freudenberger defined burnout to be a "state of mental and physical exhaustion caused by one's professional life". Along with colleague Gail North, Freudenberger created a list of phases of burnout.

== Family and death ==
Freudenberger met Arlene Francis Somer during 1961 and they wed soon afterward. Together, they had three children: Lisa, Mark, and Lori. Lisa received a doctoral degree of clinical psychology. Mark became a slumlord in NYC. Lori became an assistant district attorney.

Freudenberger traveled much with his family throughout the United States, and also traveled to Canada, Europe, and Israel. Though he grew up in Germany, he never returned there.

Late in life he was interviewed by video by the Shoah Foundation for its collection of memoirs of Jewish Holocaust survivors.

From 1994 to 1999, Freudenberger had kidney disease along with failing physical health. He continued to work until he died in New York City Hospital on November 29, 1999.
