= Maslach Burnout Inventory =

Assessment tool for occupational burnout

- Purpose: introspective psychological inventory pertaining to occupational burnout

The Maslach Burnout Inventory (MBI) is a psychological assessment instrument comprising 16 to 22 symptom items pertaining to occupational burnout. The original form of the MBI was developed by Christina Maslach and Susan E. Jackson. Their goal was to develop an instrument to assess an individual's experience of burnout symptoms. The instrument takes 10 minutes to complete. The MBI measures three dimensions of burnout: emotional exhaustion, depersonalization, (Note: The term "depersonalization" as used by Maslach and Jackson should not be confused with the same term used in psychiatry and clinical psychology as a hallmark of dissociative disorder.) and personal accomplishment. Schaufeli (2003), a major figure in burnout research, criticized the instrument, writing that "the MBI is neither grounded in firm clinical observation nor based on sound theorising. Instead, it has been developed inductively by factor-analysing a rather arbitrary set of items" (p. 3).

Following the publication of the MBI in 1981, new versions of the MBI were gradually developed to apply to different occupational groups. There are now five versions of the MBI: Human Services Survey (MBI-HSS), Human Services Survey for Medical Personnel (MBI-HSS (MP)), Educators Survey (MBI-ES), General Survey (MBI-GS), and General Survey for Students (MBI-GS [S]).

The psychometric properties of the MBI have proved to be problematic, for example, in terms of factorial validity (measuring a unitary construct) and measurement invariance, casting doubt on the conceptual coherence and syndromal cohesiveness of burnout. Two meta-analyses report on sample-specific reliability estimates for the three MBI subscales. The meta-analyses found that the emotional exhaustion subscale has good enough reliability; however, evidence for the reliability of the depersonalization and personal accomplishment subscales is weaker. Research based on the job demands-resources (JD-R) model indicates that the emotional exhaustion, the core of burnout, is directly related to demands/workload and inversely related to the extensiveness of the resources at a worker's disposal. The MBI has been validated for human services samples, educator samples, and general worker samples.

The MBI is sometimes combined with the Areas of Worklife Survey (AWS) to assess levels of burnout and worklife context.

== Uses ==
According Maslach and her colleagues, the MBI has several uses:

- Assess professional burnout in human service, education, business, and government professions.
- Assess and validate the three-dimensional structure of burnout.
- Understand the nature of burnout for developing effective interventions.

== Subscales ==
The various versions of MBI subscales are enumerated below.

=== Emotional Exhaustion (EE) ===
The 9-item Emotional Exhaustion (EE) subscale measures feelings of being emotionally overextended and exhausted by one's work. Higher scores correspond to greater experienced burnout. This scale is used in the MBI-HSS, MBI-HSS (MP), and MBI-ES versions.

The MBI-GS and MBI-GS (S) use a shorter 5-item version of this subscale called "Exhaustion".

=== Depersonalization (DP) ===
The 5-item Depersonalization (DP) subscale measures an unfeeling and impersonal response toward recipients of one's service, care, treatment, or instruction. Higher scores indicate higher degrees of experienced burnout. This subscale is used in the MBI-HSS, MBI-HSS (MP) and the MBI-ES versions.

=== Personal Accomplishment (PA) ===
The 8-item Personal Accomplishment (PA) subscale measures feelings of competence and successful achievement in one's work. Lower scores correspond to greater experienced burnout. This scale is used in the MBI-HSS, MBI-HSS (MP), and MBI-ES versions.

=== Cynicism ===
The 5-item Cynicism subscale measures an indifference or a distance attitude towards one's work. It is akin to the Depersonalization subscale. The cynicism measured by this subscale is a coping mechanism for distancing oneself from exhausting job demands. Higher scores correspond to greater experienced burnout. This subscale is used in the MBI-GS and MBI-GS (S) versions.

=== Professional Efficacy ===
The 6-item Professional Efficacy subscale measures feelings of competence and successful achievement in one's work. It is akin to the Personal Accomplishment subscale. This sense of personal accomplishment emphasizes effectiveness and success in having a beneficial impact on people. Lower scores correspond to greater experienced burnout. This subscale is used in the MBI-GS and MBI-GS (S) versions.

== Forms ==
The MBI has five validated forms composed of 16 to 22 items. They are enumerated below:

=== Maslach Burnout Inventory - Human Services Survey (MBI-HSS) ===
The MBI-HSS consists of 22 items and is the original and most widely used version of the MBI. It was designed for professionals in human services and is appropriate for respondents working in a diverse array of occupations, including nurses, physicians, health aides, social workers, health counselors, therapists, police, correctional officers, clergy, and other fields focused on helping people live better lives by offering guidance, preventing harm, and ameliorating physical, emotional, or cognitive problems. The MBI-HSS subscales are Emotional Exhaustion, Depersonalization, and Personal Accomplishment.

=== Maslach Burnout Inventory - Human Services Survey for Medical Personnel (MBI-HSS (MP)) ===
The MBI-HSS (MP) is a variation of the MBI-HSS adapted for medical personnel. The most notable alteration is this form refers to "patients" instead of "recipients". The MBI-HSS (MP) subscales are Emotional Exhaustion, Depersonalization, and Personal Accomplishment.

=== Maslach Burnout Inventory - Educators Survey (MBI-ES) ===
The MBI-ES consists of 22 items and is a version of the original MBI for use with educators. It was designed for teachers, administrators, other staff members, and volunteers working in any educational setting. This form was formerly known as MBI-Form Ed. The MBI-ES subscales are Emotional Exhaustion, Depersonalization, and Personal Accomplishment.

=== Maslach Burnout Inventory - General Survey (MBI-GS) ===
The MBI-GS consists of 16 items and is designed for use with occupational groups other than human services and education, including those working in jobs such as customer service, maintenance, manufacturing, management, and most other professions. The MBI-GS subscales are Exhaustion, Cynicism, and Professional Efficacy.

=== Maslach Burnout Inventory - General Survey for Students (MBI-GS (S)) ===
The MBI-GS (S) is an adaptation of the MBI-GS designed to assess burnout in college and university students. It is available for use, but its psychometric properties are not yet documented. The MBI-GS (S) subscales are Exhaustion, Cynicism, and Professional Efficacy.

== Scoring ==
All MBI items are scored using a 7 level frequency ratings from "never" to "daily." The MBI has three component subscales: emotional exhaustion (9 items), depersonalization (5 items) and personal achievement (8 items). Each subscale measures its own unique dimension of burnout. Subscales should not be combined to form a single burnout scale. Importantly, the recommendation of examining the three dimensions of burnout separately implies that, in practice, the MBI is a measure of three independent constructs - emotional exhaustion, depersonalization, and personal accomplishment - rather than a measure of burnout. Maslach, Jackson, and Leiter described item scoring from 0 to 6. There are score ranges that define low, moderate and high levels of each subscale based on the 0-6 scoring.

The 7-level frequency subscale for all MBI subscales is as follows:

- Never (0)
- A few times a year or less (1)
- Once a month or less (2)
- A few times a month (3)
- Once a week (4)
- A few times a week (5)
- Every day (6)

== Examples of use ==
The Maslach Burnout Inventory has been used in a variety of studies to study burnout, including with health professionals and teachers. Evidence adduced by Ahola et al. (2014) and Bianchi et al. (2014) suggests that the MBI is measuring a depressive condition.

== Alternatives ==
Researchers who have been dissatisfied with the MBI have developed alternative measures. These measures include the Copenhagen Burnout Inventory, the Shirom-Melamed Burnout Measure, the Oldenberg Burnout Inventory, the Burnout Assessment Tool, and the Occupational Depression Inventory.
