= Susan E. Jackson =

American academic

Susan E. Jackson is an American researcher in the fields of managing for environmental sustainability, strategic human resource management, occupational burnout, and work team diversity. She was the co-author of the Maslach Burnout Inventory in 1981, the primary diagnostic instrument for the condition of occupational burnout.

== Education ==
She received her BA in psychology and sociology from the University of Minnesota, and her master's and doctoral degrees in organizational and social psychology from the University of California at Berkeley.

== Career ==
She has published more than 150 scholarly articles and chapters, and authored or edited several books. This includes being the lead author of the common textbook "Managing human resources".

She also served as editor of the Academy of Management Review, and was president of the American Academy of Management in 2010–2011.

In 2015, she received an honorary doctorate from the University of Zurich, for her contributions to sustainability management, workgroup diversity, and strategic human resource management.

Until June 2021, she was the Distinguished Professor of Human Resource Management at Rutgers University, having worked in its School of Management and Labor Relations for more than 22 years.

She had earlier worked at New York University, University of Michigan, and University of Maryland. She was part of the Diversity Research Project based at the University of Pennsylvania. In Switzerland, she had been a visiting scholar at University of Lucerne, and a member of the advisory board of the Institute for Business Administration at the University of Zurich.
