= Exhaustion disorder =

Stress-induced disorder causing fatigue and cognitive disability

- Other names: stress-induced exhaustion disorder
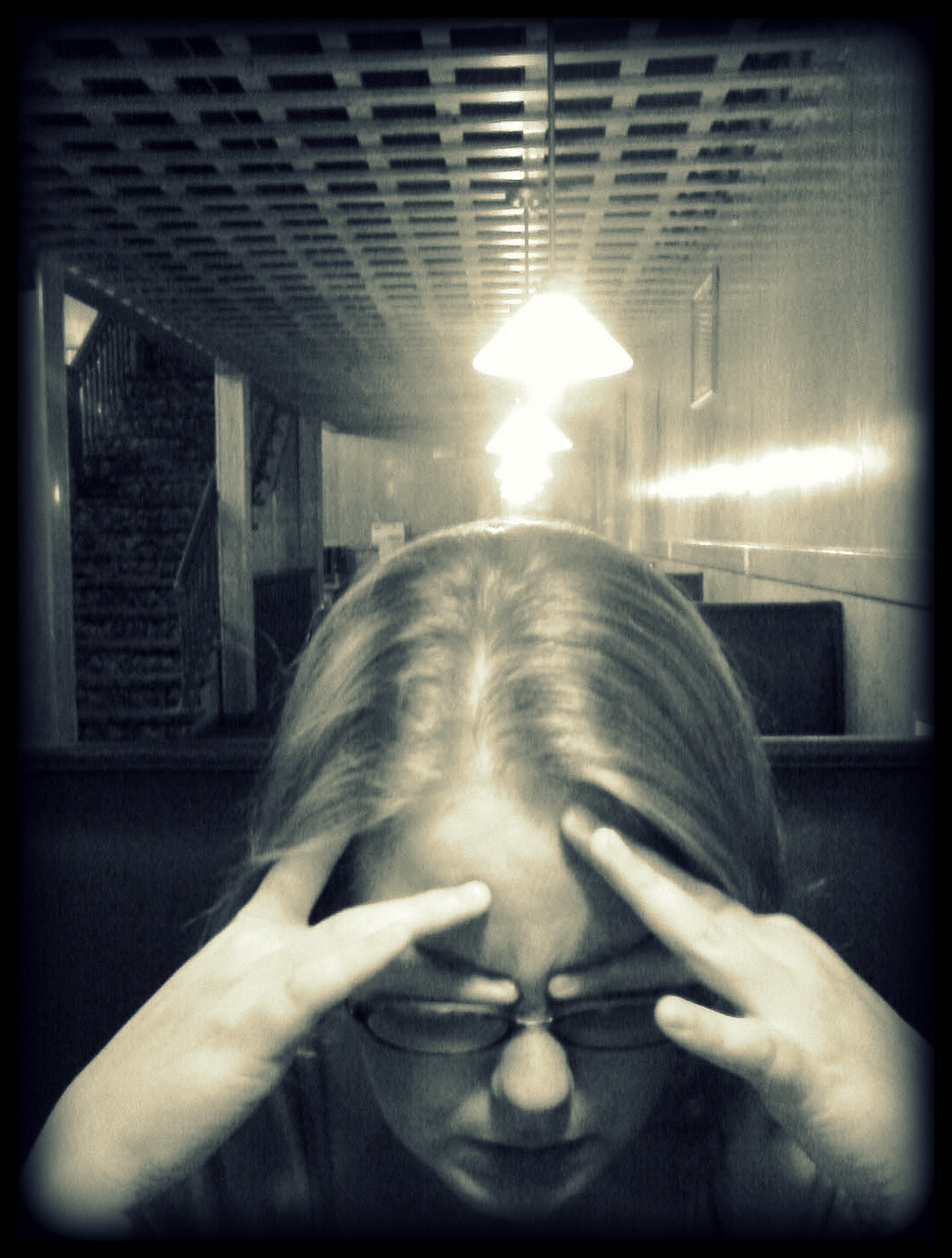
- a woman portraying the emotion of stress
- Specialty: General practice, occupational medicine, rehabilitation medicine, psychiatry
- Symptoms: exhaustion, reduced cognitive ability and various physical symptoms
- Duration: Long-term recovery
- Causes: Prolonged and elevated stress
- Risk factors: Being female, working in care professions
- Diagnostic method: Clinical
- Treatment: Symptomatic
- Prevalence: unknown

Exhaustion disorder or stress-induced exhaustion disorder (ED, Swedish: utmattningssyndrom) is a diagnosis used in Swedish healthcare to indicate a maladaptive stress disorder more severe than adjustment disorder. Common signs include exhaustion, reduced cognitive ability and a range of physical symptoms. The symptoms develop gradually as a result of prolonged and elevated stress, but often culminate abruptly as the disorder becomes fulminant. Recovery will generally take from six months to a full year, sometimes longer. There are significant overlaps between symptoms of exhaustion disorder and depression, two conditions that frequently occur simultaneously. There are also many similarities between exhaustion disorder and occupational burnout. In common Swedish vernacular utbrändhet (burnout) is used synonymously with exhaustion disorder, but this usage is dissuaded in professional settings.

The diagnosis was introduced in 2003, and with support from the Swedish National Board of Health and Welfare it was included in the Swedish edition of ICD-10 in 2005. Since its introduction it has become a leading cause for sick leave in Sweden. Among patients receiving compensation from the Swedish Social Insurance Agency for more than 90 days, it is the most common diagnosis and women are at higher risk than men. The diagnosis is not used outside of Sweden.

Treatment approaches vary between healthcare providers and the different regions of the country. Common elements include psychoeducation, physical activity and individual psychotherapy or group therapy. Multimodal rehabilitation programs have also been offered by specialized providers. Several treatment options are effective at reducing symptoms, but no available treatment option successfully reduces the duration until return to work. Due to the limited effect of available treatment options, preventative measures are considered the most important intervention to reduce the burden of disease.

== Signs and symptoms ==
Exposure to stress is a part of life that generates a host of different responses, some of them akin to signs of illness without constituting or resulting in disease. How to differentiate between benign and maladaptive responses to stress is not necessarily evident, and from a dimensional rather than categorical perspective there is no sharp line dividing normality and illness. The difference between tolerable and pathological stress seems to depend on a complex interaction between stress factors, and the affected persons mental resources and protective factors. A prolonged period of elevated stress can lead to exhaustion, sleep disorders and a decline in cognitive abilities. The diagnosis of exhaustion disorder is designed to capture a state of illness far removed from the transient stress of everyday life.

The symptoms of exhaustion disorder include fatigue that does not improve with rest, reduced stress tolerance and various physical symptoms. Some of the more common physical symptoms are headaches, dizziness and bowel issues. Most patients also suffer from sleeping problems. Exhaustion disorder and depression have several overlapping symptoms and often occur simultaneously, but many people suffering from exhaustion disorder do not satisfy the diagnostic criteria for depression. Symptom overlap between exhaustion disorder and other mental disorders is not unusual, but rather a common theme among mental disorders.

The typical course of disease is divided into three phases: at risk, acute sickness and recovery. At risk individuals experience a gradual onset of symptoms over a prolonged period of time, followed by a sudden deterioration and a long recovery, with pronounced exhaustion and reduced cognitive capacity. The initial phase can last several years and various complaints such as fatigue, headaches, anxiety, sleeplessness, irritability, dizziness or bowel issues may erupt. During this phase, some people seek medical care for physical or other isolated symptoms. The rate of recovery and progress from the at risk stage is unknown. If the disease progresses the fatigue compounds, with increasing cognitive decline and an inability perform everyday activities. At the peak of distress some are compelled to seek emergency care due to panic or chest pain, where the resulting examination fails to identify any physical cause. This critical stage tends to be described in terms of a crisis or "collapse" by the affected person and their associates. There is usually a marked aversion to the workplace for a while, and either an increased sleep duration or sleep disturbances. As the overall condition slowly improves the physical symptoms tend to abate, but sleeping disorders and cognitive impairments may linger, and stress tolerance recovers slowly.

== Causes ==
Exhaustion disorder is stress-induced by definition and could be caused by stress in the workplace or from other environments. The underlying physiological mechanisms are as of 2023 incompletely understood. Early on, a decreased sensitivity within the HPA axis was identified in small scientific studies, resulting in an attenuated release of cortisol in response to stimulation. Subsequent investigations into this abnormality have produced mixed results, and several later scientific reports found no difference compared to healthy controls. Studies using magnetic resonance imaging have indicated changes to the prefrontal cortex, basal ganglia and amygdala. However, the number of studies and their participants are limited, and more research is needed to validate these findings.

== Diagnosis ==
Exhaustion disorder is a clinical diagnosis made by a qualified health care professional based on the patient's recollection of the course of disease. Blood samples cannot be used to ascertain the diagnosis but may, like ECG, be employed to rule out alternative diagnoses. Several physical and mental disorders may present with symptoms similar to exhaustion disorder, which makes it a diagnosis of exclusion. Relevant physical alternative diagnoses are symptom dependent, but could include hypothyroidism, vitamin B_{12} deficiency, COPD, cardiovascular disease and diabetes. There are also many commonalities with the chronic conditions fibromyalgia and ME/CFS.

The utility of measuring saliva-cortisol has been evaluated, but it serves a purpose only in research settings.

=== Classification ===
Exhaustion disorder is included in the Swedish version of ICD-10, designated as F43.8A. The diagnosis is part of the diagnostic group "Adaptation disorders and response to severe stress". For classification purposes exhaustion disorder is marked as a complementary diagnosis if a patient suffers from a concurrent mental health disorder of significance; this includes depression, dysthymia or generalised anxiety disorder.

In order to confirm the diagnosis of exhaustion disorder, physical and mental exhaustion must be present following a prolonged period of elevated stress. The major criteria of significantly reduced mental energy must have been present for at least 2 weeks. One or several prior stress-inducing factors should be identified and the exposure must have lasted for 6 months or longer. At least 4 out of 6 minor criteria are needed to complete the diagnosis. It is considered vital to differentiate between exhaustion disorder and other responses to elevated or severe stress, such as adjustment disorder, acute stress disorder and PTSD. The 2024 Åsberg review recommends that the criteria be interpreted strictly to avoid medicalization, and emphasizes that a combination of fatigue and diminished cognitive capacity must be present for the diagnosis to be considered.

The diagnosis has not been recognized outside Sweden. (Note: Though the diagnostic criteria have been used in a few scientific studies in Norway.) There is a lack of consensus internationally concerning the proper way to diagnose, classify and treat conditions brought on by chronic stress. It has been suggested that the exhaustion disorder construct is an attempt to create a recognizable medical diagnosis from the burnout concept, similar to the use of neurasthenia in the Dutch healthcare system, and how fatigue-dominant somatoform disorder can be used. The umbrella term "Exhaustion due to persistent non-traumatic stress" has been proposed for such afflictions. It is considered likely that the suffering recognized as exhaustion disorder in Swedish healthcare settings in many other countries would be interpreted as symptoms of depression or an anxiety disorder, or be described with alternative terms such as clinical burnout, work-related neurasthenia, work-related depression, adjustment disorder or somatization syndrome.

=== Questionnaires and rating scales ===
Various questionnaires may be of use to evaluate the risk for burnout or exhaustion, rate the intensity of symptoms or screen for co-morbid disorders. The Karolinska Exhaustion Disorder Scale (KEDS) is used to quantify symptoms of exhaustion among the afflicted and at risk individuals. Shirom-Melamed Burnout Questionnaire (SMBQ) is a tool originally developed for occupational burnout sometimes employed as a rating scale in the evaluation of exhaustion disorder. Despite the conceptual difference between ED and burnout these questionnaires have many similarities.

The Montgommery Åsberg Depression Rating Scale (MADRAS) is used to evaluate simultaneous symptoms of depression and the Hospital Anxiety and Depression Scale (HAD) measure signs of both depression or anxiety. The Alcohol Use Disorders Identification Test (AUDIT) screens for overuse of alcohol. The World Health Organization's Disability Assessment Timetable (WHODAT 2.0) has been studied as a means to distinguish between exhaustion and the less severe adjustment disorder, but no currently available scales or questionnaires are properly validated for use in differential diagnostics.

== Treatment ==
=== Treatment options ===
Psychoeducation on stress, and the role of working conditions and lifestyle factors, are common treatment approaches. Physical activity is also considered an important part of rehabilitation. Psychotherapy in one-on-one or group settings, including methods for stress management may be a part of the protocol. Antidepressants are not considered effective in treating exhaustion, but may be used to treat concurrent depression or anxiety. The guidelines for treatment published by the Swedish National Board of Health and Welfare offers an ensemble of options and are open to interpretation. The actual treatment provided varies between different providers and parts of the country, depending on local traditions and resources, including access to multimodal rehabilitation (MMR). Since the symptoms are long-lasting it is generally considered appropriate to start partial return to work before complete remission of symptoms.

Before return to work a joint-appointment (Swedish: avstämningsmöte) between the patient, employer, care provider and the Social Insurance Agency is sometimes called for to agree on common terms for a gradual increase in workload. Depending on the circumstances a union representative or other support person may accompany the patient–employee.

=== Evidence ===
Many different treatment options have been investigated and assessed scientifically. Since exhaustion disorder results in a long-lasting and severe loss of function, usually brought on by work-related stress, time until "return to work" is considered the most important end-point when evaluating the effectiveness of various treatments.

The body of research is small, since the diagnosis is only recognized in a single country. There is limited evidence concerning the efficacy of treatments in terms of return to work, primary research studies on the topic are wrought with generally low numbers of participants, and show marginal or no effect. Two reviews published in 2019 and 2022 have pointed to limitations in the methods of the available research on treatment. MMR is a preferred treatment according to the guidelines, but its utility is hard to investigate, since the makeup of the team and their approach varies between care providers. Therapeutic approaches like CBT and ACT reduce stress-induced symptoms in the short term, and have been found cost-efficient in health-economic studies, but there is limited or no evidence for any effect on return to work. Similar claims have been made concerning MMR, but there are no controlled trials evaluating it as a treatment for exhaustion. Physical activity is proven to be effective against several mental disorders. In healthy individuals it improves cognition and confers protection against stress-induced symptoms. Due to limitations in study design and size, the effects of physical exercise in fully developed exhaustion disorder is unknown. Improved sleep is considered important for recovery and CBT is effective against sleep disorders in general, but the specific case of the proper way to treat sleep problems in patients with simultaneous exhaustion disorder has not been studied. The use of internet-based CBT in exhaustion disorder and burnout suggests that its effects on exhaustion symptoms are mediated by improved sleep. No scientific studies have investigated the utility of treating exhaustion disorder with antidepressants.

Due to the limited efficacy of currently available treatment options, the need to focus on preventative measures has been highlighted as the most important intervention in order to mitigate stress-induced sickness.

== Prognosis ==
The time to recovery is considered relatively long, lasting several months and in some instances years; the guidelines from the Swedish Social Insurance Agency supports a sick leave duration between 6 and 12 months. The increased incidence of exhaustion disorder during the early 21st century contributed to an increase in the mean length of sick leave for mental health reasons in Sweden.

There is limited scientific evidence describing the general prognosis or allowing for individual prognostication in cases of exhaustion. Studying the natural course of the disease is complicated by the high rates of co-morbid depression and anxiety disorders. A follow-up of patients that had participated in multimodal rehabilitation has shown an improvement of exhaustion- and physical symptoms over the course of 18 months. Still, at the time of long term follow-up 7–10 years later, almost half of the participants experienced fatigue and a majority reported a lasting reduction in stress tolerance. The duration of symptoms before the first contact with healthcare is the most significant predictor of the length of recovery.

== Epidemiology ==
No large epidemiological studies on the prevalence of exhaustion disorder have been published. In smaller questionnaire-based studies symptoms of exhaustion have been approximated to occur in 15% of the general Swedish population, 15% of healthcare workers and 30% of primary care patients. Such studies are likely to generate overestimates of the prevalence of disease. The actual prevalence of exhaustion disorder is unknown.

Persons with exhaustion disorder are at an increased risk of certain physical diseases including diabetes, cardiovascular disease and chronic pain.

=== Sick leave ===
Of people receiving compensation for mental disorders from the Swedish Social Insurance Agency in 2019, 18% of the women and 13% of the men received compensation due to exhaustion disorder, leaving women at a 40% greater risk. Female public employees of the Regions and Municipalities of Sweden are at a higher risk of all stress related diagnoses. This difference between the sexes is not sufficiently explained by factors related to either sex or gender, but is proportional to actual stress exposure. According to statistics from the Swedish Social Insurance Agency cases peak between the ages of 35–44. The diagnostic group "reactions to severe stress, and adjustment disorders", where exhaustion disorder belongs, has grown to become the most common cause for sick leave in the country, mirroring how stress-related disorders have become the leading cause for sick leave in the OECD. Alongside this trend, the numbers for anxiety diagnoses, major depressive disorder and bipolar disorder, have remained relatively stable in Sweden. Among patients receiving compensation from the Swedish Social Insurance Agency for more than 90 days, exhaustion disorder is the most common diagnosis and the ratio of women to men is 4 to 1.

=== Risk factors ===
The principal cause is usually workplace stress, but several other factors influence the risk of disease. Individuals with children in kindergarten or the first few years of school are at higher risk (with children ages 3–8). Having more than one child or having recently gone through divorce proceedings also increase the risk of exhaustion. Bosses and managers, as well as people working in occupations where a university degree is required, are at a lower risk. However, there is an increased risk of disease among workers in care professions, even those where a degree is a prerequisite.

==== Factors related to working conditions ====
In a systematic review from 2014 the Swedish Agency for Health Technology Assessment and Assessment of Social Services found that several work related factors influenced the risk of developing symptoms of depression or exhaustion disorder. (Note: For the purposes of the review, exhaustion disorder was considered analogous to burnout.) Factors related to an increased risk of symptoms of both conditions were: a lack of peer-to-peer support, experiencing a heavy work-load or a lack of gratification in relation to efforts. Uncertain forms of employment and threats of closure were also associated with an increased risk of symptoms. Some factors were found to increase the risk of symptoms of depression, but not exhaustion. This was true for cases of bullying and conflict in the workplace, and for the combination of high expectations with limited influence over working conditions. Some factors confer a protective effect. Influence and control over working conditions diminish the presence of symptoms related to either condition.

== History ==
=== Background ===
An early proposed progenitor of exhaustion is neurasthenia. On the rise during the late 19th and early 20th century until the rise of psychoanalysis in the 1920s, it shares many symptoms with exhaustion disorder. The term itself was introduced in 1869 by the American neurologist George Miller Beard, and was popularized soon thereafter. Beard believed that the condition was brought on by the woes of modern life — express trains, and a fixation with time and especially measuring it — that subjected the human psyche to overload. Demanding working conditions causing overexertion was considered the principal cause of acquired neurasthenia. In the 1940s, Hans Selye discovered the hypothalamic–pituitary–adrenal axis and its connection to the stress response, which popularized stress as a medical term. Further investigations during the late 20th century uncovered how different parts of the human brain change in response to chronic stress. French psychiatrist Claude Veil started diagnosing patients with work-related exhaustion (French: épuisement professionnel) in 1959, and in the 1960s French and German psychiatrists would separate cases of depression into various sub-classes, including "exhaustion-depression" (German: Erschöpfungsdepression).

Another term with many commonalities to exhaustion disorder is burnout. This term, with origins in the 1960s, was originally used to describe a reaction observed in caretaking professionals. The most disseminated version of burnout was developed by Christina Maslach, and is defined by the triad of emotional exhaustion, cynicism and an experience of reduced professional capacity. The syndrome of burnout was initially exclusively focused on occupation related stress-inducers, but was later expanded to include other kinds of stress. The description of the condition has shifted over time and between different scholars, which has contributed to burnout never attaining the status of a medical diagnosis in either the ICD or the DSM, with fixed diagnostic criteria. The first stress-related diagnosis to be formally recognized by the American Psychiatric Association was PTSD, at its inclusion in the DSM III in 1980. In occupational medicine the initial focus on physical ergonomics and toxicology has been complemented by an awareness of psycho-social stress as an inducer of illness and premature death.

=== Introduction and developments ===
The late 1990s and early 00s saw an increase in the number of Swedes on prolonged sick leave or receiving disability pension. The rise was higher for mental disorders and female public employees were over-represented. Cuts to the public sector during the '90s have later been pointed to as the cause. The downsizing should have caused an increased work load, and as workers succumbed to overwork fewer and fewer remaining employees would have been left to share the burden. Overarching socio-cultural and workplace related developments since the 1980s, including increased information density and exchange, and both parents working full-time while raising children, have also been emphasized as contributors.

Efforts to formulate the diagnosis were sparked by an increase in sick leave numbers attributed to depression, for customers served by one of the larger Swedish insurance agencies. Doctors Marie Åsberg and Åke Nygren were notified of the surge in 1998 and decided to investigate. They found that the symptoms did not match the typical presentation of depression. Complaints like fatigue and decreased cognitive ability dominated and many interviewees believed their working conditions to be the cause. The condition was considered distinct from depression and Åsberg suggested using the term utmattningsdepression ("exhaustion-depression"). In 2002 she was authorized by Kerstin Wigzell, Director-General of the Swedish National Board of Health and Welfare, to investigate the condition and conduct a scientific review. Several physicians and paramedical aides specialized in treatment of stress-related disorders joined the investigation. The initial moniker was forgone in 2003 in favor of utmattningssyndrom (exhaustion disorder), which gained traction as a diagnosis that same year when the Board of Health and Welfare published the results of the investigation in the book Utmattningssyndrom: stressrelaterad psykisk ohälsa. The body of research on stress-induced mental disorders was deemed lacking, and the need to conduct research into and validate the newly formulated diagnosis was stressed. The diagnosis was introduced into the Swedish edition of ICD-10 in 2005. No scientific articles investigating exhaustion disorder had been published at the time. This formal recognition meant that the condition could thereafter be used as a reason for sick leave. As the diagnosis was recognized, efforts to formulate guidelines for diagnostics, treatment and sick leave continued. The first edition of guidelines was published by the Board of Health and Welfare in 2008, delayed by roughly half a year due to "disagreements in the medical corps."

Since 2019 a working group led by Marie Åsberg has developed a new set of guidelines, which were eventually published by Gothia Kompetens in 2024. Another group led by psychiatrist Christian Rück published a scoping review on the condition in 2022, questioning its validity and reliability as a medical diagnosis.
