= Gordon Parker (psychiatrist) =

Australian psychiatrist

Gordon Barraclough Parker AO (born 1 April 1942) is an Australian psychiatrist who is scientia professor of psychiatry at the University of New South Wales (UNSW).

Parker’s particular focus is on the phenomenology and epidemiology of mood disorders, social psychiatry, and the treatment (both psychotherapy and pharmacotherapy) and management of mood disorders. His research has assisted in modelling psychiatric conditions – depression, bipolar and personality disorders – and examining causes, mechanisms and treatments for mood disorders, together with innovative clinical work. Parker is a critic of the current unitary classification of major depressive disorder (as represented in the DSM-5), and has proposed the revival of the diagnosis of melancholia. In 2010 he was made an officer of the Order of Australia in recognition of his distinguished service to psychiatry as a clinician and researcher, particularly as a major contributor to the understanding and innovative treatment of mood disorders and as founder and Executive Director of the Black Dog Institute.

== Early life and education ==
Parker was born in Melbourne, schooled at Sydney Church of England Grammar School in Sydney, completed an MB BS at the University of Sydney (USyd), and an MD (1978), PhD (1983) and DSc (1997) at the University of New South Wales (UNSW). He is married, with four children. His path to Medicine and his clinical rationale is outlined in his autobiography, "A Piece of My Mind".

== Career ==
Parker was Head of the School of Psychiatry at the University of NSW from 1983-2002, as well as Director of the Division of Psychiatry at Prince of Wales and Prince Henry Hospitals in Sydney from 1983 to 1996. In 2002, he became the founder and inaugural Director of the Black Dog Institute, an organisation that focuses on research into and treatment of mood disorders, in particular clinical depression and bipolar disorder.

As a consequence of his advocacy for diagnosing melancholia, in 2010 Parker was invited to head a group of prominent international psychiatrists to argue for its separate status in the new DSM-5 classificatory system.

Parker has been a member of the Editorial Boards of 16 journals, and was the invited Editor of the December 2015 issue of Acta Psychiatrica Scandinavica. He is an invited assessor for various National Health and Medical Research (NHMRC) Grants as well as for scientific journals, for example, The Lancet and The American Journal of Psychiatry. He has been involved with the Royal Australian and New Zealand College of Psychiatrists (RANZCP) – as Editor of the Journal (1979–88) and Chair of the Quality Assurance Committee (1990–95).

Parker has also held a number of positions with legal organisations, including the NSW Guardianship Board (1990–95) and the NSW Administrative Appeals Tribunal (1991–92). He has sought to make the community more aware of depressive sub-types (especially melancholia) and the bipolar conditions (especially bipolar II disorder) via multiple TV, radio and print interviews and personalised programs (for instance, two ABC Australian Story programs detailing nuances of bipolar II disorder).

During his time at the Black Dog Institute, Parker ‘translated’ research findings via educational programs – some with health professionals in mind and some shaped for the general community. Parker has also developed or evaluated a number of assessment and self-assessment tools to help practitioners and individuals to gauge the type and clinical import of a mood disorder.

== Awards and recognition ==
In 2004, Parker received a Citation Laureate from the Institute for Scientific Information (ISI) as the Australian Scientist most highly cited in the field of “Psychiatry/Psychology”. His citations exceed 35,000.

In 2008, Parker received a Human Rights and Equal Opportunity Commission award for his book: “Journeys with the Black Dog”, and in 2010 his book “Tackling Depression at Work” was short-listed for a further Australian Human Rights Commission award.

In 2017, Parker was awarded the James Cook Medal of the Royal Society of New South Wales for "Outstanding contributions to both science and human welfare in and for the Southern Hemisphere".

Lifetime awards include the RANZCP Senior Psychiatric Research Award (twice), Australasian Society of Psychiatric Research Founders Award, NSW Forensic Psychology Award, UNSW Alumni Award for Science and Technology, Suicide Prevention Lifetime Research Award, and Officer of the Order of Australia in 2010.

The University of NSW awards Scientia Professor status for those academics who have demonstrated "outstanding research performance." Parker was the first clinical academic to be awarded such status in 2000, for a five-year period, and subsequently for three further periods up until 2018.

Parker was a New South Wales finalist in the 2019 Australian of the Year Awards, in the category of Senior Australian of the Year.

== Publications: academic and non-academic ==
Parker has published more than 900 papers, over 600 in peer-reviewed journals; 70 book chapters; and written or edited 18 books. A nearly complete list is available at the UNSW Faculty of Medicine website, Professor Gordon Barraclough Parker publications: More recent publications include "Fecal microbiota transplantation for bipolar disorder: A detailed case study" https://onlinelibrary.wiley.com/doi/epdf/10.1111/bdi.13187 and "Antibiomania: An update" https://journals.sagepub.com/doi/10.1177/10398562251370946 both exploring the role of the gut microbiome in the etiology of bipolar disorder.

== Non-academic output ==
Parker has worked as a creative writer – writing for The Mavis Bramston Show, a cartoonist for Oz magazine and The Bulletin, and a book reviewer for major Australian newspapers. He was an ABC Science broadcaster in Sydney and in London. His play, Personality Games, was staged in 2004 at The Wharf Theatre in Sydney and La Mama's Carlton Courthouse in Melbourne.

== Books ==
- Bed and Bored, Lansdowne Press, Melbourne, 1966.
- The Bonds of Depression, Angus and Robertson, Sydney, 1978.
- Parental Overprotection, Grune and Stratton, NY, 1983.
- Some Rules for Killing People, Ellard J (Parker, ed.) Angus and Robertson, 1989.
- Melancholia: A Disorder of Movement and Mood, (Parker & Hadzi-Pavlovic, eds) Cambridge University Press, NY, 1996.
- Dealing with Depression: a common sense guide to mood disorders, Allen & Unwin, Sydney, 2002.
- Modelling and Managing the Depressive Disorders, Parker and Manicavasagar, Cambridge University Press, Cambridge, 2005.
- Journeys with the Black Dog, Wigney, Eyers & Parker, Allen & Unwin, Sydney, 2007.
- Bipolar II Disorder: Modeling, Measuring and Managing. Cambridge University Press (1st edn, 2008.
- Mastering Bipolar Disorder, Eyers and Parker, Allen & Unwin, Sydney, 2008.
- Navigating Teenage Depression, Parker and Eyers, Allen & Unwin, Sydney, 2009.
- Tackling Depression at Work, Eyers and Parker, Allen & Unwin, Sydney, 2010.
- Managing Depression Growing Older, Eyers, Parker and Brodaty, Allen & Unwin, Sydney, 2012.
- A Piece of My Mind: A Psychiatrist on the Couch, MacMillan, Sydney, 2012.
- Bipolar II Disorder: Modelling, Measuring and Managing. Cambridge University Press (2nd edn), New York, 2012.
- Overcoming Baby Blues, Parker, Eyers and Boyce, Allen & Unwin, Sydney 2014.
- In Two Minds. A Novel, Ventura Press, Sydney 2017.1510
- A Gut-Mood Solution. A Groundbreaking strategy for managing bipolar disorders, Allen & Unwin, Sydney 2025
