= Suzanne Jackson =

Suzanne Jackson may refer to:

- Suzanne Jackson (blogger), Irish blogger and writer
- Suzanne Jackson (artist) (born 1944), American visual artist and gallery owner
