= Paul Kielholz =

Swiss psychiatrist (1916-1990)

Paul Kielholz (15 November 1916 – 25 May 1990) was a Swiss psychiatrist, known mainly for his work on major depression, for example, for his method of overcoming antidepressant resistance by using simultaneous intravenous infusions of clomipramine and maprotiline, together with sulpiride and benzodiazepines. He was born in 1916 in Switzerland.
