= List of University of Florida faculty and administrators =

This list of University of Florida faculty and administrators contains people currently and formerly serving the University of Florida as professors, deans, or in other educational capacities.

== Academic administrators ==
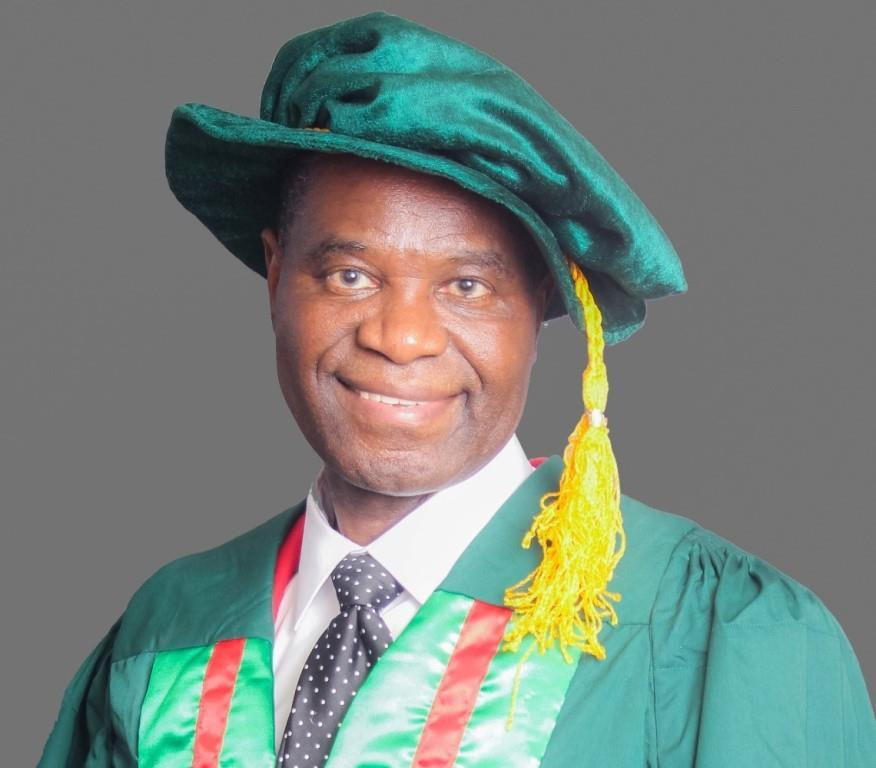
Joseph Abiodun Balogun

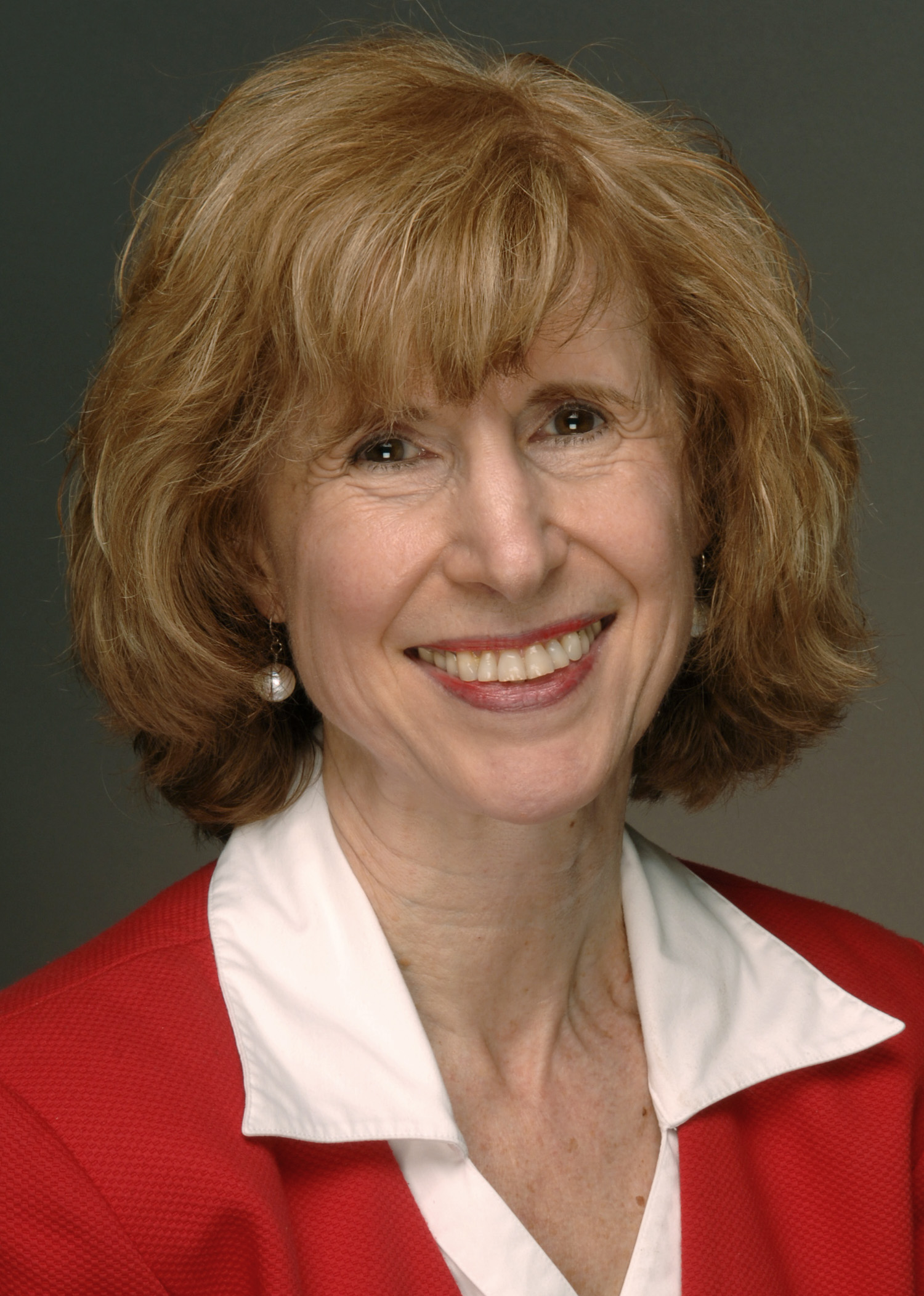
Elizabeth Capaldi

Pramod Khargonekar

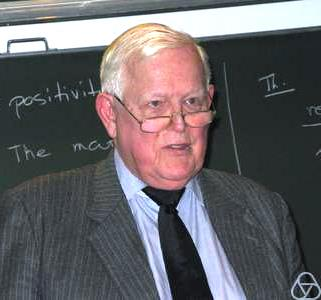
Rudolf Kálmán

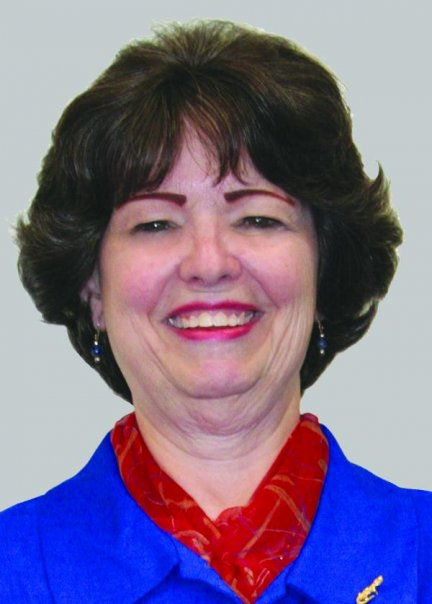
Judith Russell

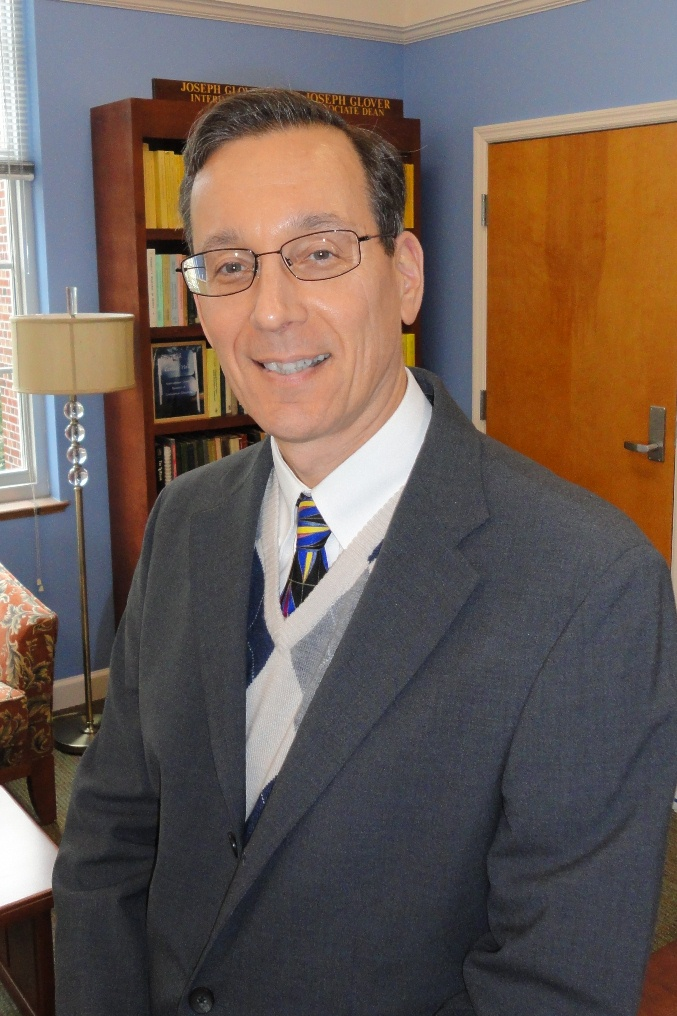
Joseph Glover

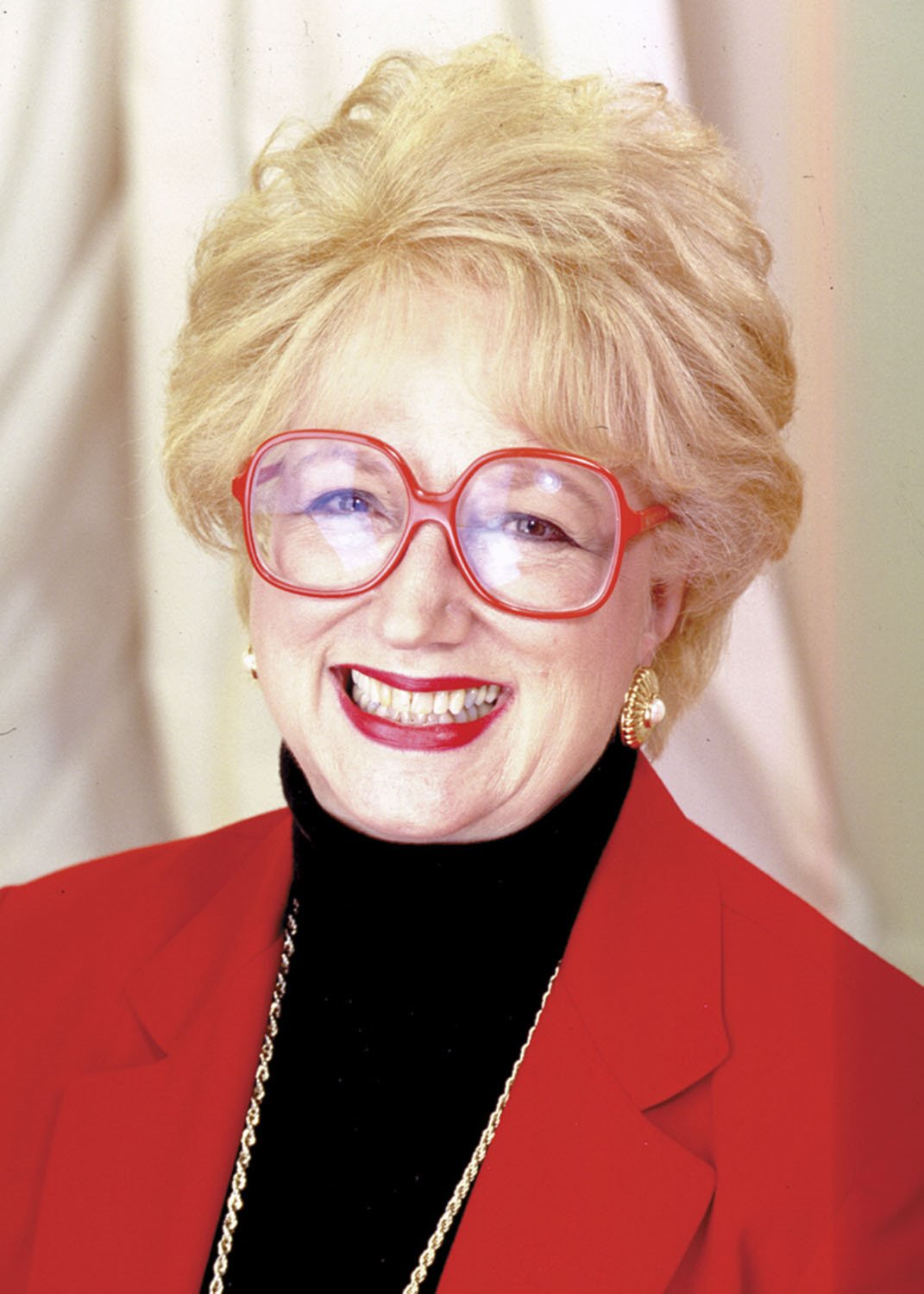
Betty Siegel

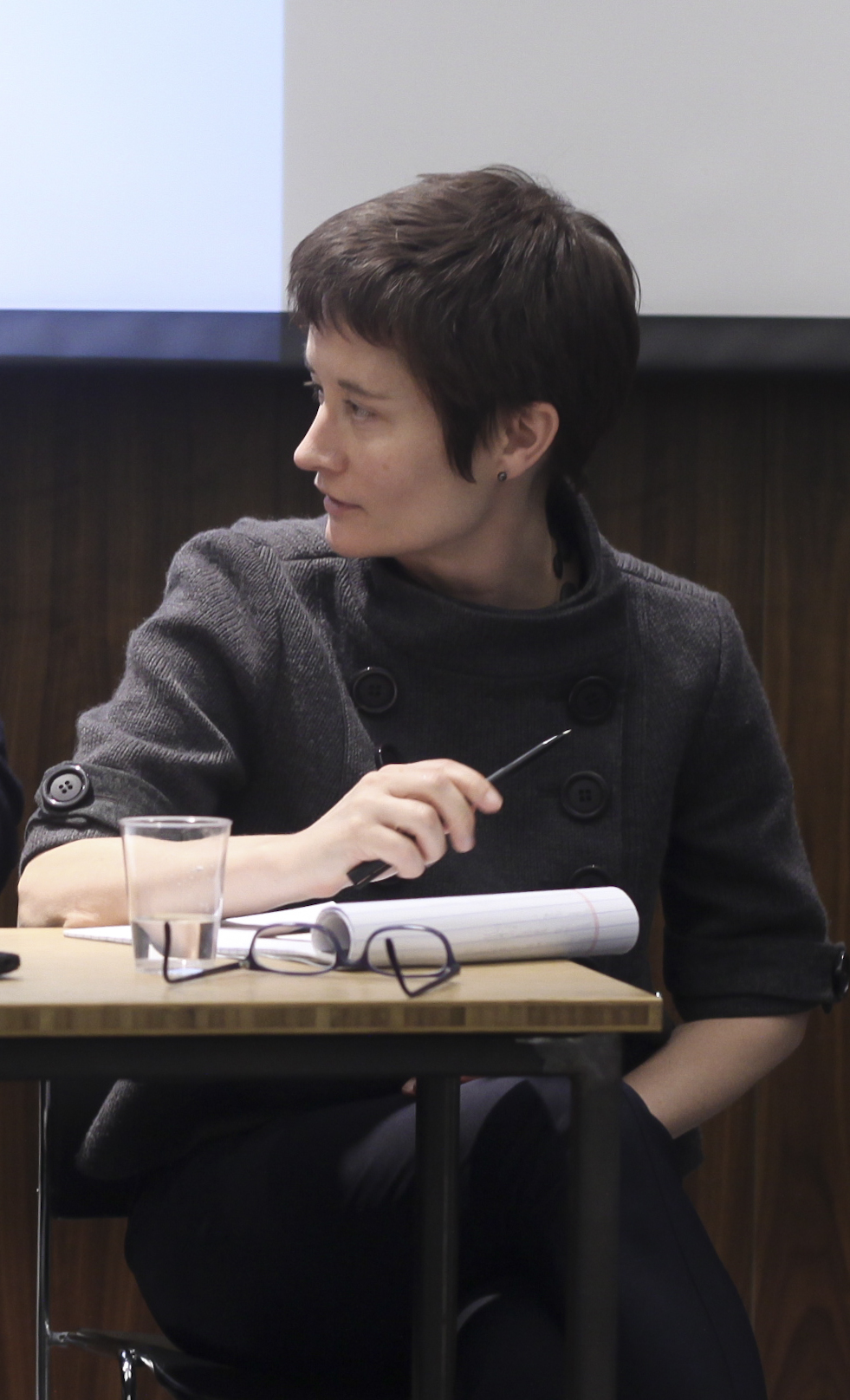
Sarah Whiting

Jeremy Foley

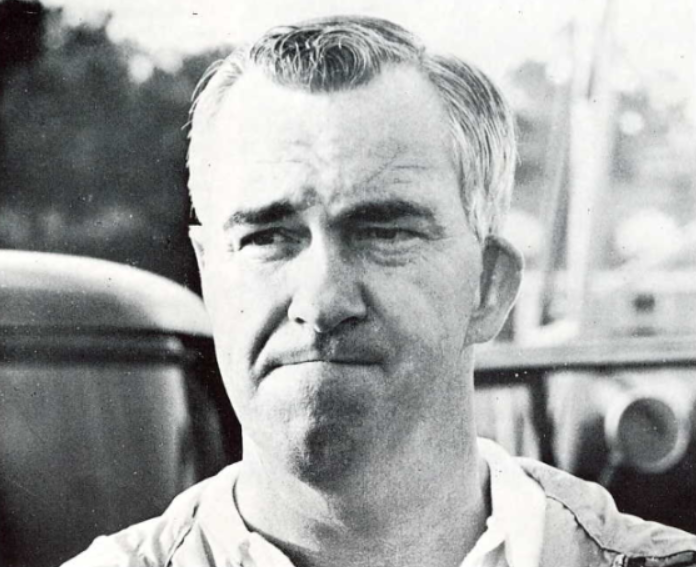
Ray Graves

- Lise Abrams, chair of Linguistics and Cognitive Science at Pomona College
- Ruth H. Alexander, former chair to the Physical Education Department at the University of Florida
- Orland K. Armstrong, founded the University of Florida School of Journalism and former member of the United States House of Representatives
- Sharon Wright Austin, director of the African-American Studies Program at the University of Florida
- George Burgess, world-renowned shark expert; director of International Shark Attack File
- Roy C. Craven, founding director of the University Gallery and art professor
- David R. Colburn, professor of history and author
- Mary Ann Eaverly, chair of the UF Department of Classics
- Stephanie Y. Evans, former director of the Institute for Women's, Gender and Sexuality Studies at Georgia State University
- Albert J. Farrah, founding dean of the University of Florida Levin College of Law
- Mark S. Gold, chairman of Department of Psychiatry and Distinguished Alumni Professor of University of Florida
- Bob Graham, former Florida governor and U.S. senator, founder of Bob Graham Center for Public Service
- Peter E. Hildebrand, director emeritus for the Institute of Food and Agricultural Sciences and professor
- Alice C. Jantzen, former chair of the occupational therapy department
- Rudolf Kálmán, director at Center for Mathematical System Theory and mathematical system theorist, winner of IEEE Medal of Honor, and former graduate research professor
- Nazira Karodia, current Deputy Vice-Chancellor at Edinburgh Napier University
- Kathleen S. Kelly, chair of the Public Relations Department
- Thomas Maren, founding father of the University of Florida College of Medicine, inventor of the drug Trusopt
- William McKeen, professor and chairman of Department of Journalism
- Jerald T. Milanich, anthropologist and archaeologist; curator of archaeology at the Florida Museum of Natural History
- Howard Odum, ecologist; started and directed Center for Environmental Policy at the University of Florida, founded the University's Center for Wetlands in 1973
- John Anderson Palmer, philosopher and chairman of Department of Philosophy
- Leland Patouillet, former director of the University of Florida Alumni Association
- Ernest C. Pollard, professor of physics and biophysics; research scholar
- Sam Proctor, American historian, and founder of the oral history program; first UF Historian and Archivist
- Sartaj Sahni, computer scientist and chairman of the CISE department
- Ivan A. Schulman, former director of the Center for Latin American Studies at UF
- Richard L. Shriner, medical director, Shands Vista Psychiatric Hospital
- David Steadman, curator of ornithology at the Florida Museum of Natural History
- Lee Sweeney, current director of the Myology Institute and professor with the University of Florida College of Medicine
- Malú G. Tansey, current director of UF's Center for Translational Research in Neurodegenerative Disease
- Martin Uman, leading authority on physics of lightning, director of the UF Lightning Research Laboratory
- Baba C. Vemuri, director of Laboratory for Vision Graphics and Medical Imaging at University of Florida and professor
- Sarah Whiting, current director of Princeton University School of Architecture

=== Presidents and chancellors ===
- Stan Albrecht, former researcher for University of Florida College of Medicine, former president of Utah State University
- Kern Alexander, former president of Western Kentucky University and Murray State University
- Samuel A. Banks, former president of Dickinson College and the University of Richmond
- George F. Baughman, former president of New College of Florida, former vice president of business affairs for University of Florida
- Leonard Cheng, current president of Lingnan University (Hong Kong)
- Jimmy Cheek, former professor and chancellor of the University of Tennessee
- Robert G. Frank, former president of the University of New Mexico
- William S. Gaither, former president of Drexel University
- Elizabeth Hoffman, American historian, former president of University of Colorado System, and provost of Iowa State University
- Karen Holbrook, biological scientist, former president of Ohio State University, current vice president of University of South Florida
- Thomas Lyle Martin Jr., former president of the Illinois Institute of Technology
- Robert Mautz, attorney, and former president of State University System of Florida
- Alan Merten, former dean of the College of Business, current president of George Mason University
- Gene Nichol, former law professor, former president of The College of William & Mary
- James L. Oblinger, food scientist, former chancellor of North Carolina State University
- John H. Owen, former president of the University of North Georgia
- Harry M. Philpott, former president of Auburn University
- Laura Rosenbury, current president of Barnard College and former dean of the Levin College of Law
- Eugene G. Sander, former president of the University of Arizona
- Sheldon Schuster, current president of the Keck Graduate Institute
- Wei Shyy, current president of the Hong Kong University of Science and Technology
- Betty Siegel, author, former president of University System of Georgia, former dean of academy affairs for continuing education
- Walter L. Smith, former president of Florida A&M University
- Horace E. Stockbridge, former president of North Dakota State University
- Blake R. Van Leer, Former president of Georgia Institute of Technology and dean of UF College of Engineering
- Sophia Wisniewska, former chancellor of University of South Florida St. Petersburg and Pennsylvania State Brandywine
- Lynn Perry Wooten, current president of Simmons University

=== Provosts and vice presidents ===
- Douglas Barrett, professor of pediatrics, former vice president of J. Hillis Miller Health Science Center
- Betty Capaldi, former provost of Arizona State University and professor at University of Florida
- Joseph Glover, current provost and former dean of the University of Florida College of Liberal Arts and Sciences
- David Guzick, current vice president of J. Hillis Miller Health Science Center
- Gillian Small, current provost for Fairleigh Dickinson University

=== Deans ===
- Reza Abbaschian, Iranian/American engineer and former dean of the Bourns College of Engineering
- Joseph Abiodun Balogun, former dean of the College of Health Sciences at Chicago State University
- Cammy Abernathy, current dean of the University of Florida College of Engineering
- Earl C. Arnold, academic administrator and former dean of the Vanderbilt University Law School
- Jay M. Bernhardt, current dean of the Moody College of Communication at the University of Texas
- Anthony Catanese, professor of architecture, former dean of the College of Architecture, current president of Florida Institute of Technology
- Jennifer Sinclair Curtis, former dean of University of California, Davis College of Engineering
- Paul D'Anieri, former dean of University of Florida College of Liberal Arts and Sciences
- Teresa Dolan, current dean of University of Florida College of Dentistry
- Catherine Emihovich, former dean of University of Florida College of Education
- Isabel Garcia, current dean of the University of Florida College of Dentistry
- Glenn E. Good, current dean of the University of Florida College of Education
- Michael Good, former dean of University of Florida College of Medicine
- Robert Jerry, former dean of University of Florida Levin College of Law
- Dennis Jett, diplomat and academic; former dean of University of Florida International Center
- Pramod Khargonekar, former dean of University of Florida College of Engineering
- Colleen G. Koch, current dean of the University of Florida College of Medicine
- Bruce C. Kone, former dean of the University of Florida College of Medicine and professor of medicine at the University of Texas Health Science Center at Houston
- John Kraft, current dean of the Warrington College of Business Administration
- Ralph Lowenstein, former dean of the University of Florida College of Journalism and Communications
- Michele Manuel, materials scientist and dean of the University of Pittsburgh College of Engineering
- Thomas Lyle Martin Jr., former dean of University of Florida College of Engineering, former president of Illinois Institute of Technology
- Roderick McDavis, former dean of University of Florida College of Education, current president of Ohio University
- Diane McFarlin, current dean of the University of Florida College of Journalism and Communications
- Jon L. Mills, former dean of the Levin College of Law and speaker for the Florida House of Representatives
- Saby Mitra, current dean of the Warrington College of Business
- Eileen Oliver, current interim dean of the University of Florida Division of Continuing Education
- Onye P. Ozuzu, current dean of the University of Florida College of the Arts
- Peter Henry Rolfs, agronomist, former dean of College of Agriculture and Life Sciences
- Judith Russell, current dean of University of Florida Library System
- Andrew P. Sage, former dean of the School of Information Technology and Engineering of the George Mason University
- Gillian Small, biologist, current dean of research at the City University of New York
- Dennis K. Stanley, former dean of the University of Florida College of Health and Human Performance
- Neil Sullivan, current professor of physics, former dean of University of Florida College of Liberal Arts and Sciences
- Blake Ragsdale Van Leer, former dean of Engineering at University of Florida and president of Georgia Tech
- Sarah Whiting, current dean of the Rice University School of Architecture

=== Athletic directors ===
- Alfred Buser, 1917–1920
- William Kline, 1920–1923
- James White, 1923–1925
- Everett Yon, 1925–1928
- Charlie Bachman, 1928–1930
- Edgar Jones, 1930–1936
- Josh Cody, 1936–1939
- Tom Lieb, 1940–1945
- Raymond Wolf, 1946–1949
- Bob Woodruff, 1950–1959
- Ray Graves, 1960–1979
- Bill Carr, 1979–1986
- Bill Arnsparger, 1986–1992
- Jeremy Foley, 1992–2016
- Scott Stricklin, 2016–present

== Distinguished professors ==
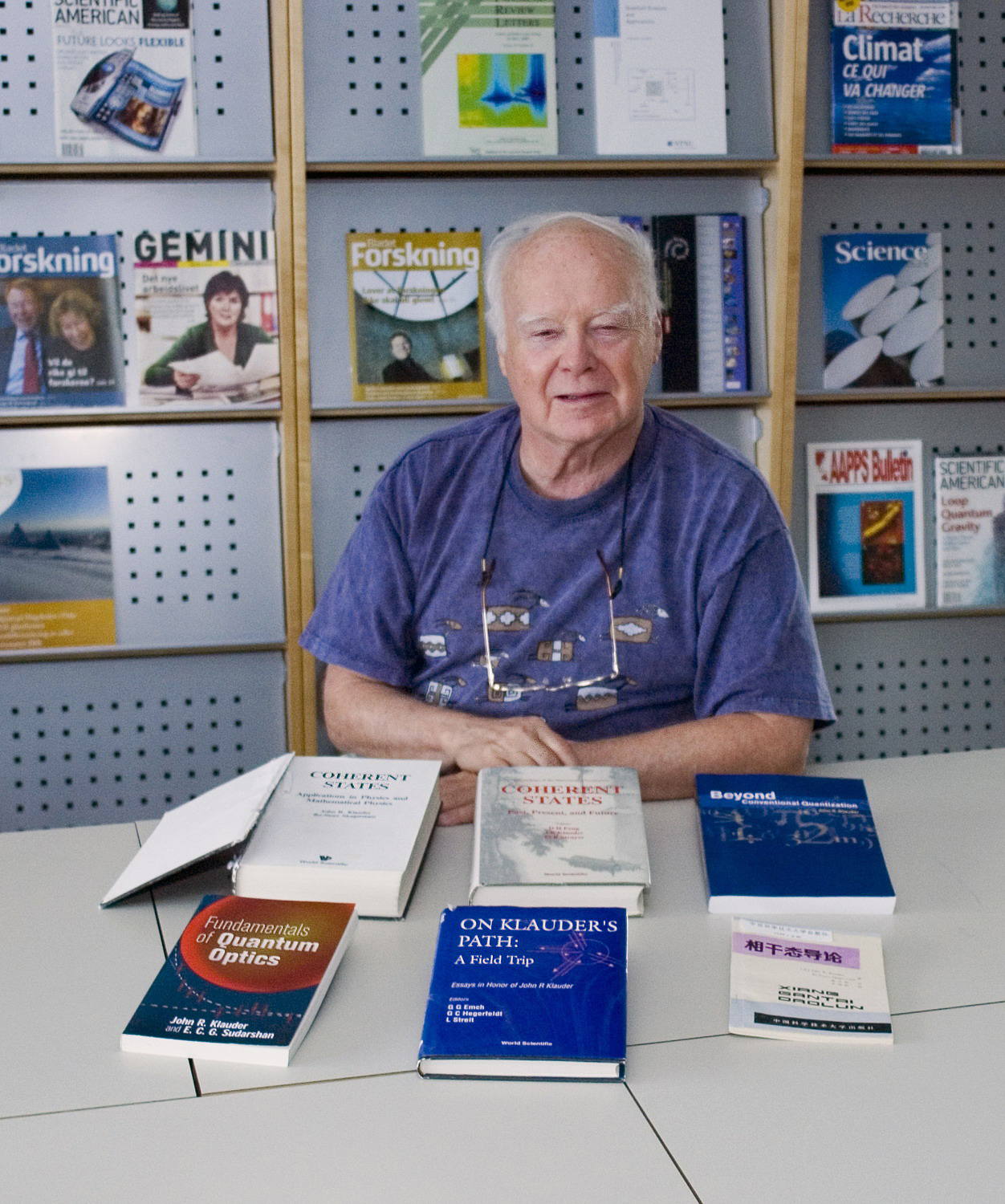
John Klauder

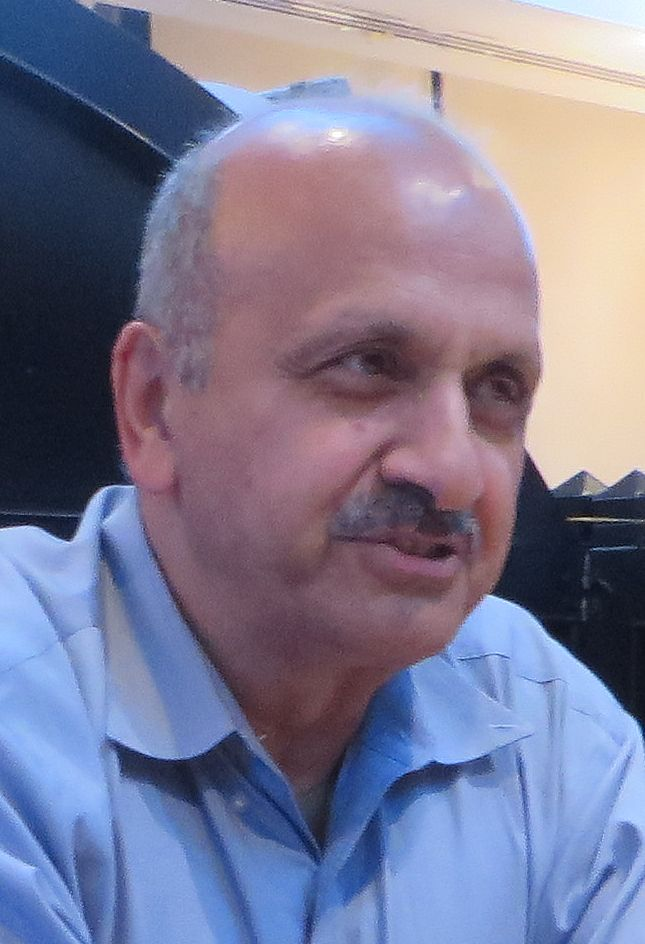
Sartaj Sahni

- Barry Ache, Distinguished Professor of Biology and Neuroscience at the Whitney Laboratory for Marine Bioscience
- Michael S. Okun, Distinguished Professor of Neuroscience
- Alan Agresti, Distinguished Professor of Statistics
- Kenneth Berns, Distinguished Professor of Molecular Genetics and Microbiology
- George Casella, former Distinguished Professor in the Department of Statistics at the University of Florida
- George Christou, currently the Drago and Distinguished Professor at the University of Florida
- Hartmut Derendorf, Distinguished professor of Pharmaceutical Sciences
- Roger Fillingim, Distinguished Professor and psychologist
- Malay Ghosh, Distinguished Professor and Indian statistician
- Jeff Gill, Distinguished Professor of Government
- Mark S. Gold, Distinguished Professor and chairman, Department of Psychiatry
- Raphael Haftka, Distinguished Professor of Engineering
- Peter J. Hansen, Distinguished Professor of Animal Sciences
- Arthur F Hebard, Distinguished Professor of Physics
- Peter Hirschfeld, Distinguished Professor of Physics
- Brian Iwata, Distinguished Professor of Psychology
- Walter Stephen Judd, Distinguished Professor of Botany
- John R. Klauder, Distinguished Professor, Physics and Math, Department of Physics
- Louis J. Lanzerotti, Distinguished Professor of Physics
- Mark Law, Distinguished Professor of Engineering
- Phil Lounibos, Distinguished Professor of Entomology
- Charles R. Martin, Distinguished Professor of Chemistry
- Bruce MacFadden, Distinguished Professor of Paleontology
- Guenakh Mitselmakher, Distinguished Professor of Physics
- Leonid Moroz, Distinguished Professor of Neuroscience
- Brij Moudgil, Distinguished Professor of Material Science
- P. K. Ramachandran Nair, Distinguished Professor of Agroforestry and International Forestry
- Mark Orazem, Distinguished Professor of Engineering
- Panos M. Pardalos, Distinguished Professor of Engineering
- Stephen Pearton, Distinguished Professor of Engineering and Material Science
- Scott Powers, Distinguished Professor of Psychology
- Jose Principe, Distinguished Professor of Biomedical Engineering
- Ann Progulske-Fox, Distinguished Professor of Dentistry and program director
- Pierre Ramond, Distinguished Professor of Physics
- Fan Ren, Distinguished Professor of Engineering
- Sartaj Sahni, Distinguished Professor of Computer Science
- Kirk Schanze, Distinguished Professor of Chemistry
- Pierre Sikivie, Distinguished Professor of Physics
- Paul Sindelar, Distinguished Professor of Education
- Douglas E. Soltis, Distinguished Professor with the Florida Museum of Natural History
- Pamela S. Soltis, Distinguished Professor with the Florida Museum of Natural History
- Weihong Tan, Distinguished Professor of Chemistry
- David B. Tanner, Distinguished Professor of Physics
- Leslie Thiele, Distinguished Professor of Political Science
- Martin A. Uman, Distinguished Professor of Engineering
- Clifford Martin Will, Distinguished Professor, Department of Physics

== Professors and faculty ==
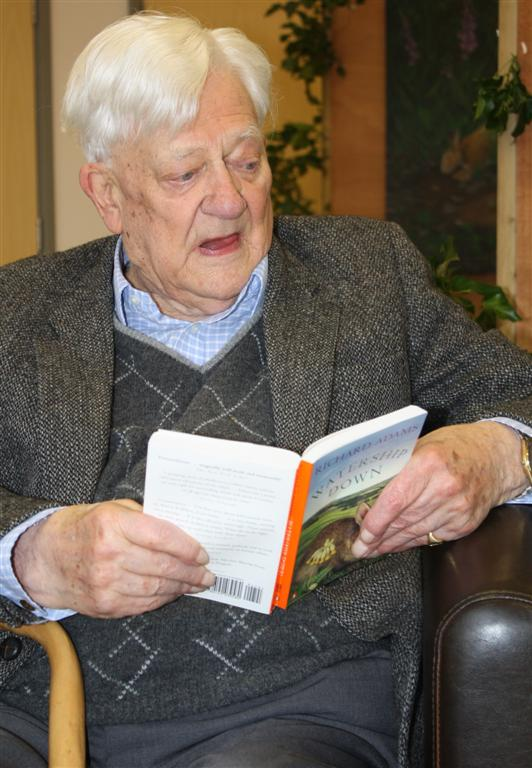
Richard Adams

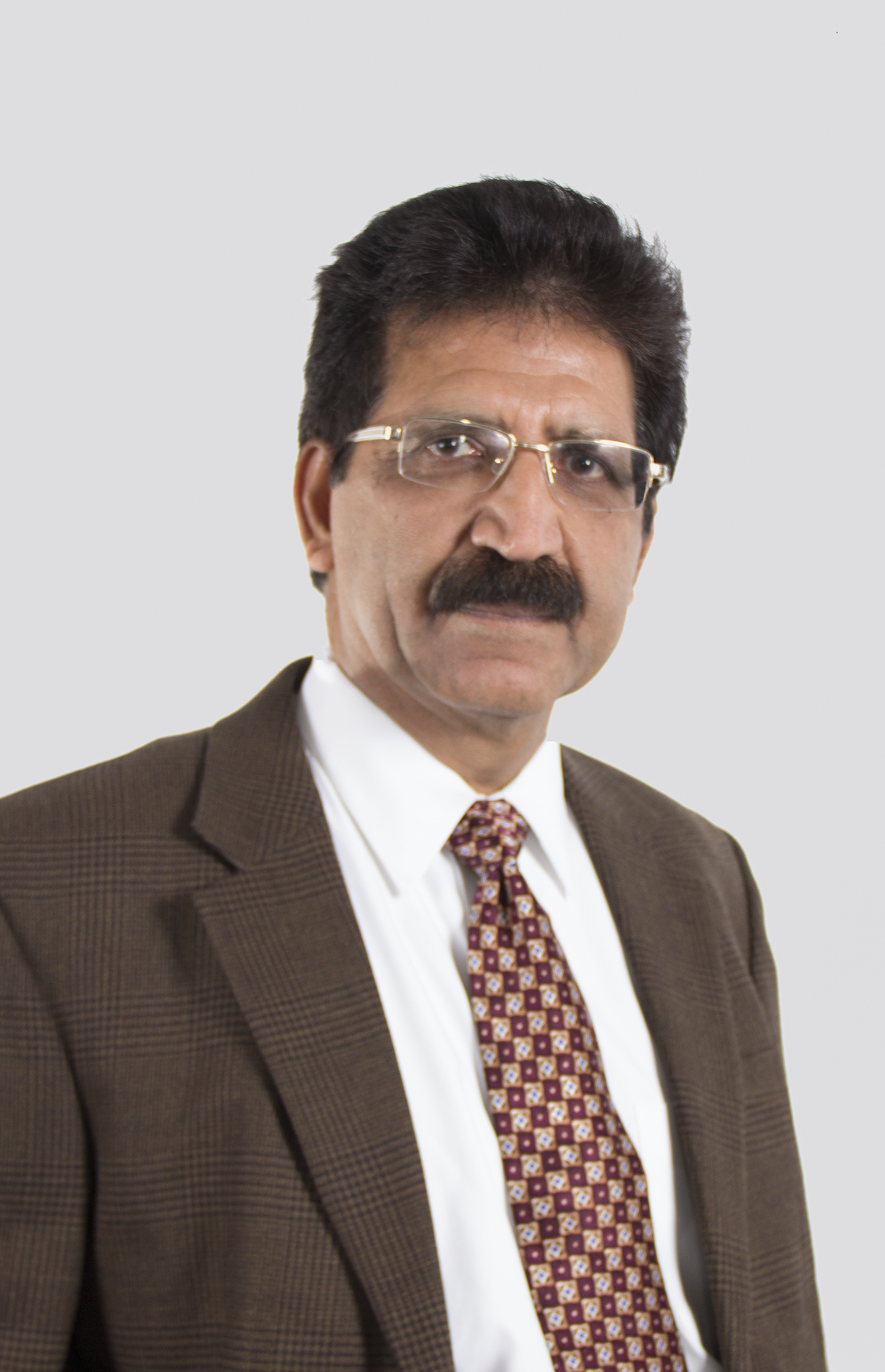
Ravindra Ahuja

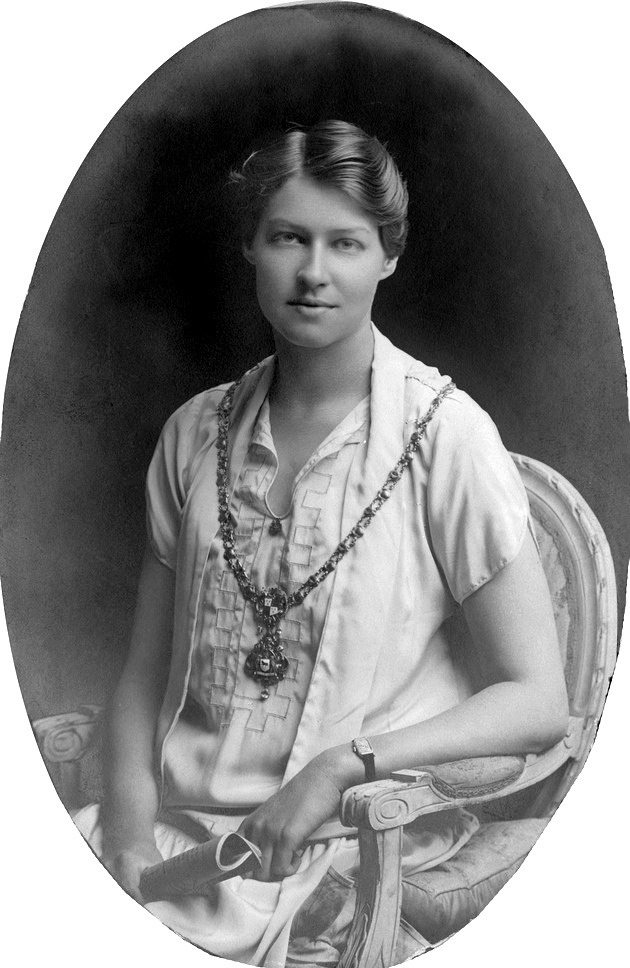
Gwendolen Carter

Martha Ellen Davis

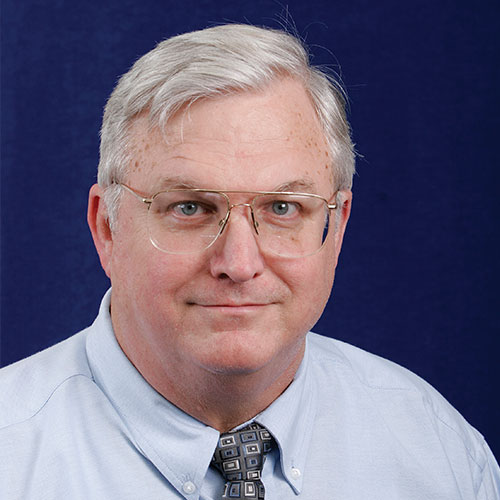
George Dekle

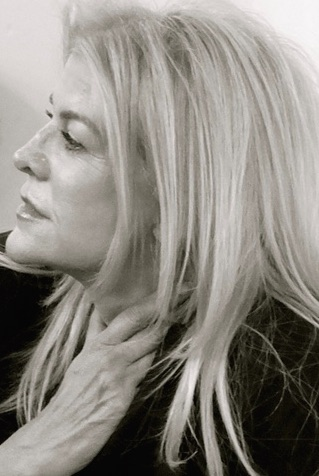
Jane Douglas

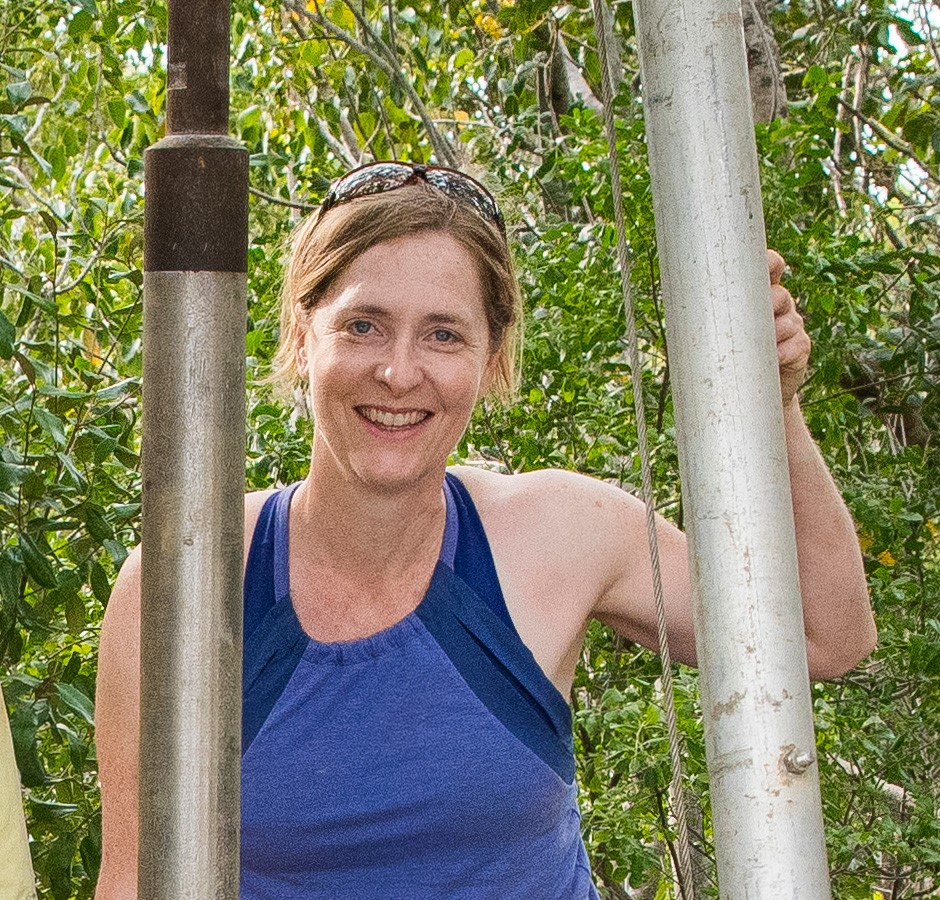
Andrea Dutton

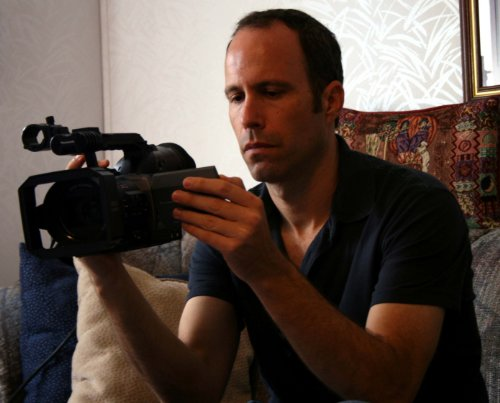
Boaz Dvir

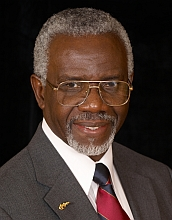
Jonathan Earle

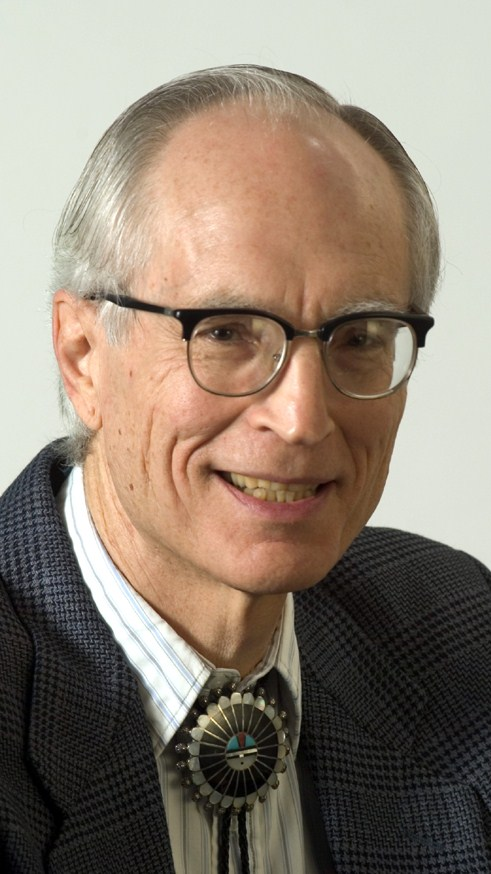
Joe Feagin

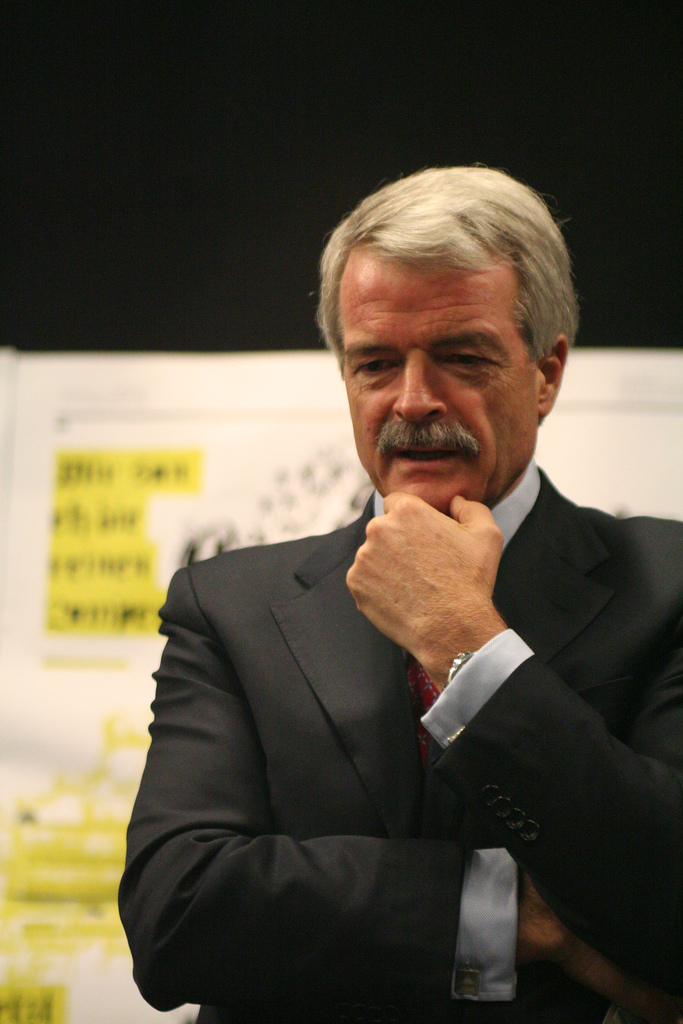
Malcolm Grant

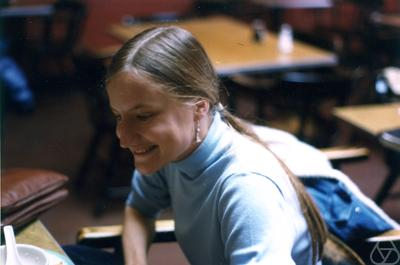
Jean Larson

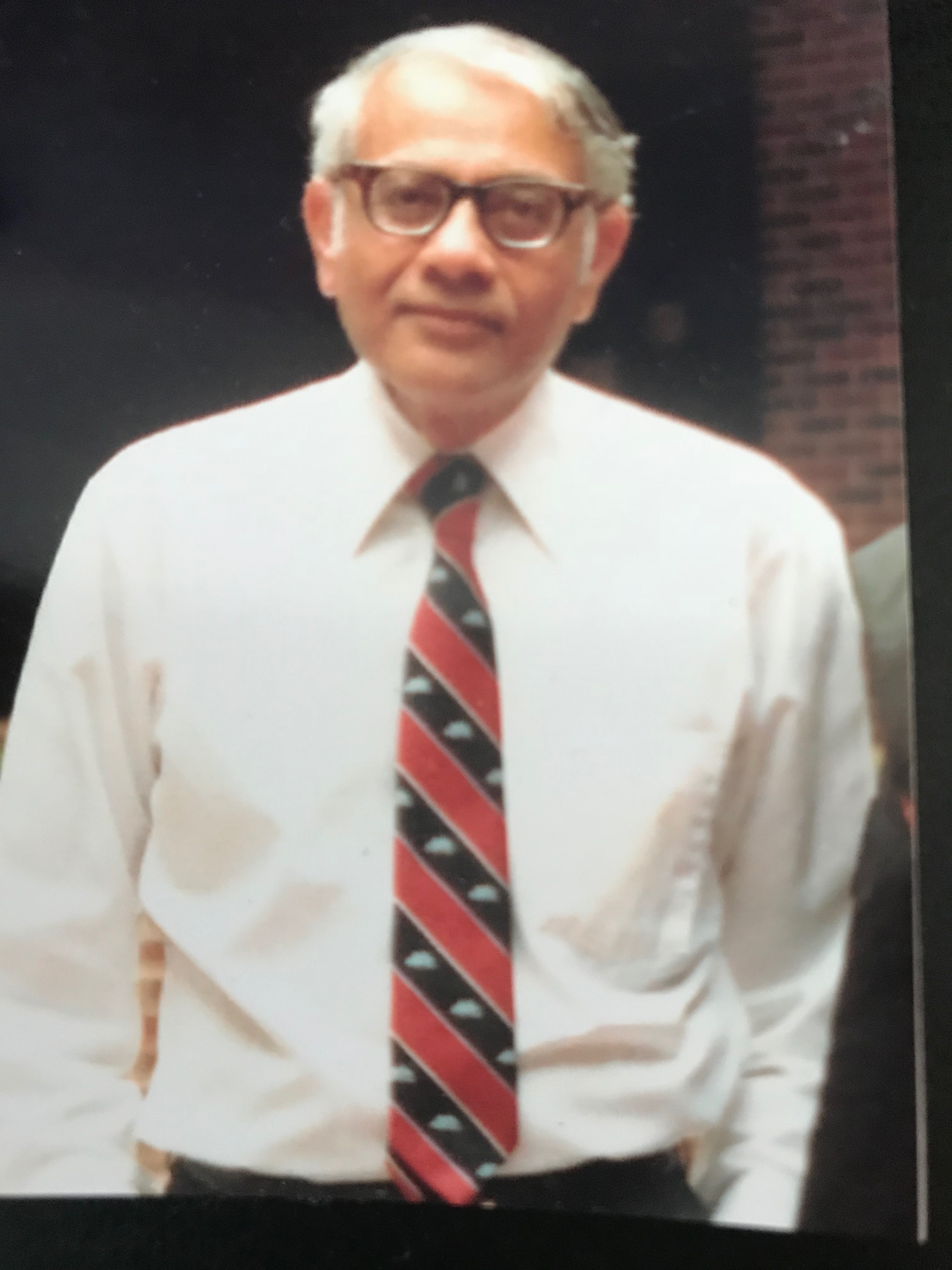
G. S. Maddala

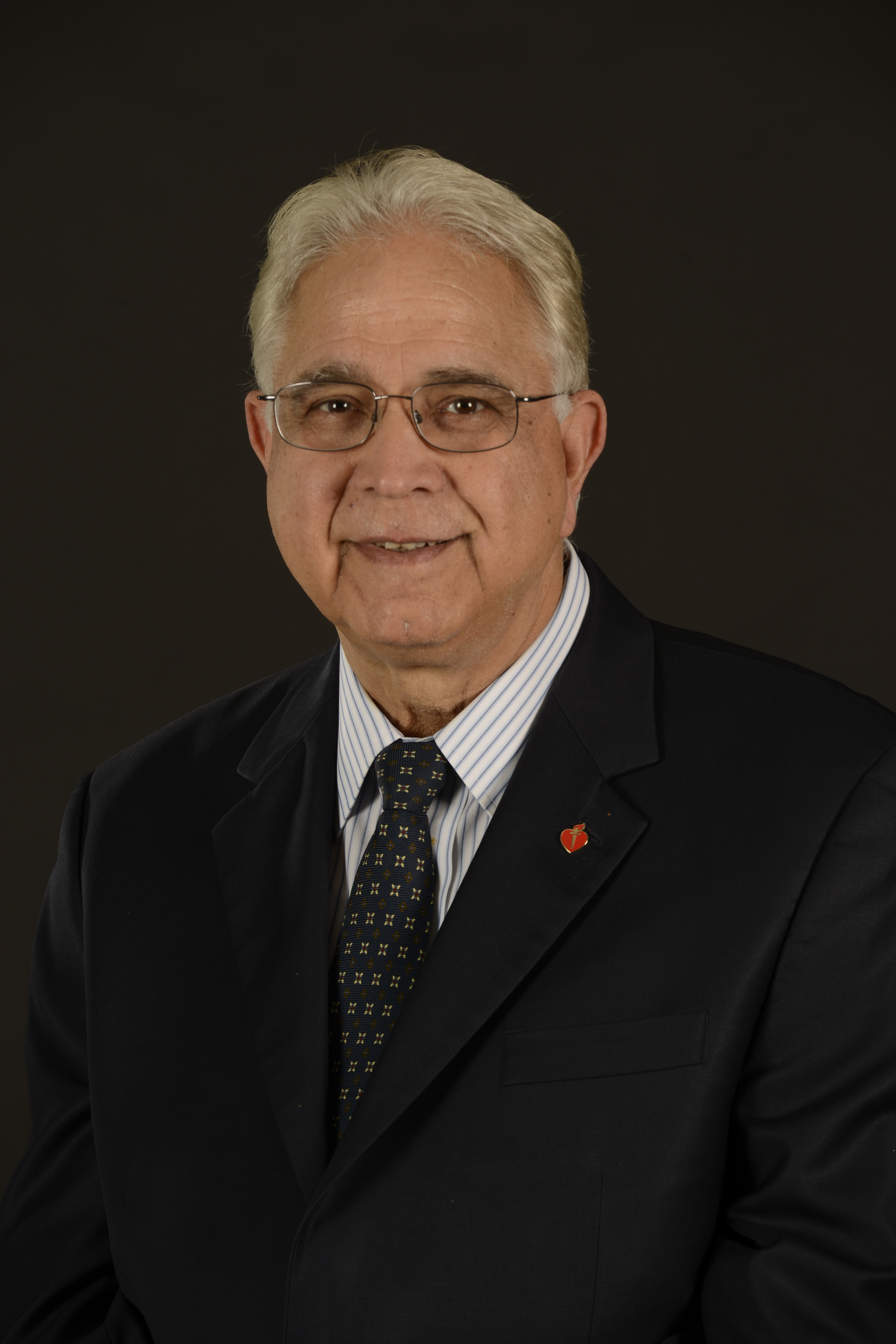
Jawahar Mehta

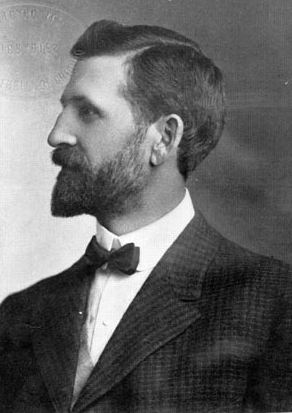
William Murrill

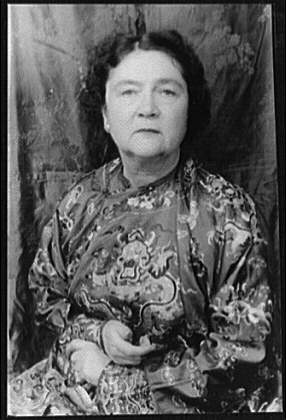
Marjorie Rawlings

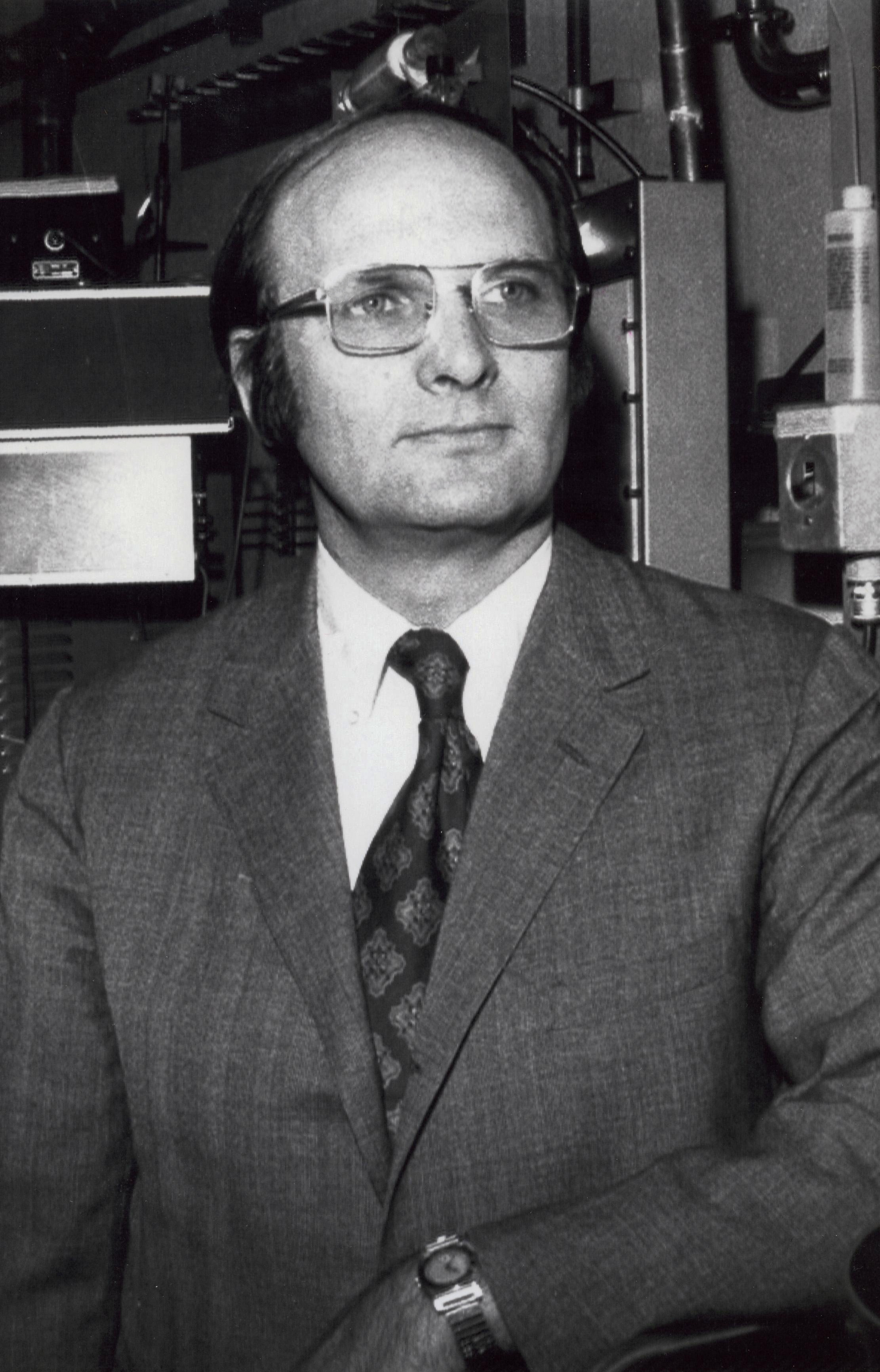
John Schrieffer

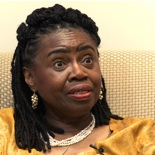
Gwendolyn Zoharah Simmons

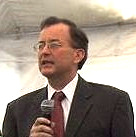
Ottón Solís

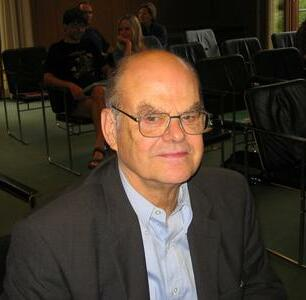
John Thompson

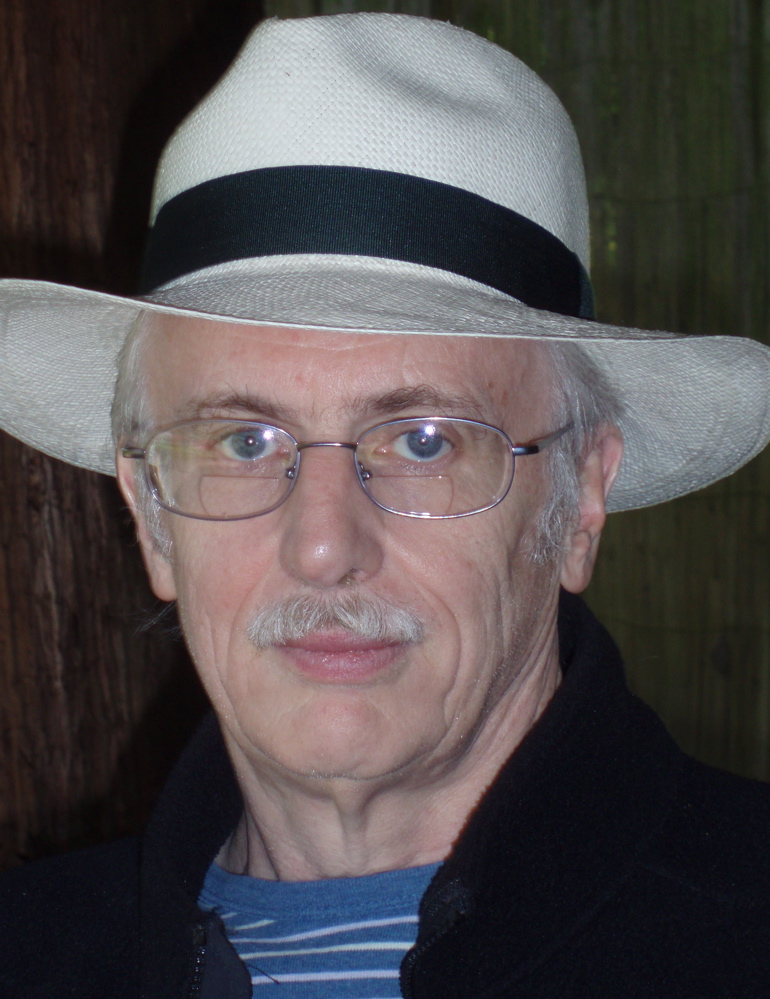
Charles Thorn

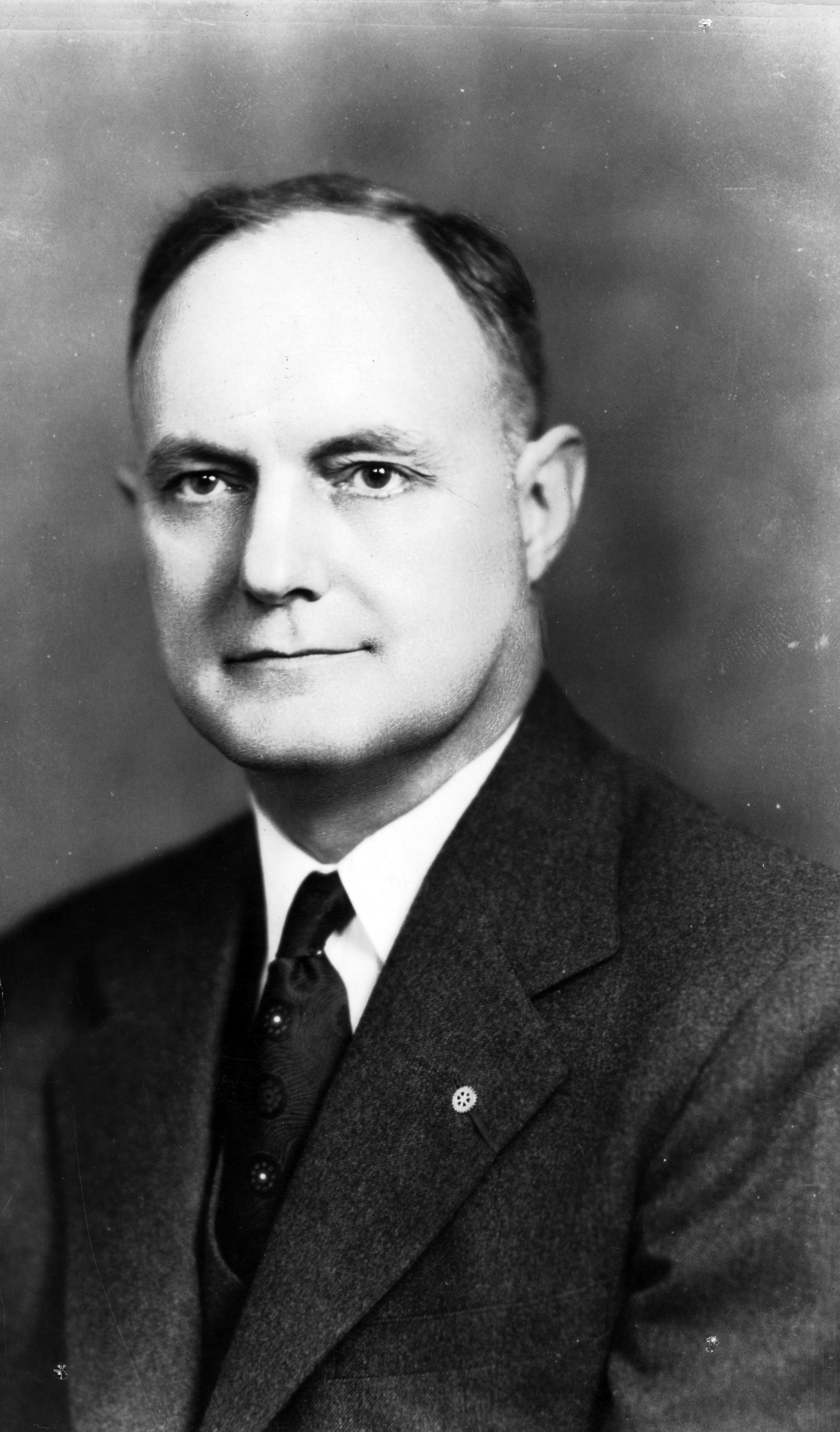
Blake Ragsdale Van Leer

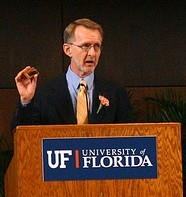
Carl Van Ness

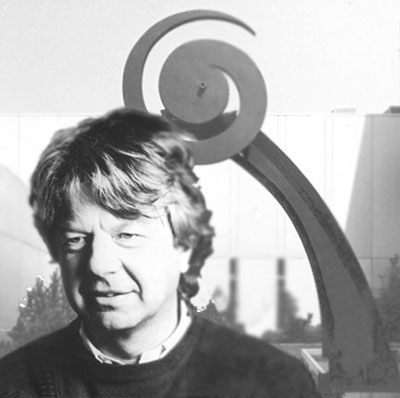
Harald von Boehmer

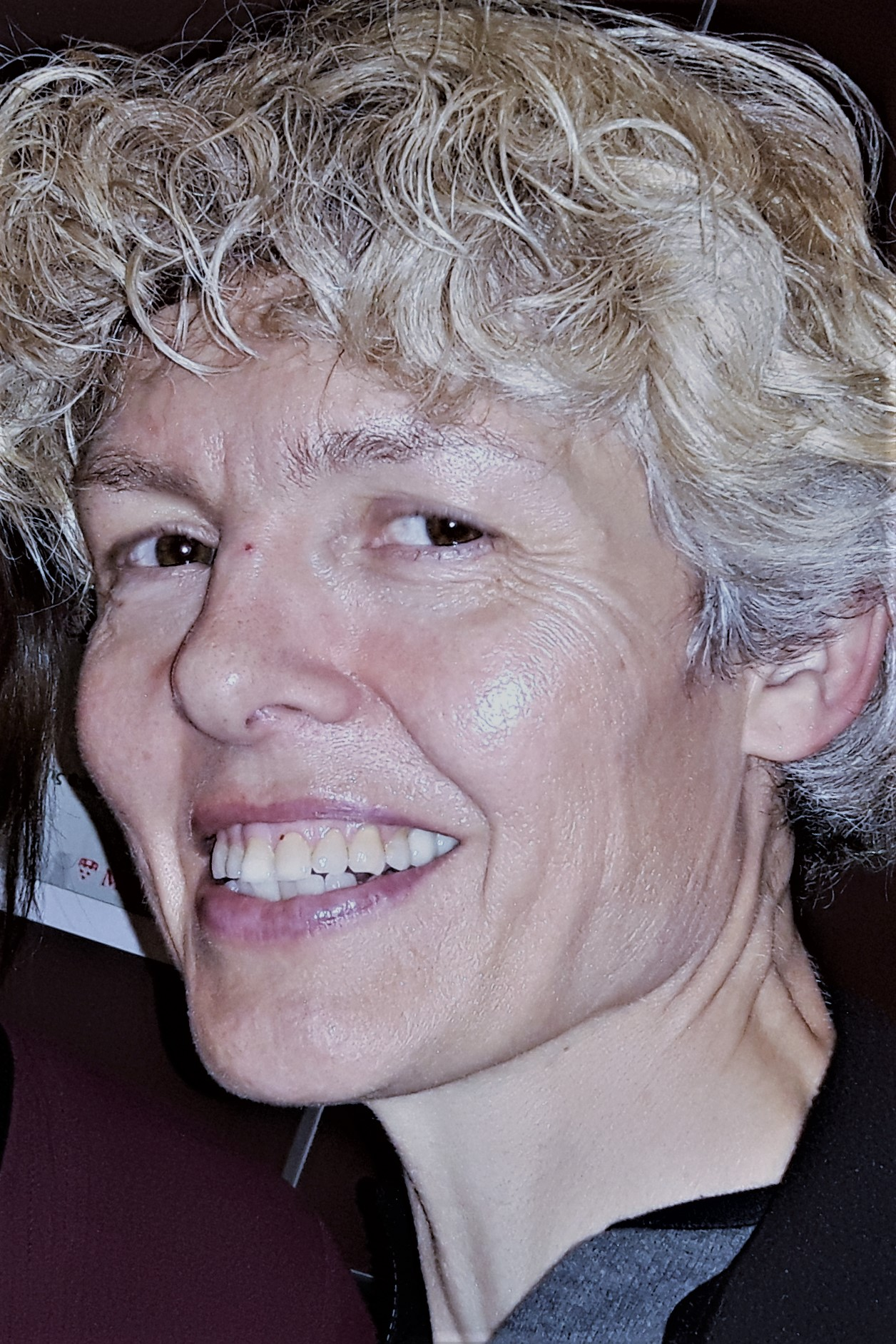
Gonda Van Steen

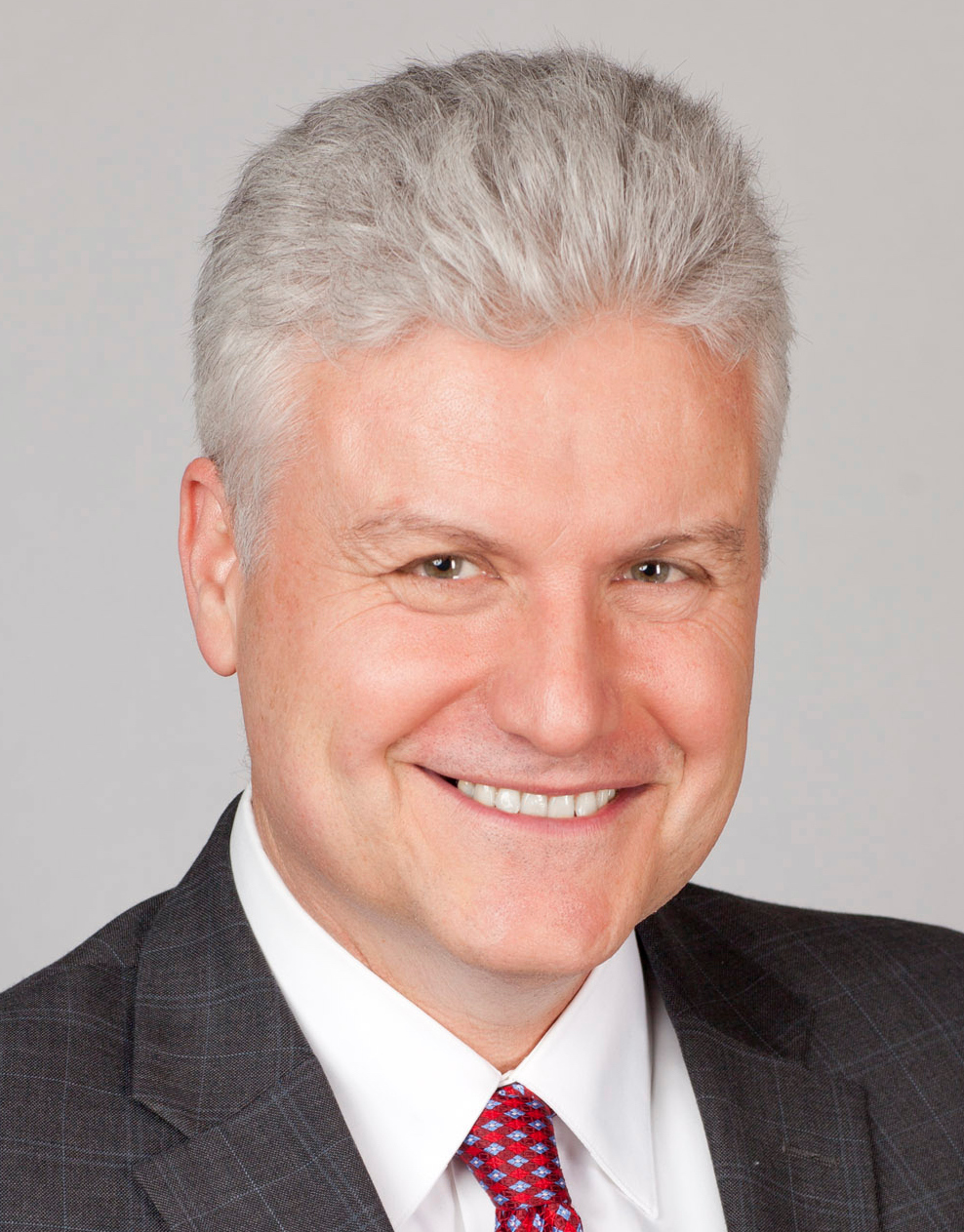
Johannes Vieweg

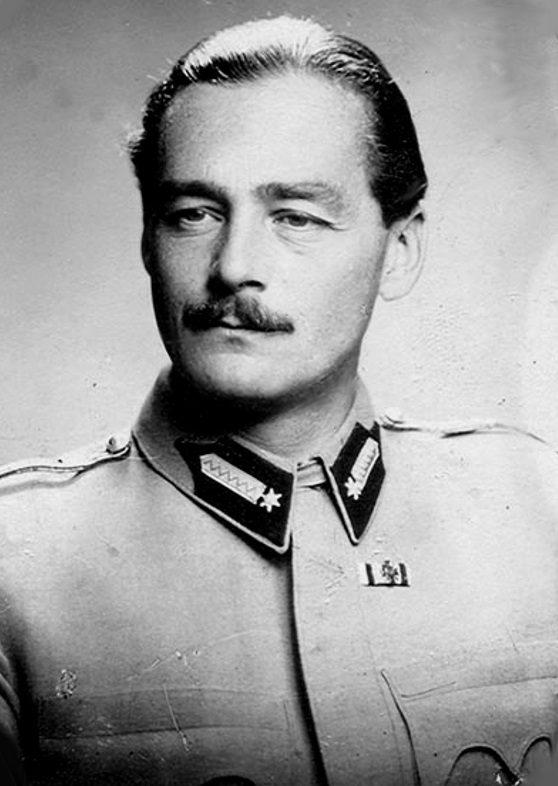
Albert Wass

A

- Richard Adams, English novelist
- Sean Adams, historian who specializes in the history of American capitalism and energy
- Kole Ade-Odutola, poet
- Mavis Agbandje-McKenna, medical biophysicist, structural virologist, and a professor of structural biology
- Rajshree Agarwal, economist
- Ravindra K. Ahuja, computer scientist
- Ronald Akers, criminologist and professor emeritus of criminology and law
- Dolores Albarracín, psychologist, author and professor of psychology
- John Algeo, former assistant dean of the graduate school and professor of English
- Krishnaswami Alladi, Indian-American mathematician who specializes in number theory
- Warder Clyde Allee, zoologist
- Ida Altman, historian of colonial Spain and Latin America
- Terry A. Anderson, journalist
- Thomas E. Angelini, physicist
- Dominick Angiolillo, Italian cardiologist
- Lisa Anthony, computer scientist
- Susan C. Antón, biological anthropologist and paleoanthropologist
- George J. Armelagos, anthropologist, and Goodrich C. White Professor of Anthropology at Emory University
- Donald Ault, professor of English at the University of Florida
- James H. Austin, neurologist and author

B

- Florence Babb, anthropologist, author, and editor
- Stanley Ballard, physicist specializing in optics
- Aida Bamia, professor of Arabic language and literature
- Enoch Marvin Banks, historian
- Turpin Bannister, architectural historian
- Barbara Barletta, classical archaeologist and architectural historian
- Rodney J. Bartlett, professor of Chemistry and Physics
- Linda Bartoshuk, Presidential Endowed Professor of Community Dentistry and Behavioral Sciences
- Merle Battiste, chemist and emeritus professor of Chemistry at the University of Florida
- Fuller Bazer, animal scientist and Regents Fellow
- Robert de Beaugrande, professor of English Linguistics
- Leonard Beeghley, sociologist
- Cynthia D. Belar, clinical psychologist
- Steven Albert Benner, molecular biologist
- Kenneth Berns, virologist
- Suresh Kumar Bhatia, chemical engineer, academic, Shanti Swarup Bhatnagar laureate
- Thomas S. Bianchi, oceanographer and biogeochemist
- Buster Bishop, physical education professor and coach for the Florida Gators men's golf team
- Karen Bjorndal, biologist
- William T. Blackstone, academic and philosopher
- Meredith Blackwell, mycologist
- David Boger, Australian chemical engineer
- Miklós Bóna, mathematician
- Camille Bordas, French writer
- H. Jane Brockmann, biologist and fellow of the American Association for the Advancement of Science
- James Broselow, clinical associate professor of Emergency Medicine in the Department of Emergency Medicine at the University of Florida College of Medicine
- Babette Brumback, biostatistician known for her work on causal inference
- W. Fitzhugh Brundage, historian
- Stuart Buchanan, voice actor, announcer, and educator
- George H. Burgess, ichthyologist and fisheries biologist with the Florida Museum of Natural History
- Karen C. Burke, legal scholar
- Robert Burne, microbiologist
- David Bushell, Latin American historian, one of the first Americans to study Colombia
- Barry J. Byrne, clinician-scientist

C

- Robert Cade, co-inventor of Gatorade
- William Calin, senior scholar of Medieval French literature and French poetry at the University of Florida
- Clay Calvert, mass communications scholar
- Pierre Capretz, professor of French
- Archie Carr, zoologist, conservationist, and founder of the Caribbean Conservation Corporation
- Gwendolen M. Carter, Canadian-American political scientist
- Jean C. Chance, professor of Journalism
- Colin Chapman, professor and Canada Research Chair in Primate Ecology and Conservation at McGill University
- Raghavan Charudattan, plant pathologist
- Hai-Ping Cheng, Chinese-American physicist
- Shigang Chen, Fellow of the Institute of Electrical and Electronics Engineers
- Paul Chun, professor of thermodynamics
- John Ciardi, etymologist
- Jill Ciment, writer and Guggenheim Fellow
- Ronald A. Cohen, neuropsychologist and Evelyn F. McKnight chair for clinical translational research in cognitive aging and memory
- Theo Colborn, zoologist and environmental health analyst
- Coray Colina, professor of chemistry
- David Copp, Canadian philosopher
- Leela Corman, cartoonist and illustrator
- Robert J. Cousins, nutritional biochemist
- Suzy Covey, comics scholar and former university librarian emerita
- Patricia Craddock, author and professor of English
- Harry Crews, novelist
- Darlena Cunha, freelance journalist, blogger, and writer
- Barbara Curbow, social/health psychologist
- Florin Curta, Romanian historian, medievalist and archaeologist on Eastern Europe
- Roy Curtiss, microbiologist

D

- Robert Dana, poet
- Radhika Ramana Dasa, Vaishnava scholar
- Susmita Datta, professor of biostatistics at the University of Florida
- Manning J. Dauer, political scientist, developed the 1967 reapportionment plan for Florida
- Paul W. Davenport, physiologist
- H. G. Davis Jr., journalist
- Jack E. Davis, environmental history and sustainability studies professor
- Martha Ellen Davis, anthropologist and ethnomusicologist
- Kathleen A. Deagan, archaeologist
- Natalie Dean, biostatistician specializing in infectious disease epidemiology
- George R. Dekle Sr., legal skills professor at the Levin College of Law
- Steven T. DeKosky, medical researcher and academic known for his work in the field of Alzheimer's disease
- Joel S. Demski, accounting researcher and educator
- Stanley Dermott, astronomer
- Michael J. S. Dewar, Indian theoretical chemist
- Donald Dewsbury, comparative psychologist and historian of psychology
- Nils J. Diaz, former chairman of the Nuclear Regulatory Commission
- James Dickey, novelist
- William Ditto, biomedical engineer
- Lawrence Dodd, political scientist and Manning J. Dauer Eminent Scholar in Political Science
- Ngô Đồng, entomologist and nematologist
- Jane Douglas, Professor of Management Communication
- Russell S. Drago, professor of inorganic chemistry
- Lester Dragstedt, surgeon and professor
- Alexander Dranishnikov, Russian-American mathematician
- Daniel C. Drucker, mechanical engineer, known for contributions to the theory of plasticity
- George L. Drusano, physician and medical researcher
- Stewart Duncan, philosopher known for contributions on philosophy of Thomas Hobbes
- Andrea Dutton, geologist
- Boaz Dvir, Israeli-American professor, journalist, and filmmaker

E

- Jonathan F. Earle, professor of Engineering
- Lily Elefteriadou, civil engineer
- William F. Enneking, orthopaedic oncologist
- Dorothy Espelage, psychologist
- Georg Essl, Austrian computer scientist and musician
- John Ewel, biologist
- Katherine Ewel, ecosystem, forest, and wetlands ecologist
- Sheila Eyberg, clinical and health psychologist

F

- Charles H. Fairbanks, archaeologist and anthropologist
- Albert Fathi, Egyptian-French mathematician
- Joe Feagin, sociologist and social theorist
- Mark Fenster, attorney and professor with the Levin College of Law
- Richard D. Field, physicist
- Mark Flannery, economist
- Kevin Folta, professor and chairman of the horticultural sciences department at the University of Florida
- Jerry G. Fossum, electrical engineer
- Jamie S. Foster, astrobiologist, microbiologist, and academic
- David J. Foulis, mathematician
- Christine A. Franklin, statistics educator
- Stan Franklin, scientist

G

- Robert B. Gaither, mechanical engineer, professor and chairman of the Department of Mechanical Engineering at the University of Florida College of Engineering
- Thomas Gallant, historian who specializes in modern Greek history and archaeology
- J. Matthew Gallman, educator and author of books about nineteenth-century history
- Michael Gannon, historian, former priest and author
- Jeremy Gardiner, contemporary British landscape painter
- Frank Garvan, Australian-born mathematician who specializes in number theory and combinatorics
- Robert Franklin Gates, muralist, painter, and art professor
- Patrick J. Geary, medieval historian
- Alan Dale George, Fellow of the Institute of Electrical and Electronics Engineers
- Geoffrey J. Giles, historian
- Susan D. Gillespie, anthropologist and archaeologist
- Mark S. Gold, researcher and author
- Maureen Goodenow, scientist and professor of Pathology, Immunology, and Laboratory Medicine
- Hridayananda das Goswami, Vaishnava philosopher
- Malcolm Grant, former professor and current president of University College London
- Susan Greenbaum, anthropologist
- Debora Greger, poet and visual artist
- David Grove, anthropologist, archaeologist, and academic
- Jaber F. Gubrium, sociologist
- Lillian Guerra, professor of History and widely published author and speaker
- Louis J. Guillette Jr, former professor of embryology

H

- Thomas Louis Hanna, philosopher
- Peter J. Hansen, animal scientist and physiologist
- R. M. Hare, English moral philosopher
- Mike Haridopolos, faculty member at the Bob Graham Center for Public Service
- Willis Harman, social scientist and futurist
- George Mills Harper, literary scholar
- Marvin Harris, anthropologist
- Molly Harrower, South African clinical psychologist
- Melissa Hart, actress, singer, and teacher
- Todd Hasak-Lowy, formerly associate professor of Hebrew Literature at the University of Florida
- Kenneth Heilman, behavioral neurologist
- Sumi Helal, computer scientist
- Larry L. Hench, emeritus professor of ceramic engineering
- Seymour Hess, meteorologist and planetary scientist
- Kuo-chu Ho, nuclear physicist
- Horton H. Hobbs Jr., carcinologist
- David A. Hodell, geologist
- Michael Hofmann, German poet
- Norman N. Holland, former literary critic and Marston-Milbauer Eminent Scholar Emeritus at the University of Florida
- Noy Holland, writer
- C. S. Holling, Canadian ecologist and winner of the Volvo Environment Prize
- Marjorie Hoy, entomologist and geneticist
- Aparna V. Huzurbazar, statistician

I

- Lonnie Ingram, microbiologist and Fellow of the American Academy of Microbiology and Society of Industrial Microbiology
- Brian Iwata, psychologist

J

- Christopher Jermaine, computer scientist
- Julie A. Johnson, clinical pharmacist and translational scientist
- Suzanne Bennett Johnson, psychologist and a past president of the American Psychological Association
- Donald Justice, poet and Pulitzer Prize winner

K

- Lynda Lee Kaid, former Telecommunications and Research Foundation professor in the College of Journalism and Communications
- Rudolf E. Kálmán, Hungarian-born American electrical engineer, mathematician, and inventor
- Gladys Kammerer, political scientist
- Henry Kandrup, astrophysicist and professor at the University of Florida
- John Kaplan, photographer and Pulitzer Prize winner
- Herbert E. Kaufman, ophthalmologist
- Akito Y. Kawahara, American and Japanese entomologist, scientist, and advocate of nature education
- Robert Kennedy, chemist
- Ken Kerslake, archivist and Distinguished Service professor emeritus for the University of Florida
- Solon Kimball, anthropologist
- Elmer E. Kirkpatrick, former assistant professor in the College of Architecture at the University of Florida
- Harold Corby Kistler, biologist
- Karen Koch, plant biologist in the horticultural science department in the University of Florida
- Amie Kreppel, political scientist
- Marvin Krohn, criminologist
- G. Pradeep Kumar, cell biologist

L

- Elizabeth Lada, professor of Astronomy at the University of Florida
- Joseph Ladapo, professor of Medicine and Surgeon General of Florida
- Jane Landers, historian
- Louis J. Lanzerotti, professor of Physics
- Jean A. Larson, mathematician; professor at the University of Florida
- Robert Lawless, cultural anthropologist
- David Leavitt, novelist and professor of English
- Ji-Hyun Lee, statistician
- René Lemarchand, French political scientist
- Dov Levine, American-Israeli physicist
- Tracy R. Lewis, professor of economics
- Jian Li, electrical engineer
- William Link, historian
- Bernard J. Liska, food scientist
- William Logan, poet, critic, and scholar
- Bette A. Loiselle, professor in the Department of Wildlife Ecology and Conservation
- Frank LoMonte, lawyer and journalist
- Ira Longini, biostatistician and infectious disease epidemiologist
- Prakash Loungani, macroeconomist
- Per-Olov Löwdin, Swedish physicist
- Andrew Nelson Lytle, professor of Literature; helped start the Masters of Fine Arts program at UF

M

- Neill W. Macaulay Jr., writer and professor
- Murdo J. MacLeod, Scottish historian of Latin America
- G. S. Maddala, Indian-American economist and mathematician
- John K. Mahon, historian
- William R. Maples, forensic anthropologist; worked with the Florida Museum of Natural History
- Maxine Margolis, anthropologist; American Academy of Arts and Sciences inductee
- A. H. de Oliveira Marques, Portuguese historian
- Anita Marshall, geoscience education researcher and disability activist
- Maia Martcheva, mathematical biologist
- Ellen E. Martin, paleoceanographer
- Fletcher Martin, painter
- William Clifford Massey, anthropologist
- Marianne Mathewson-Chapman, professor of nursing and retired major general with the Army National Guard
- D. R. Matthews, political scientist and former member of the U.S. House of Representatives
- Janet Snyder Matthews, historian and author
- Walter Mauderli, Swiss professor of medical physics
- Lisa McElwee-White, Colonel Allen R. and Margaret G. Crow Professor of Chemistry at the University of Florida
- Irma McClaurin, poet and anthropologist
- Michael P. McDonald, political scientist
- Robert McMahon, international relations expert
- William McRae, lawyer and judge for the United States District Court for the Middle District of Florida
- Kenneth Megill, philosopher, trade unionist, social activist, records and knowledge manager
- Jawahar L. Mehta, former professor of Medicine
- Arnold Mesches, visual artist
- Amando de Miguel, Spanish sociologist
- Prabhat Mishra, computer-scientist
- Duane Mitchell, physician-scientist and university professor
- Kathryn Kimball Mizelle, legal scholar and current judge with the United States District Court for the Middle District of Florida
- Rose Mooney-Slater, X-ray crystallography
- John H. Moore, anthropologist and former chair of the Anthropology Department
- Thomas Hill Moore, former commissioner of the U.S. Consumer Product Safety Commission
- Jacques Morcos, neurologist and fellow with the University of Florida
- Christopher Mores, arbovirologist
- Leonid Moroz, neuroscientist
- Charles W. Morris, semiotician and philosopher
- Charles Gould Morton, professor of Military Science and Major General with the United States Army
- Michael Moseley, anthropologist
- William Murrill, mycologist

N

- Stephen Nadeau, behavioral neurologist, researcher and academician
- P. K. Ramachandran Nair, agricultural scientist
- Vasudha Narayanan, scholar of Hinduism at University of Florida and former president of the American Academy of Religion
- DeLill Nasser, geneticist
- Charles Nelson, legal scholar and former U.S. representative from Maine
- Wilmon Newell, entomologist
- Wayne L. Nicholson, microbiologist and scientist
- Lucy Nulton, educator and folklorist

O

- Thomas Oakland, educational psychologist
- Howard T. Odum, ecologist
- Michael S. Okun, neurologist, neuroscientist and author
- James Oliverio, composer of film scores and contemporary classical music
- Neil D. Opdyke, distinguished professor emeritus in the Department of Geological Sciences at the University of Florida
- Ants Oras, Estonian translator and writer
- Paul Ortiz, historian
- George C. Osborn, historian and author
- Harry Ostrer, geneticist

P

- Lawrence M. Page, ichthyologist
- John Anderson Palmer, philosopher and professor of philosophy at the University of Florida and awarded a Guggenheim Fellowship
- Cheryl Palm, professor of Agricultural and Biological Engineering
- Alfred Browning Parker, Modernist architect
- Karen F. Parker, sociologist and criminologist known for her research on urban violence
- Woodrow McClain Parker, educator, mental health counselor, and author
- Rembert W. Patrick, historian, longtime University of Florida history professor, and author
- Simon Penny, professor in the field of interactive art
- Michael Perfit, geologist
- Anna L. Peterson, scholar of religious studies
- Nicole Leeper Piquero, criminologist
- S. Jay Plager, professor with the Levin College of Law and judge with the United States Court of Appeals for the Federal Circuit
- Philip Podsakoff, professor of management
- Ernest C. Pollard, professor of physics and biophysics and an author
- Frank Moya Pons, leading contemporary historian on the Dominican Republic
- Ana Maria Porras, biomedical engineering
- Padgett Powell, novelist
- Donald D. Price, neuroscientist and psychologist
- Jose Principe, bioengineer
- Juliet Pulliam, epidemiologist
- Stuart R. Purser, painter, writer, and academic
- Frank W. Putnam, biologist and author

R

- Michael L. Radelet, sociologist
- Anil K. Rajvanshi, Indian engineer
- Subramaniam Ramakrishnan, Indian polymer chemist
- Marjorie Kinnan Rawlings, writer, Pulitzer Prize winner for the novel The Yearling
- Rachel Rebouché, legal scholar
- George Alan Rekers, psychologist and ordained Southern Baptist minister
- David Reitze, professor of physics
- Albert Rhoton Jr., professor of Surgery
- Albert Ritzhaupt, professor of educational technology and computer science
- David Roberts, assistant clinical professor of emergency medicine
- R. Michael Roberts, biologist
- Mary Robison, short-story writer and novelist
- Carlos Rojas, sinologist and translator
- Subrata Roy, inventor, educator, and scientist
- Yuli Rudyak, professor of mathematics
- Katheryn Russell-Brown, legal scholar
- Darrett B. Rutman, historian
- Mimi Ryan, education instructor

S

- Kevin Sabet, assistant professor in the Department of Psychiatry at the University of Florida
- Helen Safa, anthropologist, feminist scholar and academic
- Mohammad Saleem, particle physicist
- David Sappington, economist, academic advisor, and author
- Chih-Tang Sah, professor of Physics, and professor of Electrical and Computer Engineering
- Andrew P. Sage, systems engineer
- Michelle Samuel-Foo, biologist
- Norman Sartorius, psychiatrist
- Robert Satcher, physician, chemical engineer, NASA astronaut, and fellow with the University of Florida College of Medicine
- Paul Satz, psychologist, and one of the founders of the discipline neuropsychology
- Lawrence Scarpa, architect, educator, leader in sustainable design
- John Schrieffer, physicist, Nobel Prize winner
- Christine E. Schmidt, biomedical engineer
- Samuel Sears, psychologist
- Zachary Selden, former deputy secretary-general of the NATO Parliamentary Assembly; associate professor of international relations
- Leland Shanor, mycologist and botanist
- Wei Shyy, professor of Aerospace Engineering
- David Silkenat, professor of Southern history
- Gwendolyn Zoharah Simmons, religious scholar
- Robert Singerman, Judaica bibliographer; held the position of University Librarian at the George A. Smathers Libraries where he was the bibliographer for Jewish Studies, Anthropology, and Linguistics
- Susan Sinnott, material scientist
- John C. Slater, physicist; made major contributions to the theory of the electronic structure of atoms, molecules and solids
- Laura Sjoberg, international affairs scholar
- Benjamin Smith, political scientist
- Patricia Snyder, sociologist
- Ottón Solís, scholar of Latin American studies
- Richard E. Spear, art historian
- Colette St. Mary, professor and associate chair of the biology department
- Alexander Stephan, specialist in German literature and area studies
- Bill Stern, botanist and professor
- Evon Streetman, faculty with the Samuel P. Harn Museum of Art

T

- Elizabeth J. Tasker, British astrophysicist and science writer
- Bron Taylor, scholar and conservationist
- Erika Moore Taylor, biomedical engineer and scientist
- Mark Tehranipoor, researcher specializing in hardware security
- My T. Thai, computer science engineer and professor in the Computer and Information Science and Engineering department
- Henri Theil, Dutch econometrician
- Michael C. Thomas, entomologist and writer; works for the Florida Department of Agriculture and Consumer Services as a Taxonomic Entomologist, Entomology Section Administrator, and curator of Coleoptera and Orthoptera
- Cynthia K. Thompson, neurolinguist and cognitive neuroscientist
- John G. Thompson, mathematician, Abel Prize and Fields Medal winner
- Charles Thorn, professor of Physics
- Jalie Tucker, professor of Clinical Psychology
- James B. Twitchell, author and former professor of English

U

- Jerry Uelsmann, photographer
- Stanislaw Ulam, Polish mathematician
- Gregory Ulmer, professor of English at the University of Florida

V

- James Van Fleet, commander for the University of Florida ROTC Program, commanding general of U.S. Army and other United Nations forces during the Korean War
- Carl Van Ness, University of Florida historian and archivist
- Gonda Van Steen, Cassas Chair in Greek Studies
- Adam S. Veige, professor of Chemistry
- Johannes Vieweg, professor of Urology, Eminent Scholar Chair, College of Medicine
- Harald von Boehmer, German immunologist

W

- Sidney Wade, poet
- Alexander Wagenaar, professor of health outcomes and policy at the University of Florida College of Medicine
- Chanequa Walker-Barnes, theologian and psychologist
- Alexander Doniphan Wallace, professor of mathematics
- Michael Warren, forensic anthropologist
- Count Albert Wass, Hungarian Professor of Literature and History
- James L. Wattenbarger, professor of Education, and Father of the Community College System of Florida
- Robert Wears, medical doctor, professor of emergency medicine, and safety researcher
- Rudolph Weaver, first professor of architecture, first dean of architecture, second architect for Florida Board of Control
- Wilse B. Webb, psychologist and sleep researcher
- Phillip E. Wegner, Marston-Milbauer Eminent Scholar in English at the University of Florida
- Tan Weihong, chemist
- John Daniel Wild, philosopher
- Diana J. Wilkie, nurse researcher
- Dudley Williams, physicist and former president of the Optical Society of America
- Hiram D. Williams, painter and professor of art at the University of Florida
- Joy Williams, author
- Lakiesha Williams, associate professor in Biomedical Engineering
- Reva Williams, theoretical astrophysicist
- Robert E. Wilson, astrophysicist, academic, and author
- Elizabeth S. Wing, zooarchaeologist and curator emerita at the Florida Museum of Natural History
- Kate Vixon Wofford, educator and elected official
- Frank Bradshaw Wood, astronomer
- William Woodruff, British historian of world history
- Donald E. Worcester, historian, specialized in Southwestern United States and Latin American history
- Monique Worrell, former judge with Ninth Judicial Circuit Court of Florida
- Dapeng Wu, electrical engineer
- Bertram Wyatt-Brown, historian of the Southern United States
- Clive Wynne, British-Australian ethologist

Y

- Janet K. Yamamoto, immunologist
- Kane S. Yee, Chinese-American electrical engineer and mathematician
- Richard Yost, scientist
- Linda J. Young, chief Mathematical Statistician at the National Agricultural Statistics Service

Z

- Miriam Zach, musicologist
- Michael Zerner, physicist
- Robert Zieger, labor historian

== See also ==
- List of University of Florida alumni
- List of University of Florida presidents
