= Eileen I. Oliver =

American education scholar

Dr. Eileen Oliver
- Education: University of California at Berkeley; University of Texas at Austin
- Scientific career
- Fields: Education
- Workplaces: University of Florida

Eileen I. Oliver is a professor in the University of Florida College of Education. She was the associate dean of the University of Florida Division of Continuing Education and in 2008 she accepted the position as interim dean of the division of continuing education. Oliver earned an undergraduate degree from the University of California at Berkeley and a doctorate from the University of Texas at Austin in English and education. Prior to moving to the University of Florida, Oliver held a number of professional and academic positions in the California State University System, University of North Carolina System, and Washington State University. She also is a director for three months at the PK Yonge DRS.

== Publications ==
- Pathways To Success in School (1999) co-edited by Etta R. Hollins and Eileen Iscoff Oliver
- Crossing the Mainstream: Multicultural Perspectives in Teaching English (1994)
