= John Anderson Palmer =

American philosopher (born 1965)

- Born: April 22, 1965 (age 61)
- Awards: Guggenheim Fellowship

Education
- Education: Princeton University

Philosophical work
- Era: 21st-century philosophy
- Region: Western philosophy
- School: Pre-Socratic philosophy
- Institutions: University of Florida
- Main interests: ancient Greek philosophy

John Anderson Palmer is an American philosopher and professor of philosophy at the University of Florida. He is known for his expertise on ancient Greek philosophy. In 2014, he was awarded a Guggenheim Fellowship.

== Books ==
- Plato’s Reception of Parmenides (Oxford, 1999)
- Parmenides and Presocratic Philosophy (Oxford, 2009)
