= Phil Lounibos =

American entomologist

L. Philip Lounibos is an American entomologist.

Lounibos focuses on the biology of mosquitos, malaria, dengue, vector-borne disease, medical entomology and biological control, and invasion biology. He is currently Distinguished Professor at University of Florida.
