= Colette St. Mary =

American evolutionary biologist

Colette Marie St. Mary is a professor and associate chair of the biology department at the University of Florida. Her research focuses include behavioral and evolutionary ecology, speciation, sexual selection, and evolutionary aspects of cancer. Working mainly with fish model organisms, St. Mary is also interested in marine fisheries management and reproduction and evolution in hatchery settings. St. Mary received her Bachelor's degree in Biology from Harvard Radcliffe College before earning her Ph.D from University of California, Santa Barbara in 1994. She is the first African-American woman to ever receive a Ph.D. in evolutionary biology in the United States. Her thesis was on the determinant of sex allocation patterns and maintenance of simultaneous hermaphroditism in the blue banded goby and zebra goby.

== Research focuses ==
=== The evolution of parental care ===
St. Mary's research into the evolution of parental care has caused a shift in the conceptual understanding of the evolution of prenatal care (in fishes). The previous theory proposed by evolutionary biologists is parental care comes at a tradeoff - by engaging in parental care for current offspring, males are decreasing the time and energy available for future mating events or survivorship. Thus it would be expected that not males who do not provide parental care would have increased lifetime reproductive success by fertilizing eggs from more females. This would suggest that males should invest in courtship rather than parental care; however this is not what is observed. Together with colleagues, St. Mary showed that in species with male-only parental care, females evaluate males based on their level of parental care, and that males show increased care in the presence of potential mates, suggesting that male parental care is subject to sexual selection as a result of female choice. More recently, studies of bi-parental care species like certain cichlid fish validated these data and showed that some parental care behaviors function to increase both survival of offspring and mating success.

=== Evolution, behavior, and conservation ===
St. Mary has also collaborated on the study of the effect of agriculture (and agricultural contaminants) on gonadal form and function in the giant cane toad Bufo marinus (also known as Rhinella marina), which found that toads living on land used for agriculture had increased incidences of gonadal abnormalities and intersex gonads. Males were feminized or demasculinized with altered testosterone levels corresponding to the level of agricultural land use. She also helped publish another study of the giant toad species which demonstrated reduced spermatogenesis in toads living in agricultural areas due to endocrine disrupting chemicals. Other studies authored in this field include the ecological determinants of settlement choice in coral reef fish larvae, and the effects of hatchery rearing of Florida largemouth bass.

=== Autotomy ===
St. Mary has also contributed significantly to the field of autotomy. Though a behavior that has evolved repeatedly - seen in crabs, lizards, crickets, and more, the evolutionary pressure behind limb loss is not well understood. The loss of a limb exposes an organism to significant costs - loss of blood or body fluid, risk of infection, and the loss of that limb function, which could affect reproductive success. However, she and her colleagues have demonstrated that in some cases self-autotomy can reduce the cost of injury or allow the organism to escape predation, confirming two popular theories behind the practice. While autotomy for escaping predators is relatively widely accepted, limb loss as a method to reduce the survival cost injury is a novel feature first demonstrated by Dr. St. Mary et al. By autotomizing at a preformed breakage plane the organism can reduce the survival cost of the injury.
