= Mary Ann Eaverly =

Academic background
- Education: Bryn Mawr College, University of Michigan

Academic work
- Discipline: Classics; Archaeology
- Institutions: University of Florida
- Website: classics.ufl.edu/people/faculty/eaverly/

Mary Ann Eaverly is Professor of Classics at the University of Florida known for her work on Archaic Greek sculpture.

== Career ==
Eaverly studied Classical and Near Eastern Archaeology at Bryn Mawr College and the University of Michigan, where she was awarded her PhD in 1986 for a thesis titled 'The Equestrian Statue in Archaic Greek Sculpture.' She spent the period 1982–84 at the American School of Classical Studies at Athens, where she was Vanderpool Fellow in 1984. Subsequently, she joined the University of Florida in 1986, where she has been professor and chair of the department of Classics since 2015.

In 2016 Eaverly received the Greenia Fellowship for her project Parthenon, Pilgrimage, and Panathenaia: A Re-examination of Archaic Greek Votive Statues. Eaverly's scholarship has focused on iconography in Greek and Egyptian art, especially Archaic Greek sculpture. Her first book, based on her dissertation, was published in 1995, and her subsequent research has included colour and gender in Greek and Egyptian art, the subject of her second book, 'Tan Men, Pale Women: Color and Gender in Ancient Greece and Egypt', published in 2013. In 2016 she received the Greenia Fellowship for her project Parthenon, Pilgrimage, and Panathenaia: A Re-examination of Archaic Greek Votive Statues.

Eaverly has also published on archaeological imagery in modernist poets, collaborating with Marsha Bryant at the University of Florida. Together, Bryant and Eaverly curated the exhibition 'Classical Convergences: Traditions & Inventions' at the Samuel P. Harn Museum of Art in 2014–15.

== Select publications ==
- with Bryant, M. (2019) 'Modernist Migrations: Myths, Museums, Pedagogy', in eds. Kozak and Hickman, The Classics in Modernist Translation, Bloomsbury, 189-200 ISBN 9781350040953
- (2013)Tan Men, Pale Women: Color and Gender in Ancient Greece and Egypt. University of Michigan Press: Ann Arbor ISBN 9780472119110
- with Bryant, M. (2007). 'Egypto-Modernism: James Henry Breasted, HD, and the New Past.' Modernism/modernity, 14(3), 435–453.
- with Bryant, M. (2004) 'Classical Tourism in Debora Greger's Poetry.' Mosaic (Winnipeg), 37(3), 67–91.
- (1999) 'Color and Gender in Ancient Painting: A Pan-Mediterranean Approach', in eds. Wicker and Arnold, From the Ground Up: Beyond Gender Theory in Archaeology. Archaeopress: Oxford, 5–10. ISBN 9781841710259
- (1995) Archaic Greek Equestrian Sculpture. University of Michigan Press: Ann Arbor ISBN 9780472103515
