= Thomas Lyle Martin Jr. =

American university president (1921–2009)

Thomas Lyle Martin Jr. (September 26, 1921 – October 8, 2009) served as president of the Illinois Institute of Technology (ITT) from 1974 to 1987.

== Biography ==
Martin was born on September 26, 1921, in Memphis, Tennessee. During the Second World War, he served in the US Army, rising to the rank of captain.

He received a bachelor's degree in electrical engineering from Rensselaer Polytechnic Institute in 1942 and a master's in 1948. He went on to obtain a PhD degree in electrical engineering from Stanford University. Prior to joining the Illinois Institute of Technology (IIT) administration, he served as dean of Engineering at the University of Arizona, the University of Florida and Southern Methodist University. He was a fellow of IEEE and a member of the U.S. National Academy of Engineering. He served as president of IIT from 1974 to 1987.

Martin died in Irving, Texas, on October 8, 2009.

Academic offices
Preceded by Maynard P. Venema	President of the Illinois Institute of Technology; 1974–1987	Succeeded by Meyer Feldberg
