= Leslie Thiele =

Leslie Paul Thiele is an American political scientist. He is a distinguished professor at the University of Florida. His work has focused on the intersection of politics and sustainability. In addition to his academic work, he serves as the director for the Center for Adaptive Resilience, Ethics and Science at the University of Florida.
