= Kole Ade-Odutola =

Nigerian Yoruba poet

- Education: University of Benin (BS); University of Reading (MA); Ithaca College (MS); Rutgers University (PhD)
- Occupations: Poet, Photographer, Academic
- Writing career
- Language: English, Yoruba
- Notable works: The Poet Bled; The Poet Fled

Kole Ade-Odutola is a Nigerian Yoruba poet, photographer, and academic. He has published several books of poetry, including The Poet Bled and The Poet Fled. He was critical in the founding of the Coalition of Nigerian Artists (CONA), that advocates the Nigerian government for better visibility of the arts. He has participated in various events pushing for greater rights and access to the arts and free speech in Nigeria.

Odutola received his Bachelor of Science in Botany in 1984 from the University of Benin, and in 1998, his Master's Degree in TV/Video from the University of Reading. He undertook Master's level studies in Organizational Communication, Learning & Design (OCLD) at Ithaca College, which he completed in 2000. He later enrolled in the Rutgers University School of Communication, Information and Library Science, receiving his Doctorate of Philosophy in Media Studies in 2010. He has worked as a lecturer at Rutgers University and now teaches language and cultures at the University of Florida, which he has done since 2006.

Odutola has made various speeches, lectures, and presentations regarding Nollywood, literature, and poetry and mass media in Nigeria at various national and international conferences and events.
