= Adam S. Veige =

Chemistry professor

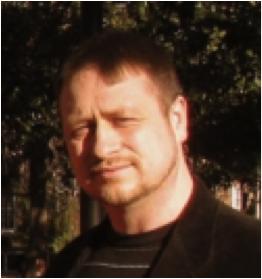
- Education: Cornell University; Massachusetts Institute of Technology
- Known for: Trianionic pincer ligands Coordinatively and electronically unsaturated early transition metal complexes
- Scientific career
- Fields: Inorganic and Organometallic Chemistry
- Workplaces: University of Florida
- Doctoral advisor: Peter T. Wolczanski

Adam S. Veige is a professor of Chemistry at the University of Florida. His research focuses on catalysis and the usage of inorganic compounds, including tungsten and chromium complexes.

== Education ==
Veige received a Ph.D. degree in chemistry from Cornell University in 2003 under the direction of Peter T. Wolczanski. He pursued postdoctoral research under the direction of Daniel G. Nocera at Massachusetts Institute of Technology.

== Career ==
Veige joined the faculty of the University of Florida as an assistant professor of chemistry (inorganic chemistry) in 2004. In 2010, Veige received the Alfred P. Sloan fellowship award, the only researcher to be so honored in Florida in 2010. He was promoted to an associate professor in 2011. He is currently the director of the Center for Catalysis in the Department of Chemistry at the University of Florida.

His research focuses on the design, synthesis, isolation, and characterization of novel inorganic molecules for application in the production of fertilizers, polymers, and pharmaceuticals. His research has included the preparation of chiral catalysts, synthesis of nitriles via N-atom transfer to acid chlorides, chromium catalyzed aerobic oxidation, an alkene isomerization catalyst, a highly active alkene polymerization catalyst, and a highly active alkyne polymerization catalyst.

== Awards ==
- Camille and Henry Dreyfus New Faculty Award (2004)
- National Science Foundation (NSF) Career Award (2008)
- Alfred P. Sloan Fellowship Award (2010)
- Heaton Family Faculty Award (2011)

== Selected publications ==
- McGowan, K. P.; O'Reilly, M. E.; Ghiviriga, I.; Abboud, K. A.; Veige, A. S. (2013). "Compelling mechanistic data and identification of the active species in tungsten-catalyzed alkyne polymerizations: Conversion of a trianionic pincer into a new tetraanionic pincer-type ligand". Chemical Science. 4 (3): 1145. doi:10.1039/C2SC21750C.
- Sarkar, S.; McGowan, K. P.; Kuppuswamy, S.; Ghiviriga, I.; Abboud, K. A.; Veige, A. S. (2012). "An OCO3–Trianionic Pincer Tungsten(VI) Alkylidyne: Rational Design of a Highly Active Alkyne Polymerization Catalyst". Journal of the American Chemical Society. 134 (10): 4509–4512. Bibcode:2012JAChS.134.4509S. doi:10.1021/ja2117975. PMID 22352966.
- O'Reilly, M. E.; Del Castillo, T. J.; Abboud, K. A.; Veige, A. S. (2012). "The influence of reversible trianionic pincer OCO3−μ-oxo Criv dimer formation (\Criv]2(μ-O)) and donor ligands in oxygen-atom-transfer (OAT)". Dalton Transactions. 41 (8): 2237–2246. doi:10.1039/c1dt11104c. PMID 22094964.
- McGowan, K. P.; Abboud, K. A.; Veige, A. S. (2011). "Trianionic NCN^{3−} Pincer Complexes of Chromium in Four Oxidation States (Cr^{II}, Cr^{III}, Cr^{IV}, Cr^{V}): Determination of the Active Catalyst in Selective 1-Alkene to 2-Alkene Isomerization". Organometallics. 30 (18): 4949–4957. doi:10.1021/om200547u.
- O’Reilly, M. E.; Del Castillo, T. J.; Falkowski, J. M.; Ramachandran, V.; Pati, M.; Correia, M. C.; Abboud, K. A.; Dalal, N. S.; Richardson, D. E.; Veige, A. S. (2011). "Autocatalytic O_{2} Cleavage by an OCO^{3−} Trianionic Pincer Cr^{III} Complex: Isolation and Characterization of the Autocatalytic Intermediate [Cr^{IV}]_{2}(μ-O) Dimer". Journal of the American Chemical Society. 133 (34): 13661–13673. Bibcode:2011JAChS.13313661O. doi:10.1021/ja2050474. PMID 21780813.
- Del Castillo, T. J.; Sarkar, S.; Abboud, K. A.; Veige, A. S. (2011). "1,3-Dipolar cycloaddition between a metal–azide (Ph_{3}PAuN_{3}) and a metal–acetylide (Ph_{3}PAuC≡CPh): An inorganic version of a click reaction". Dalton Transactions. 40 (32): 8140–8144. doi:10.1039/C1DT10787A. PMID 21725564.
