= Dapeng Wu =

Electrical engineer

Dapeng Wu is an electrical engineer at the University of Florida in Gainesville. He was named a Fellow of the Institute of Electrical and Electronics Engineers (IEEE) in 2013 for his contributions to video communications, processing, and wireless networking.
