= Sumi Helal =

Egyptian-born computer scientist

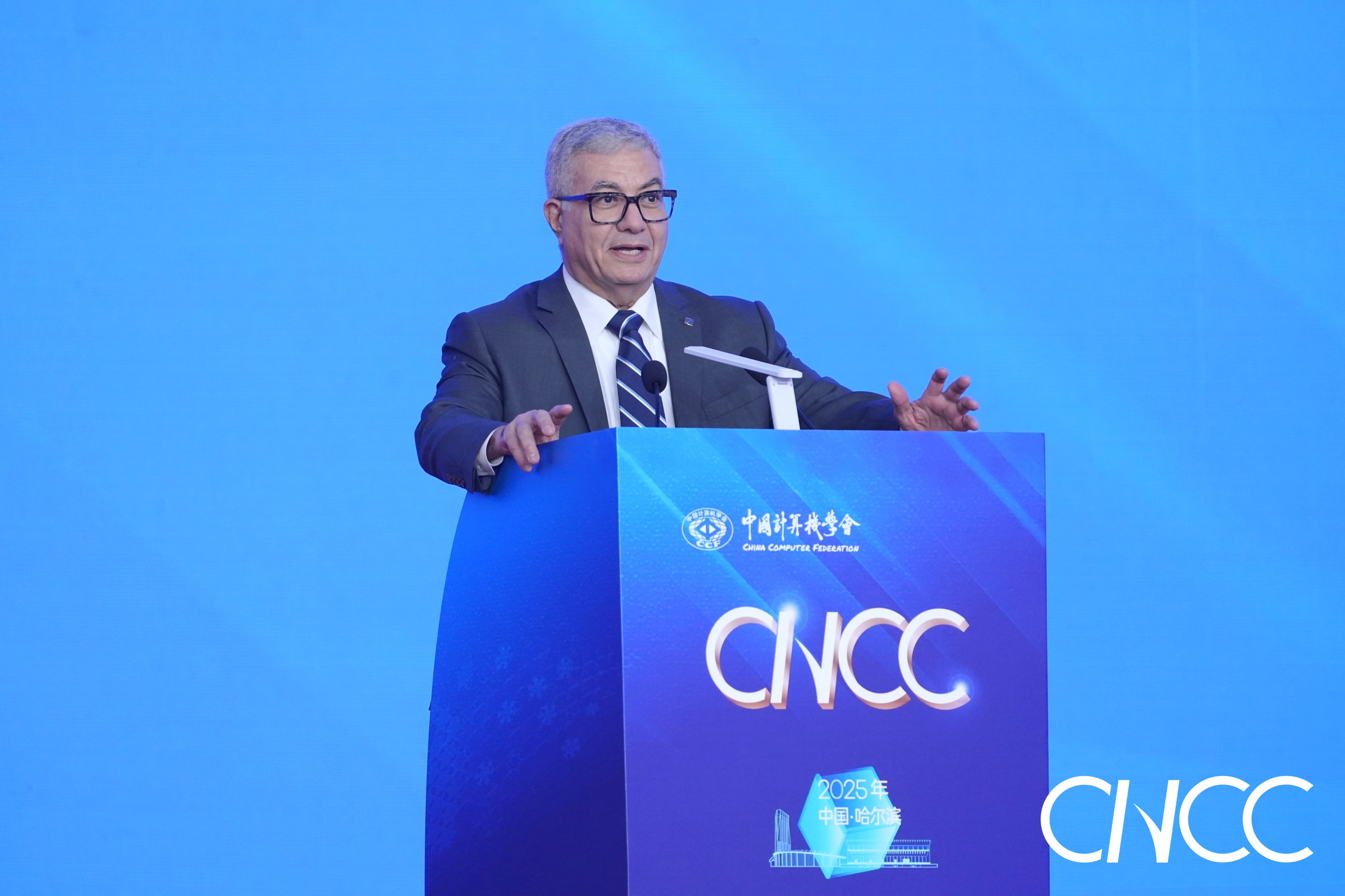
- Born: Suez, Egypt
- Scientific career
- Fields: Computer Science
- Workplaces: University of Florida
- Website: http://sumihelal.com

Abdelsalam Ali Helal (also known as Sumi Helal) is an Egyptian-born computer scientist specializing in pervasive computing, mobile computing, the Internet of Things (IoT), and digital health. He is a Full Professor in the Department of Computer Science and Engineering at the University of Bologna. He spent over 26 years at the Department of Computer and Information Science and Engineering at the University of Florida, where he served as a professor. He is a Fellow of the ACM, IEEE, and AAAS, and is also a member of the Academia Europaea and the National Academy of Inventors.

Helal currently serves as the editor-in-chief of IEEE Computer. He was an associate editor in chief and an editorial board member of the IEEE Pervasive Computing magazine. He has been listed among the top 2% of most-cited scientists in the world (Scopus, 2023-2025).

== Early life and education ==
Helal was born in Suez, Egypt. He earned a Bachelor of Engineering in Computer Engineering and Automatic Control (summa cum laude) from Alexandria University in 1982, followed by a Master of Engineering from the same institution in 1985. He then moved to the United States, where he spent one year at Penn State University as a researcher in the SDI Program before moving on to Purdue University, in West Lafayette, Indiana, where he received an M.Sc. and a Ph.D. in Computer Sciences in 1989 and 1991, respectively.

== Career ==
Helal began his academic career as an assistant professor at the University of Texas at Arlington from 1991 to 1994. He then worked as a Visiting Assistant Professor at his Alma mater – Purdue University for one year before joining Microelectronics and Computer Corporation (MCC) in Austin, Texas, as a Member of the Technical Staff from 1996 to 1998.

In 1998, he joined the University of Florida (UF) as an associate professor in the Department of Computer and Information Science and Engineering (CISE). He was promoted to full professor in 2004 and remained at UF for 26 years until 2024, where he became an emeritus professor. At UF, he directed the Mobile and Pervasive Computing Laboratory and co-founded the Gator Tech Smart House, a real-world living laboratory designed to research and develop smart home technologies as assistive and supportive environments for older adults and people with special needs.

Between 2017 and 2020, while on leave from UF, Helal served as a Professor and Chair in Digital Health at Lancaster University in the United Kingdom. In this role, he was jointly appointed in the School of Computing and Communications and the Division of Health Research.

In 2024, he joined the University of Bologna in Italy as a full professor under the Italian government's "Brain Gain" program.

== Research and entrepreneurship ==
Helal's research centers on the architecture and programmability of the Internet of Things, edge intelligence, and the intelligent orchestration of computation across the computing continuum. It also addresses pervasive computing systems, particularly their applications in digital health, aging, and disability. He is recognized for his contributions to service-oriented device architectures (SODA) and its commercialization (the Atlas IoT Platform), and for pioneering the concept of the "Smart Home in a Box" and its demonstration within the Gator Tech Smart House.

== Awards and honors ==
- 2026: Fellow of the National Academy of Inventors
- 2023: ACM Fellow
- 2022: AAIA Fellow (Asia-Pacific Artificial Intelligence Association)
- 2020: Member of Academia Europaea
- 2019: AAAS Fellow
- 2019: IET Fellow
- 2015: IEEE Fellow

== Projects ==
Helal has founded Phoneomena Inc., Pervasa Inc., Spaceify Oy, Rokiot USA, and Mobility Workx. Patents resulting from his research have been licensed to major multinational corporations, including Google, Apple, Samsung, Bosch, Siemens, Verizon, T-Mobile, ATT, Comcast, Intertek, Nokia, Ericsson, IKEA, and Amazon.

== Selected publications ==
- Helal, A., Mann, W., Zabadani, H., King, J., Kaddoura, Y., and Jansen, E. (2005). “The Gator Tech Smart House: A Programmable Pervasive Space.” IEEE Computer, 38(3), 64–74. https://doi.org/10.1109/MC.2005.93
- Helal, A., Chen, C., Bose, R., Kim, E., and Lee, C. (2012). “Towards an Ecosystem for Developing and Programming Assistive Environments.” Proceedings of the IEEE, 100(8), 2489–2504. https://doi.org/10.1109/JPROC.2012.2200554
- Xu, Y., and Helal, A. (2016). “Scalable Cloud-Sensor Architecture for the Internet of Things.” IEEE Internet of Things Journal, 3, 285–298. https://doi.org/10.1109/JIOT.2015.2492463
- Khaled, A., and Helal, A. (2018). “IoT-DDL—Device Description Language for the ‘T’ in IoT.” IEEE Access, 6, 24048–24063. https://doi.org/10.1109/ACCESS.2018.2825295
- Chen, C., Helal, A., Jin, Z., Zhang, M., and Lee, C. (2022). “IoTranx: Transactions for Safer Smart Spaces.” ACM Transactions on Cyber-Physical Systems, 6(1). https://doi.org/10.1145/3471937

== Selected patents ==
- Helal, A. et al. (2011). U.S. Patent 7,895,257
- Helal, A. et al. (2013). U.S. Patent 8,631,063
- Helal, A. et al. (2007). U.S. Patent 7,231,330
- Helal, A. et al. (2012). U.S. Patent 8,213,417
