= Raghavan Charudattan =

American academic (born 1942)

- Born: 1942 (age 83–84); Tanjavur, India
- Education: University of Madras (Ph.D.)
- Occupation: Academic
- Years active: 1970–present
- Employer: University of Florida
- Known for: Founding the journal Biological Control
- Title: Professor Emeritus
- Awards: USDA Superior Service Award; Fellow of the Weed Science Society of America

Raghavan Charudattan (born 1942) is an American academic.

== Biography ==
Charudattan was born in 1942, in Tanjavur, India. He holds a BSc and an MSc degree from the University of Madras, where he studied botany and chemistry; he also earned a PhD in plant pathology and mycology. Following his post-doctoral research at the University of California-Davis, Charudattan joined the University of Florida in 1970 and was appointed as a full professor in 1983. He now serves as professor emeritus at the University of Florida.

Charudattan founded the journal Biological Control and served as its editor from 1991 to 2006.

== Awards and recognition ==
Charudattan has been recognized with awards such as the USDA Superior Service Award and has been named a fellow of the Weed Science Society of America.
