= Zachary Selden =

American educator, author, and diplomat

Deputy Secretary General for Policy of the NATO Parliamentary Assembly
- In office 2008–2011

Personal details
- Education: University of California Los Angeles (PhD)

Zachary Selden is an American educator, author, and diplomat who served as the Deputy Secretary General for Policy at the NATO Parliamentary Assembly from 2008 to 2011. Selden is now an associate professor at the University of Florida.

Selden has also worked as an analyst in the Congressional Budget Office and as the Director of Defense and Security Committee of the NATO Parliamentary Assembly.

Selden is an author on American national security, European affairs, and NATO. Selden has been a researcher and commentator on NATO expansion during different parts of his career. Selden has commented or been interviewed in different outlets across the United States and Europe on NATO expansion since the 2022 Russian invasion of Ukraine.

== Works ==
=== Books ===
- Foreign Policy Failure in the White House: Reappraising the Fall of the Shah and the Iran-Contra Affair (1993), University Press of America, ISBN 9780819190765 (Co-Author)
- Economic Sanctions as Instruments of American Foreign Policy (1999), Praeger, ISBN 9780275963873 (Author)
- Alignment, Alliance, and American Grand Strategy (2016), University of Michigan Press, ISBN 9780472130009 (Author)

=== Other ===
- "Special Intelligence Service of the Federal Bureau of Investigation: Forgotten Forerunner of the Central Intelligence Agency", International Journal of Intelligence and CounterIntelligence, 36(4), 2023.
- "The General Intelligence Division: J. Edgar Hoover and the Critical Juncture of 1919", International Journal of Intelligence and CounterIntelligence, 34(2), 2021, pp. 342–357.
- "Taming the bear: American liquified natural gas (LNG) exports and the negation of Russian influence in Europe", Global Affairs, 6(2), 2020, pp. 149–165.
- "Economic interdependence and economic sanctions: a case study of European Union sanctions on Russia", Cambridge Review of International Affairs, 33(2), 2020, pp. 229–251. (with Paul M. Silva II)
- "Demography, defence budgets, and the transatlantic alliance", Journal of Transatlantic Studies, 16(1), 2018, pp. 59–80.
- "Balancing Against or Balancing With? The Spectrum of Alignment and the Endurance of American Hegemony", Security Studies, 22(2), 2013, pp. 330–364.
- NATO Burdensharing After Enlargement. Congressional Budget Office, August 2001. (with John J. Lis)
