= Fan Ren =

American chemical engineer

Fan Ren is an American chemical engineer, focusing in wide energy bandgap electronic services and semiconductor device passivation, currently Fred and Bonnie Edie Professor, distinguished professor and UF Term Professor at University of Florida.
