= Maia Martcheva =

Bulgarian American mathematician

Maia Nenkova Martcheva-Drashanska is a Bulgarian-American mathematical biologist known for her books on population dynamics and epidemiology. She is a professor of mathematics at the University of Florida, where she is also affiliated with the department of biology.

== Education and career ==
Martcheva earned a master's degree in mathematics from the University of Sofia in 1988. She completed her Ph.D. in applied mathematics in 1998 at Purdue University. Her dissertation, in population dynamics, was An Age-Structured Two-Sex Population Model, and was supervised by Fabio Augusto Milner.

After postdoctoral research at the University of Minnesota, she became an instructor at the Brooklyn Polytechnic Institute in 1999. After taking several additional visiting faculty positions, she moved to the University of Florida as an assistant professor in 2003.

== Books ==
Martcheva is the author of the book An Introduction to Mathematical Epidemiology (Texts in Applied Mathematics 61, Springer, 2016).

With Mimmo Ianelli and Fabio A. Milner, she is also the author of Gender-Structured Population Modeling: Mathematical Methods, Numerics, and Simulations (Frontiers in Applied Mathematics, 31, Society for Industrial and Applied Mathematics, 2005).
