= Onye P. Ozuzu =

Dean of the University of Florida College of the Arts

Onye P. Ozuzu is dean of the University of Florida College of the Arts. According to her website, she is a "dance administrator, performing artist, choreographer, educator, and researcher". Ozuzu has presented nationally and internationally.
