= Reza Abbaschian =

Iranian/American engineer

William R. Johnson, Jr. Professor Reza Abbaschian
- Occupation: Distinguished Professor
- Known for: Inducing $17 million in gifts for the institution

Academic work
- Discipline: Materials Science
- Sub-discipline: Metallurgy and Mining
- Institutions: University of California Riverside
- Website: Abbaschian Lab

Reza Abbaschian is an Iranian/American engineer, currently the William R. Johnson, Jr. Family Professor, Distinguished Professor of Mechanical Engineering and the former Dean of the Bourns College of Engineering and, also formerly the Vladimir Grodsky Professor of Materials Science at University of Florida. In 2006, he was elected to the American Association for the Advancement of Science, The Minerals, Metals and Materials Society and ASM, the latter of which he was a former president.

Abbaschian is considered pivotal in establishing a relationship with Winston Chung, which led to a $10 million donation to the college.

Abbascian was recognized with the 2017 AIME Honorary Membership Award for "pioneering contributions in solidification processing, materials education and leadership in materials science and engineering worldwide".

== Education ==
- Ph.D. in Materials Science and Engineering from the University of California, Berkeley
- M.S. in metallurgical engineering from Michigan Technological University
- BSc in mining and metallurgy from Tehran University
