= Leland D. Patouillet =

American academic

Dr. Leland Patouillet
- Born: New York City
- Education: University of Pittsburgh; University of Tennessee
- Known for: Being the former Director of the University of Florida Alumni Association
- Scientific career
- Fields: Alumni Relations
- Workplaces: Formerly University of Florida

Leland D. Patouillet is the former Director of the University of Florida Alumni Association.

Prior to his position at the University of Florida, he served as the associate vice chancellor for alumni relations and executive director of the University of Pittsburgh Alumni Association. Before that position he was the Director of Alumni Relations for the University of South Florida for six years.

Patouillet was born in New York City and moved to Clearwater at the age of 14, when his father got a job at the University of South Florida.

== Education ==
- Bachelor's degree in American Studies from the University of South Florida
- Master's degree in educational psychology from the University of Tennessee
- Doctorate in Administration and Policy Studies from the University of Pittsburgh

Preceded by Randy Talbot	University of Florida Director of Alumni Affairs; 2008 – 2009	Succeeded by Katie Marquis
