= Thomas E. Angelini =

American physicist

- Education: University of Nevada, Reno; University of Illinois Urbana-Champaign
- Occupation: Physicist

Thomas E. Angelini is an American physicist. He is a professor in the department of physics at the University of Florida.

In 2026, Angelini was named a fellow of the American Physical Society, "for pioneering advances in soft matter physics, including the development of embedded 3D bioprinting and discoveries in the mechanics of living materials that enable new insights into tissue organization, cell behavior, and soft material design".
