= Brij Moudgil =

Brij M. Moudgil is an American materials scientist and engineer, focusing in developing structure-property-performance correlations in particulate materials based nanoengineered systems for enhanced performance in bioimaging, diagnosis and therapies, micro-electronics, advanced materials, energy, and water purification applications. He is currently a distinguished professor at University of Florida.

In 2002, he was elected a member of the National Academy of Engineering for advances in mineral processing through innovations in selective polymer and surfactant coatings, and for professional leadership.
