= Roger Fillingim =

American psychologist and academic

Roger B. Fillingim is an American psychologist and distinguished professor at the University of Florida who won its Research Foundation Professorship.
