= Horace E. Stockbridge =

American agricultural chemist

Horace E. Stockbridge (May 19, 1857–October 30, 1930) was an American agricultural chemist who became the first president of North Dakota Agricultural College (now North Dakota State University).

== Early life and education ==
Stockbridge was born in Hadley, Massachusetts, and graduated from Massachusetts Agricultural College (now the University of Massachusetts Amherst) in 1878. After working for the USDA and as an instructor at the college, he went to graduate school at Boston University and then the University of Göttingen, where he completed his Ph.D. in 1884.

== Career ==
Upon completing graduate school, Stockbridge returned to the Massachusetts Agricultural College faculty but in 1885 moved to the Japanese Imperial College of Agriculture and Engineering.

Returning to the US, Stockbridge became president of North Dakota Agricultural College from 1890 to 1893. He later joined the faculty of the Florida Agricultural College.

== Legacy ==
At North Dakota State University, a residence hall was named after Stockbridge in 1957.
