= Prakash Loungani =

Indian macroeconomist

- Education: University of Bombay; University of Rochester
- Occupations: Macroeconomist, writer, professor
- Known for: Economics

Prakash Loungani is a macroeconomist known for his work on the difficulty of forecasting recessions. He proffers “inclusive growth” through research on understanding and lowering unemployment (“Okun’s Law: Fit at 50?”); documenting the impact of austerity on inequality (“Painful Medicine”); and uncovering the role of unfettered capital mobility across national borders in lowering labor’s share of income (“Opening Up to Inequity”). His early research focused on understanding the impacts of oil prices on the economy. He is an advisor and senior personnel manager in the International Monetary Fund's Independent Evaluation Office. He blogs as The Unassuming Economist.

== Career and education ==
Loungani earned his BA from the University of Bombay (now the University of Mumbai) and his MA and PhD in economics from the University of Rochester. Prior to joining the IMF in 1998, he was an analyst at the Federal Reserve Board's International Finance Division (covering Asian economies during the 1997-98 crisis), a senior economist at the Federal Reserve Bank of Chicago during 1990-92, and an assistant professor at the University of Florida during 1986-90. He was an adjunct professor of management at Vanderbilt University from 2001 to 2017. Since 2023, Loungani has served as Program Director and a senior lecturer for the Master of Science in Applied Economics program at Johns Hopkins University.

== Publications ==
Loungani has over 30 publications in the leading field journals in economics, which places him among the top 5% of economists based on citations and impact, according to IDEAS/RePEc. In addition to his technical work, he is known for his profiles of famous economists, including Robert Barro, Dani Rodrik, Jeff Sachs, Joseph Stiglitz and Stanley Fischer.

=== Selected works ===
- The distributional effects of capital account liberalization, IMF Working Paper 15/243, Journal of Development Economics, 2018, vol. 30, 127-44 (with D. Furceri).
- Okun’s law: fit at fifty? Journal of Money, Credit & Banking, 2017, vol. 49 (Oct.), 1413–41 (with L. Ball and D. Leigh).
- Regional labor market adjustments in the United States, Review of Economics & Statistics, 2017, vol. 99 (May), 243-57 (with M. Dao and D. Furceri).
- How accurate are private sector forecasts? Cross-country evidence from consensus forecasts of output growth, 2001, International Journal of Forecasting, Vol. 17, No. 3, pp. 419–32.
- The role of energy in real business cycle models, 1992, Journal of Monetary Economics, Vol. 29, No. 2, pp. 173–89 (with In-Moo Kim).
