= Richard L. Shriner =

American psychiatrist

Richard L. Shriner is the medical director of UF&Shands Vista Psychiatric Hospital in Gainesville, Florida. He is double boarded in both Internal Medicine and Psychiatry and has privileges in both psychiatry and internal medicine at the University of Florida. He has created many patient care programs along with physician care networks involving surgery, medicine, psychiatry, psychology, and nursing.

He has over 25 years of clinical experience as a medical psychiatrist. He has been the chairman of a department of psychiatry, has experience in education, and is the author of research articles and chapters in text books . He also heads the 'Living with Food' program at UF which helps people struggling with obesity who need help and who may even be addicted to food.

He writes a monthly article for the Gainesville Today Magazine.

== Education ==
- Medical Degree from Indiana University
- Psychiatry Residency at The Institute of Living at Hartford Hospital
- Internal Medicine Residency at the Institute of Living at Hartford Hospital
- Fellowship in Medical Psychiatry at Brown University
