= Jose Principe =

Jose C. Principe is an American Bioengineer, focusing in adaptive signal processing, kernel learning, information theoretic learning, neural networks, brain machine interfaces and cognitive architectures. In 2026, he retired from his position as Distinguished Professor of Electrical and Biomedical Engineering and BellSouth Professor at University of Florida.
