= William Ditto =

William L. Ditto (born 1959) is an American biomedical engineer.

Ditto was raised in Anchorage, Alaska. He studied physics at the University of California, Los Angeles and completed a doctorate in the subject at Clemson University. Ditto then worked for the United States Department of the Navy before teaching at the College of Wooster for two years. During his subsequent six-year tenure at Georgia Tech, Ditto was a founding member of the department of biomedical engineering, jointly established in 1999 by Georgia Tech and Emory University. Between 2002 and 2009, Ditto served as chair of the department of biomedical engineering at the University of Florida. He then joined the faculty of North Carolina State University.

In 2003, Ditto was elected a fellow of the American Physical Society, "[f]or achievements in experimental nonlinear dynamics, especially as applied to biological systems such as the heart and the brain."
