= Rajshree Agarwal =

Economist

- Education: University of Mumbai (MA); SUNY Buffalo (PhD)
- Occupation(s): Professor, researcher

Rajshree Agarwal is a professor of economics, the Rudolph Lamone Chair of Entrepreneurship and Strategy, and the Director of the Ed Snider Center for Enterprise and Markets at the University of Maryland. She "studies the evolution of industries, firms and individual careers, as fostered by the twin engines of innovation and enterprise."

== Education ==
Agarwal received her Masters of Arts in economics from the University of Mumbai in 1988 and her PhD in economics from SUNY Buffalo in 1994.

== Career ==
From 2001 to 2010, Agarwal was a professor of Strategic Management at the University of Illinois College of Business. She has also taught at the University of Florida.

== Influence and awards ==
Agarwal is the author or co-author of more than 150 articles in consumer-facing publications such as Forbes and Wired, and in academic journals such as The Journal of Law and Economics and the Academy of Management Journal. She is also the author of more than 60 studies which, cumulatively, have been cited more than 10,000 times.

Agarwal was awarded the University Scholar Award at the University of Illinois and the Distinguished Scholar-Teacher Award at the University of Maryland.
