= Ann Progulske-Fox =

Ann Progulske-Fox is an American oral biology researcher. She is a Distinguished Professor of Oral Biology at University of Florida College of Dentistry and a Fellow of the American Association for the Advancement of Science and National Academy of Inventors. Her research focuses on the molecular mechanisms of pathogenesis of Porphyromonas gingivalis.

== Early life and education ==
Progulske-Fox was born to parents Donald Robert Progulske and Eunice Miller Progulske, alongside three siblings. She earned her Bachelor of Science degree from South Dakota State University and attended the University of Massachusetts Amherst for her PhD. Following this, she enrolled at the University of Connecticut Health Center for her post-doctoral fellowship.

== Career ==
Upon receiving her PhD, Progulske-Fox accepted an assistant professor position at the University of Florida College of Dentistry in 1984.
