= Ronald A. Cohen =

American neuropsychologist (born 1955)

Ronald A. Cohen (born July 13, 1955) is an American neuropsychologist.

Cohen earned his bachelor's degree in psychology from Tulane University and a Ph.D. from Louisiana State University. He began teaching at the University of Massachusetts Medical School in 1983. In 1993, Cohen joined the faculty of Brown University, teaching at the Alpert Medical School. He moved to the University of Florida in 2012, and was appointed Evelyn F. McKnight chair for clinical translational research in cognitive aging and memory in 2015.
