= Mark Orazem =

American chemist

Mark E. Orazem is an American chemist, focusing electrochemical impedance spectroscopy, energy systems, corrosion and mathematical modeling, currently distinguished professor at University of Florida and previously the UF Research Foundation Professor.
