= Paul W. Davenport =

American physiologist

Paul W. Davenport is an American physiologist, focusing in the relationship between respiratory mechanics and the neural mechanisms of respiratory sensation, currently a distinguished professor at University of Florida.
