= Peter Hirschfeld =

American physicist

Peter J Hirschfeld
- Born: May 11, 1957 (age 69); Washington, D.C., U.S.
- Education: Princeton University
- Scientific career
- Fields: Physics
- Workplaces: University of Florida
- Doctoral advisor: P.S. Stein

Peter J. Hirschfeld is an American physicist, currently a distinguished professor at the University of Florida and an Elected Fellow of the American Physical Society. His lab is studying the problems of modern many-body theory associated with superconductivity and quantum materials.

== Education ==
Hirschfeld was an undergraduate and graduate student at Princeton University. He then took post-doctoral research positions at the Technical University of Munich and at Stanford University before joining the faculty at the University of Florida.

== Research ==
Hirschfeld and his research group investigate the theory behind superconductivity, electronic correlations and disorder. A particular emphasis is the study of new problems posed by the discovery in February 2008 of high-temperature Fe-based superconducting materials.

== Honors ==
Hirschfeld was the University of Florida Teacher/Scholar of the Year 2012-13.

He was elected Fellow of the American Physical Society in 2004, nominated by the Division of Condensed Matter Physics "For distinguished contributions to the theory of disordered unconventional superconductors which helped to identify d-wave pairing in the high-temperature superconductors."

In January 2022, he was one of three co-winners of the John Bardeen Prize.
