= Leonid Moroz =

Russian-American neuroscientist

Leonid L. Moroz is a Russian-American neuroscientist, focusing in neuroscience, comparative & evolutionary neurobiology, genomics and epigenomics, learning and memory and working in characterize basic mechanisms underlying the design of nervous systems and parallel evolution of neural circuits, neuronal signaling mechanisms and brains, currently the Distinguished Professor of Neuroscience, Genetics, Biology and Chemistry at University of Florida.
