= Duane Mitchell =

American physician and research scientist

Duane A. Mitchell
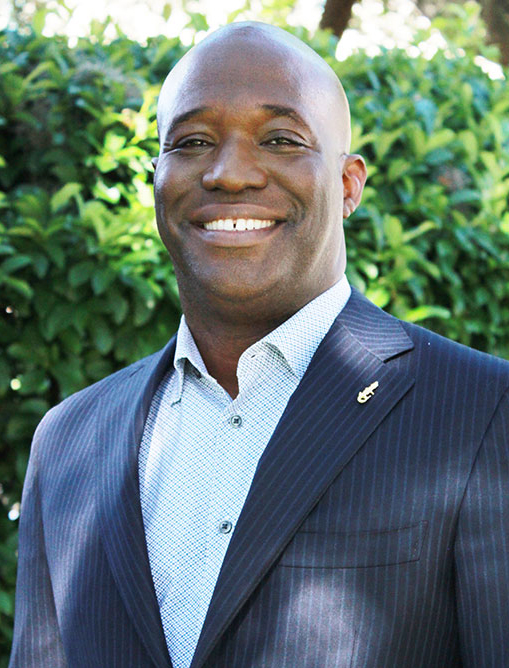
- Born: Duane Anthony Mitchell
- Education: Rutgers College; Duke University
- Scientific career
- Workplaces: Duke University; University of Florida
- Website: ufhealth.org/duane-mitchell

Duane A. Mitchell is an American physician-scientist and university professor. He is currently employed at the University of Florida College of Medicine, in Gainesville, Florida as the Assistant Vice President for Research, Associate Dean for Translational Science and Clinical Research, and Director of the University of Florida (UF) Clinical and Translational Science Institute. He is the Phyllis Kottler Friedman Professor in the Lillian S. Wells Department of Neurosurgery. and co-director of the Preston A. Wells Jr. Center for Brain Tumor Therapy. Mitchell is also the founder, President, and Chairman of iOncologi, Inc., a biotechnology company in Gainesville, FL specializing in immuno-oncology.

== Education ==
He graduated in 1993 with a degree in biology from Rutgers College in New Brunswick, and earned his Medical Degree (M.D.) and Ph.D. in Immunology from Duke University in Durham, North Carolina in 2001 as a graduate of the Medical Scientist Training Program (MSTP).

== Research and career ==
Mitchell leads a brain tumor program focused on clinical and translational research. His research in early-phase clinical trials on RNA-transfected dendritic cells in cancer immunotherapy found that the use of Dendritic Cells transfected with RNA is an effective therapeutic vaccination platform for patients with newly diagnosed glioblastoma.

Mitchell served on the faculty at Duke University Medical Center, where he held positions as the associate director of the Duke Brain Tumor Immunotherapy Program and Director of Preclinical Research at the Preston Robert Tisch Brain Tumor Center at Duke. Mitchell was recruited to UF in 2013 as the co-director of the Preston A. Wells Jr. Center for Brain Tumor Therapy and Director of the UF Brain Tumor Immunotherapy Program. He holds the State of Florida Endowed Cancer Research Chair at the UF College of Medicine and also serves in administrative leadership within the UF Health Cancer Center.

Mitchell was the recipient of the 2016 Top 10 Clinical Research Achievement Award for his research advancing immunotherapy for patients with glioblastoma. In 2023, he was the first recipient of the American Society for Clinical Investigation Louis W. Sullivan, MD, Award for research on new immunotherapy treatments for adults and children with malignant brain tumors.

He serves on the Scientific Advisory Boards for several organizations, including the National Cancer Institute Board of Scientific Counselors, National Pediatric Cancer Foundation, and National Brain Tumor Society.

== Publications ==
- Mitchell, Duane A.; Batich, Kristen A.; Gunn, Michael D.; Huang, Min-Nung; Sanchez-Perez, Luis; Nair, Smita K.; Congdon, Kendra L.; Reap, Elizabeth A.; Archer, Gary E.; Desjardins, Annick; Friedman, Allan H. (March 2015). "Tetanus toxoid and CCL3 improve dendritic cell vaccines in mice and glioblastoma patients". Nature. 519 (7543): 366–369. Bibcode:2015Natur.519..366M. doi:10.1038/nature14320. ISSN 1476-4687. PMC 4510871. PMID 25762141.
- Mitchell, Duane A.; Nair, Smita K. (2000-11-01). "RNA-transfected dendritic cells in cancer immunotherapy". The Journal of Clinical Investigation. 106 (9): 1065–1069. doi:10.1172/JCI11405. ISSN 0021-9738. PMC 301423. PMID 11067858.
- Mitchell, Duane A.; Nair, Smita K.; Gilboa, Eli (1998). "Dendritic cell/macrophage precursors capture exogenous antigen for MHC class I presentation by dendritic cells". European Journal of Immunology. 28 (6): 1923–1933. doi:10.1002/(SICI)1521-4141(199806)28:06<1923::AID-IMMU1923>3.0.CO;2-9. ISSN 1521-4141.
- Hoang-Minh, Lan B.; Mitchell, Duane A. (2018-10-11). "Immunotherapy for Brain Tumors". Current Treatment Options in Oncology. 19 (11): 60. doi:10.1007/s11864-018-0576-3. ISSN 1534-6277. PMID 30311004.
