= Miriam Zach =

American musicologist

- Born: Miriam Susan Zach; October 2, 1954 (age 71); Iowa
- Education: Northwestern University; University of Chicago; University of Florida, Ph.D.
- Known for: music & health research women composers pipe organ harpsichord
- Scientific career
- Fields: Conductor
- Workplaces: University of Florida; Iowa State University
- Doctoral advisor: David Z. Kushner

Miriam Susan Zach (born October 2, 1954 in Iowa) is an Iowa State University professor and musicologist residing in Gainesville, Florida known for her work in the study of women composers. Zach's published works in the area of female composers include a CD titled Hidden Treasures: 300 Years of Organ Music by Women Composers which was released in 1998 and the textbook For the Birds: Women Composers Music History Speller, and her collections of music and documentation about women composers formed the base of the International Women Composers' Library, a music history library of which Dr. Zach is the current director.

== Education and Professorship ==
Miriam Zach completed her undergraduate education at Northwestern University before moving on to graduate studies at the University of Chicago. Afterward, she left the United States and lived in Germany for 5 years, teaching piano at Bielefeld University.

She has taught music history and music and health courses at the University of Florida, where she held the position of Assistant Professor in the Honors Program. Currently she is the Charles and Mary Sukup Endowed Artist in Organ in the Department of Music and Theatre at Iowa State University where she teaches organ (on the Brombaugh pipe organ in the Mary-Ellen Tye Recital Hall) and harpsichord as well as music history and music and architecture courses.

== Awards and honors ==
Dr. Zach has earned several awards for her research and professorship. She earned the honor of being Professor of the Year for 2000-2001 at the University of Florida, one of the largest colleges in the United States.

Zach was also honored with the prestigious title of Charles and Mary Sukup Endowed Artist in Organ at Iowa State University in 2016.
