= University of Florida Division of Continuing Education =

School at the University of Florida

Coordinates: 29.6473°N 82.3457°W

The General Extension Division (GED) at the University of Florida was created by the state legislature in 1919. The General Extension Division was established as the extramural college to represent all of the state institutions of higher learning except in agriculture, home economics, and engineering. The head of extension was initially designated a director, but was later elevated to dean with the responsibility of making recommendations concerning policies, organization, staff, finance, and the development of the program. Originally, the Dean of General Extension reported solely to the President of the University of Florida, but later was accountable to all of the state's university presidents. GED's first and only dean was Bert C. Riley.

In 1944, General Extension included the following departments: Extension Teaching, the Public Service Training Center, located at the State College for Women, Department of Women's Activities, Department of Investigations and Research, Department of Information and Service, Department of Visual Instruction, and Department of Citizenship Training. GED's initial focus was towards non-credit, adult education, directed primarily at those without the benefit of a higher education and intended to promote consumer, business, and civic awareness. Gradually, the focus shifted to off-campus professional education.

In 1962, GED was abolished and the state legislature created the Florida Institute for Continuing University Studies (FICUS). FICUS had duties and responsibilities comparable to GED, but was independent of any university. FICUS was divided into several centers located in major urban areas of the state.

In 1965, the legislature abolished FICUS and each university was allowed to administer its own non-credit program and given specific responsibilities for off-campus credit programs. The University of Florida was also assigned responsibility for Home Study Courses and each university was placed in charge of an off-campus continuing education center. The Division of Continuing Education (DOCE) was created at the University of Florida to administer the University's program.

In 1972, the state's continuing education program was reorganized once again. Six of the state's nine state universities were given responsibilities for off-campus credit programs in specific counties. Florida State University, the University of Florida, and Florida A and M University were not assigned regional responsibilities, but were to provide credit courses on a state-wide basis in academic areas which could not be provided by the other universities.

In the summer of 2009, the University of Florida created the Office of the Associate Provost for Teaching and Technology to reflect the broadening mission of supporting teaching innovation at UF. Later that year, the Division of Continuing Education was placed under the Office of Teaching and Technology and officially changed its name to Distance & Continuing Education (DCE) to incorporate online education. In 2019, Distance & Continuing Education (DCE) was split into two units, the Office of Distance Learning (ODL), focused on for-credit programs including Flexible Learning, Dual Enrollment, Self-funded programs, and online proctoring; and the Office of Professional and Workforce Development (OPWD), focused on non-credit workforce programs that lead to licensure or certification.

== Mission ==
The mission of the Division of Continuing Education was to provide access to higher education opportunities through a variety of non-traditional approaches for non-traditional students. Today, ODL and OPWD still cater to non-traditional students with education programs at the undergraduate, graduate, professional, and workforce levels.
