= Eli Vakil =

Clinical neuropsychologist

- אלי וקיל
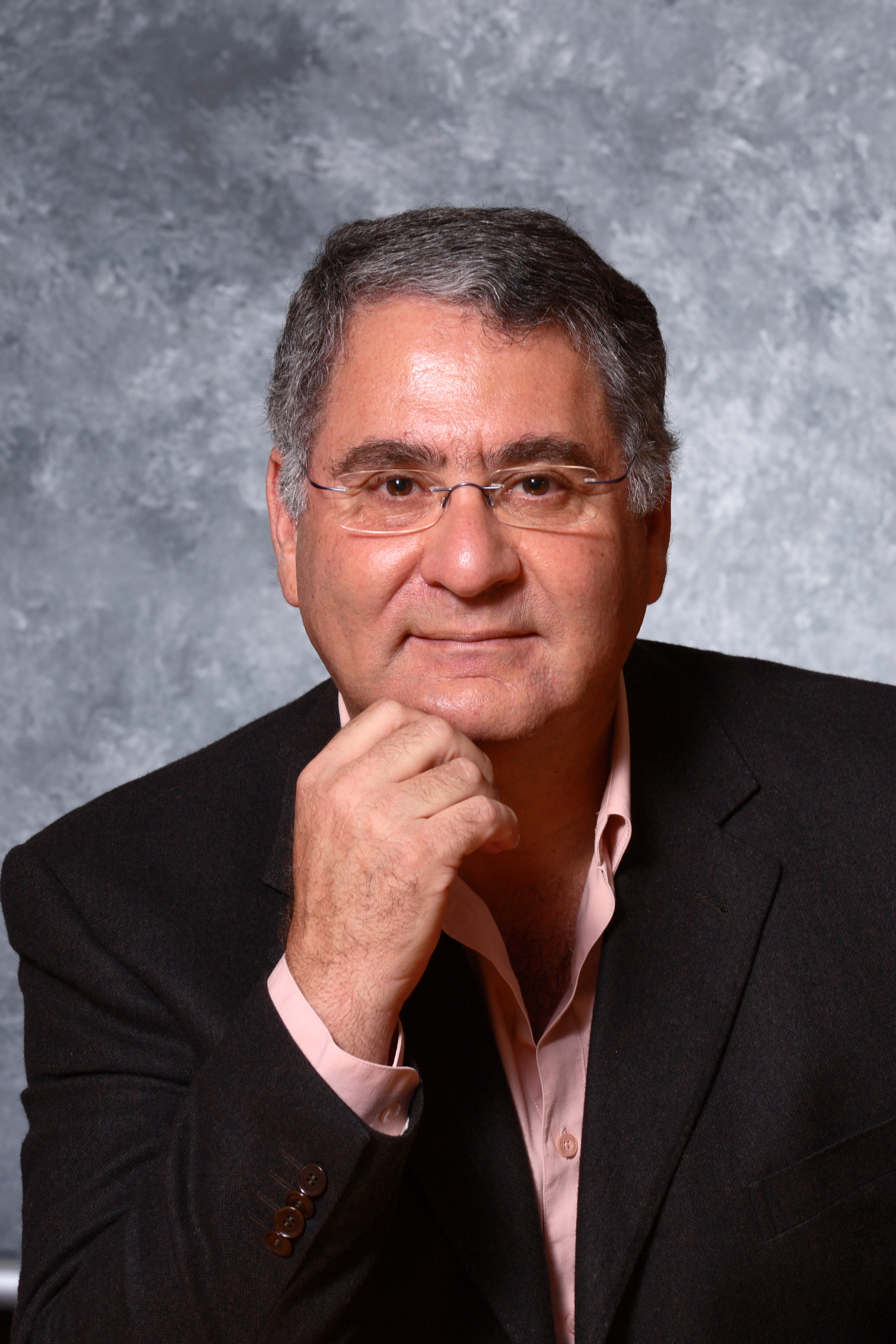
- Eli Vakil
- Born: March 4, 1953 (age 73); Tunisia
- Citizenship: Israeli
- Education: Bar Ilan University, CUNY Graduate Center
- Organization: Bar Ilan University
- Spouse: Tamar
- Children: 3
- Awards: Distinguished Career Award of the International Neuropsychological Society
- Website: faculty.biu.ac.il/~vakil/

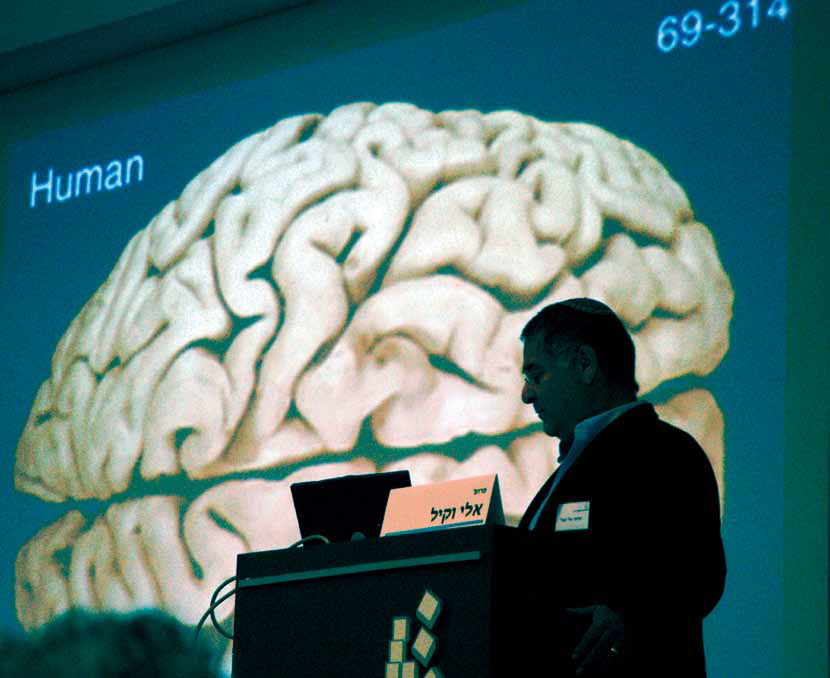
Eli Vakil by Rafi Kotz, 2007

Eli Vakil (Hebrew: אלי וקיל; born March 4, 1953) is an Israeli clinical neuropsychologist. He is a professor emeritus and former departmental chairman of the Department of Psychology, and the head of the Memory and Amnesia Lab at the Gonda (Goldschmied) Multidisciplinary Brain Research Center at Bar-Ilan University. He also served as the director of the Rehabilitation Center for Veterans after Traumatic Brain-Injury (TBI) in Jaffa, Israel.

== Biography ==
In 1974–1976, Vakil studied at Bar-Ilan University, Ramat-Gan, graduating with a B.A. in psychology. He received his Ph.D. in clinical neuropsychology from the Graduate Center of the City University of New York in 1985. His dissertation was titled: "Encoding of frequency of occurrence, temporal order, and spatial location information by closed-head-injured and elderly subjects: Is it automatic?"

Vakil is married with three children and lives in Ra'anana.

== Clinical career ==
Vakil started his career as a clinical neuropsychologist working in rehabilitation with patients who had sustained severe head injuries. He worked at the Head Trauma Program at the Rusk Institute of Rehabilitation Medicine in New York University Medical Center (1984–1985), and in the head of Recanati National Institute for the Rehabilitation of the head-injured person in Israel (1985-1987). and the director of the Rehabilitation Center for Veterans after Traumatic Brain-Injury (TBI) in Jaffa, Israel (2005-2021). He also served as the chairman of the Psychology Department in Bar-Ilan University from 2003-2005.

In the summer of 2017, he was a visiting scholar at the Kessler Foundation in West Orange, New Jersey.

Vakil was chairman of the rehabilitation psychology section in the Israeli Psychological Association.

He is a founding member of the Israeli Neuropsychological Society and has served as a board member of the International Neuropsychological Society (INS).

Vakil has served on the INS board of governors (2004–2007), as an associate editor of the Journal of the International Neuropsychological Society (JINS) (2004-2008).

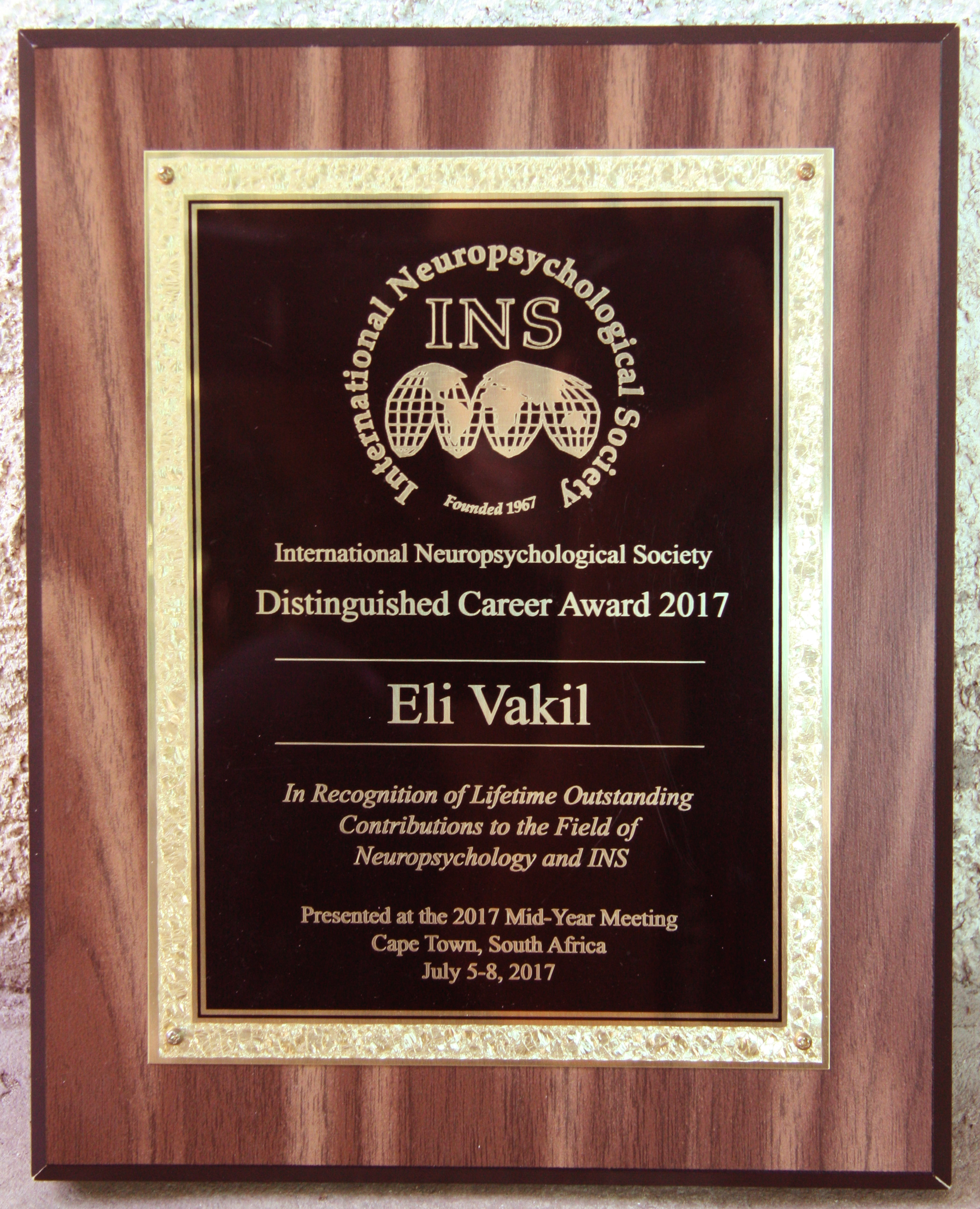
Distinguished Career Award of the International Neuropsychological Society (INS)

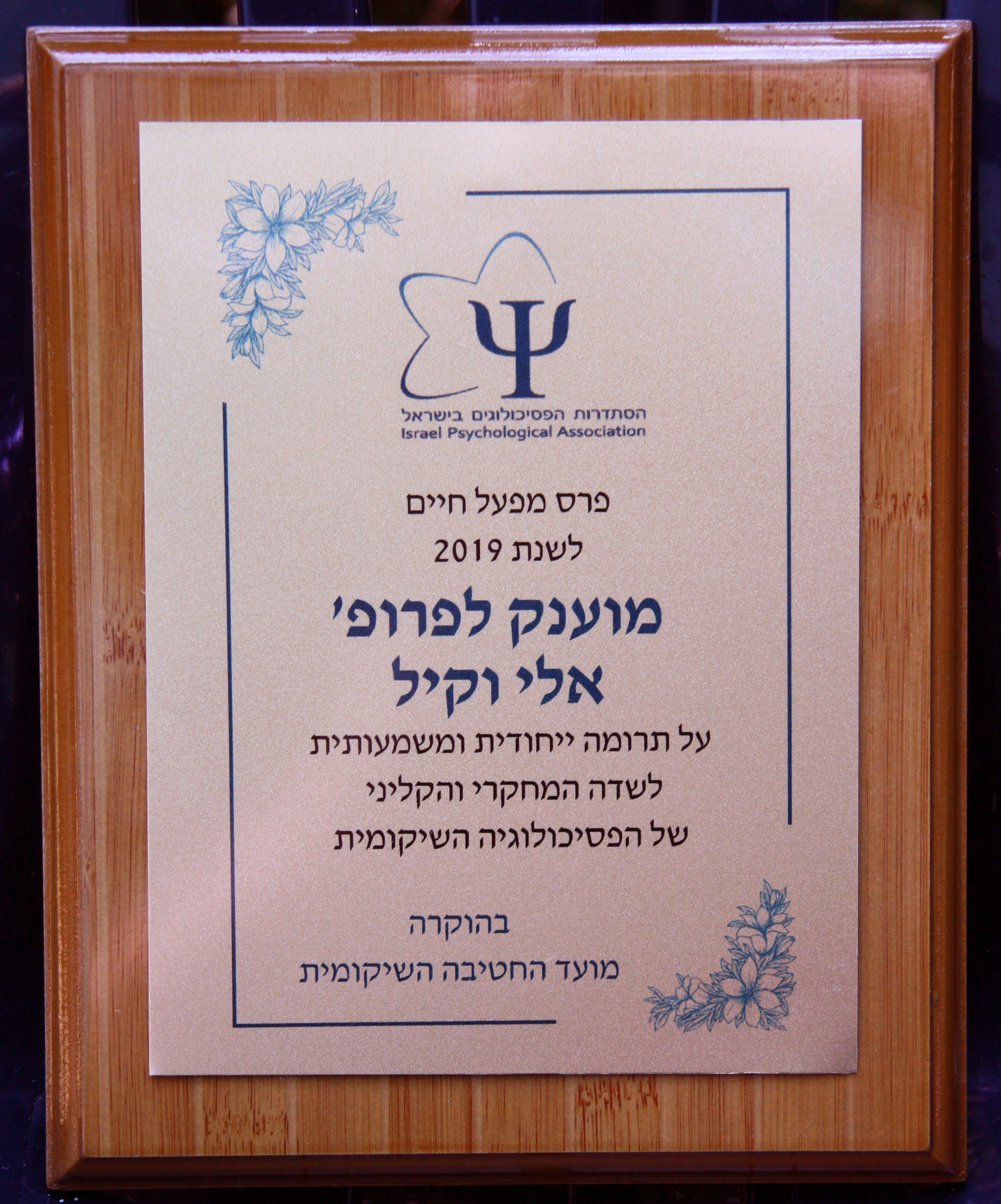
Lifetime Achievement Award from the Israeli Psychological Association - Rehabilitation Psychology, 2019

In 2017 he received the Distinguished Career Award of the International Neuropsychological Society (INS). In 2019 he received the Distinguished Career Award by the Israeli Psychological Association – Rehabilitation Psychology.

== Academic career ==
He is a professor emeritus and former departmental chairman of the Department of Psychology, and the head of the Memory and Amnesia Lab at the Gonda (Goldschmied) Multidisciplinary Brain Research Center at Bar-Ilan University.

Vakil has published extensively (over 180 scientific papers and book chapters) and presented at about 200 international scientific conferences, in the area of memory and memory disorders in various populations, such as traumatic brain injury patients, Parkinson’s disease patients, and the elderly.

- Associate editor of the Journal of the International Neuropsychological Society (JINS). The official journal of the International Neuropsychological Society (INS). (2004–2008).
- Chairman of the program/scientific committee of the mid-year meeting of the International Neuropsychological Society (INS) in Jerusalem Israel (2014)
- Member of the discussion group “Holocaust – Transmitted Memory and Fiction” Project for A Research Group and Workshop Van Leer Institute for Advanced Studies, Jerusalem (2013-2015).
- Visiting scholar at the Amnesia Research Laboratory (Professor Neal Cohen), Beckman Institute, University of Illinois at Urbana-Champaign, USA (1995-1996).
