= Clinical neuropsychology =

Sub-field of neuropsychology

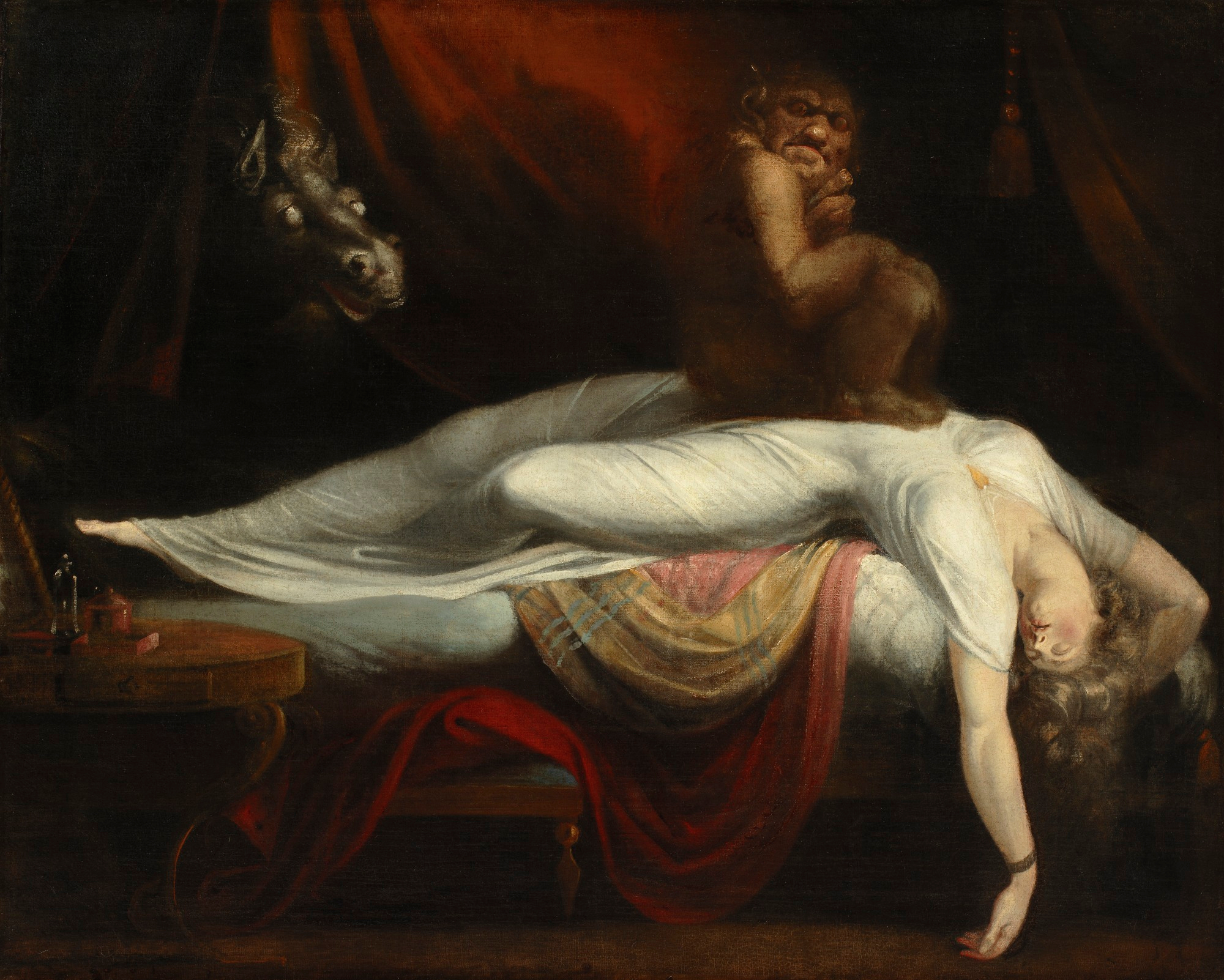
The Nightmare (oil on canvas, 1781), by John Henry Fuseli

Clinical neuropsychology is a subfield of psychology focused on the applied science of brain–behavior relationships. Clinical neuropsychologists apply their research to the assessment, diagnosis, treatment, and rehabilitation of patients with neurological, medical, neurodevelopmental, and psychiatric conditions. The branch of neuropsychology associated with children and young people is called pediatric neuropsychology.

Clinical neuropsychology is a specialized form of clinical psychology focused on research as a focal point of treatment within the field. For instance, a clinical neuropsychologist will be able to determine whether a symptom was caused by a traumatic injury to the head or by a neurological/psychiatric condition. Another focus of a clinical neuropsychologist is to find cerebral abnormalities.

Assessment is primarily by way of neuropsychological tests but also includes patient history, qualitative observation, neuroimaging, and other diagnostic medical procedures. Clinical neuropsychology requires an in-depth knowledge of neuroanatomy, neurobiology, psychopharmacology, and neuropathology.

== History ==
During the late 1800s, brain–behavior relationships were interpreted by European physicians who observed and identified behavioral syndromes that were related to focal brain dysfunction.

Clinical neuropsychology is a fairly new practice in comparison to other specialty fields in psychology, with a history going back to the 1960s. Parts of neurology, clinical psychology, psychiatry, cognitive psychology, and psychometrics have all been applied together to create clinical neuropsychology, a practice that is very much so still evolving. The history of clinical neuropsychology is long and complicated due to its ties to so many older practices. Researchers like Thomas Willis, who has been credited with creating neurology; John Hughlings Jackson, who theorized that cognitive processes occurred in specific parts of the brain; Paul Broca and Karl Wernicke, who studied the human brain in relation to psychopathology; and Jean Martin Charcot, who apprenticed Sigmund Freud, who created the psychoanalytic theory, all contributed to clinical medicine, which later contributed to clinical neuropsychology. The field of psychometrics contributed to clinical neuropsychology through individuals such as Francis Galton, who collected quantitative data on physical and sensory characteristics; Karl Pearson, who established the statistics that psychology now relies on; Wilhelm Wundt, who created the first psychology lab; his student Charles Spearman, who furthered statistics through discoveries like factor analysis; Alfred Binet and his apprentice Theodore Simon, who together made the Binet–Simon scale of intellectual development; and Jean Piaget, who studied child development. Studies in intelligence testing made by Lewis Terman, who updated the Binet–Simon scale to the Stanford–Binet Intelligence Scales; Henry Goddard, who developed different classification scales; and Robert Yerkes, who was in charge of the Army Alpha and Beta tests, also all contributed to where clinical neuropsychology is today.

Clinical neuropsychology focuses on the brain and goes back to the beginning of the 20th century. As a clinician, a clinical neuropsychologist offers their services by addressing three steps: assessment, diagnosis, and treatment. The term "clinical neuropsychologist" was first used by Sir William Osler on April 16, 1913. While clinical neuropsychology was not a focus until the 20th century, evidence of brain and behavior treatment and studies are seen as far back as the Neolithic era, when trephination, a crude surgery in which a piece of the skull is removed, was observed in skulls. During World War I, the early term "shell shock" was first observed in soldiers who survived the war. This was the beginning of efforts to understand traumatic events and how they affected people. During the Great Depression, further stressors caused shell shock-like symptoms to emerge. In World War II, the term "shell shock" was changed to "battle fatigue", and clinical neuropsychology became even more involved with attempting to solve the puzzle of people's continued signs of trauma and distress. The Veterans Administration, or VA, was created in 1930, which increased the call for clinical neuropsychologists and, by extension, the need for training. The Korean and Vietnam Wars further solidified the need for treatment by trained clinical neuropsychologists. In 1985, the term "post-traumatic stress disorder", or PTSD, was coined, and the understanding that traumatic events of all kinds could cause PTSD started to evolve.

The relationship between human behavior and the brain is the focus of clinical neuropsychology as defined by Meir in 1974. There are two subdivisions of clinical neuropsychology that draw much focus: organic and environmental natures. Ralph M. Reitan, Arthur L. Benton, and A.R. Luria are all past neuropsychologists who believed in and studied the organic nature of clinical neuropsychology. Alexander Luria is the Russian neuropsychologist responsible for the origination of clinical psychoneurological assessment after WWII. Building upon his originative contribution connecting the voluntary and involuntary functions influencing behavior, Luria further conjoins the methodical structures and associations of neurological processes in the brain. Luria developed the 'combined motor method' to measure thought processes based on the reaction times when three simultaneous tasks are appointed that require a verbal response. On the other side, the environmental nature of clinical neuropsychology did not appear until more recently and is characterized by treatments such as behavior therapy. The relationship between physical brain abnormalities and the presentation of psychopathology is not completely understood but is one of the questions that clinical neuropsychologists hope to answer in time.

In 1861, the debate over human potentiality versus localization began. The two sides argued over how human behavior is presented in the brain. Paul Broca postulated that cognitive problems could be caused by physical damage to specific parts of the brain based on a case study of his in which he found a lesion on the brain of a deceased patient who had presented the symptom of being unable to speak; that portion of the brain is now known as Broca's area. In 1874, Carl Wernicke also made a similar observation in a case study involving a patient with a brain lesion who was unable to comprehend speech; the part of the brain with the lesion is now deemed Wernicke's area. Both Broca and Wernicke believed in and studied the theory of localization. On the other hand, equal potentiality theorists believed that brain function was not based on a single piece of the brain but rather on the brain as a whole. Marie J.P. Flourens conducted animal studies in which he found that the amount of brain tissue damaged directly affected the amount that behavior ability was altered or damaged. Kurt Goldstein observed the same idea as Flourens except in veterans who had fought in World War I. In the end, despite all of the disagreement, neither theory completely explains the human brain's complexity. Thomas Hughlings Jackson created a theory that was thought to be a possible solution. Jackson believed that both potentiality and localization were in part correct and that behavior was made by multiple parts of the brain working collectively to cause behaviors, and Luria furthered Jackson's theory.

== Career ==
Clinical Neuropsychologist
Occupation
- Names: Clinical psychologist
- Occupation type: Specialty
- Activity sectors: Clinical Psychology, Medicine

Description
- Education required: Doctor of Psychology (Psy.D.) Or Doctor of Philosophy (Ph.D.)
- Fields of employment: Hospitals, clinics
- Related jobs: Neurologist, Psychiatrist

Neuropsychologists commonly work in hospitals. There are three main variations in which a clinical neuropsychologist may work at a hospital: as an employee, consultant, or independent practitioner. A clinical neuropsychologist working as an employee of a hospital would receive a salary and benefits and have a contract for employment. The hospital is in charge of legal and financial responsibilities for their neuropsychologists. The second option of working as a consultant implies that the clinical neuropsychologist is part of a private practice or is a member of a physicians' group. In this scenario, the clinical neuropsychologist may work in the hospital like an employee of the hospital, but all financial and legal responsibilities go through the group that the clinical neuropsychologist is a part of. The third option is to be an independent practitioner, who works alone and may even have their office outside of the hospital or rent a room in the hospital. In the third case, the clinical neuropsychologist is completely on their own and in charge of their own financial and legal responsibilities.

=== Assessment ===
Assessments are used in clinical neuropsychology to find brain psychopathologies of the cognitive, behavioral, and emotional variety. Physical evidence is not always readily visible, so clinical neuropsychologists must rely on assessments to tell them the extent of the damage. The cognitive strengths and weaknesses of the patient are assessed to help narrow down the possible causes of the brain pathology. A clinical neuropsychologist is expected to help educate the patient on what is happening to them so that the patient can understand how to work with their own cognitive deficits and strengths. An assessment should accomplish many goals, such as gauging consequences of impairments to quality of life, compiling symptoms and the change in symptoms over time, and assessing cognitive strengths and weaknesses. Accumulation of the knowledge earned from the assessment is then dedicated to developing a treatment plan based on the patient's individual needs. An assessment can also help the clinical neuropsychologist gauge the impact of medications and neurosurgery on a patient. Behavioral neurology and neuropsychology tools can be standardized or psychometric tests and observational data collected on the patient to help build an understanding of the patient and what is happening with them. There are essential prerequisites that must be present in a patient in order for the assessment to be effective: concentration, comprehension, motivation, and effort.

Although assessments have been done manually by neuropsychologists, advances have been made where AI is now being used to help make assessments easier to understand. In the 2010s, machine learning had already made progress, but it was only towards the 2020s that full access to AI led to massive improvements in performance as an assessment tool. Machine learning originally had its first fast advances in 2017, which are reviewed in an academic journal by Frontiers in Aging Neuroscience. They discovered that machine learning was an aid in neuropsychological tests to find out if someone has Alzheimer's, in comparison to whether they find a different cognitive dysfunction within the patient. It is recorded that machine learning has high accuracy in its assessment of individuals who may have cognitive impairment.

Since the 2020s, full implementation of AI for diagnostics has become apparent when its use exists for clinical neuropsychology by using it to primarily assess whether someone has Alzheimer’s. AI has become prevalent for leading in the early diagnosis of discovering whether someone is slowly developing Alzheimer's. It has been noted that machine learning has been more effective in assessment in comparison to human neurologists. Machine learning has been noted as having an accuracy that is not inefficient; the use of support vector machines (SVM) had a quoted accuracy of 77.17%.

Lezak lists six primary reasons neuropsychological assessments are carried out: diagnosis, patient care and its planning, treatment planning, treatment evaluation, research, and forensic neuropsychology. To conduct a comprehensive assessment will typically take several hours and may need to be conducted over more than a single visit. Even the use of a screening battery covering several cognitive domains may take 1.5–2 hours. At the start of the assessment, it is important to establish a good rapport with the patient and ensure they understand the nature and aims of the assessment.

Neuropsychological assessment can be carried out from two basic perspectives, depending on the purpose of assessment. These methods are normative or individual. Normative assessment involves the comparison of the patient's performance against a representative population. This method may be appropriate in the investigation of an adult-onset brain insult such as traumatic brain injury or stroke. Individual assessment may involve serial assessment to establish whether declines are beyond those that are expected to occur with normal aging, as with dementia or another neurodegenerative condition.

Assessment can be further subdivided into the following sub-sections:

- History taking

Neuropsychological assessments usually commence with a clinical interview as a means of collecting a history, which is relevant to the interpretation of any later neuropsychological tests. In addition, this interview provides qualitative information about the patient's ability to act in a socially apt manner, organize and communicate information effectively, and provide an indication as to the patient's mood, insight, and motivation. It is only within the context of a patient's history that an accurate interpretation of their test data and thus a diagnosis can be made. The clinical interview should take place in a quiet area free from distractions. Important elements of a history include demographic information, a description of the presenting problem, medical history (including any childhood or developmental problems and psychiatric and psychological history), educational and occupational history, and any legal history and military history.

- Performing a set of neuropsychological tests

It is not uncommon for patients to be anxious about being tested; explaining that tests are designed so that they will challenge everyone and that no one is expected to answer all questions correctly may be helpful. An important consideration of any neuropsychological assessment is a basic coverage of all major cognitive functions. The most efficient way to achieve this is the administration of a battery of tests covering attention, visual perception and reasoning, learning and memory, verbal function, construction, concept formation, executive function, motor abilities, and emotional status. Beyond this basic battery, choices of neuropsychological tests to be administered are mainly made on the basis of which cognitive functions need to be evaluated in order to fulfill the assessment objectives.

- Report writing

Following a neuropsychological assessment, it is important to complete a comprehensive report based on the assessment conducted. The report is for other clinicians, as well as the patient and their family, so it is important to avoid jargon or the use of language that has different clinical and lay meanings (e.g., "intellectually disabled" as the correct clinical term for an IQ below 70, but offensive in lay language). The report should cover the background to the referral, relevant history, reasons for assessment, neuropsychologist's observations of the patient's behavior, tests administered and results for cognitive domains tested, any additional findings (e.g., questionnaires for mood), and finish the report with a summary and recommendations. It is important to comment on what the profile of results indicates regarding the referral question. The recommendations section contains practical information to assist the patient and family or improve the management of the patient's condition.

== Educational requirements of different countries ==
The educational requirements for becoming a clinical neuropsychologist differ between countries. In some countries, it may be necessary to complete a clinical psychology degree before specializing with further studies in clinical neuropsychology, while other countries offer clinical neuropsychology courses to students who have completed 4 years of psychology studies. All clinical neuropsychologists require a postgraduate qualification, whether it be a master's or doctorate (PhD, PsyD, or D.Psych).

=== Australia ===
To become a clinical neuropsychologist in Australia requires the completion of a 3-year Australian Psychology Accreditation Council (APAC)-approved undergraduate degree in psychology, a 1-year psychology honors, followed by a 2-year master's or 3-year doctorate of psychology (D.Psych) in clinical neuropsychology. These courses involve coursework (lectures, tutorials, practicals, etc.), supervised practice placements, and the completion of a research thesis. Master's and D.Psych courses involve the same amount of coursework units but differ in the amount of supervised placements undertaken and length of research thesis. Master's courses require a minimum of 1,000 hours (125 days) and D.Psych courses require a minimum of 1,500 hours (200 days). It is mandatory that these placements expose students to acute neurology/neurosurgery, rehabilitation, psychiatric, geriatric, and pediatric populations.

=== Canada ===
To become a clinical neuropsychologist in Canada requires the completion of a 4-year honors degree in psychology and a 4-year doctoral degree in clinical neuropsychology. Often, a 2-year master's degree is required before commencing the doctoral degree. The doctoral degree involves coursework and practical experience (practicum and internship). Practicum is between 600 and 1,000 hours of practical application of skills acquired in the program. At least 300 hours must be supervised, face-to-face client contact. The practicum is intended to prepare students for the internship/residency. Internships/residencies are a year-long experience in which the student functions as a neuropsychologist, under supervision. Currently, there are 3 CPA-accredited clinical neuropsychology internships/residencies in Canada, although other unaccredited ones exist. Prior to starting the internship, students must have completed all doctoral coursework and received approval for their thesis proposal (if they have not completed the thesis) and the 600 hours of practicum.

=== United Kingdom ===
To become a clinical neuropsychologist in the UK, a prior qualification as a clinical or educational psychologist as recognized by the Health Professions Council, followed by further postgraduate study in clinical neuropsychology, is required. In its entirety, education to become a clinical neuropsychologist in the UK consists of the completion of a 3-year British Psychological Society-accredited undergraduate degree in psychology, a 3-year doctorate in clinical (usually D.Clin.Psy.) or educational psychology (D.Ed.Psy.), followed by a 1-year master's (MSc) or 9-month postgraduate diploma (PgDip) in clinical neuropsychology. The British Psychological Division of Counselling Psychology is also currently offering training to its members in order to ensure that they can apply to be registered neuropsychologists too.

=== United States ===
To become a clinical neuropsychologist in the US and be compliant with Houston Conference Guidelines, the completion of a 4-year undergraduate degree in psychology and a 4- to 5-year doctoral degree (PsyD or PhD) must be completed. After the completion of the doctoral coursework, training, and dissertation, students must complete a 1-year internship, followed by an additional 2 years of supervised residency. The doctoral degree, internship, and residency must all be undertaken at American Psychological Association-approved institutions. After the completion of all training, students must apply to become licensed in their state to practice psychology. The American Board of Clinical Neuropsychology, the American Board of Professional Neuropsychology, and the American Board of Pediatric Neuropsychology all award board certification to neuropsychologists that demonstrate competency in specific areas of neuropsychology by reviewing the neuropsychologist's training, experience, and submitted case samples and successfully completing both written and oral examinations. Although these requirements are standard according to Houston Conference Guidelines, even these guidelines have stated that the completion of all of these requirements is still aspirational, and other ways of achieving clinical neuropsychologist status are possible.

== Journals ==
The following represents an (incomplete) listing of significant journals in or related to the field of clinical neuropsychology.

- Aging, Neuropsychology and Cognition
- Applied Neuropsychology
- Archives of Clinical Neuropsychology
- Archives of Neurology
- Brain
- Child Neuropsychology
- The Clinical Neuropsychologist
- Cognitive Neuropsychology
- Cortex
- Developmental Neuropsychology
- Journal of Clinical and Experimental Neuropsychology
- Journal of Cognitive Neuroscience
- Journal of the International Neuropsychological Society
- Journal of Neuropsychology
- Neurocase
- Neuropsychologia
- Neuropsychological Rehabilitation
- Neuropsychology
- Neuropsychology Review
- Psychological Assessment

== See also ==
- Abnormal psychology
- Neurolaw
- Neuropsychological test
- Neuropsychological assessment
- Neuropsychology
