= Jennifer Manly =

American neuropsychologist

- Known for: Roles of culture and education in cognitive aging and Alzheimer's disease

Academic background
- Education: UC Berkeley (BA/BS); SDSU/UCSD (PhD)
- Thesis: The effect of African American acculturation on neuropsychological test performance (1996)
- Doctoral advisor: Igor Grant

Jennifer J. Manly is an American neuropsychologist. She is a Professor of Neuropsychology in Neurology at the Gertrude H. Sergievsky Center and the Taub Institute for Research in Aging and Alzheimer's Disease at Columbia University. Manly studies how race, culture, socioeconomic status, and education influence the risk of cognitive decline in aging.

== Early life and education ==
Manly completed her graduate training in neuropsychology through the Joint Doctoral Program in Clinical Psychology at San Diego State University and the University of California, San Diego. She completed a clinical internship at Brown University as well as a postdoctoral fellowship in neuropsychology at Columbia University.

== Career ==
Manly joined the faculty at the G.H. Sergievsky Center and the Taub Institute for Research in Aging and Alzheimer's Disease at Columbia in 1998. There, she studied Alzheimer's disease (AD) among racially, ethnically, and culturally diverse populations. She demonstrated that childhood educational experiences, such as quality of schooling, location and setting of school, reading level, and academic achievement, was a strong predictor of cognitive decline risk across groups, and that disparities in dementia prevalence between racial groups could be explained by educational disparities. Manly and her research team led a subsequent study of 3,000 middle-aged adults to understand the differential contribution of AD risk factors to cognitive decline in different racial groups. They found that cognitive decline in Latinos and African Americans was associated more with vascular and social biomarkers than with genetic pathways affecting amyloid deposition as seen in white counterparts. She also led a study which demonstrated that found that dementia prevalence was inversely correlated with access to more schooling and better education growing up. Manly is now Professor of Neuropsychology in Neurology at Columbia University.

== Awards and honors ==
Manly has served on the Alzheimer's Association Medical and Scientific Research Board and the HHS Advisory Council on Alzheimer's Research, Care, and Services.

- 1994 Dorathe Frick Memorial Award
- 2003 Early Career Award, APA Division of Clinical Neuropsychology
- 2005 Fellow, APA Division of Clinical Neuropsychology
- 2006 Early Career Award, National Academy of Neuropsychology
- 2014 Tony Wong Diversity Award for Outstanding Mentorship, National Academy of Neuropsychology
- 2019 Litrownik Distinguished Alumni Scholar Award, SDSU/UC San Diego Joint Doctoral Program in Clinical Psychology
- 2020 Paul Satz Career Mentoring Award, International Neuropsychological Society for her "extraordinary commitment to providing mentorship to future generations of neuropsychologists."
- 2021 Elected member, National Academy of Medicine
