= Archives of Scientific Psychology =

- Discipline: Psychology
- Language: English
- Edited by: Cecil R. Reynolds

Publication details
- History: 2013-2021
- Publisher: American Psychological Association (United States)
- Frequency: Continuous
- Open access: Yes

Standard abbreviations
- ISO 4: Arch. Sci. Psychol.

Indexing
- ISSN: 2169-3269
- LCCN: 2012203289
- OCLC no.: 855860016

Links
- Journal homepage; Online archive

Archives of Scientific Psychology was an open access academic journal published by the American Psychological Association. The journal published articles pertaining to various sub-fields of psychology, including neuroscience and political psychology. Cecil R. Reynolds (Texas A&M University) served as its editor-in-chief. It is abstracted and indexed in PsycINFO.

The journal's policy mandated data sharing, but received criticism for its implementation of the practice.

The journal ceased publishing as of July 1st 2021.
