= Paul Satz =

American psychologist (1932-2010)

Paul Satz (September 12, 1932 – June 20, 2010) was an American psychologist, and one of the founders of the discipline neuropsychology. His research on the relationship between the brain and human behavior spanned diverse topics including laterality, handedness, and developmental disorders. He published over 300 publications, received numerous grants and awards, and established the first neuropsychology lab. Towards the latter part of his career, Satz's research interests focused more on the cognitive deficits associated with head injury, dementia, and ageing.

== Early life and education ==
Paul Satz was born in Ware, Massachusetts, to Leo and Milly Satz. He was the elder to his three siblings George, Ada and Ruth. Shortly after graduating high school, he moved to Florida to attend the University of Miami. From the University of Miami, Satz received both his Bachelor's degree (1957) and his Master's degree in clinical psychology (1959). He then went on to complete his PhD in clinical psychology at the University of Kentucky, under the supervision of Jesse Harris. In 1963, the American Institutes for Research (AIR) awarded Satz the Creative Talent Award, for his dissertation work (The Block Rotation Task); a task used to predict organic brain disorder. The same year, he began a post-doctoral position at the University of Florida within the Department of Psychiatry.

== Research career ==
A year after beginning his post-doc at the University of Florida (UF), Satz accepted a faculty position from UF's chair of the Department of Clinical Psychology, Dr. Louis Cohen. As a UF faculty member, he created UF's first neuropsychology subspecialty, and opened the first neuropsychology research laboratory. Along with colleague Ken Heilman, Satz developed UF's first course in neuropsychology, Human Higher Brain Function, which is still offered to graduate students today. At this point in time, Satz's research interests included developmental disorders such as dyslexia, as well as handedness, laterality and how these relate to speech and language processes.

Satz's neuropsychology laboratory, the first of its kind, focused on providing graduate students with a comprehensive training in this new-found area, neuropsychology. He received his first National Institutes of Health grant to study predictors of childhood dyslexia. His students assisted in what would become the Florida Longitudinal Project, which studied developmental dyslexia in students from Kindergarten through sixth grade. In addition to NIH grants supporting his work in children, Satz also received NIH funding to conduct handedness and laterality studies in adults. His work on cerebral dominance and reading disabilities was recognized by the International Reading Association in 1977 when he was awarded the Albert J. Harris Award.

Satz assisted in the founding of the International Neuropsychological Society (INS), and became its president in 1974. He left the University of Florida in 1979. Before accepting a position at the University of California, Los Angeles (UCLA) in 1981, Satz spent two short years at the University of Victoria. While at UCLA, Satz founded the neuropsychology program at the Semel Institute for Neuroscience and Human Behavior. His work on laterality, handedness and learning disabilities received many accolades; in 1988, the American Board of Professional Psychology awarded Satz its Meritorious Service Award, and in 1996 he received the American Psychological Association Award for Distinguished Professional Contributions to Knowledge.

=== Handedness, laterality, and developmental disorders ===
The most notable of Satz's work include his studies on left-handedness, how handedness relates to brain laterality, and the relationship between hand preference, brain laterality and developmental disorders. In one of his earlier studies, Satz found that self-reported hand preference in left-handers was unreliable, and that left-handers vary more in speech laterality than right-handers. Another seminal study by Satz and colleagues included their 1971 publication theorizing that there is no single mechanism underlying the developmental disorder dyslexia. Instead, the authors suggested and provided evidence that the disorder involves multiple lags in central nervous system maturation and that the behavioral manifestations are linked to developmental ages. For many years, Satz went on to publish a number of studies on pathological left-handedness (PHL); PHL is considered left-handedness as a result of head injuries to the left side of the brain.

== Personal life ==
In the 1960s Paul Satz married his wife Gladys, and they had three children: Mark, Julie, and Scott. He died on June 20, 2010, from cancer.

== Notable publications ==
- Satz, P., & Mogel, S. (1962). An abbreviation of the WAIS for clinical use. Journal of Clinical Psychology, 18(1), 77-79.
- Satz, P. (1966). A block rotation task: The application of multivariate and decision theory analysis for the prediction of organic brain disorder. Psychological Monographs: General and Applied, 80(21), 1.
- Satz, P., Achenbach, K., & Fennell, E. (1967). Correlations between assessed manual laterality and predicted speech laterality in a normal population. Neuropsychologia, 5(4), 295-310.
- Satz, P., Rardin, D., & Ross, J. (1971). An evaluation of a theory of specific developmental dyslexia. Child Development, 2009-2021.
- Satz, P. (1972). Pathological left-handedness: An explanatory model. Cortex, 8(2), 121-135.
- Satz, P. (1973). Left-handedness and early brain insult: An explanation. Neuropsychologia, 11(1), 115-117.
- Satz, P., & Morris, R. (1981). Learning disability subtypes: A review. Neuropsychological and cognitive processes in reading, 109-141.
- Satz, P., Orsini, D. L., Saslow, E., & Henry, R. (1985). The pathological left-handedness syndrome. Brain and cognition, 4(1), 27-46.
- Satz, P. (1993). Brain reserve capacity on symptom onset after brain injury: a formulation and review of evidence for threshold theory. Neuropsychology, 7(3), 273.
- Satz, P., Zaucha, K., McCleary, C., Light, R., Asarnow, R., & Becker, D. (1997). Mild head injury in children and adolescents: A review of studies (1970–1995). Psychological bulletin, 122(2), 107.
