= Indre Viskontas =

Lithuanian-Canadian neuroscientist and operatic soprano

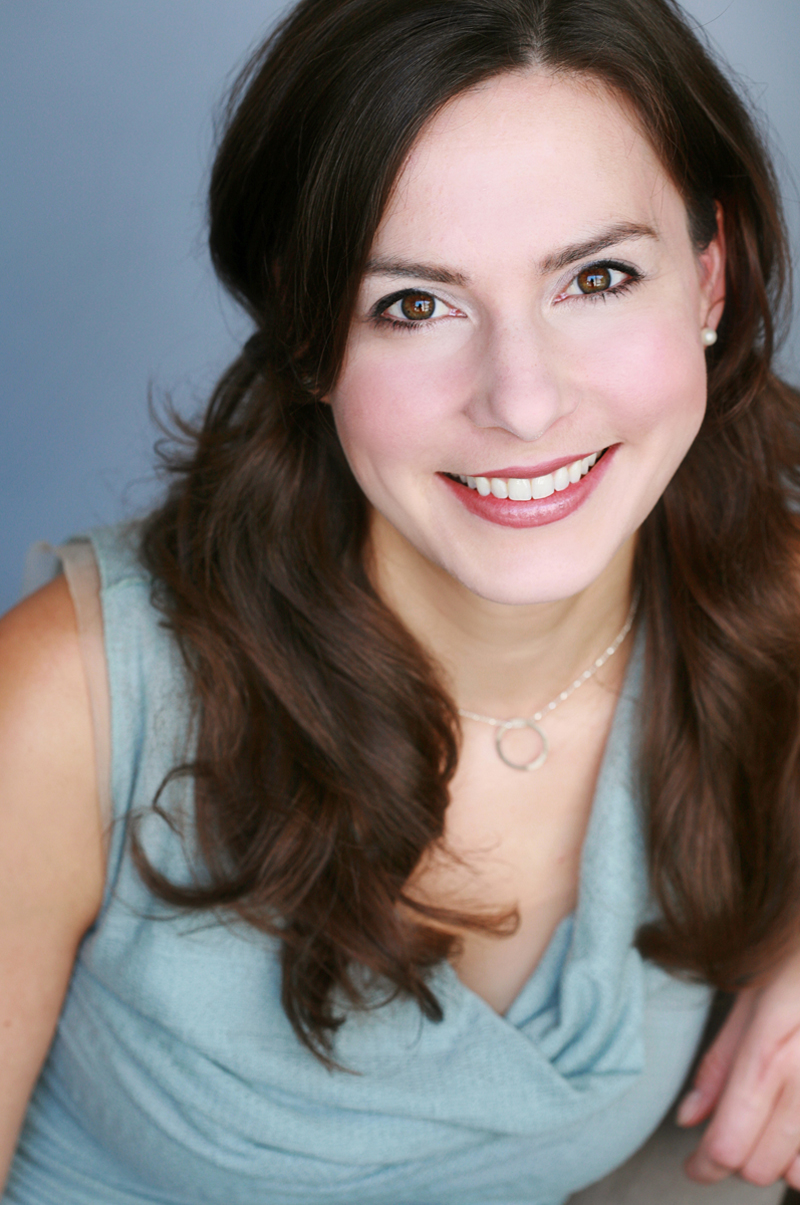
- Education: University of California, Los Angeles, PhD (2006); San Francisco Conservatory of Music, MM (2008)
- Scientific career
- Fields: Neuroscience, opera
- Workplaces: San Francisco Conservatory of Music, University of California, San Francisco, University of San Francisco
- Website: http://www.indreviskontas.com/

Indre Viskontas is a Lithuanian-Canadian neuroscientist and operatic soprano. She holds a Ph.D. in cognitive neuroscience from the University of California, Los Angeles (UCLA). While at UCLA she was a member of the Bjork Learning and Forgetting Lab and Cogfog. and a M.M. in opera. She is a Professor of Psychology at the University of San Francisco and serves on the faculty at the San Francisco Conservatory of Music. She is also the Creative Director of Pasadena Opera.

== Early life ==
Viskontas's parents emigrated from Lithuania to Canada just after World War II, and Viskontas grew up in Toronto.

== Scientific career ==
Viskontas's research has explored the neurological basis of memory, reasoning and self-identity, while also studying creativity in people with neurodegeneration. Techniques used in her research include single-unit recording in patients with epilepsy, high-resolution functional magnetic resonance imaging, eye-movement tracking, voxel-based morphometry, and various behavioral tasks in healthy adults, patients with epilepsy, and patients with neurodegenerative diseases such as frontotemporal dementia, semantic dementia and Alzheimer's disease. She has published over 50 research articles and book chapters. Her research projects also include teaching people with cochlear implants how to sing.

Viskontas is affiliated with the Memory and Aging Program at the University of California at San Francisco and is an editor of the journal Neurocase.

== Musical career ==
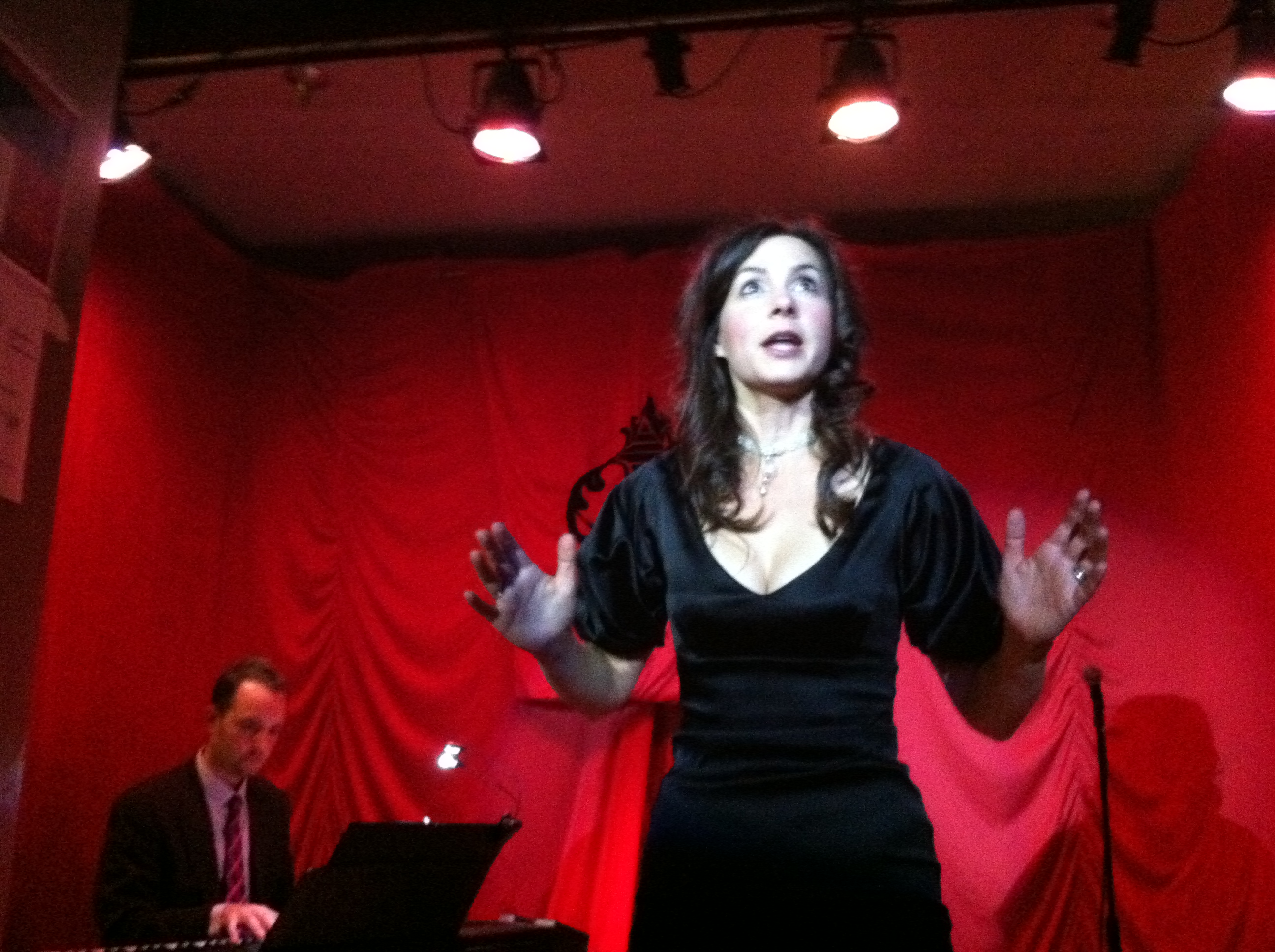
Indre Viskontas performing with Opera on Tap: San Francisco at Cafe Royal on October 22, 2012. Photograph by Erica Mu.

Born to a choral conductor, Viskontas sang in choirs since she was 5 years old. She has studied opera since she was a young child and performed for the Canadian Opera Company when she was only 11 years old. She continued to study music throughout her life even while working towards her Ph.D. in neuroscience. Upon receiving her Ph.D. from University of California, Los Angeles (UCLA), she began working on her Master of Music degree at the San Francisco Conservatory of Music. She earned that degree in 2008, once again graduating as her class valedictorian.

Viskontas has performed as a soprano for numerous roles, including Beth in Mark Adamo's Little Women, Kate in John Estacio's Frobisher, Heart's Desire in Arthur Sullivan's The Rose of Persia and Aurelia in Purcell's Dioclesian. She is a soloist with San Francisco chamber groups and is the co-founder and director of Vocallective, an organization of musicians that promotes the art of vocal chamber music. Indre Viskontas is also a co-founder of Opera on Tap, "a non-profit organization whose mission is to make opera as ubiquitous and accessible as pop music".

She is also the Creative Director of Pasadena Opera. At Pasadena Opera, she has directed an opera, based on an Oliver Sacks case study, called The Man Who Mistook His Wife for a Hat.

== Media and appearances ==
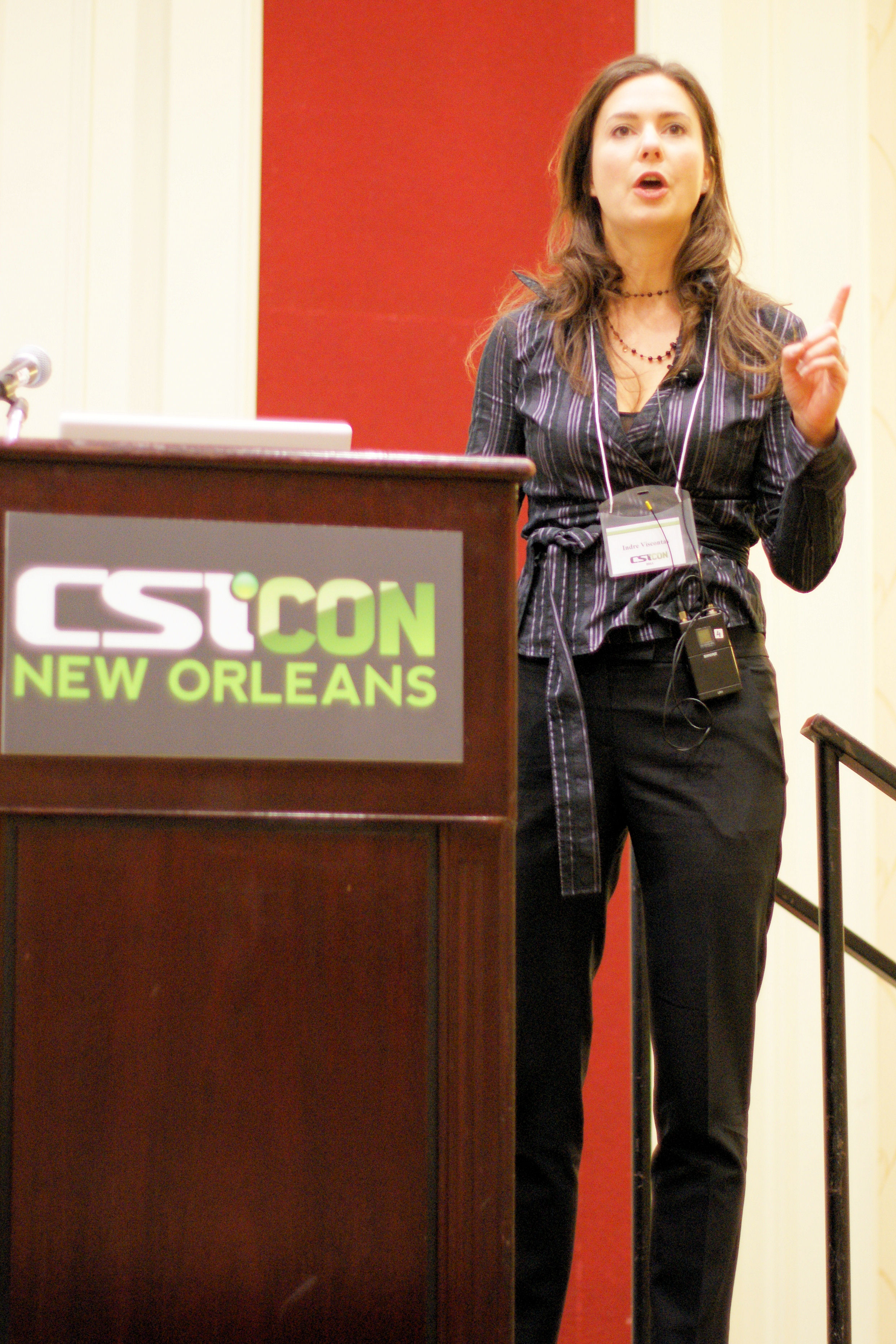
Viskontas at CSICon 2011.

Viskontas uses her performance skills to communicate science through online lectures and as host of two podcasts and a television series. She co-hosted a television show called Miracle Detectives with Randall Sullivan. Six episodes aired on the Oprah Winfrey Network beginning in January 2011. The show's topics included claims of supernatural healing and other reported miracles. According to Viskontas, her role on Miracle Detectives was to "get people to think more deeply about what they believe without threat or disrespect."

In 2012 Viskontas joined Chris Mooney as co-host of Point of Inquiry, "The Radio Show and Podcast of the Center for Inquiry". In June 2013 Viskontas, Mooney, and show producer Adam Isaak resigned from the Center for Inquiry and started their own new podcast, Inquiring Minds. The first episode of the new podcast was released in September 2013.

Viskontas has appeared on television shows including The Oprah Winfrey Show, Entertainment Tonight, CNN, Access Hollywood, E!, and TV Guide. She has contributed to podcasts including Token Skeptic, This Week in Science, and Strange Frequencies Radio.

Viskontas participated in a panel discussion on skepticism and the media at the 2011 Committee for Skeptical Inquiry convention CSICon in New Orleans. She participated again at CSICon 2012 in Nashville on a panel discussion on memory and belief.

She has also appeared in the NPR program City Arts & Lectures and The Sunday Edition on the CBC in Canada. In 2017, she co-hosted the web series Science in Progress for Tested.com and VRV.

== Books ==
In 2019, Viskontas authored the book How Music Can Make You Better – ISBN 1452171920, in which she talks about how music affects our brains, bodies and society at large. She mentions the different purposes of music including multi-sensory, visual, auditory and healing benefits.
