= Randy Kamphaus =

American psychologist and academic administrator

Randy W. Kamphaus is an American psychologist, researcher, and academic administrator who works in psychological assessment and child mental health. He is currently a Professor Emeritus at the University of Oregon College of Education and is Research Professor at the for External Affairs at the Ballmer Institute for Children's Behavioral Health at the University of Oregon. He is also Professor Emeritus at the Georgia State University. He is known for co-developing the Behavior Assessment System for Children (BASC) with Cecil Reynolds.

== Education ==
Kamphaus earned his Ph.D. in Educational Psychology from the University of Georgia in 1983, where he specialized in school psychology. He also holds an M.A. in General Psychology from the University of Illinois Springfield in 1976 and a B.A. in Psychology from Quincy University in 1974, where he also earned a secondary teaching certificate in social studies.

== Academic career ==
Kamphaus was a Research Professor at the University of Georgia, as well as department head. He was the acting executive director of the Ballmer Institute for Children’s Behavioral Health in Portland, Oregon.

He was Dean of the College of Education at Georgia State University from 2007 to 2012, and then at the University of Oregon from 2014 to 2020.

== Research ==
Kamphaus is known as the co-developer, along with Cecil Reynolds, of the Behavior Assessment System for Children (BASC), a psychological assessment tool designed to evaluate behavioral and emotional functioning in children and adolescents.
