= Daniel Tranel =

American neurologist (born 1957)

Daniel T. Tranel
- Born: October 20, 1957 (age 68)
- Education: University of Iowa (Doctor of Philosophy, Clinical Psychology, 1982); University of Notre Dame (Bachelor of Arts, Psychology, 1979)

Daniel T. Tranel (born October 20, 1957) is an American professor of neurology, psychological and brain sciences, and clinical neuropsychologist at the University of Iowa. He has been recognized as a fellow of the American Association for the Advancement of Science. While a graduate student at the University of Iowa, he helped establish the Iowa Neurological Patient Registry, which he currently directs. The Iowa Neurological Patient Registry includes cases of unique brain injuries, such as Patient S.M. and Patient E.V.R. Tranel also directs the Interdisciplinary Graduate Program in Neuroscience at the University of Iowa. He serves as editor-in-chief of the Journal of Clinical and Experimental Neuropsychology and is a contributing author to the 5th edition of Neuropsychological Assessment, a classic textbook in neuropsychology used by most neuropsychologists.

Tranel researches brain-behavior relationships in humans. He uses the lesion method, neuropsychological testing, and functional imaging (including PET and fMRI) to study topics such as retrieval of knowledge and words, emotion, decision-making, fact-processing, nonconscious processing, memory, and psychophysiology. Tranel has authored over 600 research papers and been cited more than 80,000 times. His discoveries include determining that nouns and verbs are stored in separate parts of the brain and that patients with prosopagnosia have physical responses to familiar faces despite lack of conscious recognition.

Tranel rejected the graduate school application of Aurora theater gunman James Holmes.

On September 24, 2024 Tranel will be awarded the Daryl and Nancy Granner Distinguished Mentor Award by the University of Iowa Carver College of Medicine. The announcement for his Distinguished Mentor Celebration states, "He has an outstanding record of selflessly mentoring students, post-doctoral trainees, and faculty. He is an exceptional mentor whose mentees have gone on to distinguished careers of their own. He is also nationally and internationally recognized for his pioneering research in neuropsychology." He has considerable influence over students' education and training as he holds positions of Associate Dean of Graduate and Postdoctoral Studies and Senior Director of Clinical Neuropsychology Fellowship. As well as professorships in the Neurology, as well as Psychological and Brain Sciences. Tranel is also a co-director of the iDREAM post-baccalaureate program in Neuroscience at University of Iowa.
