= Stephen Nadeau =

American behavioral neurologist

Stephen E. Nadeau
- Born: December 9, 1947 (age 78); Cairo, Egypt
- Occupations: Behavioral neurologist, researcher and academic

Academic background
- Education: S.B., Chemical Physics (1970); S.B., Political Science (1970); MD (1977)
- Alma mater: Massachusetts Institute of Technology; University of Florida

Academic work
- Institutions: University of Florida College of Medicine; Veterans Affairs Medical Center

Stephen E. Nadeau (born 1947) is an American behavioral neurologist, researcher and academician. He is a Professor of Neurology at the University of Florida College of Medicine. He is also the Associate Chief of Staff for Research at the Malcolm Randall Department of Veterans Affairs Medical Center.

Nadeau's research is focused in the areas of neurorehabilitation; behavioral neuroscience; language and aphasia; and connectionist approaches to brain function. He has written over 150 papers. In 2012, he wrote the book, The Neural Architecture of Grammar.

He is a fellow of the American Academy of Neurology.

== Early life and education ==
Nadeau was born in Cairo, Egypt. He attended the Massachusetts Institute of Technology, where he completed an S.B. in Chemical Physics and an S.B. in Political Science in 1970. He received his MD from University of Florida College of Medicine in 1977. Nadeau later completed his medical internship and neurology residency at the University of Florida College of Medicine in Gainesville, Florida, and went on to a behavioral neurology fellowship with Kenneth Heilman.

== Career ==
Nadeau spent his junior faculty years at the University of Mississippi Medical Center in Jackson and returned to the Department of Neurology at the University of Florida in 1987. He has been a Professor of Neurology and Clinical and Health Psychology since 1995. He was Chief of the Neurology Service at the North Florida/South Georgia Veterans Health System (Malcom Randall VA Medical Center) in Gainesville from 2008 to 2013 and since then has been the Associate Chief of Staff for Research.

Nadeau has been an active clinician throughout his career, serving as a general neurologist with special expertise in dementia, stroke, headache, chronic pain, and neurological manifestations of vasculitis and connective tissue disease.

He has been the medical director of two VA Office of Research and Development funded research centers, the Brain Rehabilitation Research Center and the Rehabilitations Outcomes Research Center.

=== Research ===
Nadeau's research interests have focused primarily on the neural basis of language function, neuroplasticity and neurorehabilitation. His most cited paper on language function dissected the neural and vascular mechanisms by which aphasia might occur with subcortical lesions. It provided evidence that the basal ganglia have little role in language function and that acute/subacute strokes involving select regions of the thalamus (the anterior pole, internal medullary lamina, and centromedian/parafascicular nuclei) produce at least transient lexical-semantic dysfunction. Subsequent work leveraged the discoveries of scientists of parallel distributed processing to understand how it is possible for the brain to support complex functions like language.

Nadeau has sought to test the ability of the cardinal properties of PDP networks to account for language breakdown in aphasia in many languages and in bilingual speakers and polyglots, and more recently, to account for cognitive functions in general, and the mechanisms of the basal ganglia and thalamus. He, with his colleagues, has sought to extend the concept of population encoding networks to the development of language therapies for patients with aphasia that generalize to untrained material and to everyday conversation, and to elucidate potential mechanisms that could be leveraged to achieve generalization.

Nadeau's research has included clinical trials of rehabilitation following stroke and the treatment of depression.

== Awards and honors ==
- 1998 - Fellow, American Academy of Neurology
- 2011 - J Brooks Brown Research Award for Outstanding Achievement, Contributions to Rehabilitation Science, Inspiration, and Service to Research

== Books ==
- Aphasia and Language: Theory to Practice (2000)
- Medical Neuroscience (2004)
- The Neural Architecture of Grammar (2012)
- Cognitive Changes and the Aging Brain (2020)
