= International Neuropsychological Society =

Professional society

- Abbreviation: INS
- Formation: 1967
- Type: Learned society
- Legal status: Non-profit organization
- Headquarters: 2319 Foothill Drive #260, Salt Lake City, Utah, United States
- Members: ~4,950 (2008)
- President: Keith O. Yeates
- Publication: Journal of the International Neuropsychological Society
- Website: www.the-ins.org

The International Neuropsychological Society is an international non-profit learned society dedicated to promoting research in neuropsychology. It was established in 1967 with only a few members, with its membership growing to about 5,000 by 2015. Its first president was Karl H. Pribram. It was originally founded as the European International Neuropsychology Society, and was renamed to its current name in 1973. Its official journal is the Journal of the International Neuropsychological Society.

== Presidents ==
Presidents of the International Neuropsychological Society include:

- Karl H. Pribram (1967–1968)
- Raymond Denner (1969–1970)
- Arthur Benton (1971)
- Norman Geschwind (1972)
- Allan Mirsky (1973)
- Paul Satz (1974)
- Louis Costa (1975)
- Harold Goodglass (1976)
- Marcel Kinsbourne (1977)
- Aaron Smith (1978)
- Edith Kaplan (1979)
- Manfred Meie (1980)
- Byron Rourke (1981)
- Ken Heilman (1982)
- Dirk Bakker (1983)
- Nelson Butter (1984)
- Freda Newcombe (1985)
- Hallgrim Kløve (1986)
- Muriel Lezak (1987)
- Otfried Spreen (1988)
- Harvey Levin (1989)
- Neil Brooks (1990)
- Charles Matthews (1991)
- Linas Bieliauska (1992)
- Barbara C. Wilson (1993)
- Don Stuss (1994)
- Gerald Goldstein (1995)
- Steven Matti (1996)
- Marilyn Albert (1997)
- H. Julia Hannay (1998)
- Kenneth Adams (1999)
- Martha Denckla (2000)
- Laird Cerma (2000)
- Castro Caldas (2001)
- Leslie J. Gonzalez-Rothi (2002)
- Elizabeth Warrington (2003)
- Jason Brandt (2004)
- Robert Heaton (2005)
- Barbara A. Wilson (2006)
- Igor Grant (2007)
- Jack Fletcher (2008)
- Michael Corballis (2009)
- Stephen Rao (2010)
- Rus Baue (2011)
- Sandra Weintraub (2012)
- Jennie Ponsford (2013)
- Erin Bigler (2014)
- Ann D. Watt (2015)
- Kathleen Haaland (2016)
- Michael Kopelman (2017)
- Keith O. Yeates (2018)
- Vicki Anderson (2019)
- Margaret O'Connor (2020)
- Skye McDonald (2021)
- Ida Sue Baron (2022)
- Jon Evans (2023)
- David Loring (2024)
- Natalia Ojeda del Pozo (2025)
