= Andrew Cherlin =

American sociologist (born 1948)

Andrew J. Cherlin (9 September 1948) is an American sociologist, focusing on family life in the U.S. and around the world. He is an emeritus professor of sociology at Johns Hopkins University. A social demographer, he is a former president of the Population Association of America. His books include The Marriage-Go-Round: The State of Marriage and the Family in America Today (2009) and Labor's Love Lost: The Rise and Fall of the Working-Class Family in America (2014). He is an Elected Fellow of the National Academy of Sciences, the American Academy of Arts and Sciences, and the American Academy of Political and Social Science.

His most highly cited article is "The Deinstitutionalization of American Marriage" (2004) in which he argued that marriage has evolved from a "marker of conformity" to a "marker of prestige," and he introduced the term "capstone marriage." He is also the author of a leading textbook for courses on the sociology of family life, Public and Private Families: An Introduction.

== Awards ==
In 2003, he received Distinguished career award by the family section of the American sociological association ASA.

In 2009, he received the Irene B. Taeuber award from the PAA, in recognition of the accomplishments in demographic research.
