= Tranel =

Tranel is a given name and surname.

Notable people with the given name include:

- Tranel Hawkins (born 1962), American hurdler

Notable people with the surname include:

- Daniel Tranel (born 1957), American professor of neurology
- Monica Tranel (born 1966), American rower and lawyer
- Travis Tranel (born 1985), American politician

== See also ==
- Mestranol
