= Subfields of psychology =

Psychology subdisciplines

Psychology encompasses a vast domain, and includes many different approaches to the study of mental processes and behavior. Below are the major areas of inquiry that taken together constitute psychology. A comprehensive list of the sub-fields and areas within psychology can be found at the list of psychology topics and list of psychology disciplines.

== Divisions ==
=== Abnormal ===
Abnormal psychology is the study of abnormal behavior in order to describe, predict, explain, and change abnormal patterns of functioning. Abnormal psychology studies the nature of psychopathology and its causes, and this knowledge is applied in clinical psychology to treat patients with psychological disorders.

It can be difficult to draw the line between normal and abnormal behaviors. In general, abnormal behaviors must be maladaptive and cause an individual significant discomfort in order to be of clinical and research interest. According to the DSM-IV-TR, behaviors may be considered abnormal if they are associated with disability, personal distress, the violation of social norms, or dysfunction.

=== Anomalistic ===
Anomalistic psychology is the study of human behaviour and experience connected with what is often called the paranormal, without the assumption that there is anything paranormal involved. Researchers involved with anomalistic psychology try to provide plausible non-paranormal accounts, supported by empirical evidence, of how psychological and physical factors might combine to give the impression of paranormal activity when there had been none. Apart from deception or self-deception such explanations might involve cognitive biases, anomalous psychological states, dissociative states, hallucinations, personality factors, developmental issues and the nature of memory. A notable researcher in the field of anomalistic psychology is the British psychologist Chris French who set up the Anomalistic Psychology Research Unit (APRU) in the Department of Psychology at Goldsmiths, University of London.

=== Behavioral genetics ===
Behavioural genetics uses genetically informative designs to understand the nature and origins of individual differences in behavior. In focusing on the causes of individual differences, behavioral genetics is distinct from evolutionary psychology, which tends to focus on human universals. Behavioral genetics has thus been associated strongly with the diathesis stress model of psychopathology as well as the nature/nurture debate. Behavioral genetics research was pioneered by Francis Galton and his seminal work in family studies and twin studies after falling out of favor during the eugenics movement during the first part of the 20th century up until World War II. A resurgence of behavioral genetics research began in the 1960s and rose into prominence in the 1980s and beyond. During this time twin study and adoption studies were conducted on a wide array of behavioral traits, including personality, cognitive ability, psychiatric illness, medical illness, and many others. The general conclusion of this large body of work is that every behavioral and medical trait, and indeed measures of the environment is heritable to some moderate degree. Taking advantage of the Human Genome Project more recent work in behavioral genetics uses recent technologies in array-based genotyping, genome sequencing, and other omics to measure genetic variants directly. These genetic variants can then be tested for association with behavioral traits and disorders, for example through genome-wide association studies. This approach to understanding the genetic influences on behavior have seen recent successes in, for example, schizophrenia. Psychiatric genetics is a subfield of behavioral genetics.

=== Biological ===
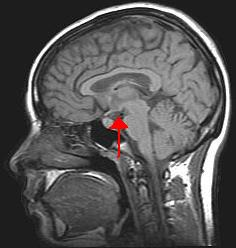
MRI depicting the human brain. The arrow indicates the position of the hypothalamus.

Biological psychology is the scientific study of the biological substrates of behavior and mental states. Seeing all behavior as intertwined with the nervous system, biological psychologists feel it is sensible to study how the brain functions in order to understand behavior. This is the approach taken in behavioral neuroscience, cognitive neuroscience, and neuropsychology. Neuropsychology is the branch of psychology that aims to understand how the structure and function of the brain relate to specific behavioral and psychological processes. Neuropsychology is particularly concerned with the understanding of brain injury in an attempt to work out normal psychological function. Cognitive neuroscientists often use neuroimaging tools, which can help them to observe which areas of the brain are active during a particular task.

=== Clinical ===
Clinical psychology includes the study and application of psychology for the purpose of understanding, preventing, and relieving psychologically based distress or dysfunction and to promote subjective well-being and personal development. Central to its practice are psychological assessment and psychotherapy, although clinical psychologists may also engage in research, teaching, consultation, forensic testimony, and program development and administration. Some clinical psychologists may focus on the clinical management of patients with brain injury—this area is known as clinical neuropsychology. In many countries clinical psychology is a regulated mental health profession.

The work performed by clinical psychologists tends to be influenced by various therapeutic approaches, all of which involve a formal relationship between professional and client (usually an individual, couple, family, or small group). The various therapeutic approaches and practices are associated with different theoretical perspectives and employ different procedures intended to form a therapeutic alliance, explore the nature of psychological problems, and encourage new ways of thinking, feeling, or behaving. Four major theoretical perspectives are psychodynamic, cognitive behavioral, existential-humanistic, and systems or family therapy. There has been a growing movement to integrate the various therapeutic approaches, especially with an increased understanding of issues regarding culture, gender, spirituality, and sexual-orientation. With the advent of more robust research findings regarding psychotherapy, there is evidence that most of the major therapies are about of equal effectiveness, with the key common element being a strong therapeutic alliance. Because of this, more training programs and psychologists are now adopting an eclectic therapeutic orientation.

=== Cognitive ===
Cognitive psychology studies cognition, the mental processes underlying mental activity. Perception, learning, problem solving, reasoning, thinking, memory, attention, language and emotion are areas of research. Classical cognitive psychology is associated with a school of thought known as cognitivism, whose adherents argue for an information processing model of mental function, informed by functionalism and experimental psychology.

On a broader level, cognitive science is an interdisciplinary enterprise of cognitive psychologists, cognitive neuroscientists, researchers in artificial intelligence, linguists, human–computer interaction, computational neuroscience, logicians and social scientists. Computational models are sometimes used to simulate phenomena of interest. Computational models provide a tool for studying the functional organization of the mind whereas neuroscience provides measures of brain activity.

=== Community ===
Community psychology deals with the relationships of the individual to communities and the wider society. Community psychologists seek to understand the quality of life of individuals, communities, and society. Their aim is to enhance quality of life through collaborative research and action.

Community psychology makes use of various perspectives within and outside of psychology to address issues of communities, the relationships within them, and people's attitudes about them. Through collaborative research and action, community psychologists (practitioners and researchers) seek to understand and to enhance quality of life for individuals, communities, and society. Community psychology takes a public health approach and focuses on prevention and early intervention as a means to solve problems in addition to treatment. Rappaport (1977) discusses the perspective of community psychology as an ecological perspective with the person-environment fit being the focus of study and action instead of attempting to change the person or the environment when an individual is seen as having a problem.

=== Comparative ===
Comparative psychology refers to the study of the behavior and mental life of animals other than human beings. It is related to disciplines outside of psychology that study animal behavior such as ethology. Although the field of psychology is primarily concerned with humans the behavior and mental processes of animals is also an important part of psychological research. This being either as a subject in its own right (e.g., animal cognition and ethology) or with strong emphasis about evolutionary links, and somewhat more controversially, as a way of gaining an insight into human psychology. This is achieved by means of comparison or via animal models of emotional and behavior systems as seen in neuroscience of psychology (e.g., affective neuroscience and social neuroscience).

=== Consulting ===
Consulting psychology includes the application of psychology to consulting contexts at the individual, group and organizational levels. The field specializes in assessment and intervention, particularly in business and organizational applications but also is concerned with the consulting process used to assess and facilitate change in any area of psychology. Lowman (2002) provides an overview of the field, including the relevance of individual, group and organizational levels to consulting psychologists.

=== Counseling ===
Counseling psychology seeks to facilitate personal and interpersonal functioning across the lifespan with a focus on emotional, social, vocational, educational, health-related, developmental, and organizational concerns. Counselors are primarily clinicians, using psychotherapy and other interventions in order to treat clients. Traditionally, counseling psychology has focused more on normal developmental issues and everyday stress rather than psychopathology, but this distinction has softened over time. Counseling psychologists are employed in a variety of settings, including universities, hospitals, schools, governmental organizations, businesses, private practice, and community mental health centers.

=== Cyber ===
Cyberpsychology is the study of the psychological processes related to, and underlying, technologically interconnected human behavior. Cyberpsychologists use psychological theory and research to explain online behaviour, and to investigate how connected technologies influence how we think, feel and behave. Areas in cyberpsychology include the psychology of online dating and relationships, online learning, online working, online gaming, online shopping, online gambling, online crime, online media (including social media), virtual reality, augmented reality and online entertainment. Cyberpsychology is a recognised subfield of psychology that has a dedicated section within the British Psychological Society (BPS).

=== Developmental ===
Mainly focusing on the development of the human mind through the life span, developmental psychology seeks to understand how people come to perceive, understand, and act within the world and how these processes change as they age. This may focus on intellectual, cognitive, neural, social, or moral development. Researchers who study children use a number of unique research methods to make observations in natural settings or to engage them in experimental tasks. Such tasks often resemble specially designed games and activities that are both enjoyable for the child and scientifically useful, and researchers have even devised clever methods to study the mental processes of small infants. In addition to studying children, developmental psychologists also study aging and processes throughout the life span, especially at other times of rapid change (such as adolescence and old age). Developmental psychologists draw on the full range of theorists in scientific psychology to inform their research.

=== Differential ===
Differential psychology studies the ways in which individuals differ in their personality, cognition, emotion, and behavior. There is a focus on the measurement of individual differences.

=== Educational ===
Educational psychology is the study of how humans learn in educational settings, the effectiveness of educational interventions, the psychology of teaching, and the social psychology of schools as organizations. The work of child psychologists such as Lev Vygotsky, Jean Piaget and Jerome Bruner has been influential in creating teaching methods and educational practices. Educational psychology is often included in teacher education programs, at least in North America, Australia, and New Zealand.

=== Environmental ===
Environmental psychology is an interdisciplinary field focused on the interplay between humans and their surroundings. The field defines the term environment broadly, encompassing natural environments, social settings, built environments, and learning environments. Since its conception, the field has been committed to the development of a discipline that is both value oriented and problem oriented, prioritizing research aiming at solving complex environmental problems in the pursuit of individual well-being within a larger society.

=== Evolutionary ===
Evolutionary psychology explores the evolutionary roots of mental and behavioral patterns, and posits that common patterns may have emerged because they were highly adaptive for humans in the environments of their evolutionary past—even if some of these patterns are maladaptive in today's environments. Fields closely related to evolutionary psychology are animal behavioral ecology, human behavioral ecology, dual inheritance theory, and sociobiology. Evolutionary psychology is distinct from, although related to, behavioral genetics. Memetics, founded by Richard Dawkins, is a related but competing field that proposes that cultural evolution can occur in a Darwinian sense but independently of Mendelian mechanisms; it therefore examines the ways in which thoughts, or memes, may evolve independently of genes.

=== Forensic ===
Forensic psychology applies psychology to legal cases, covering a broad range of practices including the clinical evaluations of defendants, reports to judges and attorneys, and courtroom testimony on given issues. Forensic psychologists are appointed by the court or hired by attorneys to evaluate defendants' competency to stand trial, competency to be executed, sanity, and need for involuntary commitment. Forensic psychologists provide sentencing recommendations, evaluate sex offenders and treatments, and provide recommendations to the court through written reports and testimony. Many of the questions the court asks the forensic psychologist go ultimately to legal issues, although a psychologist cannot answer legal questions. For example, there is no definition of sanity in psychology. Rather, sanity is a legal definition that varies from place to place throughout the world. Therefore, a prime qualification of a forensic psychologist is an intimate understanding of the law, especially criminal law.

=== Health ===
Health psychology is the application of psychological theory and research to health, illness and health care. Whereas clinical psychology focuses on mental health and neurological illness, health psychology is concerned with the psychology of a much wider range of health-related behavior including healthy eating, the doctor-patient relationship, a patient's understanding of health information, and beliefs about illness. Health psychologists may be involved in public health campaigns, examining the impact of illness or health policy on quality of life and in research into the psychological impact of health and social care.

=== Industrial-organizational ===
Industrial and organizational psychology (I-O) applies psychological concepts and methods to optimize human potential in the workplace. Personnel psychology, a subfield of I-O psychology, applies the methods and principles of psychology in selecting and evaluating workers. I-O psychology's other subfield, organizational psychology, examines the effects of work environments and management styles on worker motivation, job satisfaction, and productivity.

=== Legal ===
Legal psychology is a research-oriented field populated with researchers from several different areas within psychology (although social and cognitive psychologists are typical). Legal psychologists explore such topics as jury decision-making, eyewitness memory, scientific evidence, and legal policy. The term "legal psychology" has only recently come into use, and typically refers to any non-clinical law-related research.

=== Moral ===
Moral psychology is an interdisciplinary field of research focusing on moral values, judgment, behavior, and other topics at the intersection of ethics and psychology.

=== Media ===
Media psychology seeks an understanding of the relationships between mediated communication and the thoughts, feelings, and behaviors of the senders and recipients of the communication. For instance, a media psychologist might determine that depressed individuals are especially likely to watch television.

=== Occupational health ===
Occupational health psychology (OHP) is a discipline that emerged from health psychology, industrial/organizational psychology, and occupational health. OHP is concerned with identifying psychosocial characteristics of workplaces that give rise to problems in physical (e.g., cardiovascular disease) and mental health (e.g., depression). OHP has investigated such psychosocial characteristics of workplaces as workers' decision latitude and supervisors' supportiveness. OHP also concerns itself with interventions that can prevent or ameliorate work-related health problems. Such interventions have important, beneficial implications for the economic success of organizations. Other research areas of concern to OHP include workplace violence, unemployment, and workplace safety. Two exemplary OHP journals are the Journal of Occupational Health Psychology and Work & Stress. Two prominent OHP professional organizations are the European Academy of Occupational Health Psychology and the Society for Occupational Health Psychology.

=== Personality ===
Personality psychology studies enduring patterns of behavior, thought, and emotion in individuals, commonly referred to as personality. Theories of personality vary across different psychological schools and orientations. They carry different assumptions about such issues as the role of the unconscious and the importance of childhood experience. According to Freud, personality is based on the dynamic interactions of the ego, superego, and id. Trait theorists, in contrast, attempt to analyze personality in terms of a discrete number of key traits by the statistical method of factor analysis. The number of proposed traits has varied widely. An early model proposed by Hans Eysenck suggested that there are three traits that comprise human personality: extraversion-introversion, neuroticism, and psychoticism. Raymond Cattell proposed a theory of 16 personality factors. The Big Five personality traits, proposed by Lewis Goldberg, currently has strong support among trait theorists.

=== Quantitative ===
Quantitative psychology involves the application of mathematical and statistical modeling in psychological research, and the development of statistical methods for analyzing and explaining behavioral data. The term "Quantitative psychology" is relatively new and little used (only recently have Ph.D. programs in quantitative psychology been formed), and it loosely covers the longer standing subfields psychometrics and mathematical psychology.

Psychometrics is the field of psychology concerned with the theory and technique of psychological measurement, which includes the measurement of knowledge, abilities, attitudes, and personality traits. Measurement of these phenomena is difficult, and much research has been developed to define and analyze such phenomena. Psychometric research typically involves two major research tasks, namely: (i) the construction of instruments and procedures for measurement; and (ii) the development and refinement of theoretical approaches to measurement.

Mathematical psychology is the subdiscipline that is concerned with the development of psychological theory in relation with mathematics and statistics. Basic topics in mathematical psychology include measurement theory and mathematical learning theory as well as the modeling and analysis of mental and motor processes. Psychometrics is more associated with educational psychology, personality, and clinical psychology. Mathematical psychology is more closely related to psychonomics/experimental and cognitive, and physiological psychology and (cognitive) neuroscience.

=== Religion/spirituality ===
Psychology of religion and spirituality is the psychological study of religious and spiritual experiences, beliefs, activities, and feelings. This subfield has existed since modern psychology's early days, and is the focus of Division 36 of the American Psychological Association. William James (1842–1910) is regarded by most psychologists of religion/spirituality as the founder of the field, and his Varieties of Religious Experience is considered to be a classic work in the field. Since 2008, the American Psychological Association has published a journal dedicated to this subfield, entitled the Psychology of Religion and Spirituality. In recent decades, scholars have increasingly conceptualized religion as a way of living, rather than merely a belief system or institution. Religion and spirituality are commonly viewed as distinct but overlapping constructs. Surveys indicate that large majorities of US adults consider religion and/or spirituality to be very important in their lives. Scientific and psychological interest in the psychology of religion/spirituality has increased substantially in recent decades. The American Psychological Association now publishes many books on the topic of religion/spirituality. The Association's publications include the recent (2013) two-volume Handbook of Psychology, Religion, and Spirituality, with Volume One focusing on theory, and Volume Two focusing on applications.

=== School ===
School psychology combines principles from educational psychology and clinical psychology to understand and treat students with learning disabilities; to foster the intellectual growth of "gifted" students; to facilitate prosocial behaviors in adolescents; and otherwise to promote safe, supportive, and effective learning environments. School psychologists are trained in educational and behavioral assessment, intervention, prevention, and consultation, and many have extensive training in research. Currently, school psychology is the only field in which a professional can be called a "psychologist" without a doctoral degree, with the National Association of School Psychologists (NASP) recognizing the specialist degree as the entry level. This is a matter of controversy as the APA does not recognize anything below a doctorate as the entry level for a psychologist. Specialist-level school psychologists, who typically receive three years of graduate training, function almost exclusively within school systems, while those at the doctoral-level are found in a number of other settings as well, including universities, hospitals and private practice.

=== Social ===
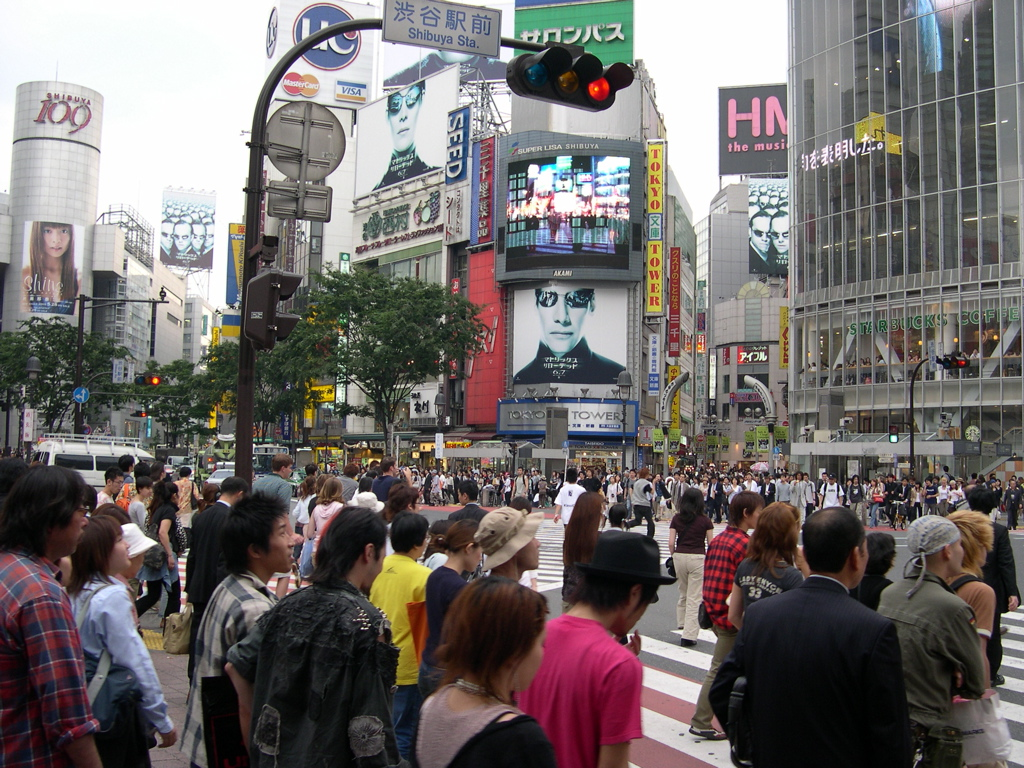
Social psychology studies the nature and causes of social behavior.

Social psychology is the study of social behavior and mental processes, with an emphasis on how humans think about each other and how they relate to each other. Social psychologists are especially interested in how people react to social situations. They study such topics as the influence of others on an individual's behavior (e.g. conformity, persuasion), and the formation of beliefs, attitudes, and stereotypes about other people. Social cognition fuses elements of social and cognitive psychology in order to understand how people process, remember, and distort social information. The study of group dynamics reveals information about the nature and potential optimization of leadership, communication, and other phenomena that emerge at least at the microsocial level. In recent years, many social psychologists have become increasingly interested in implicit measures, mediational models, and the interaction of both person and social variables in accounting for behavior.
