= Michael Kopelman =

British researcher (born 1950)

- Born: Michael David Kopelman; February 8, 1950 (age 76)
- Citizenship: United Kingdom
- Education: PhD, Institute of Psychiatry, Psychology and Neuroscience, King's College London (1988)
- Alma mater: University of London
- Awards: Distinguished Career Award from the International Neuropsychological Society (2013)

Michael David Kopelman (born February 8, 1950) is a British researcher of memory disorders, having contributed for more than 30 years to the development of cognitive neuropsychology and cognitive neuropsychiatry. Until his retirement in 2015, he was lead clinician at the Neuropsychiatry and Memory Disorders Clinic at St Thomas' National Health Service teaching hospital in Central London. Beginning in 1981, he also served as an expert witness in legal proceedings, including high-profile cases.

== Education ==
Kopelman's first degree was in psychology. He subsequently studied medicine at Middlesex University, and in 1978 completed his medical degree at the University of London. From 1980 to 1988, Kopelman trained in psychiatry at Bethlem-Maudsley Joint Hospitals. In 1988, he earned his PhD from the Institute of Psychiatry, Psychology and Neuroscience, King's College London.

== Research and career ==
Kopelman's research interests include neurological memory disorders, especially retrograde amnesia; confabulation; executive function; semantic dementia; and psychogenic amnesia, particularly the nature of amnesia for offences.

=== Academic career ===
From 1989 to 2015, Kopelman was first a consultant neuropsychiatrist, then professor of neuropsychiatry at Guy's, King's and St Thomas' School of Medicine. He is Emeritus Professor of Neuropsychiatry at the Institute of Psychiatry, Psychology and Neuroscience, King's College London.

=== Professional associations ===
In 2009, Kopelman was elected a Fellow of the Academy of Medical Sciences. He is also a member of the British Psychological Society and Royal College of Psychiatrists. He is past president of the following organizations.

- British Academy of Forensic Sciences
- British Neuropsychological Society (2004–2006)
- International Neuropsychiatric Association
- International Neuropsychoanalysis Society and
- International Neuropsychological Society

Kopelman is a founding member of both the Memory Disorders Research Society and the Society of Expert Witnesses.

=== Expert witness ===
Since 1981, Kopelman has served as an expert witness on neuropsychiatric and general psychiatric matters. He coauthored a Royal College of Psychiatrists report to the House of Lords before they declared detention orders unlawful in December 2004, and a confidential report to the governmental mediation hearings on Guantanamo returnees in 2010.

According to the British Journal of Psychology, Kopelman has often been involved in "headline-grabbing courtroom dramas." His participation in high-profile cases includes criminal court, Appeal Court, Special Immigration Appeals Commission, death row, and extradition proceedings.

In 2020, Kopelman served as a defence expert on behalf of WikiLeaks founder Julian Assange at his first extradition hearing. Delivering her verdict in January 2021, district judge Vanessa Baraitser ruled that Assange could not be extradited from the UK to the U.S. because of fragile mental health and risk of suicide. The judgment quoted Kopelman, who evaluated Assange in HM Prison Belmarsh in 2019 and 2020: "I am as confident as a psychiatrist ever can be that, if extradition to the United States were to become imminent, Mr. Assange will find a way of suiciding." During the hearing, prosecution lawyers questioned Kopelman's impartiality as an expert witness, asserting he had failed in his duty by deliberately concealing the information that, during his time at the Ecuadorian embassy, Assange had formed a long-term relationship with Stella Morris and fathered two children with her. However, in her ruling the judge did not accept that Kopelman failed in his duty. "Professor Kopelman's decision to conceal their relationship was misleading and inappropriate in the context of his obligations to the court," Baraitser wrote, "but an understandable human response to Ms. Morris's predicament." Baraitser accepted that the court was at no point actually misled, explaining that the court had become aware of the relationship in April 2020, before reading Kopelman’s report, or hearing evidence on the issue. The judge ordered Assange released.

Nevertheless, Assange remained in custody as the U.S. appealed to England's High Court of Justice, where in an August 2021 preliminary decision, Lord Justice Holroyde found that the district judge may have given too much weight to what Holroyde deemed "a misleading report" by Kopelman. Holroyde called it unusual for an appellate court to reassess expert witness evidence accepted by a lower court, but said it was arguable that the High Court might eventually reach a different conclusion, given that Kopelman had omitted to disclose what he knew about Assange's relationship with Stella Moris. The High Court was expected to convene a full hearing in October 2021.

=== Publications ===
Kopelman has authored nearly 200 scientific articles.

His books include:

- The Handbook of Memory Disorders (coeditor; 2002)
- Forensic Neuropsychology in Practice: A guide to assessment and legal processes (coeditor; 2009)
- Lishman's Organic Psychiatry: A Textbook of Neuropsychiatry, 4th Edition (coauthor; 2012)

=== Awards ===
Kopelman received the 2013 Distinguished Career Award from the International Neuropsychological Society for his contributions to neuropsychology. The commendation recognized his "human rights medico-legal work on behalf of detainees and Guantanamo returnees."
