= Developmental Neuropsychology (journal) =

Psychology journal

- Discipline: Developmental psychology Neuropsychology
- Language: English
- Edited by: Robert J. McCaffrey

Publication details
- History: 1985–present
- Publisher: Routledge
- Frequency: 8 issues/year
- Impact factor: 1.344 (2018)

Standard abbreviations
- ISO 4: Dev. Neuropsychol.

Indexing
- CODEN: DENEE8
- ISSN: 8756-5641 (print); 1532-6942 (web)

Links
- Journal homepage

Developmental Neuropsychology is a peer-reviewed scientific journal covering the intersection of developmental psychology and neuropsychology. It was established in 1985 and is published eight times per year by Routledge. The editor-in-chief is Robert J. McCaffrey (Albany Neuropsychological Associates). According to the Journal Citation Reports, the journal has a 2018 impact factor of 1.344.

== See also ==
- Developmental neuropsychology
