= Erin Bigler =

American psychologist

- Born: Erin David Bigler; July 9, 1949 (age 76)
- Education: Brigham Young University
- Known for: Neuroimaging research
- Awards: Karl G. Maeser Distinguished Faculty Lecturer Award from Brigham Young University (1999)
- Scientific career
- Fields: Neuropsychology
- Institutions: Brigham Young University
- Thesis: Modulation of Photically Evoked After-Discharges by Means of Pharmacological and Behavioral Arousal (1974)

Erin David Bigler (born July 9, 1949) is a retired American neuropsychologist and the Susa Young Gates Professor at Brigham Young University (BYU), where he was a professor of psychology and neuroscience. He is known for his neuroimaging research. He was president of the National Academy of Neuropsychology from 1989 to 1990 and of the International Neuropsychological Society from 2014 to 2015. He founded the Brain Imaging and Behavior Laboratory at BYU in 1990, and chaired the Psychology Department there from 1996 to 2002. He has been the first director of BYU's Magnetic Resonance Imaging Research Facility since 2013. He retired in 2018 from teaching at Brigham Young University in Utah.

He married Janet Beckstrom on June 22, 1971. Their children are Alicia Bigler Davis, born in 1976, and Erin Daniel Bigler, born in 1982.
