= Natalia Ojeda del Pozo =

Spanish neuropsychologist (born 1972)

- Born: 1972 (age 53–54); Bilbao, Spain
- Occupations: Clinical psychologist, neuropsychologist, university professor
- Known for: President of the International Neuropsychological Society (INS) (since 2023)
- Title: Full Professor of Neuropsychology (since 2017)
- Board member of: Royal Academy of Medicine of the Basque Country (since 2022); Hispano-American Academy of Doctors (since 2025)

Academic background
- Education: University of Deusto (B.Sc. Psychology); University of Oxford (Clinical training); Johns Hopkins Hospital (Postgraduate Neuropsychology & Neuroimaging)
- Alma mater: University of Deusto (Ph.D. Psychology, 2000)

Academic work
- Discipline: Clinical psychology, Neuropsychology
- Institutions: University of Deusto (since 1999)
- Main interests: neurodegenerative diseases, cognitive rehabilitation

Natalia Ojeda del Pozo (born 1972, in Bilbao) is a Spanish clinical psychologist, neuropsychologist, and university professor. She is the first scientist from Spain to serve as president of the International Neuropsychological Society (INS).

== Academic background and career ==
Ojeda del Pozo earned her degree in psychology from the University of Deusto (1990–1995). Between 1995 and 1997, she completed supervised clinical training at the University of Oxford and a postgraduate degree in Clinical Neuropsychology and Neuroimaging Techniques at Johns Hopkins Hospital. Since 1999, she has been involved in academic activities at the University of Deusto, where she received her doctorate in Psychology in 2000.

In 2017, she was appointed full professor of Neuropsychology at the University of Deusto, and has held various administrative positions at the university. She has directed research projects focused on neurodegenerative diseases and cognitive rehabilitation. She is the author of over one hundred scientific articles and approximately twenty books.

== Institutional roles and international activity ==
In 2023, Ojeda del Pozo was elected president of the International Neuropsychological Society (INS), becoming the first person from Spain to assume this responsibility.

Ojeda del Pozo is a full member of the Royal Academy of Medicine of the Basque Country and the Hispano-American Academy of Doctors. She is part of the Scientific Advisory Committee of the Federation of European Neuroscience Societies (EFNS) and the Expert Committee of the World Health Organization.

== Scientific contributions and outreach ==
Ojeda del Pozo is the author and promoter of the neuropsychological rehabilitation programs RehacoP and RehacoG, which have been recognized by the European Union as clinical best practices.

In addition to her research, she engages in public outreach activities, collaborating with media and participating in conferences and talks about mental health aimed at the general public. In 2025, she received the Radio Bilbao Award for Excellence in Research.

== Awards and recognitions (selection) ==
- 2nd International Prize for Quality and Scientific Relevance, 7th World Congress of Biological Psychiatry, Berlin (2001).
- 1st Prize for Best Scientific Communication, International Congress of the World Psychiatric Association, Madrid (2001).
- Amadeo Sánchez Blanqué Award to the best scientific communication on Clinical Research in Psychiatry, Spanish Society of Biological Psychiatry, Seville (2006).
- National Neuropsychology Award, Spanish Neuropsychology Consortium (2024).
- Radio Bilbao Award for Excellence in Research (2025).
- Psikologia Sariak Award, Official College of Psychologists of Bizkaia (2025).

== Published books (selection) ==
- Ojeda del Pozo, Natalia; et al. (2010). Neurocognición en esquizofrenia. Editorial Deusto. ISBN 9788498304817.
- Ojeda del Pozo, Natalia (2012). Manual del terapeuta REHACOP. Deusto. ISBN 9788461597345.
- Ojeda del Pozo, Natalia; et al. (2015). La predicción del diagnóstico de esquizofrenia. Editorial Médica. ISBN 9788498302424.
- Ojeda del Pozo, Natalia (2016). REHACOG: Programa de Rehabilitación Neuropsicológica en Gerontología. Deusto. ISBN 9788460884279.
- Ojeda del Pozo, Natalia (2018). Neuropsicología de la esquizofrenia. Sintesis. ISBN 9788491712398.
