= Brenda Rapp =

American cognitive neuroscientist

- Born: Brenda Carla Rapp
- Education: Johns Hopkins University
- Scientific career
- Fields: Cognitive neuroscience
- Workplaces: Department of Cognitive Neuroscience, Krieger School of Arts and Sciences, Johns Hopkins University
- Thesis: Sublexical orthographic structure in reading (1990)
- Doctoral advisor: Alfonso Caramazza Richard G. Schwartz
- Website: Official website

Brenda Carla Rapp professor and chair of the Department of Cognitive Neuroscience at Krieger School of Arts and Sciences, Johns Hopkins University. In 2010, she was appointed joint editor-in-chief of the journal Cognitive Neuropsychology.

== Early life and education ==
Rapp is originally from Madrid, Spain.

During the summer after completing high school, Rapp grew interested in helping children with learning and language disabilities. She pursued a Special Education degree at the University of Maryland.

Rapp gained her doctorate in psychology in 1990 from Johns Hopkins University. She has worked there since.

== Research and career ==
Rapp's main research interests are written word production (spelling) and dysgraphia (spelling problems).

Rapp has published over 150 papers in scientific journals, such as the Brain, Cognitive Neuropsychology and Frontiers in Psychology, and has been cited over 6,000 times. She has commented on her research findings in various media outlets, including The Guardian, CNN and the Baltimore Sun. She was awarded an honorary degree from UCLouvain on April 8th, 2025.

== Bibliography ==
Books

- Rapp, Brenda, ed. (2001). The handbook of cognitive neuropsychology: what deficits reveal about the human mind. Philadelphia, Pennsylvania: Psychology Press. ISBN 9780863775925.

Journals

- Rapp, Brenda; Beeson, Pelagie M. (June–July 2003). "Introduction: Dysgraphia: cognitive processes, remediation, and neural substrates". Aphasiology. 17 (6–7): 531–534. doi:10.1080/02687030344000012. S2CID 218638970. (Guest editors)
- Rapp, Brenda; Miozzo, Michele (2011). "Introduction to papers from the 5th Workshop on Language Production: The neural bases of language production". Language and Cognitive Processes. 26 (7): 869–877. doi:10.1080/01690965.2010.544595. S2CID 4802333. (Guest editors)
- Rapp, Brenda (2011). "Case series in cognitive neuropsychology: Promise, perils, and proper perspective". Cognitive Neuropsychology. 28 (7): 435–444. doi:10.1080/02643294.2012.697453. PMC 3427758. PMID 22746685.
