= Igor Grant =

American psychiatrist

Igor Grant (born March 26, 1942) is an American psychiatrist. He is Distinguished Professor in the Department of Psychiatry in the School of Medicine at the University of California, San Diego. He is Director of the HIV Neurobehavioral Research Program (HNRP) and the Center for Medicinal Cannabis Research (CMCR). Grant is the founding editor of the Journal of the International Neuropsychological Society and founding co-editor of the journal AIDS and Behavior. His work focuses on effects of HIV and drug use, particularly alcohol, medical marijuana, and methamphetamine.

== Early life ==
Grant was born in Shanghai China, spending the early years of his life in what was formerly known as the French Concession, attending primary school at the Ecole Ste Jeanne D'Arc. The Grants (Alexander. Antonina, and Igor) emigrated to Vancouver, Canada in 1951. Alexander, who became blind due to an accident in his teens, worked for the Canadian National Institute for the Blind, while Antonina worked in mail order sales at Sears, Roebuck. Grant attended Kitsilano High School Kitsilano Secondary School where he was active in student government and the United Nations club. In 1958 he became one of a group of students who travelled across Canada and the USA to visit the UN after winning public speaking competitions (Grant's speech was "Canada's Role in the UN").

== Career ==
After graduating from KHS in 1959 Grant attended the University of British Columbia, earning his doctor of medicine degree in 1966, and receiving several honors including the Frank Horner Medal for the Highest Standing in Medicine. He then went to the University of Pennsylvania. From 1966 to 1967 he did his internship at the Hospital of the University of Pennsylvania, then received his psychiatry training in the Department of Psychiatry at the University of Pennsylvania. He served as chief resident in psychiatry from 1970 to 1971, instructor in psychiatry from 1970 to 1972, and was staff psychiatrist for psychiatric inpatient service at the Hospital of the University of Pennsylvania from 1971 to 1972. In 1972, he began his affiliation with the University of California, San Diego and the VA San Diego Healthcare System. At UCSD Grant rose from assistant professor to full professor in 1982, distinguished professor in 2006 and Mary Gilman Marston Professor in Psychiatry in 2016. He served as chair of the UC San Diego Department of Psychiatry from 2014-2019. Grant also is adjunct professor in the Department of Psychology at San Diego State University. He was a visiting professor at the Institute of Neurology University of London for a year in both 1980 and 1987, and visiting professor of immunology at St. Mary's Hospital Medical School (now part of the Imperial College School of Medicine).

== Contributions to science ==
Grant's primary research has focused on the effects of diseases and substance abuse on brain and behavior. His work on alcoholism demonstrated that long-term abstinence was associated with normalization in neurocognitive functions and long-term survival. He led the Collaborative Neuropsychological Study of Polydrug Users in the 1970s, one of the earliest studies into the effects of multiple drug use on the brain. In the next decade he coordinated studies into the effects of hypoxemia, and oxygen treatment, on cognitive functions in people with COPD. He established the multidisciplinary and translational HIV Neurobehavioral Research Center (HNRC) in 1989. The HIV Neurobehavioral Research Program https://hnrp.hivresearch.ucsd.edu/index.php has contributed to understanding of how HIV can disrupt brain function, and how abuse of drugs such as methamphetamine can compound this injury. In 2000 he established the Center for Medicinal Cannabis Research https://www.cmcr.ucsd.edu, focused on potential uses, and limitations, of cannabinoids as medicines. Another theme in Grant's research focused on the effects of stress on health. He reported that stressful life events were associated with onset and worsening of symptoms of multiple sclerosis. Work on the stress experienced by elderly spousal caregivers of dementia patients explored how negative affect, sleep disturbance, and sympatho-adrenal-medullary arousal contributed to cardiovascular risk in care providers.

== Contributions to education ==
At the UCSD School of Medicine Grant coordinated the development of a multipart interdisciplinary core course in Social and Behavioral Sciences. He co-chaired a task force to establish a Joint Doctoral Program in Clinical Psychology, a unique collaboration between UCSD's School of Medicine Department of Psychiatry and SDSU's College of Sciences Department of Psychology. Grant has served as dissertation chair for over 20 PhD graduate students, many of whom have established independent academic careers. Grant received the Paul Satz International Neuropsychological Society Career Mentoring Award in 2016.

== Other professional activities ==
Grant was founding editor of the Journal of the International Neuropsychological Society. With Thomas Patterson, PhD. he co-founded the journal AIDS and Behavior. He has been a member of many scholarly societies. He was President of the International Neuropsychological Society from 2007-2008. Grant served on several NIH review groups, and on the National Advisory Councils of NIDA and the Office of AIDS Research. In his role as CMCR Director he has provided consultation to State and Federal governments, including testimony to House committees, FDA, California Legislature, and the Medical Board of California on various issues concerning medicinal cannabis.

== Recognitions ==
In 2007, he won the Distinguished Lifetime Contribution to Neuropsychology Award, and in 2013 the Nelson Butters Award for Research Contributions to Clinical Neuropsychology, both from the National Academy of Neuropsychology. In 2016 he received the Paul Satz International Neuropsychological Society Career Mentoring Award. In 2019 UC San Diego established the Dr. Igor and JoAnn Grant Chair in Psychiatry, an endowed chair to be held by future heads of the Department of Psychiatry.
