= APA Division of Clinical Neuropsychology =

The Division of Clinical Neuropsychology of the American Psychological Association is a scientific and professional organization of psychologists interested in neuropsychology and clinical neuropsychology, the study of brain-behavior relationships with a focus on applying this knowledge to human problems. The Division of Clinical Neuropsychology was established as a specialty organization within APA in 1980 and was formally recognized by APA in 1996 via the Committee for the Recognition of Specialties and Proficiencies in Professional Psychology". It has become one of APA's largest and most active divisions with over 4200 members worldwide. The Division of Clinical Neuropsychology has been instrumental in the development of clinical neuropsychology as a psychological specialty. This organization helped to establish policies and standards for practice and training in clinical neuropsychology as well as developed the definition of a clinical neuropsychologist, which has been used as a foundation by other neuropsychological organizations.

== History ==
APA Division 40 rose from the fields of medicine, study of individual variance, and clinical and physiological psychology. Its main goal is the study and practice of brain-behavior relationships. In the 1960s, professionals interested in training issues for the field of brain-behavior relationships formed the International Neuropsychological Society (INS) with 175 members in 1970. As it grew substantially, the APA formally established Division 40 (Clinical Neuropsychology) in 1980. One of its concerns was to establish standards for education and training in neuropscyhology. In the mid-1980s a joint task force of the INS and Division 40 published a report, the INS/40 guidelines, on training for clinical neuropsychologists. During this period, the number of PhD programs, pre-doctoral internships and post-doctoral fellowships grew around 50% in ten years. The INS/Division 40 task force on Education, Accreditation and Credentialing published a series of guidelines on training at the internship, graduate and postdoc levels. A later conference at Houston, Texas, where Division 40 was represented along with other neuropsychology-related organizations, produced the formal criteria for training and education in the field. Division 40 was one of the sponsoring organizations of the Houston conference.

Division 40 has evolved over time, forming four advisory committees on science, education, practice and public interest, mirroring the overall structure of the APA. It is one of the three largest divisions of the APA. The division had 636 members in 1981, 1785 members in 1985, 3880 in 1995, and 4348 in 1998. Currently it has around 5000 members, indicative of growth leveling off. As of 2000, the organization lacked cultural and gender diversity, with most members being white men, and in proportions atypical of other APA divisions. Only one Hispanic was a fellow of the division, and the number of those with Hispanic surnames was roughly just 1% of the total. A committee on ethnic minority affairs had made little difference.

== Collaborative work ==
APA Division 40 has teamed up with the American Speech Language Hearing Association (ASHA) and APA Division 22 to better evaluate and treat people with traumatic brain injury (TBI) by combining the efforts of speech pathologists, rehabilitation psychologists, and clinical neuropsychologists. This APA division has also petitioned the Commission for the Recognition of Specialties and Proficiencies in Professional Psychology (CRSPPP) to recognize clinical neuropsychology as a professional specialty focusing on the relationship of behavior to the brain, and applying this knowledge to solving human problems. The division has also come up with guidelines for psychometric support to administer and score standardized tests such as IQ tests, endorsed by the National Association of Psychometrists. Teaming up with the American Academy of Clinical Neuropsychology (AACN), APA Division 40 helped draft a model Local Coverage Determination (LCD) for deciding what practices Medicare would cover in the states of Wisconsin, Minnesota, Illinois and Michigan. The LCD allows neuropsychological assessment for diagnosing Alzheimer's disease, allowing feedback sessions, and using neuropsychological testing for diagnosing Mild Cognitive Impairments, previously detected through interviews alone.

Along with Division 20 and the committee on aging, Division 40 was involved in drafting APA's response to the first draft of National Framework for Alzheimer's disease (AD), a federal plan of action based on legislation passed in 2011 to reduce the burdens of AD. The response encouraged the federal government to allow delivery of care by multidisciplinary teams, and to extend Medicare to allow reimbursement for meetings with caregivers when the patient was not present. Along with the American Academy of Neuropsychology and Division 22, Division 40 endorsed the official position of the military TBI task force on the role of neuro and rehabilitation psychology in treating veterans with TBI. The division was involved in drafting a joint position statement, along with the AACN, American Board of Neuropsychology, and the National Academy of Neuropsychology, that neuropsychologists should be included among those authorized to evaluate, treat, and provide return-to-play clearance for athletes after a sport-related concussion.

The American Board of Clinical Neuropsychology, which is responsible for the examination for the diploma in Clinical Neuropsychology, follows the guidelines of Division 40 in determining who is competent to practice. Along with the National Academy of Neuropsychology, this division conducted a survey of those in the field in 2001 and reported the results in The Clinical Neuropsychologist and the Archives of Clinical Neuropsychology. The survey found patients were referred to neuropsychologists for differentiating between organic and psychogenic problems, and to oversee recovery of patients newly afflicted with conditions such as strokes. The neuropsychologists were reimbursed by managed care organizations (25%), forensic cases (19%), Medicare (17%) and self pay (16%). Men earned a median of $95,000 yearly and women $65,000. Those in private practice earned a median of $105,000 and average of $127,000, with no gender gap.

== Awards ==
APA Division 40 funds many awards and grants:

- A student Blue Ribbon Award for papers presented at APA's annual convention. Includes a $5000 prize.
- An award, with a $5000 prize, for the best student paper in Applied Neuropsychology presented at APA's annual convention.
- An award for the best student paper in Cognitive Neuroscience presented at APA's annual convention. Includes a $5000 prize.
- Two awards, $5000 each, for the best student papers from women and underrepresented minorities.
- Two $2,500 Benton-Meier Scholarships (along with the American Psychological Foundation) for graduate students who show great promise or achievement in scholarly or research activity.
