= Sandra Weintraub (psychologist) =

Alzheimer's researcher

- Citizenship: American
- Education: McGill University (BA); Boston University (MEd, PhD)
- Known for: Neuropsychology
- Scientific career
- Fields: Psychiatry; Neuropsychology
- Institutions: Northwestern University
- Thesis: Parents' speech to children: Some situational and sex differences (1978)

Sandra Weintraub is an American professor at Northwestern University and a researcher of Alzheimer's disease, memory disorders, and neuropsychology. Weintraub is involved with research to treat Alzheimer's disease and dementia. At Northwestern, Weintraub is a member of the Mesulam Center for Cognitive Neurology and Alzheimer’s Disease.

Weintraub's research has been cited more than 30,000 times according to Scopus.

Weintraub was President of the International Neuropsychological Society in 2012. In March 2023, Weintraub was appointed to an Illinois Supreme Court Commission on Elder Law.
