= Cognitive Neuropsychology (journal) =

- Discipline: Cognitive neuropsychology
- Language: English
- Edited by: Brenda Rapp; Bradford Z. Mahon

Publication details
- History: 1984–present
- Publisher: Taylor and Francis (United Kingdom)
- Frequency: 8/year

Standard abbreviations
- ISO 4: Cogn. Neuropsychol.

Indexing
- CODEN: COGNEP
- ISSN: 0264-3294 (print); 1464-0627 (web)
- LCCN: 2004206500
- OCLC no.: 949548313

Links
- Journal homepage; Online access; Online archive

Cognitive Neuropsychology is a peer-reviewed academic journal aimed at promoting the investigation of human cognition that is based on neuropsychological methods including brain pathology, recording, stimulation, brain imaging or the study of developmental deficits.

The journal is published eight times a year by Taylor and Francis and its joint editors-in-chief are Brenda Rapp (Johns Hopkins University) and Bradford Z. Mahon (University of Rochester).

The journal exhibited unusual levels of self-citation and its journal impact factor of 2019 was suspended from Journal Citation Reports in 2020, a sanction which hit 34 journals in total.

== Abstracting and indexing ==
The journal is abstracted and indexed in:

- Applied Social Science Index and Abstracts (ASSIA)
- Biosciences Information Service
- Child Development Abstracts and Bibliography (CDAB)
- Current Contents/Social & Behavioural Sciences
- EMBASE/Excerpta Medica
- European Reference Index for the Humanities (ERIH)
- Linguistics Abstracts
- Linguistics and Language Behavior Abstracts (LLBA)
- MEDLINE
- MLA International Bibliography
- Neuroscience Citation Index
- PsycINFO
- PubsHub
- Research Alerts
- SciSearch
- SCOPUS
- Social Sciences Citation Index
- Social SciSearch
- Social Services Abstracts
- Sociological Abstracts
- UnCover
