= The Clinical Neuropsychologist =

Medical journal

- Discipline: Clinical neuropsychology
- Language: English
- Edited by: Yana Suchy

Publication details
- Former name: Clinical Neuropsychologist
- History: 1987-present
- Publisher: Routledge
- Frequency: 8/year
- Impact factor: 2.7 (2024)

Standard abbreviations
- ISO 4: Clin. Neuropsychol.

Indexing
- CODEN: CLNEEC
- ISSN: 1385-4046 (print); 1744-4144 (web)
- OCLC no.: 16264653

Links
- Journal homepage; Online access; Online archive

The Clinical Neuropsychologist is a peer-reviewed medical journal covering clinical neuropsychology. It was founded in 1987 as Clinical Neuropsychologist, obtaining its current name in 1995. It is published eight times per year by Routledge on behalf of the American Academy of Clinical Neuropsychology, of which it is the official journal. The editor-in-chief is Yana Suchy (University of Utah). According to the Journal Citation Reports, the journal has a 2024 impact factor of 2.7.
