= Dirk Bakker =

South African politician

Member of the National Assembly
- In office May 1994 – April 2004
- Constituency: Gauteng

Personal details
- Citizenship: South Africa
- Party: New National Party; National Party

Dirk Michael Bakker is a South African politician and lawyer who represented the National Party (NP) and New National Party (NNP) in the National Assembly from 1994 to 2004, gaining election in 1994 and 1999. He served the Gauteng constituency. During his second term, he was also the NNP's national legal director, in which capacity he advised the NNP on its cooperation agreement with the governing African National Congress (ANC).
