= Cecil R. Reynolds =

American psychology professor (born 1952)

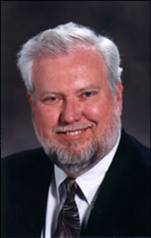
- Reynolds in 2008
- Born: Cecil Randy Reynolds; February 7, 1952 (age 74); Camp Lejeune, North Carolina, U.S.
- Education: University of North Carolina Wilmington (BA); University of Georgia (MEd, EdS, PhD)
- Scientific career
- Fields: Psychology
- Workplaces: Texas A&M University

Cecil Randy Reynolds (born February 7, 1952) is an American psychology professor best known for his work in psychological testing and assessment.

== Early life ==
Reynolds was born on February 7, 1952, at the US Naval Hospital in Camp Lejeune, North Carolina. His father, Cecil C. Reynolds, was a career marine, enlisting in 1929 and retiring in 1960. His mother, Daphne, owned and taught at a private preschool and kindergarten for 25 years, later becoming a published poet and author of children's books. Reynolds attended New Hanover High School, graduating in 1969, and turned down a Presidential appointment to the United States Naval Academy by Richard Nixon, after being drafted by the New York Mets. He played on various minor league teams within the Mets organization. He made three all-star teams in different leagues prior to a career-ending injury in spring training in 1974, the year of his first major league contract.

== Higher education ==
Reynolds then returned to his education, earning his B.A. in Psychology in 1975 from University of North Carolina at Wilmington. He then attended University of Georgia (UGA), earning a M.Ed. in Psychometrics in 1976, an Ed.S. in School Psychology in 1977, and a Ph.D. in Educational Psychology in 1978 while studying under Alan S. Kaufman and Ellis Paul Torrance (he was inducted into the UGA Hall of Fame for lifetime achievement in 2006). He completed his internship at the Medical College of Georgia, being mentored there by Lawrence Hartlage as his interests turned more staunchly to neuropsychology.

== Academic career ==
In summer of 1978 he took his first academic position at the University of Nebraska–Lincoln where he remained for three years and where he wrote the grants to obtain the Buros Institute, now known as the Buros Center for Testing, for the university, and became the first director of the Buros Institute after its founder, Oscar Krisen Buros (Reynolds was acting director during the search for a permanent new director in 1979–1980 and worked as associate director in 1980–1981) prior to being driven south to Texas A&M University (TAMU) by the bitter Nebraska winters. In 2006, he was named the Buros Institute Distinguished Reviewer of the Year. Reynolds taught courses primarily in the areas of psychological testing and diagnosis and in neuropsychology in addition to supervising clinical practica in testing and assessment. He remained at TAMU from summer of 1981, where he was a professor of educational psychology, a professor of neuroscience, and a distinguished research scholar, until his retirement from the university on July 31, 2008. In September 2008, he was honored by Texas A&M University's board of regents with the title of emeritus. He currently practices forensic neuroscience in Austin Texas and continues to work in test development.

Reynolds holds a diplomate in clinical neuropsychology from the American Board of Professional Neuropsychology, of which he is also a past president, a diplomate in pediatric neuropsychology from the American Board of Pediatric Neuropsychology, of which he is also a past president, and was a diplomate in school psychology of the American Board of Professional Psychology, prior to retiring his diplomate in 2004. He is a past president of the National Academy of Neuropsychology, APA Division 5 (Evaluation, Measurement, and Statistics), APA Division 40 (Clinical Neuropsychology), and APA Div. 16 (School Psychology). He is a Fellow of APA Divisions 1, 5, 15, 16, 40, and 53. He maintained a clinical practice for more than 25 years, primarily treating children who had been sexually assaulted as well as individuals with traumatic brain injury. His current consulting work is restricted to his forensic neuroscience practice.

== Professional honors ==
The American Psychological Association (APA) honored him with Early Career Awards from the Division of Educational Psychology and separately from the Division of Evaluation, Measurement, and Statistics. He received the Lightner Witmer Award from the APA's Division of School Psychology as the outstanding young school psychologist in the association as well. In 1999, he received the APA Division of School Psychology's Senior Scientist Award. He is past-president of three APA divisions, School Psychology (16), Clinical Neuropsychology (40), and Evaluation, Measurement, and Statistics (5). He was editor-in-chief of the APA journal Psychological Assessment with a 6-year term, beginning January 1, 2009. He was editor-in-chief of Applied Neuropsychology, from 2004 to 2008, and serves (or has served) on the editorial boards of 16 scientific journals. He served 12 years as editor and editor-elect of the Archives of Clinical Neuropsychology, the official journal of the National Academy of Neuropsychology. Reynolds has served as associate editor of the Journal of Special Education, School Psychology Quarterly, and currently is an associate editor of the American Psychological Association's open journal, Archives of Scientific Psychology. He is a past-president of the National Academy of Neuropsychology as well and has received the academy's Distinguished Clinical Neuropsychologist Award, the Distinguished Service Award, and the president's gold medal for service to the academy. In 1987, the American Library Association declared his Encyclopedia of Special Education to be one of the top 25 reference works published in all fields that year. He received the 50th Anniversary Razor Walker Award from the University of North Carolina at Wilmington for his service to the youth of America. He has been named a Distinguished Alumnus of the Year by both of his alma maters, the University of North Carolina at Wilmington and the University of Georgia, the latter also electing him to their academic Hall of Fame. In 2002 he served as a distinguished visiting professor at Wilford Hall, the USAF showcase hospital and training facility at Lackland AF Base in San Antonio, Texas, where he also conducted grand rounds. Reynolds also conducted grand rounds at the Mayo Clinic in Rochester, MN on the issue of diagnosing learning disorders, and has served as an invited discussant at pediatric grand rounds on several occasions at the annual meeting of the National Academy of Neuropsychology. He has received multiple other national awards for research accomplishments and service as well, including, in 2010, the American Psychological Association's Division of School Psychology Jack I. Bardon Award for a Lifetime of Distinguished Service. In 2011 he was elected a Distinguished Fellow of the National Academies of Practice. In 2017 he received the American Psychological Association's Nadine Murphy Lambert Award, which is given sparingly every 2–4 years to individuals based upon the unusual breadth and depth of their contributions to the field.

== Scientific writings and impact on psychology ==
His early work, principally in the 1980s, on empirical evaluation of the cultural test bias hypothesis in clinical assessment was not only prolific but at the cutting edge of psychological science at the time and led to resolution of many of the polemic debates over the use of clinical assessment devices with native born American ethnic minorities and moved the remaining arguments from emotion to reasoned scientific dialogue (see for example his 1983, Journal of Special Education paper, “Test bias: In God we trust, all others must have data”). At the same time, he was establishing important research programs in the areas of assessment of anxiety in children and youth and tackling the measurement issues surrounding the field of learning disabilities. The extent of his contributions to psychological science in these areas is easily seen by the fact that, remarkably, two of his papers have been noted as the most cited papers published in the history of their respective journals: his 1978 paper on assessing anxiety published in the Journal of Abnormal Child Psychology, and his 1984 paper describing and resolving many of the critical measurement issues in assessment of learning disabilities appearing in the Journal of Special Education. His subsequent work in the development of interpretive methods for clinical assessment instruments and debunking of the myths of profile analysis of intelligence test performance resulted in abandonment of unsubstantiated but prevalent clinical practices and in substantial changes in how such tests are interpreted today (for example see his 2003 paper with Livingston in Archives of Clinical Neuropsychology and his opening paper of the 2007 special issue of Applied Neuropsychology, which he edited, on this topic), as well as having influenced test development practices. For additional examples see his 1997 paper on assessment of forward and backward memory span, and his two 2000 papers in School Psychology Quarterly on configural frequency analysis and modal profile analysis. His work continues to influence many other researchers, and, since 1985, there have been only 2 issues of the bimonthly Journal of Clinical Child and Adolescent Psychology in which his work has not been referenced in one or more research articles.

He is currently the author of 37 commercially published psychological tests, several of which have profoundly altered the practice of clinical assessment of child and adolescent behavioral and emotional disorders, but also have provided researchers in the field with much needed objective measures of behavior to the improvement of research in childhood psychopathology generally. His Behavior Assessment System for Children, for example, is the most frequently used measure of child and adolescent behavior in the English-speaking world, and its Spanish redevelopment is widely used throughout Spain and South America in both research and practice.

Reynolds' test manuals have notably influenced how such manuals are now written and developed. His 2003 Reynolds Intellectual Assessment Scales Professional Manual, for example, was the first intelligence test manual to incorporate the 1999 conceptualization of validity in the Standards for Educational and Psychological Testing, a conceptualization largely derived from the work and careful thought of Sam Messick. His 2002 manual for the Comprehensive Trailmaking Test accomplished the same feat for the area of neuropsychological testing. His 3 measurement textbooks also were the first to explain and promote this modern conceptualization of validity as well.

As a journal editor for more than 23 years across 4 major journals (Archives of Clinical Neuropsychology, official journal of the National Academy of Neuropsychology-11 years; Applied Neuropsychology, official journal of the American Board of Professional Neuropsychology-5 years; the APA journal Psychological Assessment-5 years; and later as editor of the APA journal, Archives of Scientific Psychology, the association's now ended open access journal ), he has exerted a strong, positive influence on research in many areas of clinical assessment and testing. Each of these journals experienced a rise in their impact factor during his tenure as editor, but more importantly he implemented standards for assessment research that emphasized empirical work and replicability and raised reporting requirements for assessment work to new highs.

In 1994, he was one of 52 signatories on Mainstream Science on Intelligence, an editorial written by Linda Gottfredson and published in The Wall Street Journal, which presented a scientific consensus regarding (then) current findings on intelligence to assist in clarifying and differentiating mainstream consensus findings on the issue from some of the more scientifically controversial statements in Herrnstein and Murray's volume, The Bell Curve (in which he was miscited as "Cyril" Reynolds).

== Works (selection) ==
- Reynolds, C.R., & Richmond, B.O. (1978). What I Think and Feel: A revised measure of children's manifest anxiety. Journal of Abnormal Child Psychology, 6(2), 271–280.
- Reynolds, C.R. (1984). Critical measurement issues in assessment of learning disabilities. Journal of Special Education, 18, 451–476.
- Reynolds, C.R. (1983). Test bias: In God we trust, all others must have data. Journal of Special Education, 17(3), 214–268.
