= Journal of Clinical and Experimental Neuropsychology =

- Discipline: Neuropsychology
- Language: English
- Edited by: Lisa Rapport

Publication details
- Former name: Journal of Clinical Neuropsychology
- History: 1979-present
- Publisher: Routledge
- Frequency: 10/year
- Impact factor: 2.475 (2020)

Standard abbreviations
- ISO 4: J. Clin. Exp. Neuropsychol.

Indexing
- CODEN: JCENE8
- ISSN: 1380-3395 (print); 1744-411X (web)
- LCCN: 2006233308
- OCLC no.: 1033573692

Links
- Journal homepage; Online access; Online archive

The Journal of Clinical and Experimental Neuropsychology is a peer-reviewed scientific journal covering research in clinical and experimental neuropsychology. It was established in 1979 as the Journal of Clinical Neuropsychology, obtaining its current name in 1985. It is published ten times per year by Routledge and the editors-in-chief are Lisa Rapport (Wayne State University) and Julie Suhr (Ohio University). According to the Journal Citation Reports, the journal has a 2017 impact factor of 1.853.
