= Developmental neuropsychology =

Developmental neuropsychology combines the fields of neuroscience and developmental psychology, while drawing from various other related disciplines. It examines the relationship of behavior and brain function throughout the course of an individual's lifespan, though often emphasis is put on childhood and adolescence when the majority of brain development occurs. Research tends to focus on development of important behavioral functions like perception, language, and other cognitive processes. Studies in this field are often centered around children or other individuals with developmental disorders or various kinds of brain related trauma or injury. A key concept of this field is that looks at and attempts to relate the psychological aspects of development, such as behavior, comprehension, cognition, etc., to the specific neural structures; it draws parallels between behavior and mechanism in the brain. Research in this field involves various cognitive tasks and tests as well as neuroimaging. Some of the many conditions studied by developmental neuropsychologists include congenital or acquired brain damage, autism spectrum disorder, attention deficit disorder, executive dysfunction, seizures, intellectual disabilities, obsessive compulsive disorder, stuttering, schizophrenia, developmental aphasia, and other learning delays such as dyslexia, dysgraphia, and dyspraxia.

== History ==
Alexander Luria is considered by some to be a founding father of the field of neuropsychology. Luria's work, much of which was related to speech rehabilitation, provided much of the foundation for what we know today as child neuropsychology (developmental neuropsychology focusing only on beginning of lifespan). The Luria-Nebraska Neuropsychological Battery, a standardized test of neuropsychological functioning, was created based on his ideas. Lev Vygotsky, a student of Luria, also made significant contributions to child neuropsychology. Together, their methods have developed the basis for what is known as the Vygotsky-Luria approach. This approach is characterized by the idea that "higher psychological functions are characterized by three main features: (1) social genesis; (2) system structure; and (3) dynamic organization and localization" and examines the neural organization and function structure behind these higher mental functions.

Over time, completion of education to at least the high school level has become increasingly common as more and more jobs require skills such as reading and writing. As pressure to have children complete their schooling increases, so has the pressure to provide adequate education to all children. This has led to laws whose aim is to ensure education for disabled students. In order to accomplish this, research focus began to shift from adults who were skilled or struggled to read and write to the developmental processes behind them.

== Subfields ==
Research in developmental neuropsychology can generally be divided into two categories that are based on two main goals of the field: educational and clinical. The educational approach aims to understand and aid in the education of developing children (or in some cases adults) whom have deficits learning certain skills, most commonly language related – reading and writing. While some studies do focus on children with brain damage, a lot can be learned from children without brain damage who struggle to learn specific skills and/or have learning disabilities. The goal of this research is to understand the neural causes of these problems and how they relate to the psychological aspects of it in order to improve education programs and treatments. The clinical approach has a greater focus on pathology and medical treatments and diagnoses. Often these studies evaluate and describe a patient's neural damage due to injury, brain tumors, seizures, or various congenital disorders. This type of research typically examines loss of certain functions due to damage and assesses to what extent if any can patients, usually children with still developing brains, can regain these functions. The objective of a neuropsychological evaluation is to have a comprehensive view of a child's overall functioning, including how their brain operates, their strengths and limitations, their preferred learning style, and any potential abnormalities. This process is essential in the evaluation for the medical provider.
