= Psychological Assessment (journal) =

- Discipline: Clinical psychology
- Language: English
- Edited by: Julie A. Suhr

Publication details
- History: 1989-present
- Publisher: American Psychological Association (United States)
- Frequency: Quarterly
- Impact factor: 3.3 (2024)

Standard abbreviations
- ISO 4: Psychol. Assess.

Indexing
- ISSN: 1040-3590 (print); 1939-134X (web)

Links
- Journal homepage; Online access

Psychological Assessment is a peer-reviewed academic journal published by the American Psychological Association. It was established in 1989 and covers research in clinical psychology. The current editor-in-chief is Julie A. Suhr (Ohio University).

The journal has implemented the Transparency and Openness Promotion (TOP) Guidelines. The TOP Guidelines provide structure to research planning and reporting and aim to make research more transparent, accessible, and reproducible.

== Abstracting and indexing ==
The journal is abstracted and indexed by MEDLINE/PubMed and the Social Sciences Citation Index. According to the Journal Citation Reports, the journal has a 2024 impact factor of 3.3.
