= Distinguished Career Award =

A Distinguished Career Award is an award recognizing individuals for notable contributions to their fields, companies, or organizations. Distinguished Career Awards are typically bestowed on recipients later in their careers, as opposed to Early Career Awards, which recognize contributions towards the beginning of an individual's career.

== See also ==
- American Public Health Association Awards (Distinguished Career Award)
- American Sociological Association Awards
- Awards and decorations of the United States government
- Distinguished Career Intelligence Medal
