= Neurocase =

- Discipline: Neuroscience
- Language: English

Publication details
- History: 1995–present
- Publisher: Taylor and Francis (United Kingdom)
- Frequency: Bimonthly

Standard abbreviations
- ISO 4: Neurocase

Indexing
- ISSN: 1355-4794 (print); 1465-3656 (web)
- LCCN: 2007233446
- OCLC no.: 290641801

Links
- Journal homepage; Online access; Online archive

Neurocase is a peer-reviewed journal specializing in case studies in the neuropsychology, neuropsychiatry and behavioral neurology of adults and children. The publisher also maintains a database of all patients from the various studies and articles for reference by Neurocase subscribers. The journal is published bi-monthly by Psychology Press, which also maintains on-line access to articles for subscribers.
