= Journal of the International Neuropsychological Society =

- Discipline: Neuropsychology
- Language: English
- Edited by: John L. Woodard (2023 - Current)

Publication details
- History: January 1995–present
- Publisher: Cambridge University Press
- Frequency: Bimonthly
- Impact factor: 2.6 (2024)

Standard abbreviations
- ISO 4: J. Int. Neuropsychol. Soc.

Indexing
- CODEN: JINSF9
- ISSN: 1355-6177 (print); 1469-7661 (web)

Links
- Journal homepage; Online access; Online archive

The Journal of the International Neuropsychological Society is a bimonthly peer-reviewed scientific journal covering neuropsychology. It is the official journal of the International Neuropsychological Society, on whose behalf it is published by Cambridge University Press. The editor-in-chief is John L. Woodard (Wayne State University). According to the Journal Citation Reports, the journal has a 2024 impact factor of 2.6, ranking it 122nd out of 288 journals in the category "Psychiatry", 138th out of 286 journals in the category "Clinical Neurology", and 187th out of 314 journals in the category "Neurosciences".

.
