= Kenneth Heilman =

American neurologist (1938–2024)

- Born: June 2, 1938; Brooklyn, New York, U.S.
- Died: July 15, 2024 (aged 86)
- Education: Cornell University; University of Virginia
- Scientific career
- Fields: Behavioral neurology
- Workplaces: University of Florida

Kenneth M. Heilman (June 2, 1938 – July 15, 2024) was an American behavioral neurologist. He is considered one of the fathers of modern-day behavioral neurology.

== Background ==
Heilman was born on June 2, 1938, in Brooklyn, New York, where he was also raised. He attended college at the University of Virginia was accepted into medical school after three years of college and graduated from the University of Virginia School of Medicine in 1963.

He did two years of residency in internal medicine at Cornell University Medical Center at Bellevue Hospital. During the Vietnam War, he joined the Air Force and served as chief of medicine at the NATO Hospital in İzmir, Turkey from 1965 to 1967. After leaving the Air Force, Heilman entered a residency in neurology at Harvard Medical School under Derek Denny-Brown and then continued there being a fellowship with Norman Geschwind and D. Pandya.

Upon completion of his fellowship, Heilman was recruited by the Dr. Melvin Greer, the chair of the Department of Neurology, at the University of Florida. Heilman joined the faculty of the University of Florida Department of Neurology in 1970 as an assistant professor. He was promoted to associate professor in 1973 and professor in 1975. He became the first James E. Rooks, Jr. Professor of Neurology in 1990, a newly endowed chair at the university. In 1998, he was among the first UF faculty to receive the title of distinguished professor. Heilman was also the program director and was chief of neurology at the North Florida/South Georgia Veterans Administration Hospital (Malcom Randall VAMC).

Heilman died on July 15, 2024, at the age of 86.

== Clinical activity ==
Heilman was an active clinician who was director of the Memory Disorders Clinic at UF/Shands, one of the 15 Memory Disorder Clinics supported by the Florida Department of Elder Affairs. This clinic serves those with memory and cognitive disorders, especially those suffering from dementias such as Alzheimer's disease. His expertise as a clinician has been recognized by being listed in virtually every edition of the Best Doctors in America as well as other publications citing clinical excellence.

== Research and teaching ==
Heilman's research was interested in attentional, emotional and cognitive disorders. In addition to teaching medical and psychology students, he was active in resident education and was the director of the University of Florida Behavioral Neurology Fellowship that trained many post doctoral fellows since its inception in 1976. Several of Heilman's former fellows are now leaders in academic neurology, neuropsychology, speech therapy, and other allied fields. Heilman is the author and editor for about 22 books and has also authored or co-authored more than 670 articles in peer-reviewed journals, as well as more than 110 chapters. His research has been funded by federal agencies (e.g., VA Merit Review and/or National Institutes of Health) for more than three decades. He also was a visiting professor more than 50 times.

In recognition of his research contributions, he was in the first group of individuals to receive the University of Florida Research Foundation Professorships. Heilman also received the Clinical Research Award from the University of Florida College of Medicine. The Behavioral and Cognitive Neurology Society has recognized him with an Outstanding Achievement Award for his research and educational contributions to neurology. He received the Wartenberg Award from the American Academy of Neurology (AAN). He was honorary member of the American Neurological Association and an AAN fellow. He was on the editorial boards of nine journals.

One of Heilman's books, on the neurology of creativity, is dedicated to the nearly 100 fellows he has had who have published with him.

=== Academic leadership ===
He is the author/editor of 22 books, more than 115 chapters and 670 journal publications, with more than 60,000 citations (i-index 115). He and his coworkers have described several new diseases/disorders and their treatment such as orthostatic tremor. Along with his co-investigators, he had helped to understand the pathophysiology of many neurobehavioral disorders such as spatial neglect, apraxia, disorders of emotional communication, aphasia and amnestic disorders. He was a past President and received a Distinguished Career Awards from the International Neuropsychology Society (INS) and the Society for Cognitive and Behavioral Neurology. He was an Honorary Member of the American Neurological Association. He was also a Fellow in the American Academy of Neurology (AAN) and received the Wartenberg Keynote Lecturer Award from the AAN. The AAN had a program (2019) called “Standing on the Shoulders of Giants.” This program highlighted, “The five Neuro Giants who will take us on their personal journey in neurology and how they have contributed to the evolution of neurology.” Dr. Heilman was one of the "Giants." In 2019, he was awarded the “Distinguished Lifetime Contribution to Neuropsychology” award by the National Academy of Neuropsychology (NAN).

== Research advances ==
Research advances reported by Heilman and co-workers demonstrated:

- A cortico-limbic-reticular network mediates attention.
- In most people, the right hemisphere is dominant for attending to both sides of space and the left hemisphere to right hemispace (see hemispatial neglect).
- In most people, it was the right hemisphere of the brain that was important for emotional communication, including speech prosody and emotional facial expressions.
- Skilled movement (praxis), such as tool use, in most right handed people, is controlled by a left hemispheric modular network where the parietal lobe contains the representations of the spatial trajectories for these skilled movements, and the frontal lobe transforms this into motor codes.
- The right hemisphere's parietal lobe is important in the control of the autonomic nervous system.
- First to describe orthostatic tremor.

== Author and editor ==
Books written or edited by Kenneth Heilman: 22. Heilman K.M. Brain Laterality: Right, Up and Forward- In Press. Routledge—Taylor & Francis,. In Press. 21. Heilman K.M and Nadeau S.E. Handbook of Clinical Neurology: Disorders of Emotion in Neurologic Disease, Volume 183, 2021. 20. Libon D.J., Swenson R., Lamar M. & Heilman K.M. Vascular Disease, Alzheimer ’s Disease and Mild Cognitive Impairment: Advancing an Integrated Approach. Oxford University Press. 2020. 19. Heilman K.M. and Nadeau S.E. The Aging Brain and Cognition. Cambridge University, 2020. 18. Heilman K.M. The Athlete’s Brain. Routlage Press. 2018 17. Heilman K.M., Wilson B.K., Wilson A., Wilson E.D., Wilson J.B. Brain Building Games. Bloomington, IN. Xlibris US, 2018. 16. Minagar A, Finney GR, Heilman KM. Neurobehavioral Manifestations of Neurological Diseases: Diagnosis and Treatment. Neurologic Clinics. Volume 34, February 2016. 15. Heilman K.M. and Donda R. The Believer’s Brain: Home to the Spiritual and Religious Mind Psychology Press, 2014.

14. Heilman K.M. and Valenstein E. (Editors) Clinical Neuropsychology, 5TH Edition, New York, Oxford University Press, 2012. 13. Heilman K.M. PGY1: Lessons in Caring. New York, Oxford University Press, 2009. 12. Noseworthy JH (Editor-in Chief); Biller J, Cairncross J G, Dyck P, Edmeads J, Engel A., Fahn S, Ford B, Hartung HP, Heilman KM, Roos KL, Morell M, Samuels MA, Sharpe J, Snyder R, Wijdicks E, (Section Editors); Neurological Therapeutics : Principles and Practice (Second Edition) Matin Dunitz, Taylor and Francis Books, New York, 2006. 11. Heilman K.M. Creativity and the Brain. Psychology Press; Division of Taylor and Frances Books, New York, 2005. 10. Heilman, K.M. and Valenstein E. (Eds): Clinical Neuropsychology, Fourth Edition, Oxford University Press, New York, 2003. 9. Noseworthy J.H. (Editor-in Chief); Biller J, Cairncross J G, Dyck P, Edmeads J, Engel A., Fahn S, Ford B, Hartung HP, Heilman KM, Roos KL, Morell M, Samuels MA, Sharpe J, Snyder R, Wijdicks E, (Section Editors); Neurological Therapeutics: Principles and Practice, Matin Dunitz, Taylor and Francis Books, New York, 2003. 8. Heilman, K.M., The Matter of Mind: A Neurologist’s View of Brain Behavior Relationships. Oxford University Press, New York, 2002. 7. Rothi, L.J.G. and Heilman, K.M., (Eds): Apraxia, Taylor & Francis London UK, 1997. 6. Heilman, K.M., Doty, L., Stewart, J.T., Bowers, D., Rothi, L.J.G. Helping People with Memory Disorders: A Guide for You and Your Family. Gainesville, Florida, 1996, 1999. 5. Heilman, K.M., and Valenstein, E., (Eds): Clinical Neuropsychology, Third Edition. Oxford University Press, 1993. 4. Heilman, K.M., and Valenstein, E., (Eds.): Clinical Neuropsychology, Second Edition. Oxford University Press, 1985. 3. Heilman, K.M., and Satz, P., (Eds.): Neuropsychology of Human Emotion. Guilford Press, New York, 1983. 2. Heilman, K.M., and Valenstein, E., (Eds.): Clinical Neuropsychology. Oxford University Press, New York, 1979. 1. Heilman, K.M., Watson, R.T., and Greer, M.: The Differential Diagnosis of Neurological Diseases. Appleton-Century-Croft, New York, 1977.
