= Joseph Claude Sinel =

New Zealand-born American industrial designer

Joseph Claude Sinel FIDSA
- In New York: The re-designed Sinel, 1936
- Born: 27 September 1889; Auckland, New Zealand
- Died: 27 January 1975 (aged 85); Alameda, California, United States
- Resting place: Kerikeri, Northland, New Zealand
- Citizenship: United States, 1945–
- Education: Auckland Technical College
- Occupation: Industrial designer
- Notable work: Product: Remington typewriter; International Ticket Scale Corporation weighing scale; Dictograph Acousticon Model 28; Davis–Hardoll gasoline dispenser; Folmer Graflex studio camera and stand; Dietz Streamline Monarch, Little Wizard and D-Lite lanterns; Toastmaster 1B6 automatic toaster; Marchant calculator Figuremaster; Interiors: Offices: International Ticket Scale Corp.; Exhibition: Australia pavilion, 1939–40 Golden Gate International Expo; Southern Pacific Railroad exhibit, 1939–40 Golden Gate International Expo
- Spouse: Genevieve Blue (m. 1926)
- Relatives: Joseph Sinel (great-uncle)

Joseph Claude Sinel (27 September 1889 – 27 January 1975) also known as Jo Sinel or "Auckland Jo", was a pioneering New-Zealand-born American industrial designer. Referred to in his lifetime and since as the father of American industrial design, he established what many regarded as the country's first industrial design practice.

== Early life and education ==
Sinel was born in Auckland, New Zealand, son of Thomas Edwin Sinel (1861–1928) and Eliza Janice Motion (1856–1926); one of some eleven siblings. His father, born at Saint Helier, Jersey, was then working as Tally Clerk at Queen Street wharf, progressing to prominence on the waterfront as the representative of various overseas shipping companies.

Sinel once said it was Thomas Umfrey Wells, headmaster of Richmond Road School and exceptional educator, who advised him to become an "artist". After leaving school in about 1904, he set out on that path with work in the art department of Wilson & Horton, lithographers and publishers of The New Zealand Herald, for some five years, as well as training through the art and design course at Auckland Technical College. There, without any definite thoughts on design at that point, he studied under the British industrial artist, Harry Wallace, who'd emigrated from England to take up appointment as an instructor at the college in 1904. Wallace had designed mass-production pottery, worked on staff at the Wedgwood Institute, Staffordshire, and exhibited at the Royal Academy of Arts. At college, examinations in science and art were carried out in connection with the Board of Education, South Kensington, London, (South Kensington system) through which Sinel gained first-class passes in drawing in 1908 and 1909, and in design in 1910. It is also commonly understood that he attended Elam School of Art.

== Career ==
After Wilson & Horton, Sinel freelanced in Wellington and Christchurch, then upon returning to Auckland, established a "commercial art and design" practice in Shortland Street. A split in the Auckland Society of Arts at the September 1911 meeting induced a few members, including Sinel, to resign and form the new Auckland Arts and Crafts Club in May 1912, where he exhibited work at their first annual exhibition held at the Auckland Society of Arts' gallery that year. A surviving presentation drawing depicting his design for a hand-cranked Auckland street directory is thought to be from this period.

=== Travels ===
Sinel appears to have left Auckland on the SS Maheno for Sydney, Australia, in January 1914, where he took to a life of subsistence as a sheep shearer, harvest-hand and rabbitter. Following the outbreak of World War I, he left Australia for Britain, from Sydney employed as a trimmer on the SS Rimutaka on 5 January 1915, to Liverpool on 8 March 1915. Walking through England and Scotland, he worked as a designer of printed tin box forms for Hudson Scott & Sons of Carlisle, and as a commercial artist for the highly regarded London commercial artists and advertising agencies, Carlton Studios and Charles F. Higham Limited. Higham's clients included Goodrich Tires, His Master's Voice and the British government. Though six of his brothers had enlisted in the Samoa Expeditionary Force and New Zealand Expeditionary Force, Wilfred Sinel DSO attaining the rank of Lieutenant Colonel, his own attempt to enlist in Kitchener's Army was unsuccessful. Instead, he served part of the war as an able seaman in the British Mercantile Marine.

Back in New Zealand and Australia, Sinel worked as an art director and commercial artist mostly on campaigns promoting American products until, on 24 August 1918, he shipped out of Sydney on RMS Niagara for Vancouver, touched at Seattle and, amidst the Spanish influenza pandemic and its precautions, entered the United States at San Francisco. He'd visited San Francisco before.

=== United States ===
Harold von Schmidt took him on staff at the advertising firm of Foster & Kleiser, creating posters and billboard advertising then booming to fill any vacant space in town, and working alongside the notable artists and designers von Schmidt, Maynard Dixon, Maurice Del Mue, Roi Partridge, Charles Stafford Duncan, Judson Starr and Otis Shepard. When von Schmidt left Foster & Kleiser, Sinel left too, and along with Maynard Dixon, David Hendrickson, Judson Starr, set up Advertising Illustrators, an independent group producing art for the various San Francisco advertising agencies, including Foster and Kleiser. The group did well for four years.

At some point, Sinel, along with Del Mue, took time-out to explore the Sierra Nevada mountains, where he built a log cabin at Susie Lake, then, as winter closed in, returned to San Francisco and several job offers.

In 1919, he was appointed as head of the art department at First National Pictures in New York. With the firm's publicity department in mid-June 1920, and having fitted out an automobile painted with graphics advertising the company's movies on the sides, he and Matthew Singer set off on a tour for a greater part of the year, traveling across the United States from Broadway and 42nd Street to the Truckee woodlands, California, promoting, in a semi-official capacity, the firm's sub-franchising plan.

Returned to San Francisco he was employed on lettering by the advertising agency H. K. McCann Company, taught design and lettering at the California School of Arts and Crafts for Frederick Meyer in 1921–1922, produced book illustrations and designs for the San Francisco publishers Edwin and Robert Grabhorn, the Grabhorn Press, established in 1920, then, for some five weeks, was an art director for Charles Corbett Ronalds, who'd established Ronalds Press and Advertising Agency Limited in Montreal, Canada, in 1918–19.

Sinel moved on to New York City in about 1923, where he started his own industrial design company. In 1936, he returned to the San Francisco Bay Area where he taught industrial design at the Rudolph Schaeffer School of Design.

Sinel claimed to have designed everything from "ads to andirons and automobiles, from beer bottles to book covers, from hammers to hearing aids, from labels and letterheads to packages and pickle jars, from textiles and telephone books to toasters, typewriters and trucks". Although he is perhaps best remembered for his designs of industrial scales, typewriters, and calculators, he also designed trademarks for businesses such as the Art Institute of Chicago, created book jackets for Doubleday, Knopf, and Random House, and for many years designed publications for Mills College. He taught design in a number of schools in the United States, and in 1955 became one of the fourteen founders of the American Society of Industrial Designers (which later merged with other organizations to form the Industrial Designers Society of America).

Sinel is sometimes said to have coined the term "industrial design" around the 1920s in the USA, though he first applied it there in relation to his professional work in 1919. Sinel denied the paternity of this term in an interview in 1969.

"... that's the same time [1920] that I was injecting myself into the industrial design field, of which it's claimed (and I'm in several of the books where they claim) that I was the first one, and they even say that I invented the name. I'm sure I didn't do that. I don't know where it originated and I don't know where I got hold of it".

The term was in use in by engineers, designers and artists in industrial nations in the 1840s. Florence Elizabeth Cory had founded the Original School of Industrial Design for Women in New York City in 1881. In 1891, American industrial designers were amongst others petitioning Secretary of the Treasury Foster to remove an embargo on foreign art, photographic and musical publications. The US Patent Office's first use of the term "industrial designer" appeared in 1913 as a synonym for "art in industry".

== Design gallery ==
=== Covers ===
Radio, February 1923

A Book of American Trade-marks & Devices, 1924

The Colophon: A Book Collectors' Quarterly, May 1930

Advertising Arts, March 1933

Decorative Arts catalog, Golden Gate International Exposition, 1939

=== Product ===
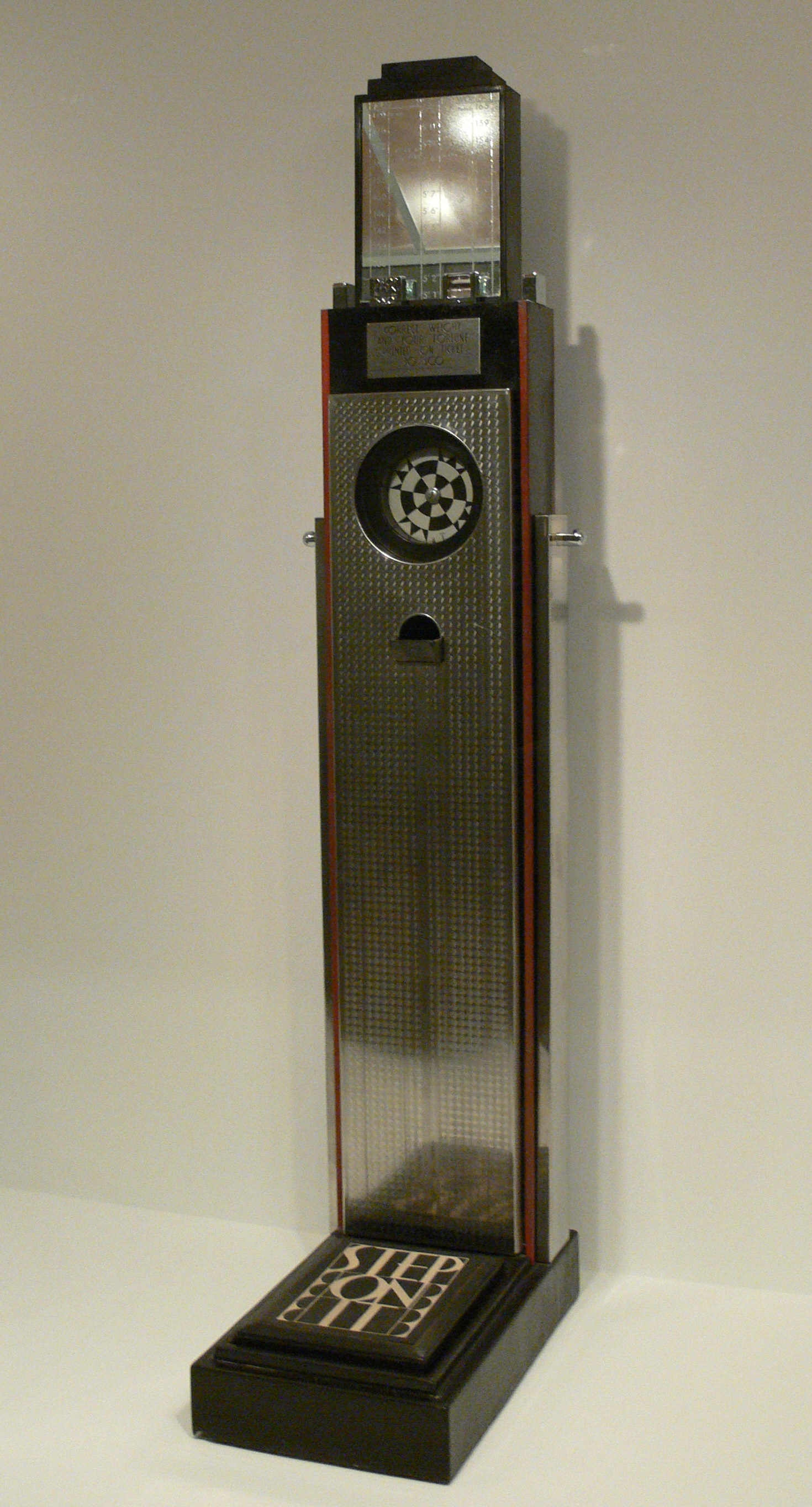
International Ticket Scale Corporation, Model S scale, 1927

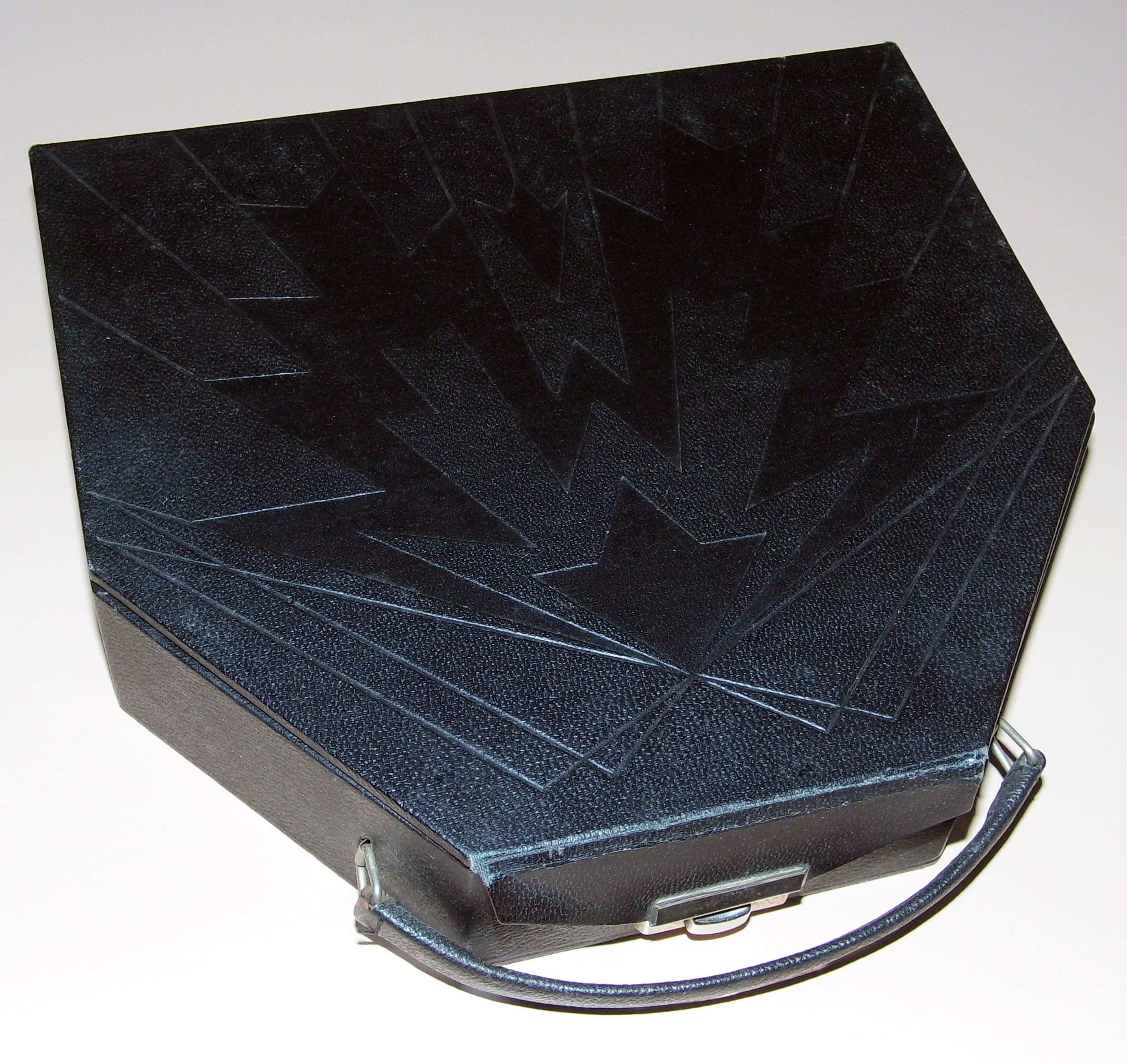
Dictograph Acousticon Silver Anniversary Model 28 carbon hearing aid case, 1928

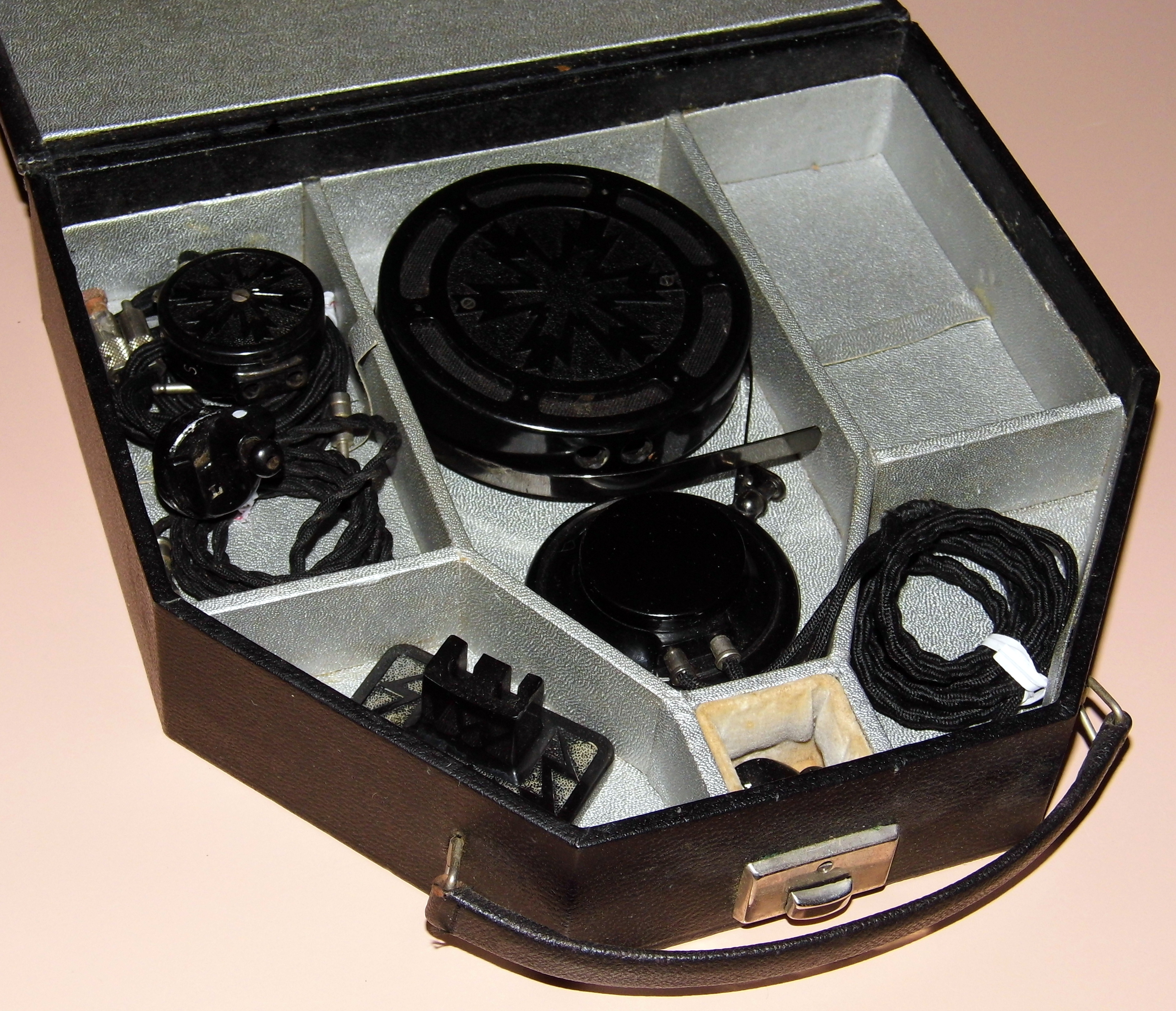
Dictograph Acousticon Silver Anniversary Model 28 carbon hearing aid and case, 1928

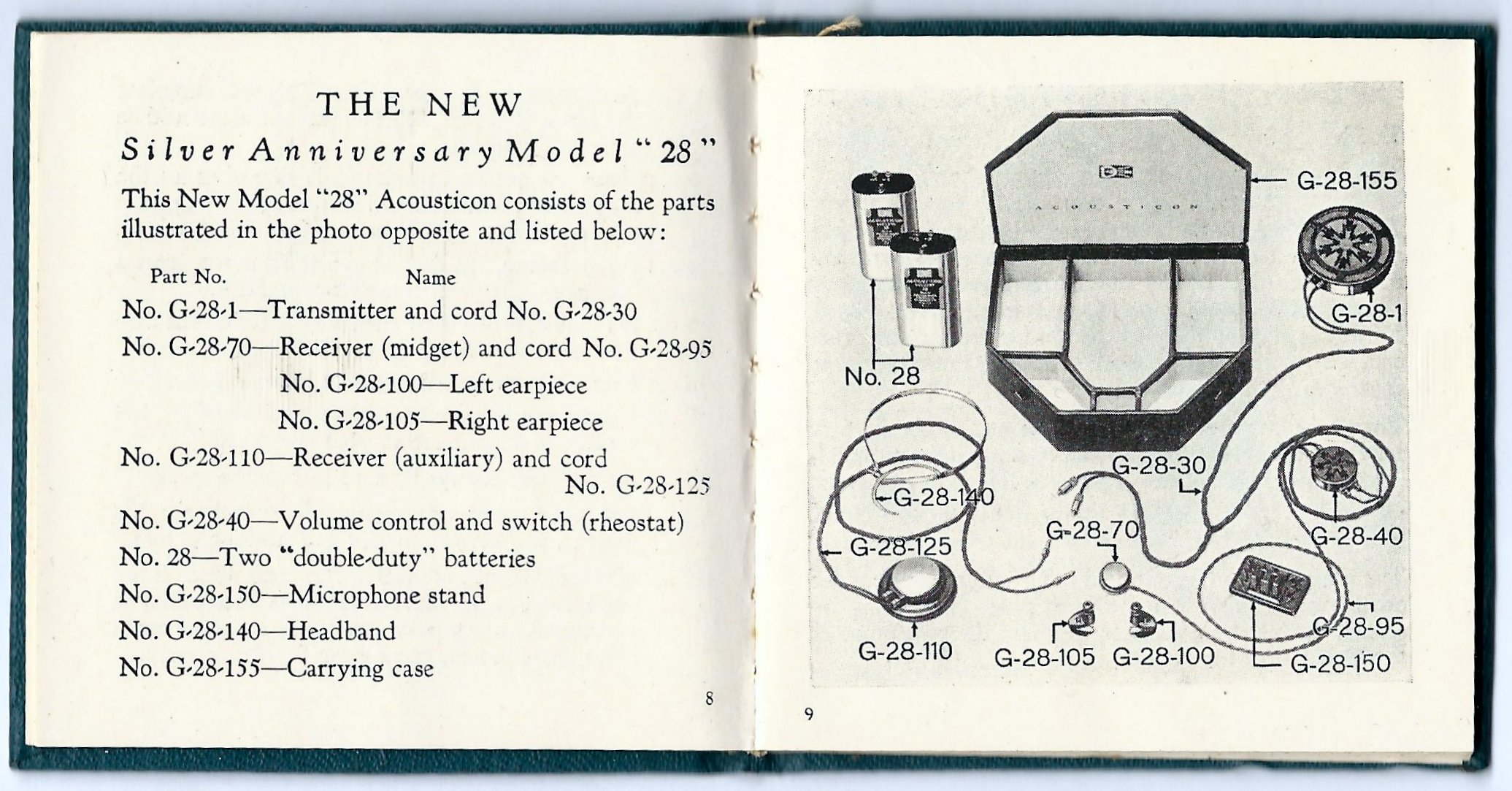
Dictograph Acousticon Silver Anniversary Model 28 instruction booklet, 1928

Marchant Figuremaster 8 FA calculator, 1948

== Publications ==
- US Patent 1479328, Joseph C. Sinel, "Improvements in Boxes", issued 1 January 1924
- Sinel, Joseph Claude (1924). A Book of American Trade-Marks and Devices. New York: Alfred A. Knopf – via Internet Archive.
- Sinel, Joseph Claude (1 May 1929). "Modern Industrial Design". Advertising & Selling. 13. Advertising and Selling Publishing Company, Inc.: 21.
- Sinel, Joseph Claude (9 July 1930). "What Is the Future of Industrial Design? Our Questions: Joseph Sinel's Answers". Advertising Arts. New York: Advertising and Selling Publishing Company, Inc.: 17–18 – via International Advertising & Design Database.
- Sinel, Joseph Claude (September 1932). "Designing a Salt Package". Advertising Arts. New York: Advertising and Selling Publishing Company, Inc.: 32 – via International Advertising & Design Database.
- Sinel, Joseph Claude (March 1933). "Artistic Abuse of the Plastics". Plastic Products. 9 (1). New York: Plastics Publications, Inc.: 13.
- Sinel, Joseph Claude (March 1938). "Importance of Design in Layout". Industrial Marketing. Vol. 23, no. 3. Chicago: Advertising Publications, Inc. pp. 24–25, 57.
- Sinel, Joseph Claude (1949). Newspaper Advertising Annual. Claremont, California: Saunders Press.

== Bibliography ==
- Anonymous (January 1933). "New Trends in the Arts". Survey Graphic. Vol. 22, no. 1. New York: Survey Associates, Inc. pp. 37–41.
- Anonymous. Attrib. George Nelson (February 1934). "Both Fish and Fowl" (PDF). Fortune. Vol. 9, no. 2. New York: Time Inc. pp. 40–43, 88, 90, 94, 97–98.
- Arens, Egmont (January 1931). "Package Engineering". Advertising Arts. New York: Advertising and Selling Publishing Company, Inc.: 13–20 – via International Advertising & Design Database.
- Calkins, Earnest Elmo (September 1931). "The Dividends of Beauty". Advertising Arts. New York: Advertising and Selling Publishing Company, Inc.: 13–18 – via International Advertising & Design Database.
- Bel Geddes, Norman (January 1931). "Designing the Office of Today". Advertising Arts. New York: Advertising and Selling Publishing Company, Inc.: 47–51 – via International Advertising & Design Database.
- Frank, Robert; Berstl, N (March 1930). "Joseph Sinel". Gebrauchsgraphik: International Advertising Art. 7 (3). Berlin: Phönix Illustrationsdruck und Verlag GMBH: 24–29.
- Gress, Edmund G., ed. (5 November 1924). "Sketches and Impressions of an American Printer: A Designer Who Likes the Forest Primeval". The American Printer: A Periodical of the Printing Business and the Graphic Arts. Vol. 79, no. 9. New York: Oswald Publishing Company. p. 38 – via HathiTrust.
- Holub, Leo (19 May 2003). "Oral history interview with Leo Holub, 1997, July 3 (transcript)" (Interview). Interviewed by Karlstrom, Paul. Washington DC: Smithsonian Institution: Archives of American Art. pp. 8–11.
- Hollister, Paul Merrick, ed. (1930). American Alphabets. New York: Harper & Brothers. pp. 105–114.
- Jackson, Gifford (February 1977). "Right in your eye and in your eye right". Designscape (88). Wellington: New Zealand Industrial Design Council.
- Jackson, Gifford (April–September 2003). "Right in your eye and in your eye right". ProDesign (53). Auckland: Associated Group Media.
- Kaplan, Wendy (2011). California Design, 1930–1965: Living in a Modern Way. Los Angeles, CA; Cambridge, MA: Los Angeles County Museum of Art; The MIT Press. pp. 337, 347. ISBN 9780262016070.
- Kendall, Frederick Charles, ed. (January 1932). "The Story of a Trademark: Designed by Joseph Sinel". Advertising Arts (79). New York: F. C. Kendall; Advertising and Selling Publishing Company, Inc.: 22–23 – via Internet Archive.
- Kendall, Frederick Charles, ed. (March 1932). "And Now: Good Design for Gasoline Pumps". Advertising Arts. New York: F. C. Kendall; Advertising and Selling Publishing Company, Inc. pp. 32–33 – via Internet Archive.
- Seitlin, Percy (June 1936). "Joseph Sinel—Artist to Industry". PM: An Intimate Journal for Production Managers, Art Directors and Their Associates. 2 (10). New York: P.M. Publishing Co.
- Sheldon, Roy (March 1932). Kendall, Frederick Charles (ed.). "These Packages". Advertising Arts. New York: F. C. Kendall; Advertising and Selling Publishing Company, Inc.: 19–29 – via Internet Archive.
- Sinel, Joseph (1972). "Jo Sinel: Father of American Industrial Design" (Interview). Interviewed by Harper, Robert. California College of Arts and Crafts. p. 24 – via Sinel Collection, California College of Arts and Crafts.
- Smythe, Michael (2011). New Zealand by Design: A History of New Zealand Product Design. Auckland: Random House. pp. 94–99.
- Teague, Walter Dorwin (July 1932). "Machine Age Aesthetics". Advertising Arts. New York: Advertising and Selling Publishing Company, Inc.: 7–12 – via International Advertising & Design Database.
- Watson, Ernest (15 April 1933). "A Beauty Expert at Work: The Place of the Engineering Designer in Industry". Scholastic. Vol. 22, no. 6. Pittsburgh: Scholastic Corporation. pp. 26–27.
