= Sinel =

Sinel is a surname. Notable people with this name include:

- João José Sinel de Cordes (1867–1930), Portuguese general and politician
- Rui Sinel de Cordes (born 1980), Portuguese author, comedian and television host
- Joseph Claude Sinel (1889–1975), New-Zealand-born American industrial designer
- Joseph Sinel (1844–1929), naturalist and archaeologist
- Ray Sinel, New Zealand rugby league footballer

== See also ==
- Sinel River, the right tributary of the river Someș in Romania
