= Philip Podsakoff =

Management academic (born 1948)

Philip Michael Podsakoff (born 1948) is an American management professor, researcher, author, and consultant who held the John F. Mee Chair of Management at the Kelley School of Business at Indiana University Bloomington. Currently, he is the Hyatt and Cici Brown Chair in Business at the University of Florida.

== Biography ==
Podsakoff was born in Fresno, California and graduated from Fresno High School. He then earned a BS in 1972 and MBA in 1974 from Fresno State College/California State University, Fresno, and a Doctor of Business Administration from Indiana University School of Business in 1980. His dissertation thesis was titled "Performance models, microeconomics and schedule responding in humans." Upon graduation from the doctoral program, he joined the management faculty of the Ohio State University for two years (1980–1982), and then returned to Indiana University as an assistant professor in the Management department, where he spent most of his career (1982–2013). He became an Emeritus professor at Indiana University in 2013, and joined the faculty of the Warrington College of Business at the University of Florida in Gainesville, Florida. Podsakoff has also consulted with several domestic and international companies, including Ashland Chemical Co., Dow Chemical, Duke Realty, Eli Lilly and Company, General Electric, Kimball International, Harrah's Entertainment, Price Waterhouse Coopers, Prudential Insurance Company of America, State Farm Insurance Company, and Texas Gas Company. Philip is married to Vernie (Vera, nee Kochergin) Podsakoff; they have one child, Nathan Podsakoff, who is a professor in the Eller College of Management at the University of Arizona.

== Selected publications ==
=== Books ===
- Scott, W E, and Philip M. Podsakoff. Behavioral Principles in the Practice of Management. New York: Wiley, 1985. ISBN 9780471062486
- Organ, Dennis W, Philip M. Podsakoff, & Scott B. MacKenzie. Organizational Citizenship Behavior: Its Nature, Antecedents, and Consequences. Thousand Oaks: SAGE Publications, 2006. ISBN 9780761929963. According to WorldCat, this book is held in 408 libraries around the world.
- Podsakoff, P.M., MacKenzie, S.B., & Podsakoff, N.P. (Eds.). (2018). The Oxford Handbook of Organizational Citizenship Behavior. Oxford, UK: Oxford University Press.ISBN 9780190219000

=== Selected articles ===
- Podsakoff, P.M., & Organ, D.W. (1986). Self-reports in organizational research: Problems and prospects. Journal of Management, 12, pages 531–544.
- Podsakoff, P.M., & Todor, W.D. (1985). Relationships between leader reward and punishment behavior and group processes and productivity. Journal of Management, 11, pages 55–73.
- Jarvis, C.B., MacKenzie, S.B., & Podsakoff, P.M. (2003). A critical review of construct indicators and measurement model misspecification in marketing and consumer research. Journal of Consumer Research, 30, pages 199–218.
- Podsakoff, P.M., MacKenzie, S.B., Lee, J.Y., & Podsakoff, N.P. (2003). Common method biases in behavioral research: A critical review of the literature and recommended remedies. Journal of Applied Psychology, 88, pages 879–903.
- MacKenzie, S.B., Podsakoff, P.M., & Jarvis, C.B. (2005). The problem of measurement model misspecification in behavioral and organizational research and some recommended solutions. Journal of Applied Psychology, 90, pages 710–730.
- MacKenzie, S.B., Podsakoff, P.M., & Podsakoff, N.P. (2011). Construct measurement and validation procedures in MIS and behavioral research: Integrating new and existing techniques. MIS Quarterly, 35, pages 293–334.
- Podsakoff, P.M., MacKenzie, S.B., & Podsakoff, N.P. (2012). Sources of method bias in social science research and recommendations on how to control it. Annual Review of Psychology, 63, pages 539–569.
- Podsakoff, P.M., MacKenzie, S.B., Moorman, R., & Fetter, R. (1990).The impact of transformational leader behaviors on employee trust, satisfaction, and organizational citizenship behaviors. The Leadership Quarterly, 1, 107–142.
- Podsakoff, P.M., MacKenzie, S.B., & Bommer, W. (1996). A Meta-analysis of the relationships between Kerr and Jermier's substitutes for leadership and employee job attitudes, role perceptions, and performance. Journal of Applied Psychology, 81, pages 380–399.
- Podsakoff, P.M., MacKenzie, S.B., & Bommer, W. (1996). Transformational leader behaviors and substitutes for leadership as determinants of employee satisfaction, commitment, trust, and organizational citizenship behaviors. Journal of Management, 22, pages 259–298.
- Podsakoff, P.M., Bommer, W.H., Podsakoff, N.P., & MacKenzie, S.B. (2006). Relationships between leader reward and punishment behavior and subordinate attitudes, perceptions, and behaviors: A meta-analytic review of existing and new research. Organizational Behavior and Human Decision Processes, 99, pages 113–142.
- Podsakoff, P.M., Ahearne, M., & MacKenzie, S.B. (1997). Organizational citizenship behavior and the quantity and quality of work group performance. Journal of Applied Psychology, 82, pages 262–270.
- Podsakoff, P.M., & MacKenzie, S.B. (1997). The Impact of organizational citizenship behavior on organizational performance: A review and suggestions for future research. Human Performance, 10, pages 133–151.
- Podsakoff, P.M., MacKenzie, S.B., Paine, J. & Bachrach, D.G. (2000). Organizational citizenship behaviors: A critical review of the theoretical and empirical literature and suggestions for future research. Journal of Management, 26, pages 513–563.
- Podsakoff, N.P., Whiting, S.W., Podsakoff, P.M., & Blume, B.D. (2009). Individual- and organizational-level consequences of organizational citizenship behaviors: A meta-analysis. Journal of Applied Psychology, 94, pages 122–141.
- Podsakoff, P.M., MacKenzie, S.B., Bachrach, D.G., & Podsakoff, N.P. (2005). The influence of management journals in the 1980s and 1990s. Strategic Management Journal, 26, pages 473–488.
- Podsakoff, P.M., MacKenzie, S.B., Podsakoff, N.P., & Bachrach, D.G. (2008). Scholarly influence in the field of management: A bibliometric analysis of the determinants of university and author impact in the management literature in the past quarter century. Journal of Management, 34, pages 641–720.

== Awards and honors ==
- In 2000, he was awarded The Leadership Quarterly's Decennial Influential Article Award (for Podsakoff, MacKenzie, Moorman, & Fetter, 1990), given by the editors a decade after an article is published “as a celebration of the article’s impact on the field.”
- In 2005, he was awarded the William A. Owens Scholarly Achievement Award (for Podsakoff, MacKenzie, Lee, & Podsakoff, 2003). This award recognizes the best publication (in a refereed journal) in the field of industrial and organizational psychology.
- In 2013, he was awarded the Academy of Management's (AOM) Research Methods Division's Lifetime Achievement Award, for his significant contributions to the advancement of research methodology.
- In 2018, he was awarded the Society for Industrial and Organizational Psychology's (SIOP) Distinguished Scientific Contributions Award in recognition of a lifetime of outstanding contributions to the science of industrial and organizational psychology.
- In 2019, he received the Academy of Management's Distinguished Scholarly Contributions of Management Award in recognition of "long-term, significant contributions in one or more of the following areas: conceptual, empirical or theoretical developments; creating and disseminating new knowledge; and advancing management knowledge and practice."
- In 2021, he received the Samuel J. Messick Distinguished Scientific Contributions Award, given by Division 5 (Quantitative and Qualitative Methods) of the American Psychological Association (APA). This award is presented annually to honor an individual who has a long and distinguished history of scientific contributions within the field of quantitative research methods.
- In 2025, he received SIOP's Distinguished Teaching Contributions Award, which recognizes an individual who has a record of excellence in teaching I-O psychology, developing students, and serving the teaching community.
- He is a Fellow of both the AOM (elected 2009) and SIOP (elected 2007).

According to the Web of Science, Podsakoff's research has been cited over 109,000 (h index = 58); and according to Google Scholar, his work has received over 243,000 citations (h index = 82).
