= Karl Eller =

American businessman and entrepreneur (1928–2019)

- Born: June 20, 1928
- Died: March 10, 2019 (aged 90)
- Education: University of Arizona
- Occupations: Advertising; CEO
- Years active: 1950-1990
- Organization(s): Foster & Kleiser; Circle K
- Spouse: Joan "Stevie" Stevens (m. 1952; died 2019)
- Awards: Advertising Hall of Fame; Arizona Historymaker

Karl Eller (June 20, 1928 – March 10, 2019) was an American businessman and entrepreneur.

== Early life ==
Eller grew up in Tucson, Arizona. He played football at Tucson High School and collegiately at the University of Arizona where he was a member of the Phi Gamma Delta fraternity.

== Career ==
In 1962, Eller purchased the Arizona operations of New York-based billboard advertising company Foster & Kleiser and built it into a major regional business.

Eller merged the outdoor advertising business with KTAR radio and television in 1968 to form Combined Communications, Inc., which was absorbed by Gannett in 1979. At its height, Combined Communications owned 7 major metropolitan television stations, 14 major metropolitan radio stations, 12 American and 2 Canadian outdoor advertising companies and two metropolitan daily newspapers.

Eller would later go on to become the head of Columbia Pictures Communications, during which he helped with its parent company's 1983 merger with The Coca-Cola Company, and of the convenience store chain Circle K, which was based in Phoenix during Eller's tenure as CEO (1983–1990). During that time, Eller built Circle K into the second largest convenience store operation and the largest publicly owned convenience store chain in the U.S. with 4,641 stores in 32 states and an additional 1,386 licensed or joint venture stores in thirteen foreign countries. Under his leadership, the company grew from annual sales of $747 million to $3.4 billion. Circle K then declared bankruptcy and Eller resigned in 1990.

In 1992 Karl returned to his advertising roots founding Eller Media, a new outdoor advertising business. He purchased 300 outdoor billboards from Gannett Outdoor in the Phoenix market and built it into a nationwide company in 25 large markets across the country. Eller sold the company in 1997 to Clear Channel Communications of San Antonio. Eller was retained as President/CEO until he retired in 2002.

=== Sports ===
As a result of the influence garnered by his leadership at Foster & Kleiser, Eller became a founding investor in several Phoenix area sports teams. He invested in the Phoenix Roadrunners in 1967. A year later he was a key investor in the Phoenix Suns, Phoenix’s NBA team and first major sports league. Eller's ownership group hired future Suns owner Jerry Colangelo as its inaugural general manager.

He was one of the original Fiesta Bowl Founders serving as a driving force to bring the game to Phoenix in 1971. In 1978, Eller made a pitch to the Pac 8 Conference to accept Arizona State University and University of Arizona from the Western Athletic Conference into theirs forming the Pac 10.

Eller also played an instrumental role putting together a deal with the Bidwill family in 1988 that allowed for the St. Louis Cardinals to move to Arizona.

== Death and Legacy ==
Karl Eller died on March 10, 2019, at age 90.

Eller was recognized in 2001 by the Arizona Historical Society as an Arizona Historymaker, recognizing him for his contributions to local culture, business and philanthropy. Eller was inducted into the Advertising Hall of Fame by the American Advertising Federation in March 2004 in New York City. Eller is also the first Arizonan and second outdoor advertising executive to be elected to the Advertising Hall of Fame.

Karl Eller is the namesake of the Eller College of Management at the University of Arizona, where he was also an alumnus.

== Articles ==
- Miracle in a Glass — (Feb. 1979) Karl Eller, then President of Combined Communications Corp., gives a speech on November 15, 1978, dealing with the free enterprise system.

== Awards ==
- Eller received the 2016 Heritage Award from the Arizona Chamber of Commerce and Industry.

== Mentions ==
- Karl Eller's Big Thirst for Convenience Stores — (June 1988) Karl Eller, then Chairman of Phoenix, Arizona-based Circle K Corp., plans to mold Circle K into the industry's most aggressive, fastest-growing player. The number of Circle K stores tripled to about 4,600 under Eller's leadership, and sales soared to $2.3 billion from $747.8 million.

Sporting positions
New creation	Phoenix Suns owner 1968–1987	Succeeded by Jerry Colangelo
