= Economic and Business Research Center =

The Economic and Business Research Center in the Eller College of Management at The University of Arizona, Tucson, is a unit that has been providing the citizens of Arizona with high-quality economic forecasts and applied economic research since 1949. The Economic and Business Research Center's mission is to provide the Arizona community of business and public-sector decision makers with applied research and information on economic, demographic and business trends in Arizona.

== Activities ==
- Providing the public with economic forecasts, socioeconomic and demographic data, and economic analysis for the state of Arizona and its metro areas via public presentations, publications and their website.
- In addition to providing economic forecasts to the public in general, EBR also provides in-depth economic forecast analysis and databases on a subscription basis to government and business via its economic forecasting unit, The Forecasting Project. This subscription includes access to extensive online databases of important economic, demographic, and quality of life indicators for the State of Arizona, its metro areas and counties.
- Arizona's Economy, quarterly online magazine provides analysis of current economic trends and issues in Arizona.
- Conducting research in the areas of:
  - Regional economic, revenue and population forecasting
  - Economic impact analysis
  - Border and regional development
  - Environmental/sustainable economics
  - Renewable energy
  - Public finance and taxation
  - Industry studies
- Responding to data requests and educating the public about data resources and best practices in the use of public data
- EBR's Annual Economic Outlook Luncheon, held each December, provides the Arizona community with a summary analysis of the latest economic forecast for Arizona and the nation. Six months later each June, EBR revisits the forecast in a Mid-Year Economic Outlook Breakfast.
- Arizona Statistical Abstract

== Research Studies ==
The Economic and Business Research Center conducts applied research and analysis on a wide variety of topics pertaining to economic conditions and trends in Arizona and the Southwest and border region. The following are some of the significant studies conducted in the past:

- RTA Economic Impact Study and Revenue vs. Bid/Cost Comparison, Final Report

Alberta H. Charney, Ph.D. (11pp). December 21, 2009

- Arizona-Sonora Region: Economic Indicators and Regional Initiatives, 2009

Vera K. Pavlakovich-Kochi, Ph.D., and Jaewon Lim, Ph.D., 2009

- Economic And Revenue Impact of $1 Million in Sustained Cancer Research Funds

Alberta H. Charney, Ph.D., and Marshall J. Vest., February 2008

- Town of Sahuarita Workforce Assessment Survey

Maile Nadelhoffer, M.S., M.A., August 2008

- Mexican Visitors to Arizona: Visitor Characteristics and Economic Impacts, 2007–08

Vera K. Pavlakovich-Kochi, Ph.D. and Alberta H. Charney, Ph.D. (82pp). December 2008

- Astronomy, Planetary and Space Sciences Research in Arizona: An Economic and Tax Revenue Impact Study

Vera K. Pavlakovich-Kochi, Ph.D., Alberta H. Charney, Ph.D., Lora Mwaniki-Lyman (29pp). October 2007

- A Strategic Assessment of the Economic Benefits of Investments in Research in Arizona

Alberta H. Charney, Ph.D., Kent Hill, Ph.D., Dennis Hoffman, Ph. D., Jose Lobo, Ph.D., Maile Nadelhoffer, M.S., M.A. (117pp). April 2007

- The Role of Arizona Cities and Towns in the State's Economy

Tanis J. Salant, D.P.A.; Alberta H. Charney, Ph.D.; Marshall J. Vest. October 2006.

- The University of Arizona Economic and Tax Revenue Impacts FY 2004

Alberta H. Charney, Ph.D., Vera K. Pavlakovich-Kochi, Ph.D., Lora Mwaniki-Lyman and Sushila Umashankar, Ph.D. (30pp). November 2005.

== The Forecasting Project ==
The Forecasting Project is a community-sponsored research unit within the Economic and Business Research Center producing quarterly economic forecasts for Arizona. These forecasts are recognized as among the most accurate in the Western states.

The following are some of the services provided to sponsoring organizations:

- In-depth economic forecasts and analysis provided on a quarterly basis for Arizona, as well as, the Phoenix-Mesa-Glendale and Tucson metro areas.
- A comprehensive examination of the forecast and business conditions four times a year in roundtable sessions with Eller College economists, other sponsors, and invited speakers.
- Quarterly report containing analysis and tables of forecasted variables, economic indicators, and 35 pages of graphs illustrating recent trends.
- Access to economic forecasting models and supporting data in AREMOS databanks and EXCEL spreadsheets. AREMOS is a product of Global Insight, a national leader in economic consulting and forecasting.
- Long run 30-year forecasts each August.
- Access to The Forecasting Project website for easy downloading of data, reports, and analysis.
- Consulting on issues related to corporate economics and forecasting.

== People ==
- George Hammond, Ph.D., Director and Eller Research Professor
- Alberta H. Charney, Ph.D., Senior Research Economist*
- Dan Kinnear, Specialist, Business Research
- Maile Nadelhoffer, Research Economist and Webmaster
- Pia Montoya, Computer Database Specialist
- Jennifer Pullen, Research Economist
- Valorie Rice, Senior Specialist, Business Information
- Vera Pavlakovich-Kochi, Ph.D., senior research scientist
