= Jacques-Eugène Armengaud =

French industrial engineer

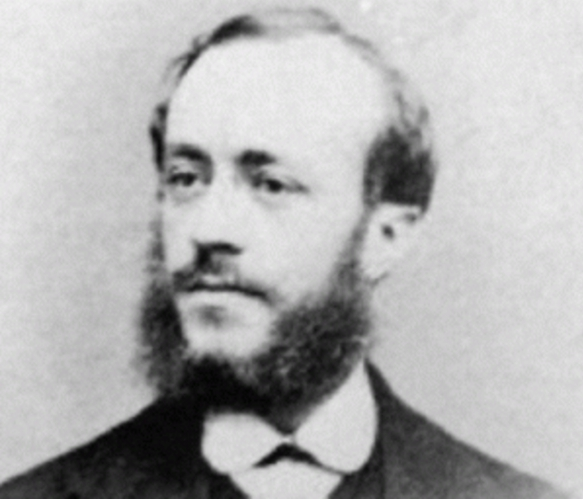
Jacques-Eugène Armengaud

Jacques-Eugène Armengaud (25 October 1810 – 23 January 1891) was a French industrial engineer, and professor of machine drawing at the Conservatoire national des arts et métiers (CNAM), particularly known as the original author of The practical draughtsman's book of industrial design, 1851.

== Life and work ==
Born in Ostend, Armengaud graduated from the School of Arts and Crafts at Châlons-sur-Marne, and became professor of machine drawing at the Conservatoire national des arts et métiers (CNAM) in Paris.

Jacques-Eugene Armengaud and his brother Charles (1813–1893) worked as patent agents and consulting engineers. Later Armengaud taught machine drawing at Conservatoire national des arts et métiers, and was partner in a machine factory. He specialized in the mechanical engineering and the design of machines, on which he wrote a series of books. His work made a significant contribution to the disclosure of new construction techniques in his days. He also edited the journal Publication industrielle des machines.

Armengaud died in Paris, 23 January 1891, at the age of 81.

== Work ==
=== The practical draughtsman's book, 1851 ===
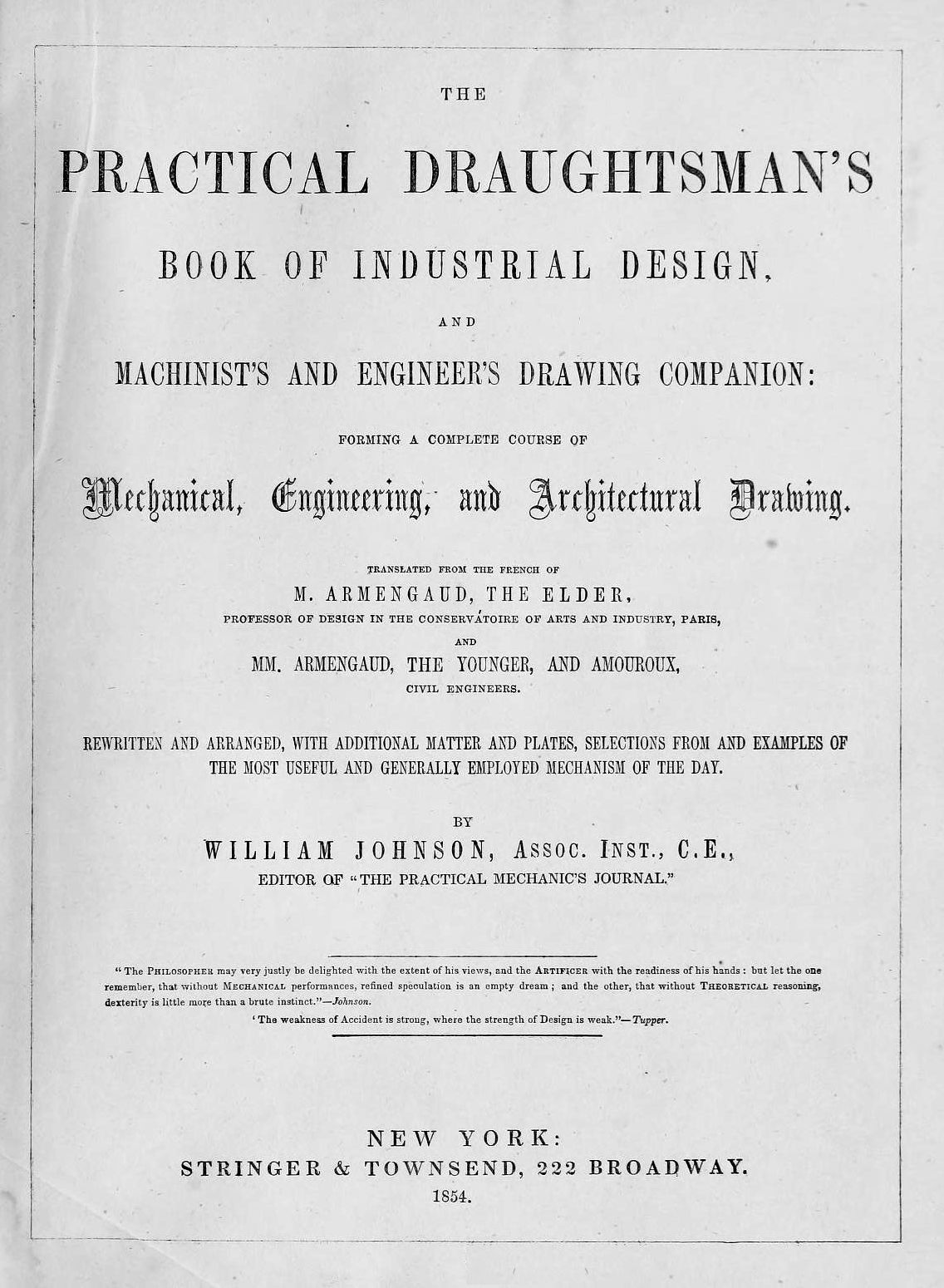
The practical draughtsman's book of industrial design, 1854

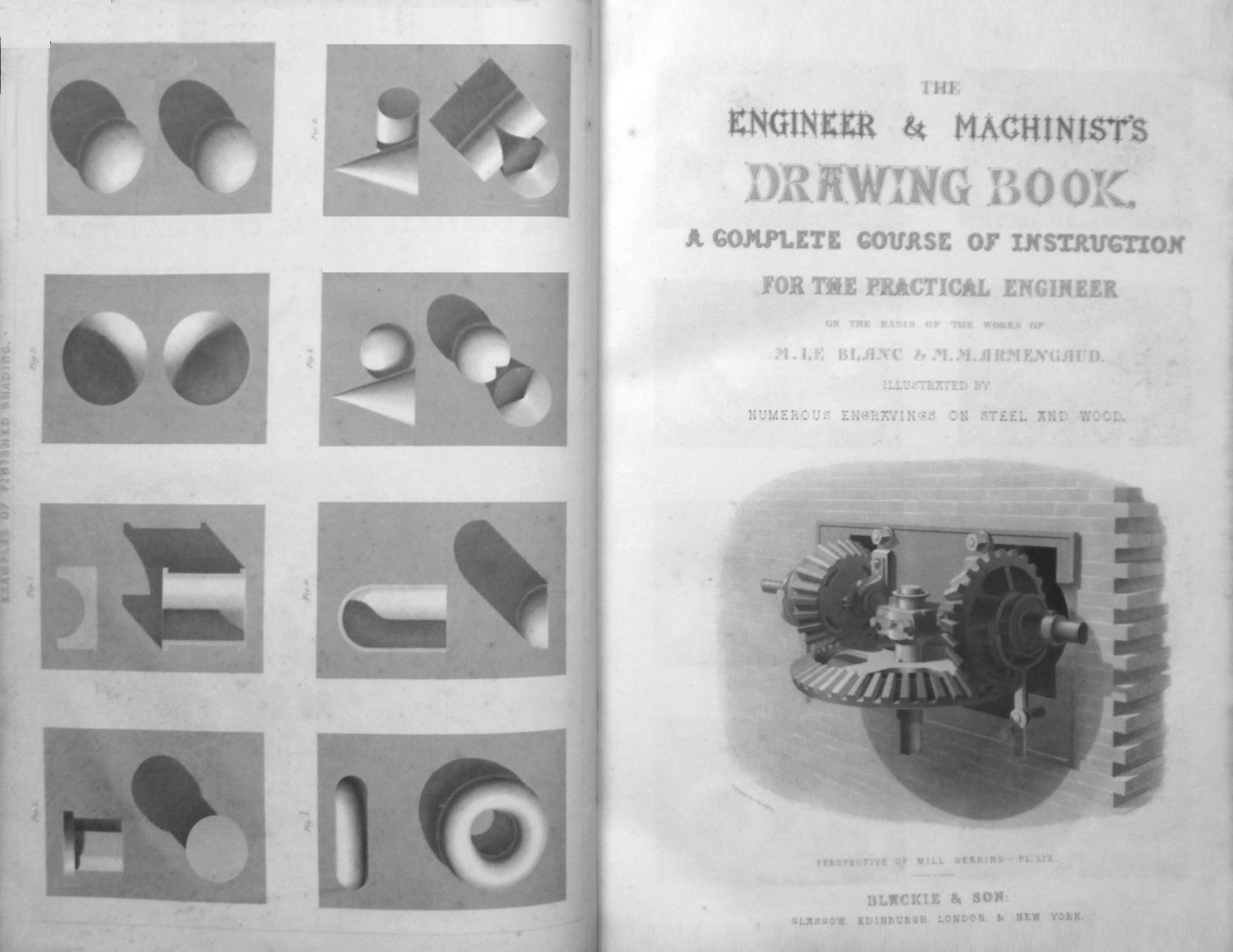
The engineer and machinist's drawing-book, 1860

The Practical Draughtsman's Book of industrial design by Armengaud, Armengaud and Amouroux was originally published in French as Nouveau cours raisonné de dessin industriel in 1848. The subtitle of the (translated) work already explains, that it wants to offer a "complete course of mechanical, engineering, and architectural drawing." The study of those types of technical drawing, according to Armengaud, belong to the field of industrial design. In the preface Armengaud characterized this field:

"INDUSTRIAL DESIGN is destined to become a universal language; for in our material age of rapid transition, from abstract, to applied, Science — in the midst of our extraordinary tendency towards the perfection of the means of conversion, or manufacturing production — it must soon pass current in every land.

Armengaud was convinced that the study of Industrial Design is an "indispensably necessary as the ordinary rudiments of learning. It ought to form an essential feature in the education of young persons for whatever profession or employment they may intend to select, as the great business of their lives; for without a knowledge of drawing, no scientific work, whether relating to Mechanics, Agriculture, or Manufactures, can be advantageously studied."

About the mission of the Practical Draughtsman’s Book of Industrial Design, Armengaud summarized:

"It is intended to furnish gradually developed lessons in Geometrical Drawing, applied directly to the various branches of the Industrial Arts : comprehending Linear Design proper; Isometrical Perspective, or the study of Projections; the Drawing of Toothed Wheels and Eccentrics; with Shadowing and Colouring; Oblique Projections; and the study of parallel and exact Perspective; each division being accompanied by special applications to the extensive ranges of Mechanics, Architecture, Foundry-Works, Carpentry, Joinery, Metal Manufactures generally, Hydraulics, the construction of Steam Engines, and Mill-Work. In its compilation, the feeble attraction generally offered to students in elementary form has been carefully considered; and after every geometrical problem, a practical example of its application has been added, to facilitate its comprehension and increase its value."

One of the examples published in the 1860 edition was the design of the Nicholas Chain Bridge, designed by Charles Blacker Vignoles and pictured by John Cooke Bourne.

== Legacy ==
The practical draughtsman's book of industrial design was published mid 19th century in a time that a new type of technical manuals for students emerged, which contained instructions for self-teaching for the drawing of technical objects. This work paved the way for a big expansion in the field drawing education in France, the United Kingdom and the United States.

Two popular and influential writers of these works in Britain were Robert Scott Burn and William S. Binns. According to Romans (2005) in this genre The practical draughtsman's book of industrial design, might have been the most influential publication. Later in the 19th century a whole range of manuals on technical drawings were published.

In the United States another notable art educator and author of drawing books was Walter Smith (art educator) (1836 - 1886), who had significant influence of the American industrial art education.

== Selected publications ==
French publications

- Jacques-Eugène Armengaud, Charles Armengaud. L'industrie des chemins de fer ou dessins et descriptions des principales machines locomotives..., Mathias, 1839
- Jacques-Eugèneaîné Armengaud. Publication industrielle des machines, outils et appareils les plus perfectionnés et les plus récents employés dans les différentes branches de l'industrie française et etrangère, Paris : L. Mathias, 1841.
- Jacques-Eugèneaîné Armengaud. Nouveau cours raisonné de dessin industriel appliqué principalement à la mécanique et à l'architecture, 1848.
- Eugène Armengaud, Jules Amouroux, Charles Armengaud. Cours élémentaire de dessin industriel à l'usage des écoles primaires. Paris : Bureau de la "Publication industrielle", 1848.
- Jacques-Eugèneaîné Armengaud. A Traité théorique et pratique des moteurs hydrauliques, 2 vols, 1858.
- Jacques-Eugèneaîné Armengaud. Traité théorique et pratique des moteurs a vapeur, 3 vols. Paris : Claye, 1861-62.
- Jacques-Eugèneaîné Armengaud. Le vignole des mécaniciens; essai sur la construction des machines, études des éléments qui les constituent, types et proportions des organes qui composent les moteurs, les transmissions de mouvement et autres mécanismes, Paris : A. Morel & Cie., 1863.
- Jacques-Eugèneaîné Armengaud. Publication industrielle des machines, outils et appareils les plus perfectionnés et les plus récents employés dans les différentes branches de l'industrie française et étrangère, 1871.
- Jacques-Eugèneaîné Armengaud. Garantie de la propriété industrielle en France et à l'étranger, 1876.
- Jacques-Eugèneaîné Armengaud. Instructions pratiques à l'usage des inventeurs, commentaire raisonné des lois qui régissent actuellement les brevets d'invention dans les principaux pays industriels, par Armengaud aîné,..., 1880.

Translated into English

- Charles A. Armengaud and Jules Amouroux. The practical draughtsman's book of industrial design, and machinist's and engineer's drawing companion: forming a complete course of mechanical, engineering, and architectural drawing. with translated by William Johnson (1823-1864). 1851, 1854, 1863 etc.
- Leblanc, V., Armengaud, Jacques Eugène, Armengaud, Charles A. The engineer and machinist's drawing-book; a complete course of instruction for the practical engineer..., Blackie and Son, 1855; 1860.
