= WikID =

Industrial design wiki

WikID was a semantic industrial design engineering reference wiki, originally started in 2008 by the Faculty of Industrial Design Engineering at the Delft University of Technology. As a design tool, it offered information in a compact manner tailored to a users' group (industrial designers). Information was organised from three viewpoints: design methods, design aspects, and product domains.

== Design methods ==
Included here were design theories, design methods, and design techniques. These techniques are for example creativity techniques or techniques to create the design goal or techniques to evaluate product features in a product design.

== Design aspects ==
Included here were ergonomics, production techniques, aesthetics, product safety, sustainability, energy techniques, costs, materials, logistics, marketing, interaction, quality (aspects usually found in lists of requirements for product designs).

== Product domains ==
Included here were office environments, kitchen environments, the medical domain, etc. (domains in which the to be designed product would be used).
