= School of Industrial Art and Technical Design for Women =

School of Industrial Art and Technical Design for Women was an American school of industrial design founded in 1881 and located in New York City. Pupils were made familiar with the practicality of design, with the workings of machinery, and the technicalities of design as applied to various industries. In its day, it was said to be the only school of practical design for industrial manufacture in the world.

Florence Elizabeth Cory organized her first class of five pupils in autumn 1881, instructing them in the principles of design and the practical application of those principles to industrial art. From that nucleus sprang the prosperous school which by 1890, included 490 students, including correspondent pupils, all of whom were striving to attain a degree of proficiency in several departments of practical designing and industrial handicraft that would enable them to become self-supporting. Among these students were representatives of every State and Territory in the United States, several Canadian cities, and the Sandwich Islands. Cory died in 1902. The school had closed by 1908.

== History ==
The organization of this particular school grew out of a forceful necessity for its existence. The schools then existing taught the principles of design only, without regard to the practical application, and consequently the young women who graduated from such schools found great difficulty in obtaining employment or in disposing of their designs.

In other schools of design, the teachers taught a woman to make a wall paper design; sit her down with paper, brushes and colors, she could make a beautiful design, but would not know (neither would the teachers) whether that design could be printed by machinery or not. She would not know how many colors she should use; how the colors should fall, the dimensions, or anything of the kind; the teachers do not know. A design may be well executed, faultlessly correct, and beautiful, yet worthless to the manufacturer, because it cannot be woven or printed. Machinery has its requirements and its limitations, all of which must be considered when making design, and without the practical knowledge necessary to do this an acceptable working design could not be made.

The school was managed by a president and a board of directors. There were 8 instructors, all of whom were graduates of the school. The number of pupils in the elementary class of 1901 was 35, and in the advanced class, 40. The number of graduates at that time was 600.

Numerous invitations were extended by manufacturers in New York and vicinity to visit their factories, and prizes amounted to several hundred dollars were offered for various designs, and a variety of valuable art specimens presented. Many designs were made and sold to manufacturers since the establishment of the school. The work done included carpets of all grades, oil cloths, linoleums, wall papers, stained glass, carved and inlaid wood panels, printed silks and silkalines, ribbons, upholstery fabrics, portieres, table linen of all kinds, calicoes, prints, awnings, lace, fan mounts, book covers, china, Christmas, Easter, and menu cards. Not only were orders filled for American manufacturers, but there were international opportunities as well: to Leeds and York, England, patterns for ingrains; to Carlsbad, Austria, designs for china; to Dundee, Scotland, patterns for table linen and towel borders; and to Japan, designs for printed and embroidered silks.

== Objective ==
The chief object of this school was to give instruction in the practical application of art designs, so that when a pupil had completed the course, she would be competent to do practical work which would have both an artistic and a commercial value.

== Admission requirements ==
The school is open to any young woman of good moral character upon payment of the required tuition fee. Pupils can enter the school at any time. Pupils who have not become practically familiar with drawing will be obliged to enter the elementary class. Pupils desiring to enter the advanced classes will be required to present specimens of their work—free-hand drawing—flowers from nature or conventionalized ornamental figures, scrolls, and so forth.

== Tuition and commission ==
The charges for tuition were as follows: Elementary classes, US$25 per term, or $75 for four consecutive terms; advanced classes, $30 per term, or $85 for four consecutive terms. In addition to the standard tuition, there were a number of special courses costing from §10 to $25 per term. Arrangements were also made to receive special students at a rate of $10 per month in elementary work and $15 per month in advanced work.

All drawings made in the school were the property of the pupil who made them, with the exception of one sheet from each set made, which was retained as the property of the school. Pupils had the privilege of disposing of all salable designs to manufacturers while still under instruction. Many pupils were thus able to wholly or partly pay their expenses at the school. A commission of 10 per cent was required on all sales made by pupils while still under instruction in the school.

== Program ==
During the first two or three years of the school's existence, lectures were given to the students by prominent artists and designers, but these were discontinued because the classes soon assumed such proportions that there was not room enough to accommodate all who wished to hear them.

The full course of instruction required two yearas. The school year was divided into four terms of three months each. Sessions were held every day from 10 AM to 4 PM. The courses of instruction included elementary and advanced work in ornamental and practical designing as applied to carpets, rugs, wall paper, oilcloth, stained glass, lace, silk, calico, book covers, and so forth.

- The first year classes were taught simple designing for calico, muslin, stained glass, inlaid woods, and jewelry. The elementary class also included flower painting.
- In the second year, the pupils learned advanced designs for oil-cloth, silk, carpets, and other mediums.
- The optional third year was passed in the practice and design room, where no regular instruction was given, but where orders were received and work done under the supervision of the principal, and well-known designers.
- In addition to the regular classes, there was a department of home study and a correspondence class for those who could not conveniently attend the school.

== Building and fittings ==
The rooms occupied by the school were rented. The equipment cost about US$1,000, and was provided by Cory. The school was maintained by tuition fees. The cost of maintenance was $3,000 per annum.

== Graduates ==
The graduates were fitted to do practical work before leaving the school, and were not required to undergo a period of apprenticeship. In Cory's opinion, there was hardly any branch of industry in which artistic skill and taste were a component part which had not benefited by this class of schools. They have trained up a distinctively American class of designers, illustrators, and decorators whose talents have contributed to the development and success of many establishments, especially those engaged in the printing and textile industries. The effect upon those who have been under instruction is said to be beneficial in every respect. Many of the graduates are earning much higher wages than they could possibly command in other occupations where women are employed. She wrote in 1891: "By far the greater number of graduates are at work in their own homes, and are not employed regularly at a stated salary by any manufacturer. When their designs are finished they are sold to whichever manufactory pays the highest price."
