= TU Delft Faculty of Industrial Design Engineering =

Division of Delft University of Technology, Netherlands

Faculty of Industrial Design
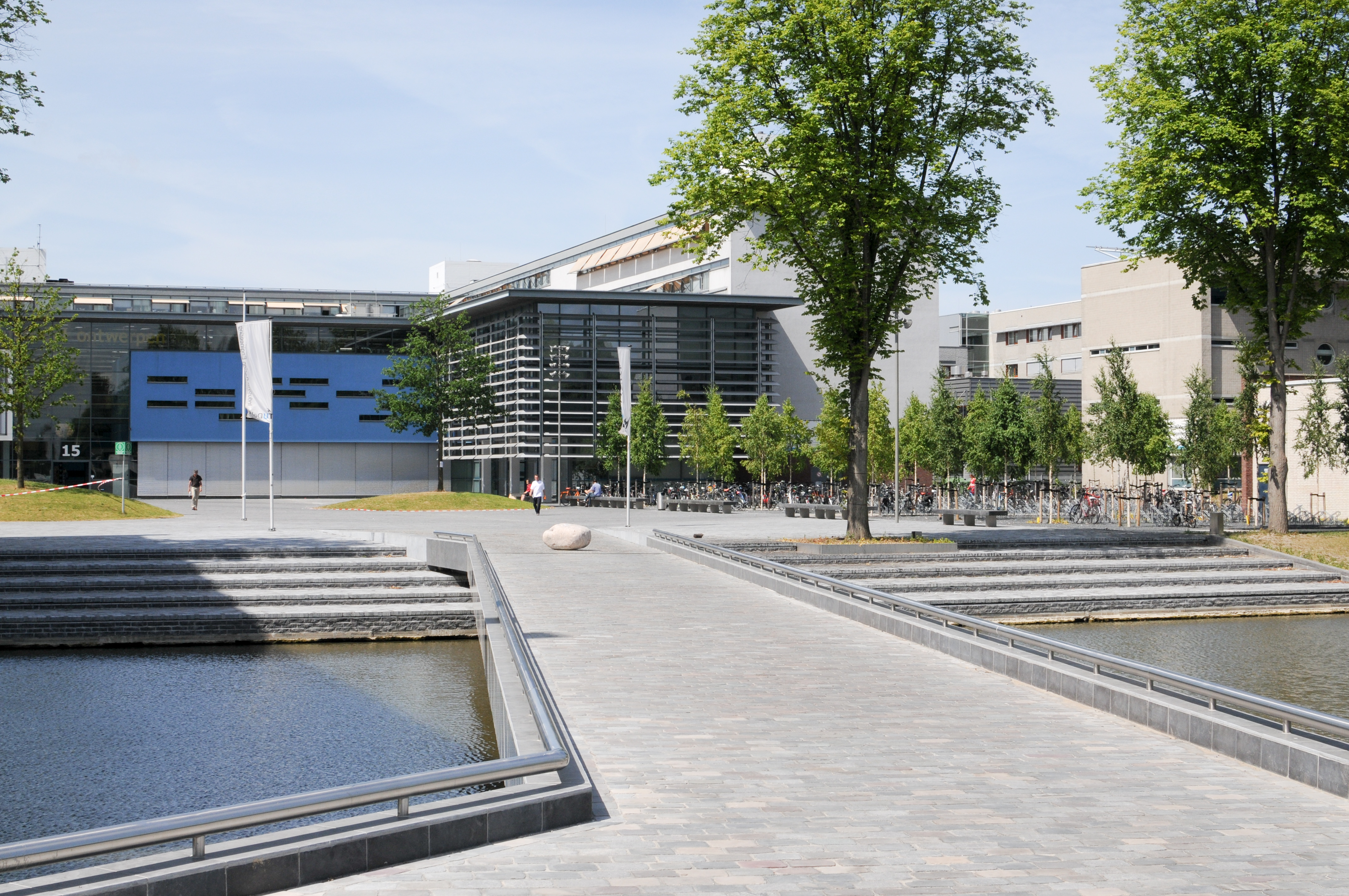
- Type: Public
- Established: 1969
- Dean: Prof.dr.ir. Caspar Chorus
- Academic staff: 350
- Students: 2100
- Location: Delft, Netherlands
- Website: www.tudelft.nl/io/

The Faculty of Industrial Design Engineering (IDE; (Dutch: Faculteit Industrieel Ontwerpen, IO; abbr. IO) is part of Delft University of Technology (TU Delft) based in the Netherlands. The faculty has more than 2,000 students, around 350 full time equivalent academic staff and over 8,000 alumni.

== History ==
The first academic education programmes for industrial designers were at the TU Delft Faculty of Architecture. This faculty trained not only architects, but also designers of furniture and everyday utensils. The first students of the 'Technical and Industrial Design' programme started their education with a foundation course in Architecture. In 1969, an independent programme in 'Technical Industrial Design' was established with its own engineering degree. In addition to design, technical subjects played a major role. Ergonomics were also incorporated immediately and furthermore, market research was carried out. Finally, the management side was included in the programme. In 1981, the engineering degree and the interim department was renamed Industrial Design. When the Technical Polytechnic became the Delft University of Technology in 1986, Industrial Design finally became the Faculty of Industrial Design.

== See also ==
- WikID
