= Florence Elizabeth Cory =

American industrial designer

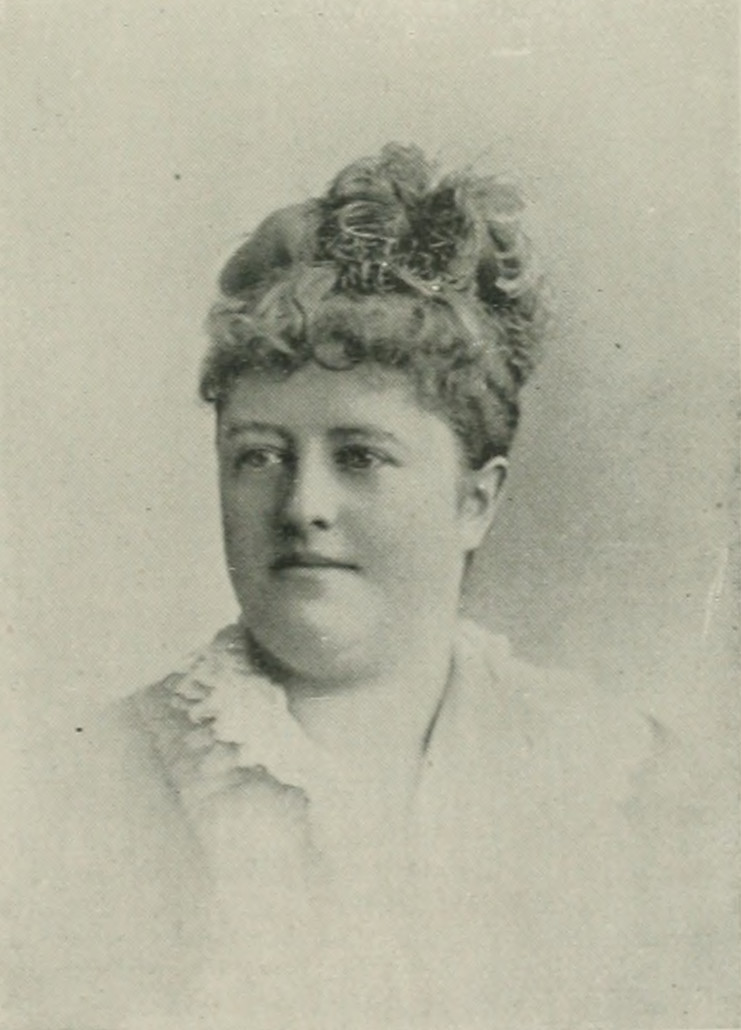
Florence Elizabeth Hall, "A woman of the century"

Florence Elizabeth Cory (June 4, 1851 - March 20, 1902) was an American industrial designer and school founder. She was the first practical woman designer in the United States.

Cory took up designing in 1877, being led to it by the sight of ugly carpets. After a course of theory in Cooper Union, she visited representative factories of the United States, and became familiar with the practical end of the business. She became a designer of wall paper, woolens and silks, as well as carpets. In 1878, Cory taught an afternoon class of 17 women pupils in Cooper Union the art of designing practically for carpets. This was the first class as far as known ever formed to teach practical industrial design to women. In 1880, Cory taught a class of practical design in the Woman's Art Association on Fourteenth Street in New York; and in 1881, she founded the School of Industrial Art and Technical Design for Women, 134 Fifth Avenue, New York.

== Early years and education ==
Florence Elizabeth Hall was born in Syracuse, New York, June 4, 1851. She was a daughter of Johnson L. Hall. She came of American Revolution ancestry and traced her descent back through those on her father's side, who won distinction worthy of historical mention in the War of 1812, and more notedly in the battles of Monmouth and Stony Point in the American Revolutionary War, to General Isaac Hall and to Col. Harry Hall. Her education was of that sort so commonly sufficient for the average society girl, but wholly inadequate to meet her great desire of becoming independent.

== Career ==
At the age of 19, she married Hon. Henry W. Cory, of St. Paul, Minnesota, but in two years, returned with her only child, a girl, to reside with her parents. In spite of the fact that she had loving parents and a home replete with all the comforts and luxuries that money and refinement bring, her longing to do for herself could not be conquered, and she was continually casting about for some occupation in which to find support and, possibly, distinction.

=== Industrial designer ===
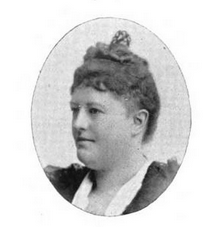
Florence Elizabeth Cory

Cory first wished to become a designer for carpets, having made up her mind to that effect by seeing an ugly carpets and wondering why more beautiful ones were not made. She could find anyone to tell her where she could learn anything of the kind, or even where carpets were made. She looked in the encyclopaedia, but found very unsatisfactory instructions there, telling merely that carpets were made in the United States, but not where they were made or how. During the centennial year, while looking through a pile of papers filled with illustrations of the Centennial exhibits, among others was one of the carpet department at the Centennial Exposition. This drawing was made with divisions; over each division was the name "Yonkers," "Hartford," " Lowell," and so forth. She took the first, which happened to be Hartford, and wrote a letter to the Hartford Carpet Company, asking if designs were in demand, how much was paid for them, how they were made, whether one was restricted in color, and where she could procure the paper on which to make these designs. They were much pleased with the idea of a woman designing. Cory seemed to be the first who had thought of it. Reune Martin, the agent of the Hartford Company, who wrote her, said that as women bought carpets, he thought it a good thing for women to design them, as they would know best what women liked. He sent me as full instructions as he could by letter, five designs to look at, and several sheets of paper. She made three or four designs and sent them to him. They were returned to Cory as being imperfect, but Martin thought with instruction, Cory might be able to please their firm, and advised her attending Cooper Union in New York.

That was in the spring, and she found she could not enter the institute till the autumn. During the summer, she employed her time constantly in studying the structure of fabrics by unraveling them and in making original designs, one of which was accepted by a prominent manufacturer, and she was paid US$15; it was the first money she had earned.

On entering Cooper Union in the fall, she found that her instructors knew the principles of design and could teach them well, but could not at that time teach any practical method of applying those principles to an industrial purpose. She began a course in drawing, of which she felt a great need.

She also made time to visit the carpet departments in the principal stores in New York and finally found the information she wanted, that is, where the carpets were made, and by whom they were made. She found a number of agents in New York, most of them in Worth Street. She went to Worth Street and first called upon William Burrage Kendall, president of the Carpet Trade Association of the United States, and agent of the Bigelow Carpet Company. He was pleased with Cory's idea, and sent her with a note to the head designer at the Higgins Carpet Factory in the city. The head designer offered to give Cory six weeks' free instruction. At that time, she was still a pupil at Cooper Union, and by the time she had taken this practical instruction, Cooper Union thought Cory competent to teach a class.

She subsequently visited the representative factories of nearly every art industry in the United States and thoroughly familiarized herself with the technicalities of design and workings of machinery in each. After spending three years in the West, she returned to New York City and established herself as a practical designer. In a short time, she received more work than she could do.

=== Teacher ===
She became an instructor in Cooper Union in the art she had herself come there to learn but a few months before. She had a class of 17 girls and women, which was the first of the kind ever taught in the United States, and possibly in the world. That position she was obliged to resign on account of ill health.

In 1881, Cory taught a small class at the rooms of the Ladies' Art Association on Fourteenth Street in New York City. At that time, she was not a teacher, nor did not profess or intend to be one. She was a designer, and earned her living in that way. There seemed to be such a demand, so many women who wanted to know how to design, so many who were trying to learn at Cooper Union and other schools, meeting with the same difficulties Cory had encountered, and who, hearing of her, asked Cory to help them. She helped hundreds of women in three or four years, by giving them instructions and hints, teaching them as well as she could until there came so many, she could not attend to her business and decided to found a school, which she did in 1881, classifying the pupils, and confining them to regular hours, so that she had leisure for her other business and to teach besides. By a system of home instruction, Cory taught pupils in every State and Territory in the United States, and several foreign countries.

Cory was a member of the society of the Daughters of the Revolution, of the Daughters of the American Revolution, and of the Daughters of 1812. She was president and treasurer of the School of Industrial Art and Technical Design for Women, at 159 West Twenty-third Street, New York.

== Amputation and death ==
About six weeks before Cory's death, a tiny red spot appeared on one of her fingers. She noticed it first by finding herself dreading to shake hands with anyone. An infection of the fingertip pulp was lanced, but proved more serious after development of gangrene in the right arm. First the finger and then the entire arm were amputated in an effort to save Cory's life. She died in New York City, March 20, 1902, at the Post-Graduate Hospital.
