= Joseph Sinel =

English naturalist and archaeologist (1844–1929)

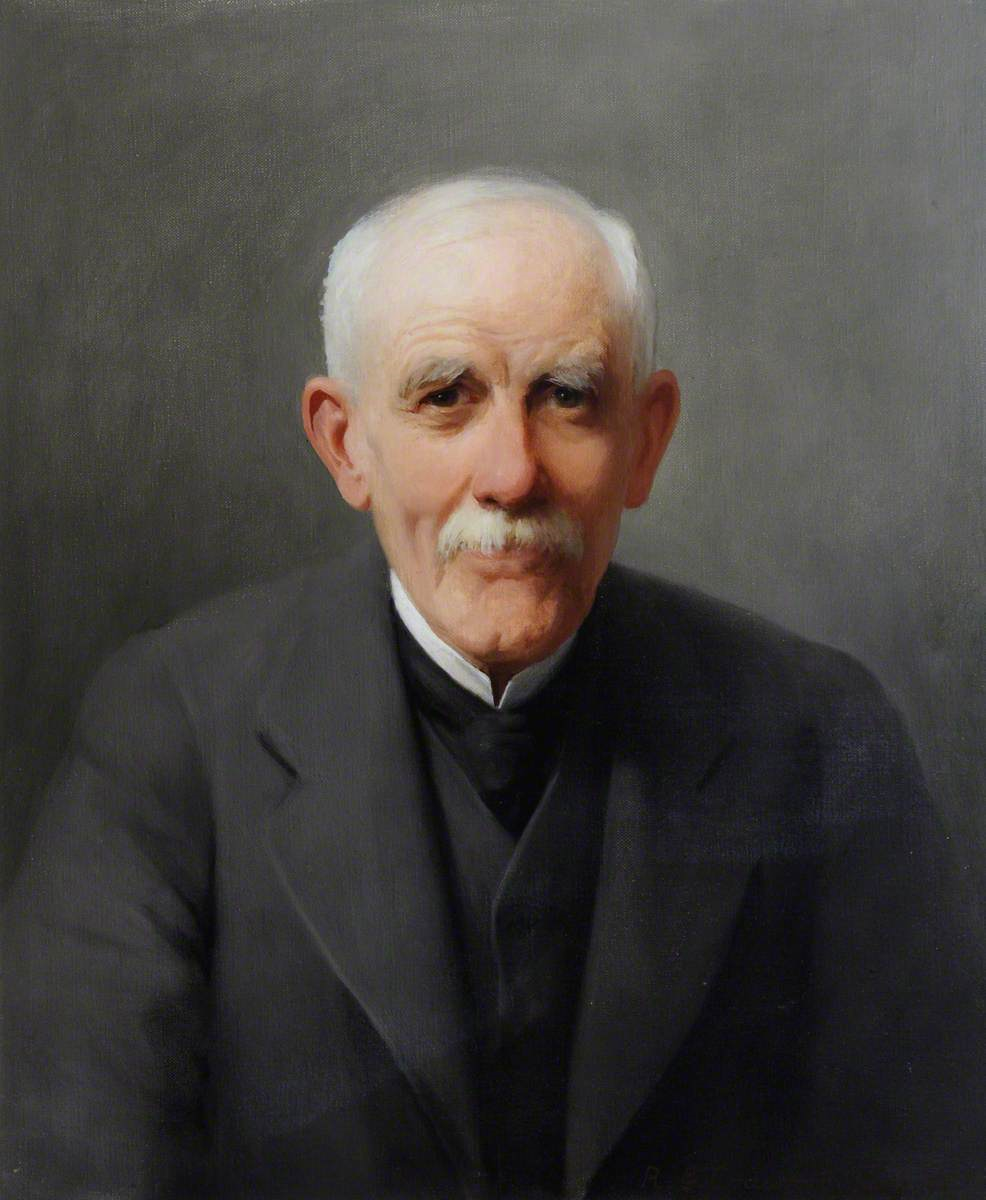
- Born: 13 December 1844
- Died: 2 April 1929 (aged 84)
- Occupations: Naturalist, psychical researcher
- Relatives: Joseph Claude Sinel

Joseph Sinel (13 December 1844 in St Helier, Jersey – 2 April 1929) was a naturalist and archaeologist.

== Early life ==
Sinel was the youngest son of Philip Sinel, a wholesale tobacco merchant, and Charlotte Babot. When fifteen he entered Voisin & Co.’s furniture department, where he eventually became manager. His spare time was spent at low tide amongst the rocks of St Clement’s Bay, where the wealth of marine life in the pools fascinated him. He determined to devote his life to natural science.

== Career ==
Sinel resigned his position at Voisin's, and started business as a taxidermist. He gave a number of lectures to a variety of groups. Papers which he contributed to "Science Gossip" brought him English correspondents, many of whom crossed to Jersey to obtain his help in collecting specimens. Charles Darwin and Alfred Russel Wallace frequently wrote to him about topics of marine zoology. With his son-in-law, James Hornell, he built in 1891 a biological station at Havre Des Pas with aquarium tanks for the study of marine life and the supply of living specimens to students. He attempted to revive the local oyster fisheries. A Jersey Oyster Culture Company was formed and quantities of spat from Auray were placed in cage traps near Green Island, but the site proved insufficiently protected against storms, and the enterprise failed. In 1907 he became curator of the Société Jersiaise Museum, a post which he held until his death. Most of the zoological exhibits were his handiwork.

== Psychical research ==
Sinel was also interested in psychical research. He wrote the book The Sixth Sense (1927), which described his own experiments in telepathy. Sinel stated that he believed psychic phenomena to be result of the pineal body. A review in The Quarterly Review of Biology described it as "an entertaining little book... [but] very weak in spots."

== Publications ==
- The Complete Guide to Jersey (1896)
- The Wonders of Nature 2 volumes (1900)
- Fishes of the Channel Islands (1906)
- An Outline of the Natural History of our Shores (1906)
- Crustacea of the Channel Islands (1906)
- Notes on the Lizards of the Channel Islands (1907)
- The Relative Ages of the Channel Islands (1908)
- The Reptilia, Batrachia, and Mammalia of the Channel Islands, their Origin and Modification by Isolation (1908)
- The Geology of Jersey: With Special Reference to Its Stratigraphy and Relation to the Continental Coast (1912)
- Prehistoric Times and Men of the Channel Islands (1914)
- The Children’s World of Wonders 3 volumes (1924)
- The Sixth Sense: A Physical Explanation of Clairvoyance, Telepathy, Hypnotism, Dreams, and Other Phenomena Usually Considered Occult. Forty Years of Study, Observation and Experiment (1927)

Nature Stories for the Young 3 volumes
