= Maurice Del Mue =

American painter

- Born: 1875; Paris, France
- Died: January 24, 1955 (aged 79–80); Forest Knolls, Marin County, California, U.S.
- Education: San Francisco Art Association; École des Beaux-Arts
- Occupations: Illustrator, poster artist, painter

Maurice Del Mue (1875 – January 24, 1955) was a French-born American illustrator, poster artist, and painter. He worked for the San Francisco Chronicle and Foster & Kleiser, and he had a studio in Forest Knolls, Marin County, California.

== Life ==
Del Mue was born in 1875 in Paris, France, and he immigrated to the United States at age 7. He was trained at the San Francisco Art Association and the École des Beaux-Arts.

Del Mue began his career as an illustrator for the San Francisco Chronicle in the 1920s. He designed posters for Foster & Kleiser until 1941, when he established his studio in Forest Knolls, Marin County, and he joined the Society of Marin Artists. He painted murals at Tamalpais High School, the College of Marin, and the officers' lounge of the Hamilton Army Airfield.

Del Mue died on January 24, 1955, in Forest Knolls, at age 79. One of his paintings is at the Worcester Art Museum.
