= Eller College of Management =

Business school of the University of Arizona

The Eller College of Management
- Motto: "Bear Down, Suit Up"
- Type: Public
- Established: 1913
- Endowment: $37.5 million
- Dean: Karthik Kannan
- Faculty: 130
- Undergraduates: 5,400
- Postgraduates: 700
- Location: Tucson, Arizona, United States; 32.23701°N 110.95439°W
- Campus: Urban, 309.75 acres (1,253,500 m²)
- Mascot: Wildcats
- Website: www.eller.arizona.edu

The Eller College of Management (Eller) is a business school at the University of Arizona located in Tucson, Arizona. The Eller College of Management began in 1913 as bachelor's degree program in commerce before becoming the University of Arizona School of Business and Public Administration in 1944. In 1999, the school was renamed the Eller College of Management in honor of its primary benefactor Karl Eller, an entrepreneur and alumnus of the University of Arizona. It is one of the largest colleges at the University of Arizona, with over 5,400 undergraduate students and nearly 700 graduate students.

Eller employs over 130 faculty members, and offers programs in Accounting, Economics, Finance, Marketing, Management Information Systems (MIS), Operations Management, Entrepreneurship, Business Administration and Management and Organizations.

Karthik Kannan has been Dean of the college since 2022.

The Karl and Stevie Eller Professional Development Center opened in 2016.

== Rankings ==
The 2024 U.S. News & World Report ranks Eller #53 in Best Business Schools for graduates programs and #56 in Part-Time MBA. The school’s Information systems MBA program is ranked #3.

Forbes magazine ranked the Eller 64th Best Domestic Business Schools in 2017.

In 2009, the Financial Times ranked Eller's MBA program 5th among U.S. public universities, 19th among all U.S. universities, and 41st worldwide in its global rankings. The Entrepreneurship program was ranked 3rd worldwide in the Financial Times.

The MBA program was also ranked 24th by The Wall Street Journal's 2005 Interactive Regional Ranking.

== Notable alumni ==
- Karl Eller – Arizona business leader and nationally recognized entrepreneur, was inducted into the Advertising Hall of Fame by the American Advertising Federation in March 2004 in New York City. Eller is also the namesake of the Eller College of Management.
- Jim Furyk – professional golfer
- Terry Lundgren – CEO/Chairman of the Board/President/Director at Federated Department Stores, Inc., the parent company of Macy's and Bloomingdale's department stores
- Arturo Moreno – Owner of the Los Angeles Angels of Anaheim Major League Baseball team, outdoor advertising entrepreneur
- Robert Sarver – Director, SkyWest Airlines and Meritage Corporation.
- Thomas Kalinske – former President, Knowledge Universe; former Chairman, LeapFrog Enterprises

== See also ==
- Economic and Business Research Center
- List of United States business school rankings
- List of business schools in the United States
