= Foster & Kleiser =

Defunct American advertising company

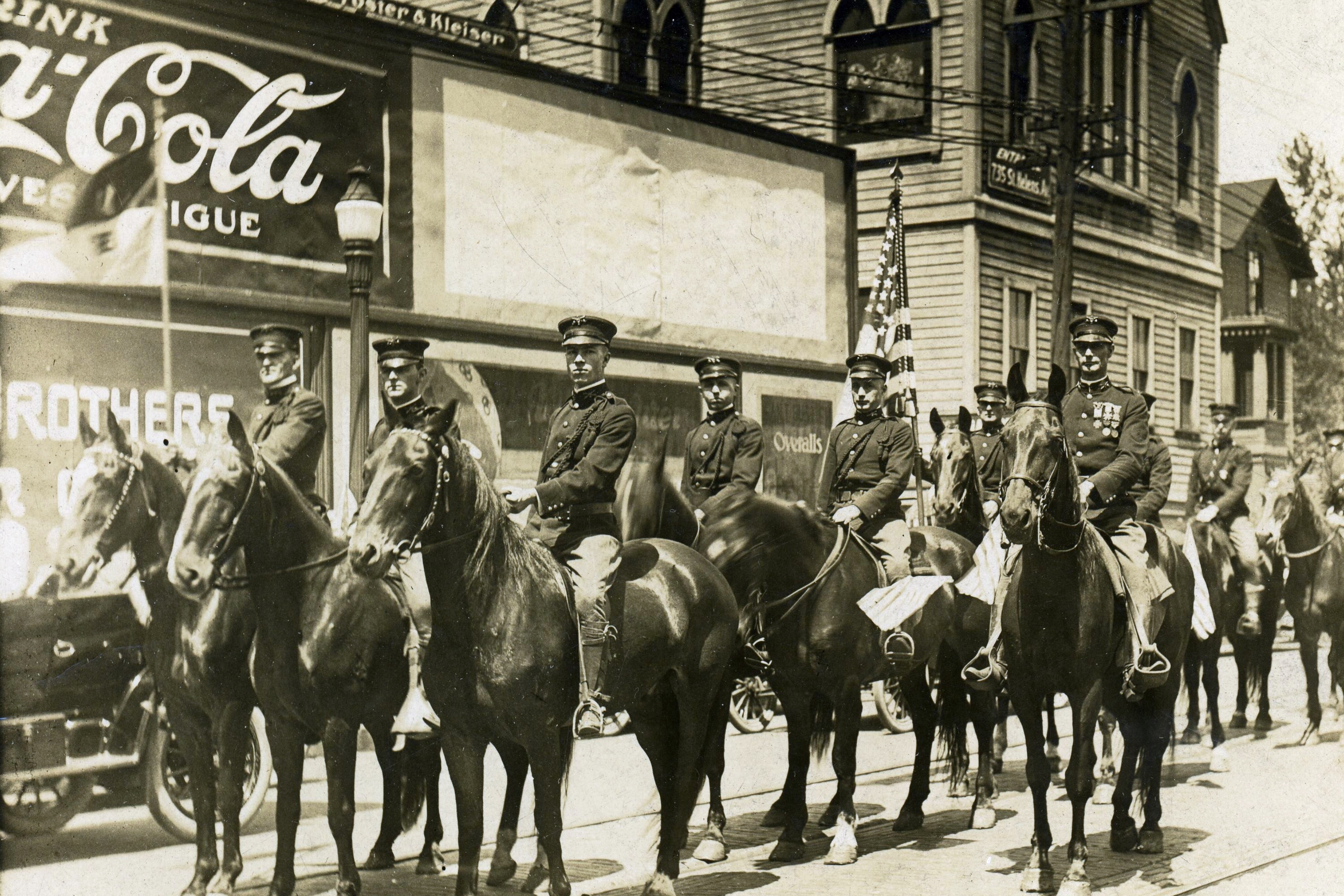
A Foster & Kleiser billboard for Coca-Cola pictured in 1907 in Tacoma, Washington

Foster & Kleiser was an American advertising company founded in 1901 that grew into the "west coast's leading billboard company". Among its notable employees was Maynard Dixon who credited his five years spent as a billboard painter at the company with helping prepare him as a muralist. Another notable employee was Maurice Del Mue. In the 1970s, many of the iconic billboards advertising new rock acts on Los Angeles' Sunset Strip were hand-painted by Foster & Kleiser artists, who worked from a "space the size of an airplane hangar".

In 1952 Foster & Kleiser was purchased by W. R. Grace and Company. Beginning in the 1980s, it would go through a number of name changes, sales, and acquisitions, becoming or being acquired by Metromedia, Patrick Media Group, Ackerley Group, and Eller Media. In 1997, Eller Media was acquired by Clear Channel Outdoor.
