= Industrial design =

Process of design

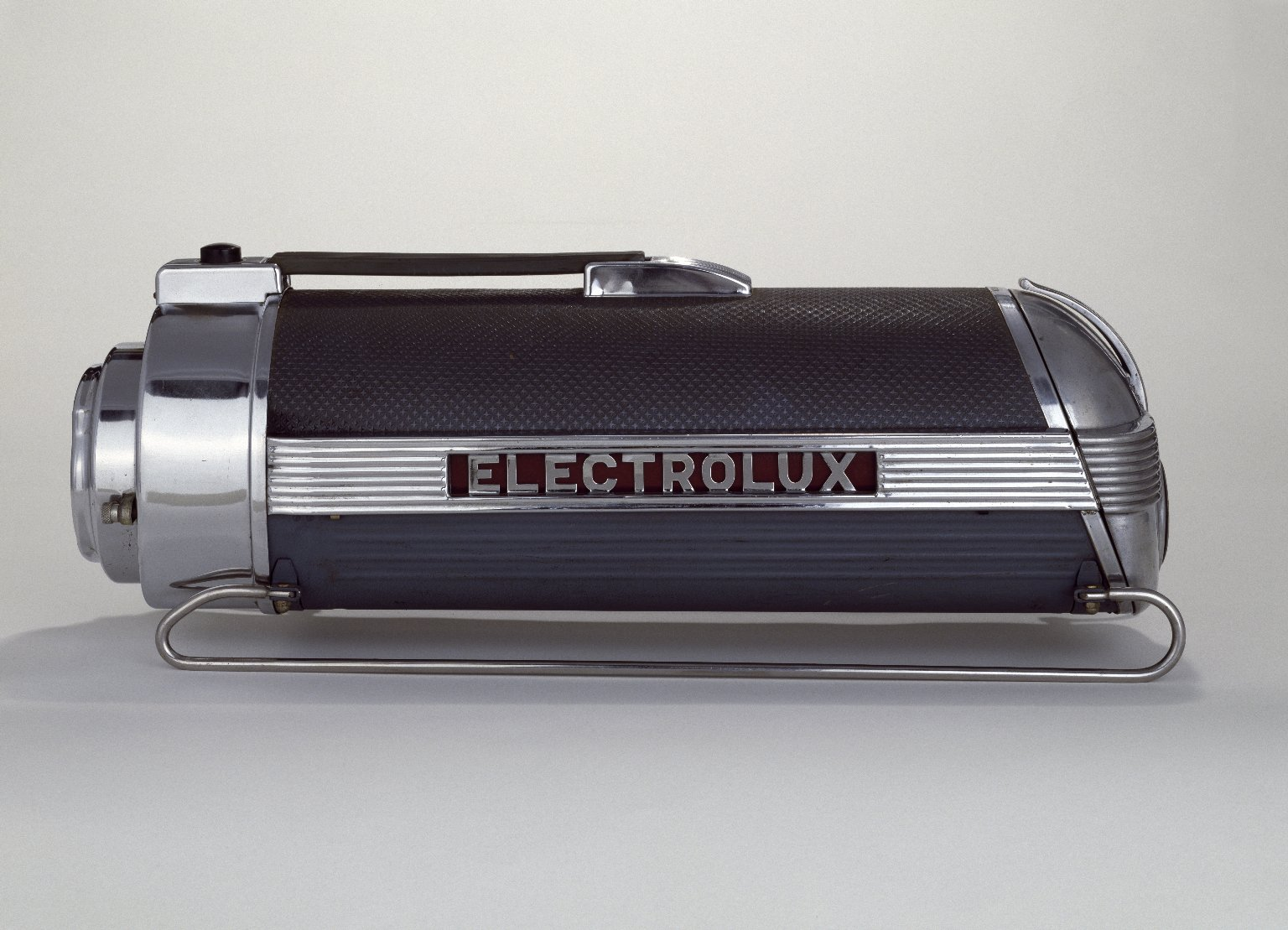
Electrolux vacuum cleaner, designed by Lurelle Guild, c. 1937. Brooklyn Museum

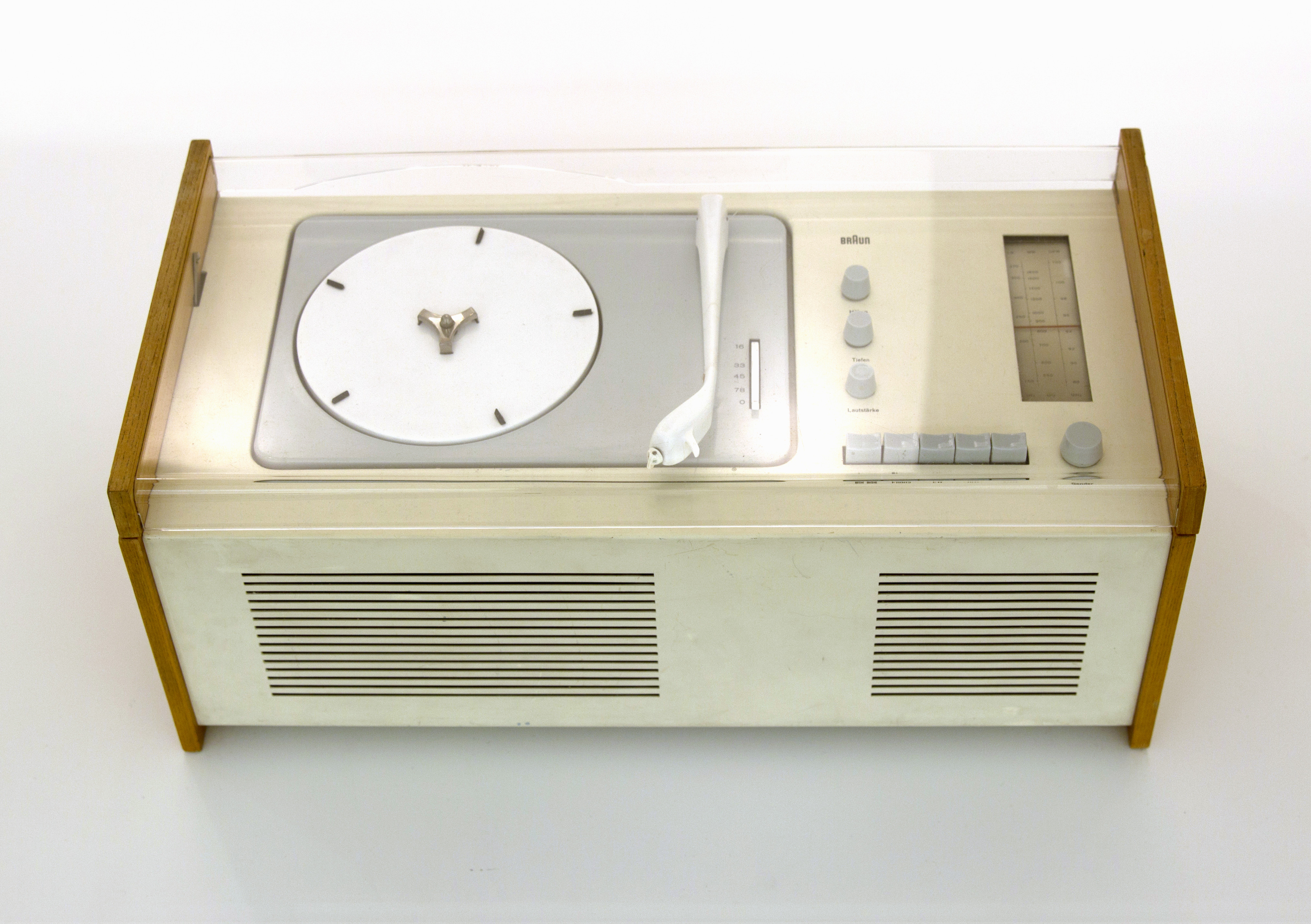
Braun SK 4 radiogram (known as "Snow White's coffin"), designed by Dieter Rams, Herbert Lindinger, and Hans Gugelot, 1956

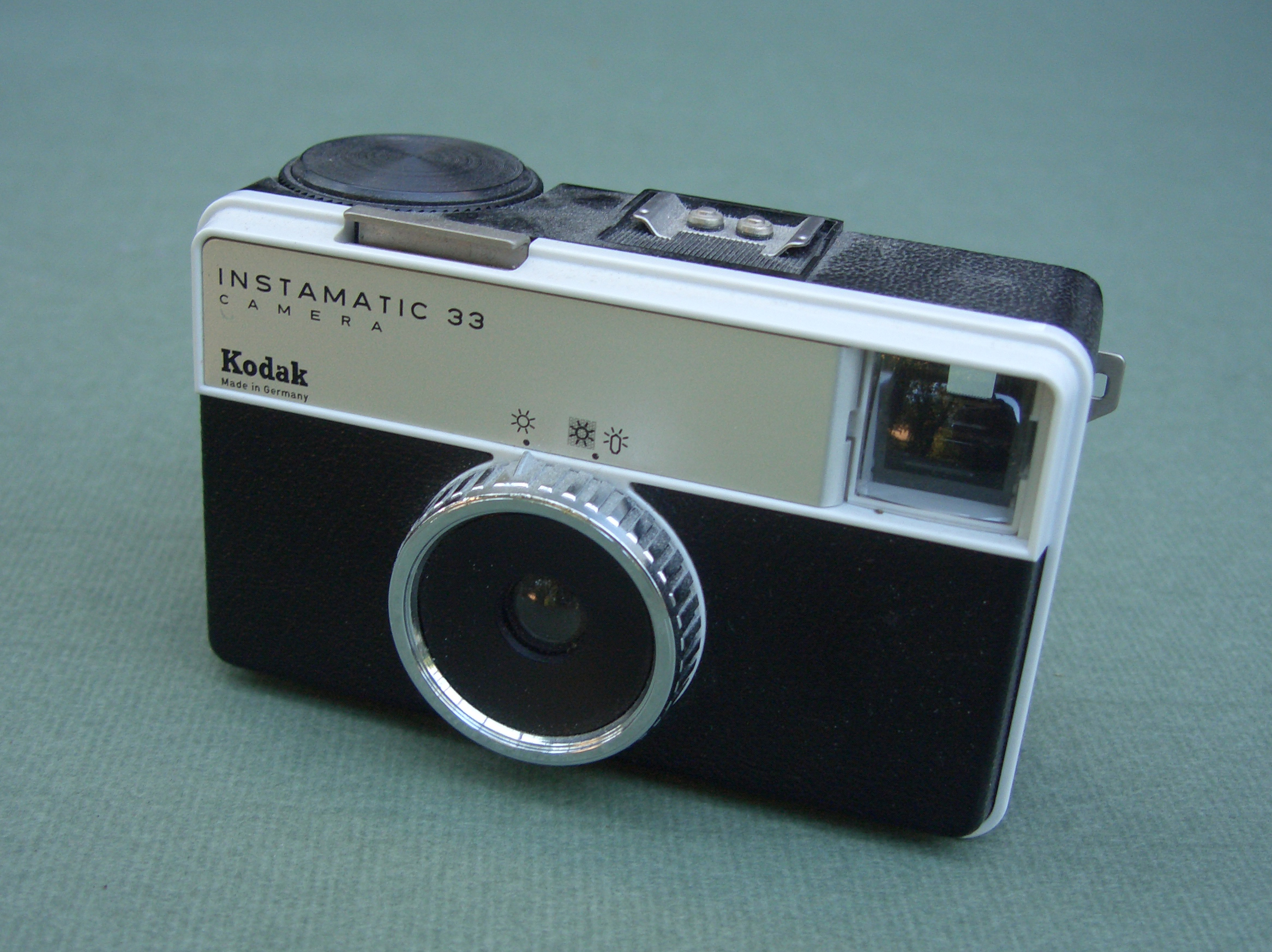
Kodak Instamatic camera, designed by Kenneth Grange, c. 1963

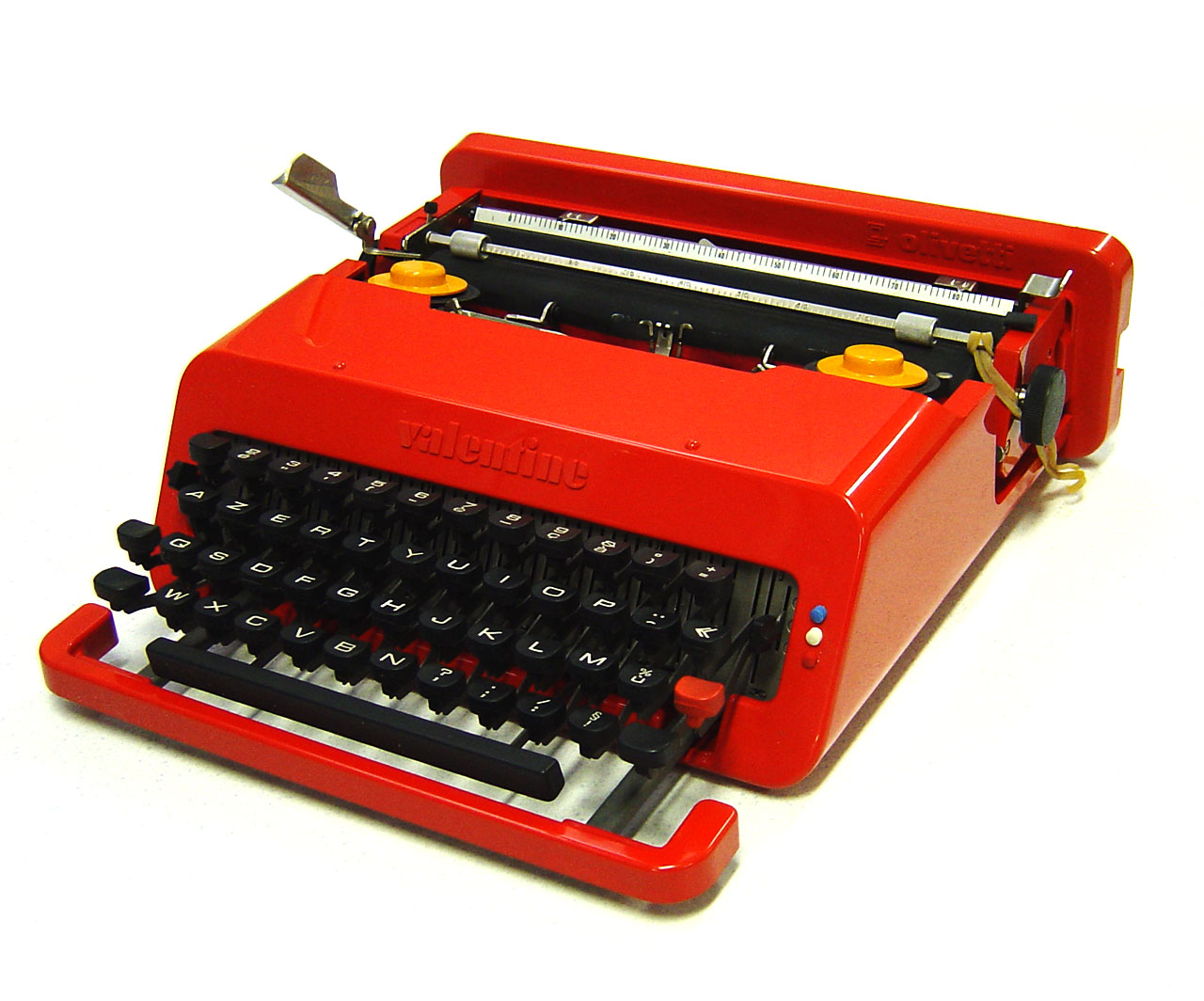
Olivetti Valentine portable typewriter, designed by Ettore Sottsass, 1969

Industrial design (ID) is the process of identifying problems and creating products, systems, and experiences that make everyday activities more efficient or meaningful. It is the creative act of determining and defining a product's form and features, which takes place in advance of the manufacture or production of the product. Industrial manufacture consists of predetermined, standardized and repeated, often automated, acts of replication, while craft-based design is a process or approach in which the form of the product is determined personally by the product's creator largely concurrent with the act of its production.

Industrial design, as an applied art, most often focuses on a combination of aesthetics and user-focused considerations, but also often provides solutions for problems of form, function, physical ergonomics, marketing, brand development, sustainability, and sales.

At its core, industrial design is about understanding people and designing solutions around their needs.

== History ==
=== Precursors ===
For several millennia before the onset of industrialization, design, technical expertise, and manufacturing was often done by individual crafts people, who determined the form of a product at the point of its creation, according to their own manual skill, the requirements of their clients, experience accumulated through their own experimentation, and knowledge passed on to them through training or apprenticeship.

The division of labour that underlies the practice of industrial design did have precedents in the pre-industrial era. The growth of trade in the medieval period led to the emergence of large workshops in cities such as Florence, Venice, Nuremberg, and Bruges, where groups of more specialized craftsmen made objects with common forms through the repetitive duplication of models which defined by their shared training and technique. Competitive pressures in the early 16th century led to the emergence in Italy and Germany of pattern books: collections of engravings illustrating decorative forms and motifs which could be applied to a wide range of products, and whose creation took place in advance of their application. The use of drawing to specify how something was to be constructed later was first developed by architects and shipwrights during the Italian Renaissance.

In the 17th century, the growth of artistic patronage in centralized monarchical states such as France led to large government-operated manufacturing operations epitomized by the Gobelins Manufactory, opened in Paris in 1667 by Louis XIV. Here teams of hundreds of craftsmen, including specialist artists, decorators and engravers, produced sumptuously decorated products ranging from tapestries and furniture to metalwork and coaches, all under the creative supervision of the King's leading artist Charles Le Brun. This pattern of large-scale royal patronage was repeated in the court porcelain factories of the early 18th century, such as the Meissen porcelain workshops established in 1709 by the Grand Duke of Saxony, where patterns from a range of sources, including court goldsmiths, sculptors, and engravers, were used as models for the vessels and figurines for which it became famous. As long as reproduction remained craft-based, however, the form and artistic quality of the product remained in the hands of the individual craftsman, and tended to decline as the scale of production increased.

=== Birth of industrial design ===
The emergence of industrial design is specifically linked to the growth of industrialization and mechanization that began with the Industrial Revolution in Great Britain in the mid 18th century. The rise of industrial manufacture changed the way objects were made, urbanization changed patterns of consumption, the growth of empires broadened tastes and diversified markets, and the emergence of a wider middle class created demand for fashionable styles from a much larger and more heterogeneous population.

The first use of the term "industrial design" is often attributed to the industrial designer Joseph Claude Sinel in 1919 (although he himself denied this in interviews), but the discipline predates 1919 by at least a decade. Christopher Dresser is considered among the first independent industrial designers. Industrial design's origins lie in the industrialization of consumer products. For instance, the Deutscher Werkbund (a precursor to the Bauhaus founded in 1907 by Peter Behrens and others) was a state-sponsored effort to integrate traditional crafts and industrial mass-production techniques, to put Germany on a competitive footing with Great Britain and the United States.

The earliest published use of the term may have been in The Art-Union, 15 September 1840.

Dyce's Report to the Board of Trade, on Foreign Schools of Design for Manufactures.

Mr. Dyce's official visit to France, Prussia, and Bavaria, for the purpose of examining the state of schools of design in those countries, will be fresh in the recollection of our readers. His report on this subject was ordered to be printed some few months since, on the motion of Mr. Hume; and it is the sum and substance of this Report that we are now about to lay before our own especial portion of the reading public.

The school of St. Peter, at Lyons, was founded about 1750, for the instruction of draftsmen employed in preparing patterns for the silk manufacture. It has been much more successful than the Paris school; and having been disorganized by the revolution, was restored by Napoleon and differently constituted, being then erected into an Academy of Fine Art: to which the study of design for silk manufacture was merely attached as a subordinate branch.

It appears that all the students who entered the school commence as if they were intended for artists in the higher sense of the word and are not expected to decide as to whether they will devote themselves to the Fine Arts or to Industrial Design, until they have completed their exercises in drawing and painting of the figure from the antique and from the living model. It is for this reason, and from the fact that artists for industrial purposes are both well-paid and highly considered (as being well-instructed men), that so many individuals in France engage themselves in both pursuits.

The Practical Draughtsman's Book of Industrial Design by Jacques-Eugène Armengaud was printed in 1853. The subtitle of the (translated) work explains, that it wants to offer a "complete course of mechanical, engineering, and architectural drawing." The study of those types of technical drawing, according to Armengaud, belongs to the field of industrial design. This work paved the way for a big expansion in the field of drawing education in France, the United Kingdom, and the United States.

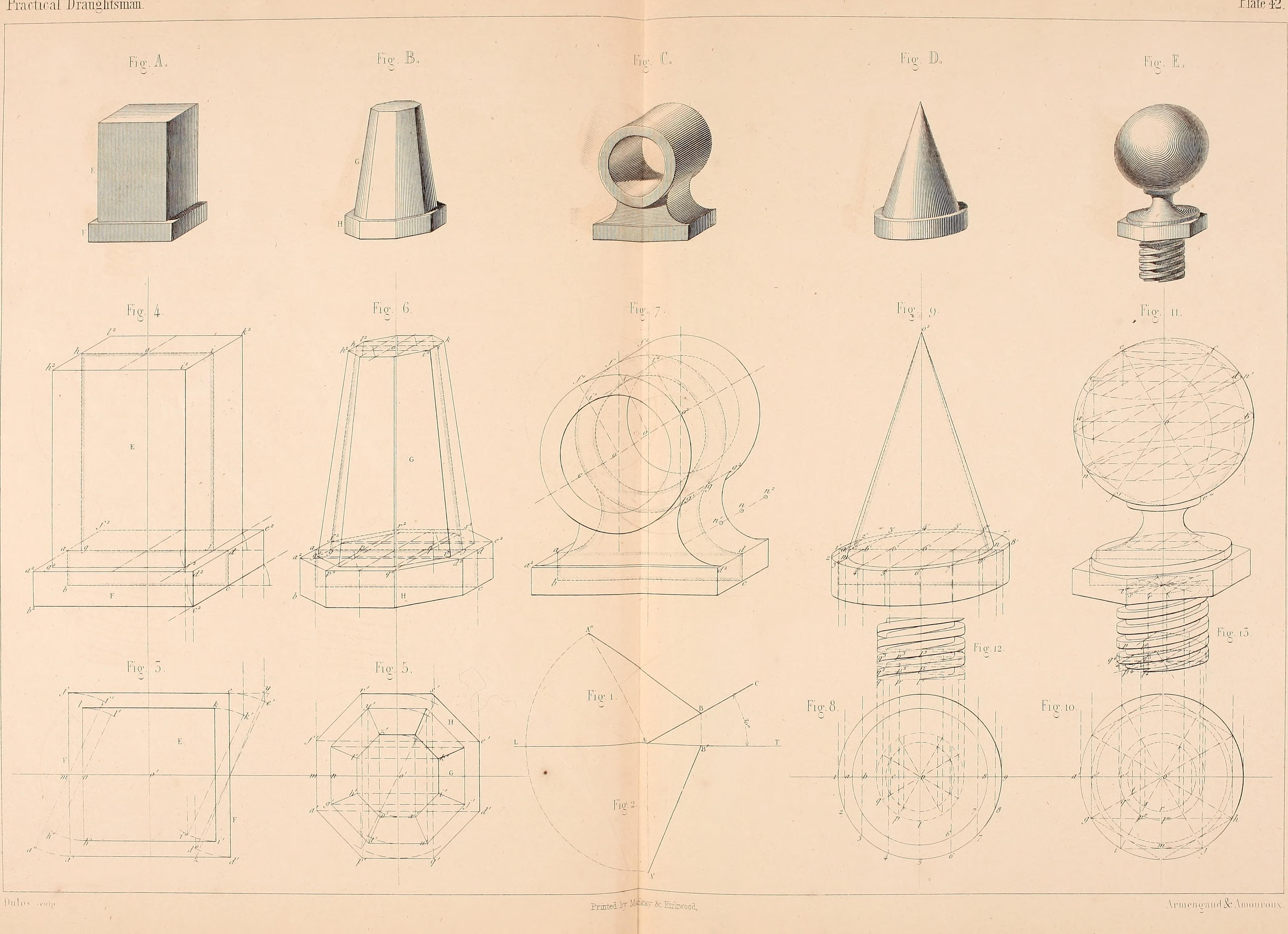
A page from The practical draughtsman's book of industrial design, and machinist's and engineer's drawing companion by Jacques-Eugène Armengaud

== Definition ==
Industrial design (ID) is the professional service of creating and developing concepts and specifications that optimize the function, value and appearance of products and systems for the mutual benefit of both user and manufacturer.

— Industrial Designers Society of America,

Industrial design studies function and form—and the connection between product, user, and environment. Generally, industrial design professionals work in small scale design, rather than overall design of complex systems such as buildings or ships. Industrial designers do not usually design motors, electrical circuits, or gearing that make machines move, but they may affect technical aspects through usability design and form relationships. Usually, they work with other professionals such as engineers who focus on the mechanical and other functional aspects of the product, assuring functionality and manufacturability, and with marketers to identify and fulfill customer needs and expectations.

At the 29th General Assembly in Gwangju, South Korea, 2015, the Professional Practise Committee of the World Design Organization [WDO] unveiled a renewed definition of industrial design as follows: "Industrial Design is a strategic problem-solving process that drives innovation, builds business success and leads to a better quality of life through innovative products, systems, services and experiences." An extended version of this definition is as follows: "Industrial Design is a strategic problem-solving process that drives innovation, builds business success and leads to a better quality of life through innovative products, systems, services and experiences. Industrial Design bridges the gap between what is and what's possible. It is a trans-disciplinary profession that harnesses creativity to resolve problems and co-create solutions with the intent of making a product, system, service, experience or a business, better. At its heart, Industrial Design provides a more optimistic way of looking at the future by reframing problems as opportunities. It links innovation, technology, research, business and customers to provide new value and competitive advantage across economic, social and environmental spheres. " The WDO furthers this extended definition on its website by writing "Industrial Designers place the human in the centre of the process. They acquire a deep understanding of user needs through empathy and apply a pragmatic, user centric problem solving process to design products, systems, services and experiences. They are strategic stakeholders in the innovation process and are uniquely positioned to bridge varied professional disciplines and business interests. They value the economic, social and environmental impact of their work and their contribution towards co-creating a better quality of life."

Previously in 1969, the International Council of Societies of Industrial Design (ICSID), the precursor to WDO, defined Industrial Design as being, "a creative activity the aim of which is to determine the formal qualities of objects produced by industry. These formal qualities include the external features, but are principally those structural and functional relationships which convert a system to a coherent unit both from the viewpoint of the producer and the user. Industrial design embraces all aspects of human environment that are conditioned by industrial production."

== Education ==
Industrial design and product design overlap in the fields of user interface design, information design, and interaction design. Various schools of industrial design may specialize in one of these aspects, ranging from art colleges and design schools (product styling), to mixed programs of engineering and design, to related disciplines such as user experience design.

Industrial design can also overlap significantly with engineering design, and in different countries the boundaries of the two concepts can vary, but in general engineering focuses principally on functionality and utility, whereas industrial design focuses principally on aesthetic and usability aspects of products. In many educational jurisdictions this distinction is effectively defined by credentials and/or licensure required to engage in the practice of engineering.

Except for certain functional areas of overlap between industrial design and engineering design, the former is considered an applied art while the latter is an applied science. Educational programs in the U.S. for engineering require accreditation by the Accreditation Board for Engineering and Technology (ABET) in contrast to programs for industrial design which are accredited by the National Association of Schools of Art and Design (NASAD).

Most industrial designers complete a design or related program at a vocational school or university. Relevant programs include graphic design, interior design, industrial design, architectural technology, and drafting. Diplomas and degrees in industrial design are offered at vocational schools and universities worldwide. Diplomas and degrees take two to four years of study. The study results in a Bachelor of Industrial Design (B.I.D.), Bachelor of Science (B.Sc.) or Bachelor of Fine Arts (B.F.A.). Afterwards, the bachelor programme can be extended to postgraduate degrees such as Master of Design, Master of Fine Arts and others to a Master of Arts or Master of Science.

== Design process ==
All manufactured products are the result of a design process, but the nature of this process can vary. It can be conducted by an individual or a team, and such a team could include people with varied expertise (e.g. designers, engineers, business experts, etc.). It can emphasize intuitive creativity or calculated scientific decision-making, and often encompasses a mix of both. It can be influenced by factors as varied as materials, production processes, business strategy, and prevailing social, commercial, or aesthetic attitudes.

Although the process of design may be considered 'creative', many analytical processes also take place, from initial user research to model making, prototyping and testing. Most industrial designers use various design methods within their creative process. Henry Dreyfuss pioneered an objective and analytical approach in the 1950s, with a focus on 'designing for people', employing ergonomics, anthropometrics and human factors.

Industrial designers often utilize 3D software, computer-aided industrial design and CAD programs to move from concept to production. They may also build a prototype or scaled down sketch models through a 3D printing process or using other materials such as paper, balsa wood, various foams, or clay for modeling.

Product characteristics specified by industrial designers may include the overall form of the object, the location of details with respect to one another, colors, texture, form, and aspects concerning the use of the product. Additionally, they may specify aspects concerning the production process, choice of materials and the way the product is presented to the consumer at the point of sale. The inclusion of industrial designers in a product development process may lead to added value by improving usability, lowering production costs, and developing more appealing products.

== Socio-technical impacts ==
A number of industrial designers are regarded as having made significant impacts on culture, society, technology and daily life through their work. For example, Raymond Loewy was a prolific American designer responsible for the Royal Dutch Shell corporate logo and the original BP logo, the PRR S1 steam locomotive, the Studebaker Starlight automobile, as well as Schick electric razors, Electrolux refrigerators and Le Creuset ovenware, among many other items.

Kenneth Grange was a British designer whose designs also became familiar items in the household or on the street. These designs included the first British parking meters for Venner, kettles and food mixers for Kenwood, razors for Wilkinson Sword, cameras for Kodak, typewriters for Imperial, clothes irons for Morphy Richards, cigarette lighters for Ronson, washing machines for Bendix, pens for Parker, regional Royal Mail postboxes, and the British Rail InterCity 125 High-Speed Train.

Richard Teague, who spent most of his career with the American Motors Corporation, originated the concept of using interchangeable body panels so as to create a wide array of different vehicles using the same stampings. He was responsible for such unique automotive designs as the Pacer, Gremlin, Matador coupe and the Jeep Cherokee.

Dieter Rams is a German industrial designer closely associated with the electrical and electronic consumer products company Braun and the Vitsœ furniture company. Rams was influenced by the Functionalist approach to design and the Ulm School of Design, and is the source of the Ten Principles for Good design.

Many of the Apple company's technically and socially innovative products were designed by Jonathan Ive, who was influenced by the work of Rams. As chief design officer, Ive played a vital role in the designs of products including the Apple Watch, iMac, iPod, iPhone, iPad, MacBook, and the user interface of Apple's mobile operating system iOS.

Other historical socio-technically influential designers included R Buckminster Fuller, Henry Dreyfuss, Eliot Noyes and Charles and Ray Eames.

== Industrial design rights ==
Industrial design rights are a form of intellectual property rights that grant exclusive protection to the visual appearance of products that are not purely utilitarian. For protection purposes, an industrial design consists of the creation of a shape, configuration or composition of pattern or color, or combination of pattern and color in three-dimensional form containing aesthetic value. An industrial design can be a two- or three-dimensional pattern used to produce a product, industrial commodity or handicraft.

== See also ==
- Automotive design
- Design museum
- Engineering design process
- Engineering design
- Experience design
- Hardware interface design
- Human factors and ergonomics
- Industrial Designers Society of America
- Interaction design
- List of industrial designers
- Product design
- Sensory design
- Sustainable design
- Transgenerational design
- WikID
