= Ebonics =

Ebonics may refer to:

- African-American Vernacular English, the variety of English natively spoken by most working-class and middle-class Black Americans, sometimes called Ebonics
- Ebonics (word), a term created in 1973 by a group of African-American scholars who disapproved of the negative terms and stereotypes being used to describe their unique language and manner of speaking
- Ebonics: The True Language of Black Folks, a 1975 book by Robert Williams
- "Ebonics", a song by Big L from the 2000 album The Big Picture
