= Woodrow McClain Parker =

American educator and author

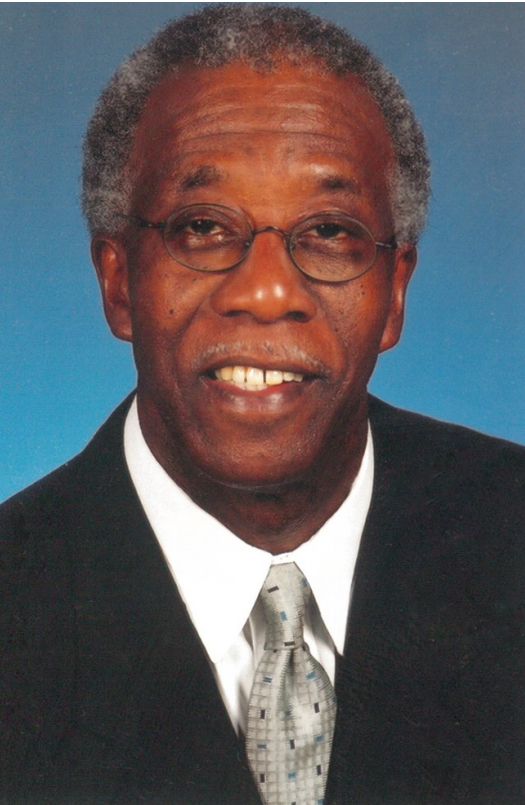
- Born: April 23, 1941 (age 85); Atmore, Alabama. U.S.
- Education: Stillman College (BS); University of South Florida (MS); University of Florida (PhD)
- Occupations: Professor; Mental health counselor; Author

Woodrow McClain "Max" Parker (born April 23, 1941) is an American educator, mental health counselor, and author with a focus on multicultural counseling, training, and consultation. Prior to his retirement in 2016, was a professor of counselor education and as a mental health counselor in the Counseling and Wellness Center at the University of Florida. He provided consultation services on diversity and race relations for schools, colleges, and a variety of community agencies throughout the United States. Parker has authored, co-authored, and contributed to several published works.

== Early life and education ==
Parker was born in the small, rural, and segregated town of Atmore, Alabama on April 23, 1941. His parents were Mark and Nellie Parker and he is the fourth of six children.

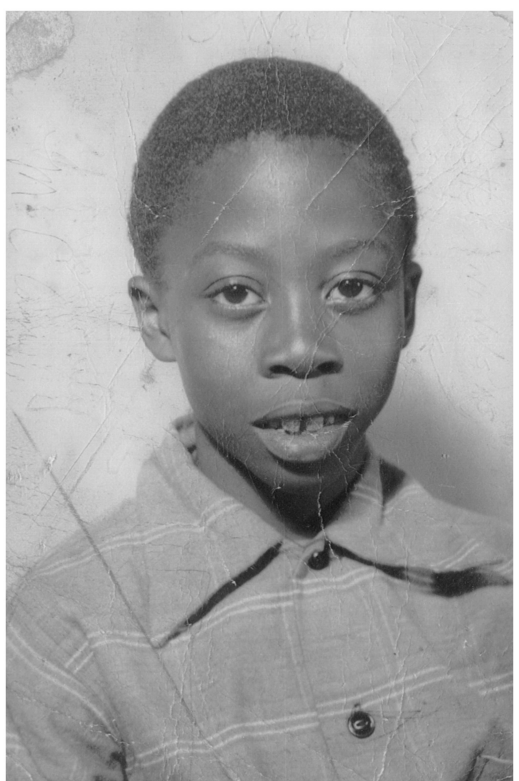
Parker in second grade

Parker attended the Escambia County Training School from the first through the twelfth grade. As a teenager, Parker labored as a migrant worker. He picked cotton, harvested potatoes, and cut corn to earn money to buy clothes and to help his family with basic necessities.

Parker received his Bachelor of Science degree in English from Stillman College in Tuscaloosa, Alabama. He furthered his education with a Master of Science degree in Counselor Education from the University of South Florida in 1971 and earned a PhD in Counselor Education and Mental Health from the University of Florida in 1975.

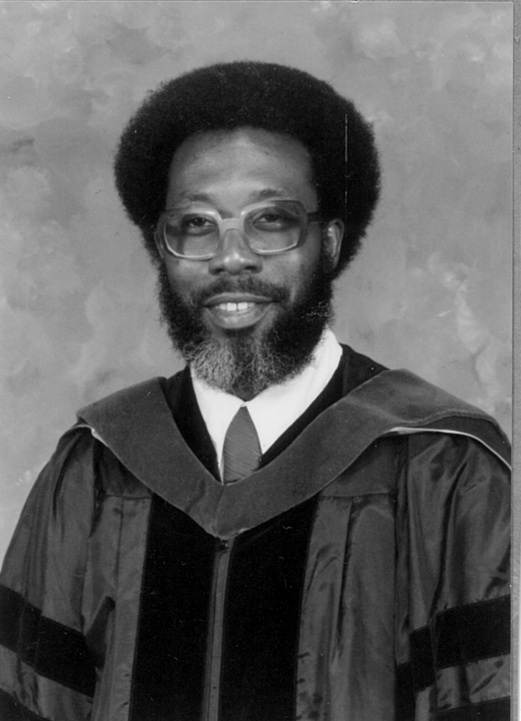
Parker at Doctoral graduation

== Career ==
Parker worked as a professor in the Counselor Education Department at the University of Florida for 19 years and as a mental health counselor in the student health care center. He has disseminated his research findings in numerous books and journals and received the "Most Prolific Contributor Award" for his work published in the Journal of Multicultural Counseling and Development. He has collaborated with various school districts and consulted with various colleges and universities. Parker also conducted group discussions and research in West Africa and Puerto Rico. In 1996, he received two university-wide awards for excellence in teaching and research.

Parker's books include Consciousness-Raising: A Primer for Multicultural Counseling (three editions), Multicultural Relations on Campus: A Personal Growth Approach, Images of Me: A Guide to Group Work with African American Women, and Becoming Multiculturally Responsible on Campus: From Awareness to Action. His memoir, The Real Education of Sweet Papa T, and The Mask Wearing Journey of Sweet Papa T, inspired by Paul Laurence Dunbar's poem "We Wear the Mask."

Parker was awarded the 2010 Lifetime Achievement Award, presented by the University of Florida College of Education and the Lifetime Service Award to the counseling profession from the Florida Counseling Association.

== Personal life ==
Parker is married to Sylvia Brandon Parker. He is an avid cyclist and has trained and completed the New York, Boston, Marine Corps, and Ocala Marathons.

== Awards and honors ==
- Named the "Most Prolific Contributor" to the AMCD Journal (1982 – 1987)
- Presented the Lifetime Achievement Award by the University of Florida, College of Education (2010)
- Inducted into the Atmore Area Hall of Fame for Educational Achievement (2011)
- Florida Association for Multicultural Counseling and Development (FAMCD) established the Max Parker Award for Multicultural Excellence (2013)

== Bibliography ==
=== Books (authored) ===
- Consciousness-Raising: A Primer for Multicultural Counseling (Charles C Thomas Pub Ltd; third edition, 2006) ISBN 9780398076801
- The Real Education of Sweet Papa T, a memoir by Woodrow "Max" Parker (Bookends Press, 2017) ISBN 9781938315671
- The Mask Wearing Journey of Sweet Papa T: Why African American Men Hide Their Feelings (Bookends Press/Renaissance Printing, 2021) ISBN 9781953166098

=== Books (co-authored) ===
- Multicultural Relations on Campus: A Personal Growth Approach, (Routledge 1992) ISBN 9781559590334
- Images of Me: A Guide to Group Work with African American Women, (Allyn & Bacon; 1997) ISBN 9780205171842
- Becoming Multiculturally Responsible on Campus: From Awareness to Action (Cengage Learning; 2007) ISBN 9780618492947
