= Horace Mitchell (academic) =

African American academic administrator

- Born: October 4, 1944 (age 82); Lambert, Mississippi, U.S.
- Occupations: Academic administrator and professor
- Title: President, vice chancellor, associate dean, assistant dean, assistant professor

Academic background
- Education: Washington University in St. Louis, B.A. 1968, M.A. 1972, Ph.D. 1974
- Doctoral advisor: Robert L. Williams

Academic work
- Discipline: Psychology
- Sub-discipline: Counseling psychology
- Institutions: Washington University in St. Louis; University of California, Irvine; University of California, Berkeley; California State University, Bakersfield

Horace Mitchell (born October 4, 1944) is an African-American academic administrator and psychologist. He was the 4th president of California State University, Bakersfield.

== Early life ==
Mitchell was born in Lambert, Mississippi. His parents were Laura Bell (née Shannon) and Lewis M. Mitchell. Until he was ten, he lived in Clarksdale, Mississippi where his father was stationed with the United States Army. His family moved to St. Louis, Missouri, after violent racial attacks on African Americans in Mississippi.

Mitchell attended Washington University in St. Louis, earning a bachelor’s degree in psychology in 1968, a Master of Arts in psychology in 1972, and a Ph.D. in counseling psychology in 1974. He conducted his doctoral research under Robert L. Williams.

== Career ==
In 1968, Mitchell started his career in academia as the assistant dean of the College of Arts and Sciences at Washington University in St. Louis. He continued working at Washington University as an assistant professor of education and Black studies from 1973 to 1978, and as chair of the Black Studies Program from July 1, 1976 to 1978.

In 1975, Mitchell ran for a position on the Normandy Board of Education. Although he was not elected, he was appointed to fill a board vacancy in July 1976. He was also president of the St. Louis Association of Black Psychologists.

Mitchell became a faculty member and special assistant to the vice chancellor of student affairs at the University of California, Irvine in 1978. He was promoted to associate dean for student and curricular affairs in the University of California at Irvine College of Medicine from 1980 to January 30, 1984. Mitchell was the vice chancellor of student affairs and campus life and an associate clinical professor of psychiatry and human behavior.at the University of California, Irvine from January 31, 1984 to 1995.

He became the vice chancellor for business and administrative services at the University of California, Berkeley in 1995. In this position, he oversaw athletics, business operations, campus police, and human resources. Mitchell also taught in the African American Studies department at the University of California, Berkeley from 1996 to 2004.

Mitchell became the 4th president of California State University, Bakersfield on July 15, 2004. Under his leadership, the university increased enrollment by 35 percent, improved graduation rates, added buildings, and joined NCAA Division 1 athletics. He also oversaw the addition of a department of engineering the university's first independent doctoral program. He retired as president emeritus in June 2018.

Mitchell became a licensed psychologist in California in 1981, and continued to practice after his retirement. He also served on the ELA Advisory Board of UC Berkeley's Center for Studies in Higher Education. During his career, he was a member of the NCAA Board of Governors and the NCAA Division I board of directors, a board member of the American Council on Education, and vice chair of the Western Association of Schools and Colleges. He was also a member of the American Association for Higher Education, the American Council on Education, the American Psychological Association, and the Association of Black Psychologists.

== Honors ==
In 1988, the Orange County Human Relations Commission honored Mitchell for helping raise awareness of the different cultures on the UC Irvine campus and for starting programs such as the annual Martin Luther King Day Jr. celebration. In 2002, Mitchell received the Distinguished Psychologist Award from the Association of Black Psychologists.

When Mitchell left the University of California, Berkeley in 2004, he was awarded the Berkeley Citation; the president of the University of California system made him a Vice Chancellor-Business Affairs Emeritus. The California State Student Association gave him the Robert C. Maxson President of the Year Award in May 2006. In 2008, Washington University in St. Louis presented Mithell with its Distinguished Alumnus Award. The National Association of Student Personnel Administrators Region VI gave Mitchell its President's Award in 2010. In 2016, the American Association of Blacks in Higher Education gave Mitchell the Harold Delaney Exemplary Educational Leadership Award.

Mitchell also received the Business Man of the Year from the Kern County Hispanic Chamber of Commerce and the Lifetime Achievement Award from the Kern County Black Chamber of Commerce. The Farmworker Institute for Education & Leadership Development (FIELD) gave him the Cesar Chavez Lifetime Achievement Award.

== Personal life ==
Mitchell and his wife, Barbara, have three children. She also graduated from Washington University in St. Louis and worked in education for fifty years as a teacher, counselor, social worker, secondary school dean, and adjunct university lecturer. < ref name=":5" />

Mitchell is a member of Phi Beta Sigma fraternity. He served as the president of the Volunteer Center of Orange County and on the Irvine Medical Center board of directors. He was also the vice chair of the Bay Area United Way.

In December 2019, MIthcell had a fall that led to a subdural hematoma; he recovered after surgery.

== Selected publications ==
=== Articles ===
- "The Black Experience in Higher Education". The Counseling Psychologist, vol. 2, no. 1 (1970): 30–36. doi:10.1177/001100007000200110.
- "Counseling Black Students: A Model in Response to the Need for Relevant Counselor Training Programs" . The Counseling Psychologist, vol. 2, no. 4 (1971): 117–122. doi:10.1177/001100007100200414.
- "The Testing Game". with Robert L. Williams. The Negro Educational Review vol. 28, no. 3 (July 1, 1977): 172.
- "What Happened to ABPsi’s Moratorium on Testing: A 1968 to 1977 Reminder". with Robert L. Williams. Journal of Black Psychology, vol. 4, no. 1-2 (1978): 25-42. doi:10.1177/009579847800400104.
- "A Critical Analysis of the Testing Game". Journal of Non-White Concerns in Personnel and Guidance, vol. 6, no. 3 (April 1978): 110–118.
- "Students Are Not Professional Athletes". U.S. News & World Report (January 6, 2014)
- "Horace Mitchell on Entrepreneurial Academics". Business Officer, vol. 49, no. 1 (2015): 24–25.

=== Chapters ===
- "From Segregation in Mississippi to University Leadership in California: Seizing Opportunities, Making a Difference, and Paying It Forward" in Career Journeys of Diverse Leaders in Higher Education. Edited by George Blumenthal, Josefina Castillo Baltodano, and Ding-Jo H. Currie. New York: Routledge, 2024. ISBN 9781003465812.
