= Catherine Emihovich =

American academic (died 2021)

- Born: Buffalo, New York
- Died: August 21, 2021
- Education: Syracuse University; State University of New York at Buffalo (North Campus)
- Years active: 2002–2011
- Known for: Being the 12th dean at the University of Florida College of Education

Catherine Emihovich (died August 21, 2021) was an American academic. She was the former dean and faculty member of the University of Florida College of Education. In May 2002, she was selected as the 12th dean of the college and the first woman to hold that position. Before this position, she was the dean of the College of Education at California State University at Sacramento. She stepped down as dean on August 14, 2011. She took a year's sabbatical before resuming her faculty responsibilities.

Emihovich published several books and helped publish numerous peer-reviewed journals. She presented over 100 papers at key educational conferences.

== Education ==
Emihovich held a Bachelor's degree in speech from Syracuse University, a Master's degree in measurement and statistics from the State University of New York at Buffalo, and a Doctorate in educational psychology from the State University of New York at Buffalo.

== Career ==
After graduating from Syracuse University of New York, Emihovich taught in Buffalo, New York for four years. She returned to school before moving to Columbia in 1982 to be an assistant professor at the University of South Carolina. Five years later, she joined the educational research faculty at Florida State University. She returned to SUNY at Buffalo for six years beginning in 1994 as a professor in the Department of Counseling and Educational Psychology before she was picked to be dean at California State University at Sacramento.

=== University of Florida ===
In May 2002, Emihovich was appointed as the dean of University of Florida College of Education. During her time at the University of Florida, she worked to make the University a national leader in effective education reform.

In 2004, she established the UF online learning program. The program experienced meteoric growth, having nearly 4,400 enrollments with 130 courses in 2010.

In 2006, she spearheaded the creation of an interdisciplinary Center for Excellence in Early Childhood Studies (Formerly the Anita Zucker Center). This helped to secure the college's $1.5 million David Lawrence Jr. Endowed Professorship in Early Childhood Studies.

In 2008, she established UF Teach, which offered a different method of recruiting mathematics and science majors into teaching positions due to a national shortage. In the same year she was appointed president of the Holmes Partnership, a consortium of local and national educational bodies "dedicated to equitable education and reform in teaching and learning".

She also initiated remodels for several areas of Old and New Norman, and improved the UF IT department, which were paid for through five million dollars obtained from fundraising. With the extra space, she established DE and Lastinger Center office spaces. the REM/OER complex, the Center for Excellence in Early Childhood Studies, space for faculty research commons, and the staff lounge

=== Research ===
Throughout her career, Emihovich was known for her many research papers. Growing up in a segregated neighborhood, she was interested in research on race in education at an early age.

== Awards and honors ==
Emihovich was named a fellow of the Society for Applied Anthropology in 2013.

== Selected publications ==
Throughout her career, Emihovich wrote many academic books and texts. She was a past editor of Anthropology and Education Quarterly.

=== Books ===
- Emihovich, Catherine, ed. (January 1, 1989). Locating Learning: Ethnographic Perspectives on Classroom Research.
- Emihovich, Catherine, ed. (July 31, 1997). Sex, Kids, and Politics: Health Services in Schools.
- Emihovich, Catherine, ed. (December 2, 1997). Transforming Schools and Schools of Education: Techniques for Collaboration and School Change.

== Personal life ==
Emihovich was diagnosed with brain cancer in mid-2019 and died on August 21, 2021.

Preceded by Dr. Ben F. Nelms	Dean of University of Florida College of Education; 2002 – 2011	Succeeded by Glenn E. Good
