= Robert Williams (psychologist) =

American psychology professor (1930–2020)

Robert Lee Williams
- Born: February 20, 1930; Little Rock, Arkansas, U.S.
- Died: August 12, 2020 (aged 90); St. Louis, Missouri, U.S.
- Education: Philander Smith College; Wayne State University; Washington University in St. Louis
- Known for: Black Intelligence Test of Cultural Homogeneity "Ebonics"
- Scientific career
- Fields: Psychology
- Workplaces: Washington University in St. Louis; National Institute of Mental Health; Association of Black Psychologists
- Doctoral students: Horace Mitchell

Robert Lee Williams II (February 20, 1930 – August 12, 2020) was a professor emeritus of psychology and African and Afro-American studies at the Washington University in St. Louis and a prominent figure in the history of African-American psychology. He founded the department of Black Studies at Washington University and served as its first director, developing a curriculum that would serve as a model throughout the country. Williams was well known as a stalwart critic of racial and cultural biases in IQ testing, coining the word "Ebonics" in 1973 and developing the Black Intelligence Test of Cultural Homogeneity. He published more than sixty professional articles and several books. He was a founding member of the Association of Black Psychologists and served as its second president.

== Early life and education ==
Robert Lee Williams was born in Biscoe, Arkansas, on February 20, 1930, during the Jim Crow Era. His parents received no formal education whatsoever. His father, Robert L. Williams, worked as a millwright and died when his son was just five years old. Williams' mother, Rosie L. Williams, worked in the homes of white families until her death in 1978. Williams credited his mother as a central figure in his intellectual pursuits after she instilled the importance of education in him from an early age. He had one sister, Dorothy Jean.

He graduated from Dunbar High School in Little Rock at sixteen before attending Dunbar Junior College. However, he only attended Dunbar for one year, as he dropped out after being discouraged by an IQ test. After receiving a lower than expected score which recommended a career in manual labor rather than going to college, Williams later reported feeling that he "lost [his] confidence for a long time". This would become a defining moment in his life because it clearly inspired some of Williams' most notable future work, namely the Black Intelligence Test of Cultural Homogeneity or BITCH-100. Williams earned a BA degree (cum laude with distinction in the field), from Philander Smith University, in 1953. He earned a M.Ed. from Wayne State University in educational psychology in 1955, at a time when all graduate programs in the South remained segregated, and a Ph.D. in 1961 from Washington University in St. Louis in clinical psychology.

== Career ==
=== Early career ===
Williams worked as a staff psychologist at Arkansas State Hospital starting in 1955, the first African-American psychologist to be hired at a state mental health facility in Arkansas. After earning his doctorate in 1961, he served as an associate chief psychologist at the Jefferson Barracks Veterans Affairs Hospital in St. Louis, Missouri from 1961 to 1966, and then as director of a hospital improvement project in Spokane, Washington, and a consultant for the National Institute of Mental Health.

=== Founding of the Association of Black Psychologists ===
In 1968 he was a founding member of the Association of Black Psychologists (ABP) and served as its second president. The ABP was established as a response to the American Psychological Association (APA) due to backlash at what was perceived by some psychologists as the APA's conscious and unconscious support for the racist nature of American society. A central ethos of the ABP was that members understood that they were "Black people first and psychologists second". The focus of Black psychology for Williams was to "be about the business of setting forth new definitions, conceptual models, test theories, normative behavior, all of which must come from the heart of the Black experience". While serving as President of the Association of Black Psychologists (1969-1970), Williams created The 10 Point Plan and mailed it to 300 colleges and universities. This plan was instrumental in recruiting and sustaining Black graduate students in Masters and Ph.D. psychology programs throughout the United States.

=== Academia ===
From 1970 to 1992, he served as a professor of psychology and African and African-American Studies at Washington University in St. Louis. He founded the department of Black Studies in Arts and Sciences at Washington University in St. Louis and served as its first director, ultimately developing a curriculum that would serve as a model throughout the country. As chair of the Black Studies department, Williams proactively substantiated and grew the program through a series of actions, instituting honors, awards and integrating the program with various college organizations. Under Williams' leadership, the department also offered opportunities for international travel and scholarship. Furthermore, he established an Institute for Black Studies and subsequently conducted his own research alongside students. Williams' associates in the field described him as highly respected, strong, and compassionate. He was considered a pillar of the national black psychology community, inspiring young black students to pursue their academic goals, especially at Washington University, the predominantly white institution where he held tenure. After his retirement from Washington University, Williams worked at the University of Missouri in Columbia as a visiting professor from 2001 to 2004, becoming the interim director of Black studies from the years 2002–2003. Williams wrote over 60 scholarly papers throughout his career on topics across psychology and black studies. In 2014, Washington University honored his legacy with a conference regarding the importance of maintaining diversity within academia. In 2017, he received a Legacy Award at the university's Trailblazers recognition ceremony.

== Black Intelligence Test of Cultural Homogeneity (The Black Test) ==
Dr. Williams was an early critic of racial bias within standardized testing and theorized that Whites tended to score higher on tests than African Americans due to bias towards Whites built into the tests. Williams's theory led to him constructing his own standardized test, the Black Intelligence Test of Cultural Homogeneity or BITCH-100, which he predicted would result in higher testing scores for African Americans. The test was created by drawing from a glossary of African-American speech and personal experience. The Black Intelligence Test of Cultural Homogeneity consisted of 100 questions initially titled "Danger: Testing and De-humanizing Black Children." Though structured similarly to traditional IQ testing, European Americans scored consistently lower on the BITCH than African Americans. Williams did not conclude, as had white psychologists, that this discrepancy in outcomes proved the intellectual inferiority of European Americans.

His theories overlapped with other contemporary arguments on the subject. For example, the NAACP backed a 1977 lawsuit in San Francisco to stop black students from being classified as "mentally retarded" on the basis of traditional standardized test scores. Williams provided expert witness testimony in this case. Explaining his perspective on IQ tests in relation to his own children's learning, Williams stated, "My kids need education, not testing. If they are tested, the tests should help us understand what their educational needs are." Williams received some backlash for his IQ testing theories, with critics arguing that he was attempting to lower standards for black students. He once even received a threatening letter stating that the FBI had "proof" that he was a communist. Williams' refuted his critics by declaring that traditional IQ tests often result in "death sentences" that black children acquire early and are stuck with the rest of their lives. Williams asserted that "When [he] did well in school, administrators would say [his] below-normal test results were a fluke," and claimed, "that the standard IQ test is not an adequate measure of black students' abilities, of their capacity to profit from further experience or of what they're going to do in the future."

== Coining the term Ebonics ==
On January 26, 1973, Williams' created the term "Ebonics" (a combination of "ebony" and "phonics") to refer to African-American English at a conference called "The Cognitive and Language Development of Black Children," which he organized in St. Louis in 1973. Williams defined Ebonics as "linguistic and paralinguistic features which on a concentric continuum represent the communicative competence of the West African, Caribbean, and United States slave descendants of African origin." He formally outlined his linguistic theory in his 1975 book, Ebonics: The True Language of Black Folks, which explained the African roots of Ebonics and refuted the popular conception that Ebonics was simply slang or deficient English.

=== Implications of Ebonics ===
Williams' work on Ebonics catapulted him into the public spotlight, especially after Ebonics became recognized as an official language for 28,000 African-American students in the school district of Oakland, California, on December 18, 1996. Ebonics has long remained a popular topic of contention, with several linguists questioning the accuracy of Williams' work and others arguing that the Williams theory of Ebonics harms black children by lowering their academic achievement standards.

== Black Personality Theory ==
Williams formulated his "Black Personality Theory," presented in his second book, The Collective Mind: Toward an Afrocentric Theory of Black Personality. His theory argued that black personality could not be understood using European philosophy and values. Instead, the Black Personality Theory would draw on an African philosophy of collectiveness diametrically opposed to Western individualism. He described how many white children came to be indoctrinated to embrace racist tendencies through "racial scripting" that promoted misguided myths regarding racial superiority or inferiority.

== Racial scripting ==
In his book, "Racism Learned at an Early Age Through Racial Scripting," Williams argues that white children acquire racist predispositions at a young age through the process of "racial scripting," and these scripts are taught to children by parents, schools, religious groups, etc. Williams defines racial scripts as "myths and stereotypes individuals form about ethnic and racial groups to which they do not belong." Racial scripts received in childhood can shape adult perceptions, claimed Williams. In his book, Williams identifies several myths and stereotypes that form these racial scripts. Including the myth of black genetic deficiency, the deteriorating black family, cultural deprivation, black language deficiency, black self-hatred, damaged black psyche, the superior sexual stud, the superior black athlete, and the lazy Negro. He argues that racial scripts form a racial schema that individuals draw upon to understand situations and that these scripts can be positive, negative, or neutral.

== Popular exposure ==
Williams appeared in the public eye on numerous occasions, including television appearances with Dan Rather, Phil Donahue, and Montel Williams. His work has been cited by many major newspapers, and served as a theme for an episode of Good Times.

== Personal life ==
Williams was 18 years old when he married Ava L. Kemp in 1948. They had eight children, 19 grandchildren, 19 great-grandchildren, and two great-great-grandchildren. All eight of Williams's children attended Washington University. Four of his children became psychologists while his other children became a nurse, a journalist, a teacher, and a leather craftswoman, respectively. Williams' wife of nearly 70 years, Ava Lee (Kemp) Williams, died in 2018. Williams died on August 12, 2020, at the age of 90, following a decline in his health.

== Works ==
- Ebonics: The True Language of Black Folks, Institute of Black Studies, (1975)
- The Collective Mind: Toward an Afrocentric Theory of Black Personality (1981)
- "Racism Learned at an Early Age through Racial Scripting" (2007)
- History of the Association of Black Psychologists: Profiles of Outstanding Black Psychologists (2008)

== See also ==
- Cultural psychology
