= Escambia County Training School =

School in Atmore, Alabama, US (1920–1970)

- Interactive map of Escambia County Training School
- 31.03107°N 87.47896°W
- Location: 8th Ave. (now Martin Luther King Jr. Blvd.), Atmore, Escambia County, Alabama, U.S.

History
- Active: 1920–1970

Alabama Register of Landmarks and Heritage
- Designated: June 23, 2016

The Escambia County Training School (ECTS; 1920–1970) was a segregated training school for African-American students in Atmore in Escambia County, Alabama, United States. It was also known as the Atmore Colored School.

The school building was added to the Alabama Register of Landmarks and Heritage on June 23, 2016. It has a historical marker which was erected in 2016 by the Atmore Historical Society.

== History ==
Atmore Colored School was founded in 1920, and the first principal was Robert L. Bradley.

The school was located on 8th Avenue (which is now Martin Luther King Jr. Boulevard), between Broad Street and McGlasker. In 1925, the community raised funds, which along with the Rosenwald Fund provided means to build a six-room wooden building, plus a brick high school building.

The girls basketball team won the state championship in 1951. The boys football team was undefeated in 1959. In 1969 new floors were added.

Around 30 years later, the school was merged with the city school.

== Closure and modern usage ==
The last graduating class was in 1970, after the desegregation of the public schools. The remaining buildings on the site were built in 1959, 1980, and 1981. The site was used for the Escambia County Middle School from 1970 to 2000.

In 2019, the site was the location of a mass shooting at a graduation party.

== Notable alumni ==
- Woodrow McClain Parker, professor emeritus University of Florida
- Ulysses McBride, past president of Bishop State Community College and Reid State Technical College
- Willie J. Parker, educator, coach, and author
