= Black Intelligence Test of Cultural Homogeneity =

Intelligence test created by Robert Williams in 1972

The Black Intelligence Test of Cultural Homogeneity, also known as BITCH-100 or The BITCH Test, is an intelligence test created by Robert Williams in 1972 oriented toward the language, attitudes, and life-styles of African Americans.

== Nature of test ==
The test consisted of a multiple-choice questionnaire in which the examinee was asked to identify the meaning of 100 words as they were then used in black communities. Examples of words used included alley apple, black draught, blood, boogie jugie, and boot.

The original sample used in the experiment consisted of 100 white and 100 black St. Louis high school students, aged 16–18 years old – half of them being from low socioeconomic levels and the other half from middle income levels. Williams also had data from two other samples of blacks and whites. These samples included 25 black and 13 white college students from Mississippi and 19 white graduate students from Boston University. Out of the 200 students who participated in the original sample the 100 black students answered 87/100 answers correctly and the whites answered 51/100 questions correctly. In the other samples the results were similar with the black students' scores being drastically different from those of the whites.

== Interpretation ==
The results of the test showed that the black group performed much better than the white group. White students performed more poorly on this test than blacks, suggesting that there are important dissimilarities in the cultural backgrounds of blacks and whites. The results of these tests and examination of the BITCH-100 confirmed Robert Williams' belief that his intelligence test dealt with content material that was familiar to blacks. However, there exists a restriction of range in the current form of the test thereby limiting its usefulness as an instrument used for selection. Some argue that these findings indicate that test bias plays a role in producing the gaps in IQ test scores.

Both of these tests demonstrate how cultural content on intelligence tests may lead to culturally biased score results. Still, these criticisms of cultural content may not apply to "culture free" tests of intelligence. The BITCH-100 and the Chitling Test both have explicit cultural assumptions, while normal standardized tests are only hypothesized to have implicit bias. The fact that a test can have bias does not necessarily prove that a specific test does have bias. However, even on cultural free tests, test bias may play a role since, due to their cultural backgrounds, some test takers do not have the familiarity with the language and culture of the psychological and educational tests that is implicitly assumed in the assessment procedure.

== In popular culture ==
In 1974 Good Times sitcom episode "The I.Q. Test", the test was referenced by the Evans's daughter, Thelma. She explains the test's significance as the family discusses why the family's activist son, Michael, chose to walk out of his public school's I.Q. test, which he deemed unfairly geared towards white Americans and white culture.

== See also ==
- History of the race and intelligence controversy
