= Norman Gym (Gainesville, Florida) =

Historic building

James W. Norman Gym
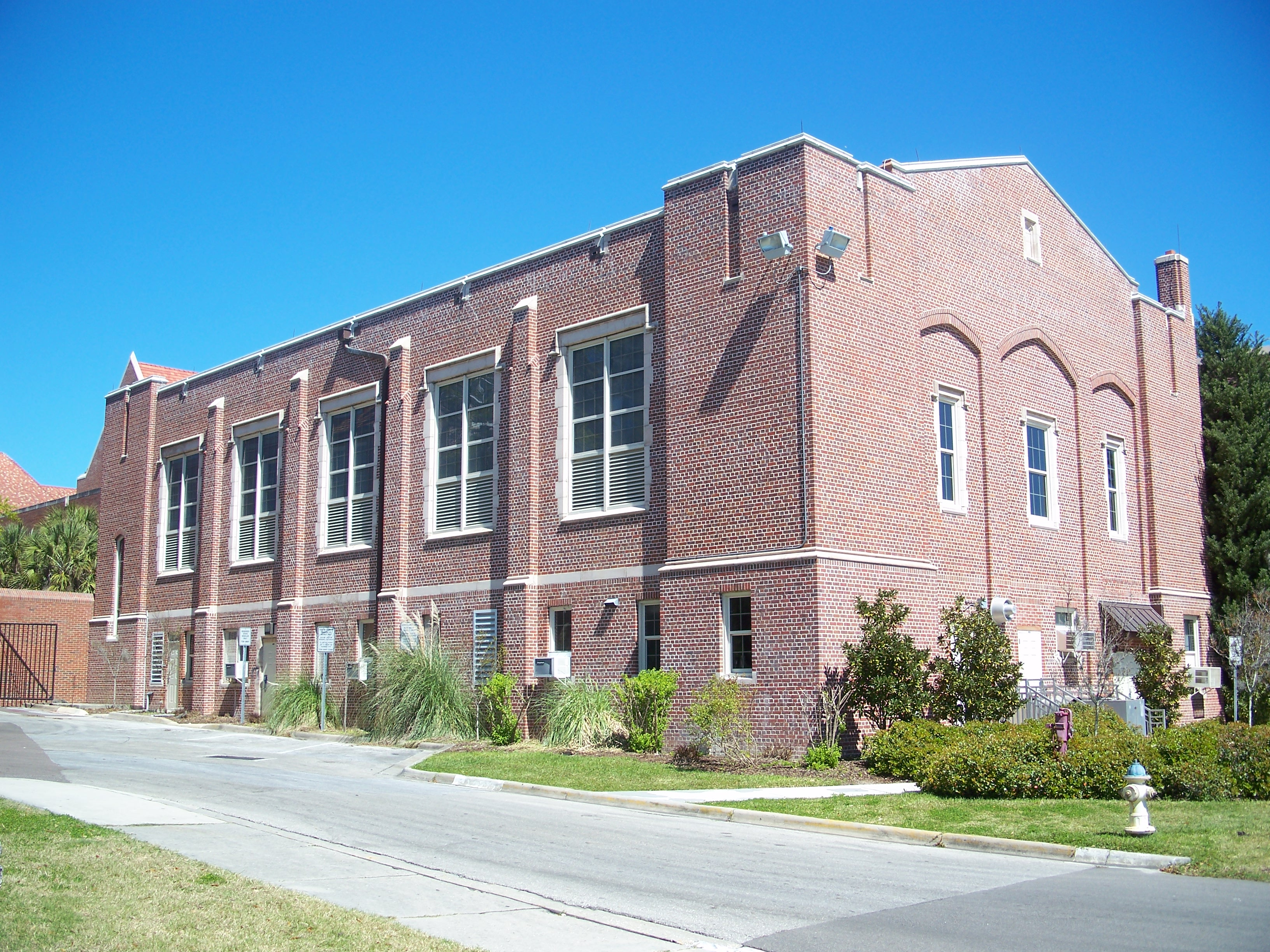
- Norman Gym
- Interactive map of the James W. Norman Gym area

General information
- Type: Recreational
- Location: Main campus, University of Florida, Gainesville, Florida, United States
- Coordinates: 29.646736°N 82.338238°W
- Completed: 1932

Design and construction
- Architect: Rudolph Weaver

Website
- Gym Info

The James W. Norman Gym is a historic building on the campus of the University of Florida in Gainesville, Florida, United States. The facility was designed by Rudolph Weaver and built in 1932. It is located on U.S. Route 441, near the southwest corner of Southwest 3rd Avenue and 12th Street in Gainesville.

== See also ==
- University of Florida
- Buildings at the University of Florida
- University of Florida College of Education
