= Chitling Test =

The Chitling Test (originally named the Dove Counterbalance General Intelligence Test) was created by Adrian Dove, State Employment Officer at the Watts State Employment Service office in Watts, California (1966). Published in Jet magazine on February 9, 1967, it was designed to demonstrate differences in understanding and culture between races, specifically between African Americans and Whites.

There have been no studies demonstrating whether the Chitling Test has validity in determining how streetwise someone is. Furthermore, the Chitling Test has only proved valid as far as face validity is concerned; no evidence has been brought to light on the Chitling predicting performance.

== History ==
There has been and there continues to be much debate on the issue of race and intelligence. The reason for the development of the Chitling Test was to show that blacks and whites are fundamentally opposed in their manner of speech. Some believe that many modern day tests are racially unfair and play to the advantage of the middle class, white population. The Chitling Test showed that black vernacular and culture are different and that blacks, on average, scored higher on this test.

== Sample of questions ==
What follows are two examples from Adrian Dove's 1971 short version of the Chitling Test:

A "gas head" is a person who has a: (a) fast-moving car, (b) stable of "lace," (c) "process," (d) habit of stealing cars, (e) long jail record for arson.

Cheap chitlings (not the kind you purchase at a frozen food counter) will taste rubbery unless they are cooked long enough. How soon can you quit cooking them to eat and enjoy them? (a) 45 minutes, (b) 2 hours, (c) 24 hours, (d) 1 week (on a low flame), (e) 1 hour.

== See also ==
- Black Intelligence Test of Cultural Homogeneity
- Black culture
- African American Vernacular English
