= University of Florida College of Education =

College of the University of Florida

College of Education
- Type: Public education school
- Established: 1906
- Parent institution: University of Florida
- Dean: Glenn E. Good
- Faculty: 126 Faculty; 330 Staff
- Undergraduates: 504
- Postgraduates: 1,284
- Location: Gainesville, Florida, United States; 29°38′48.9″N 82°20′17.3″W
- Website: education.ufl.edu

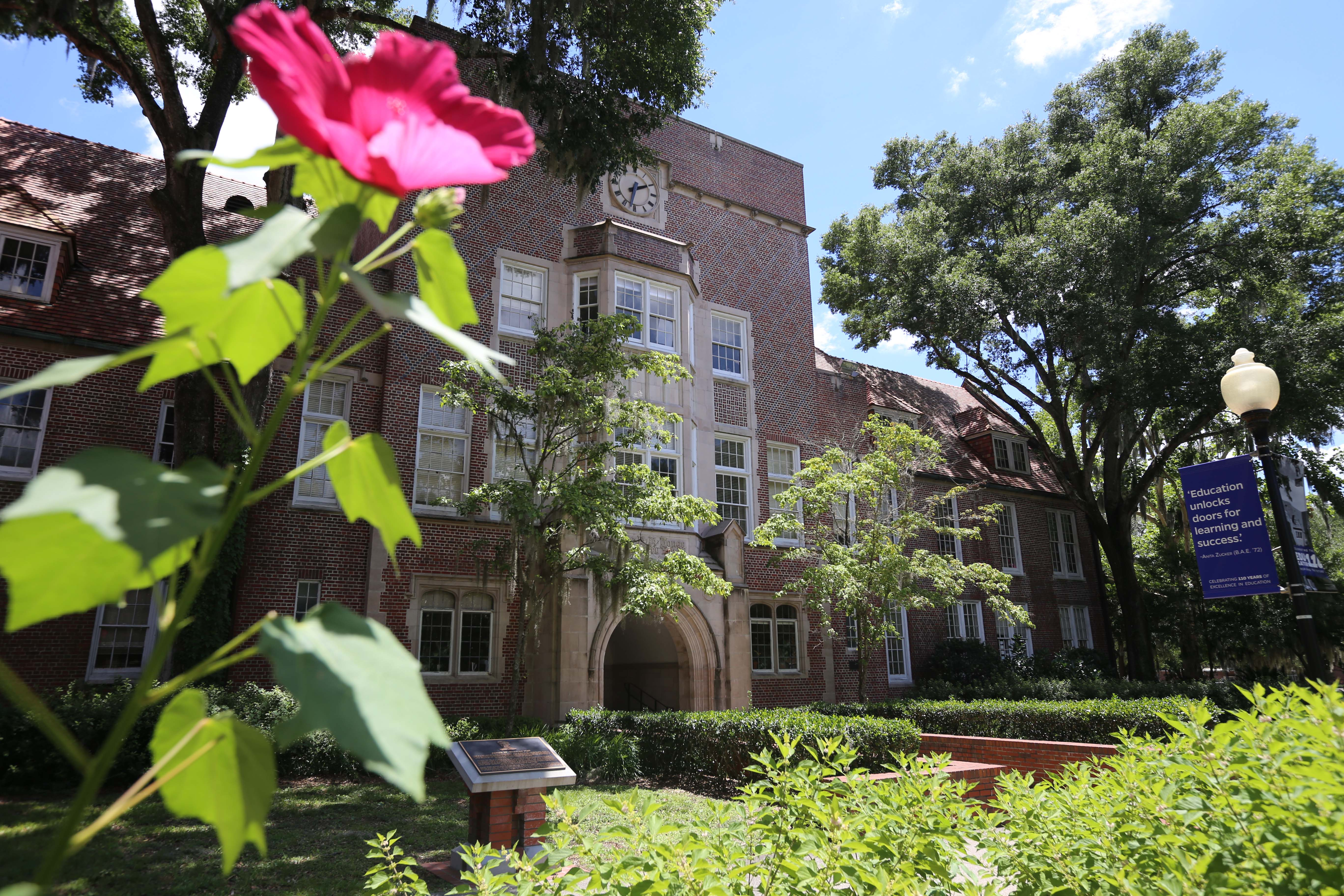
Norman Hall, Spring 2016

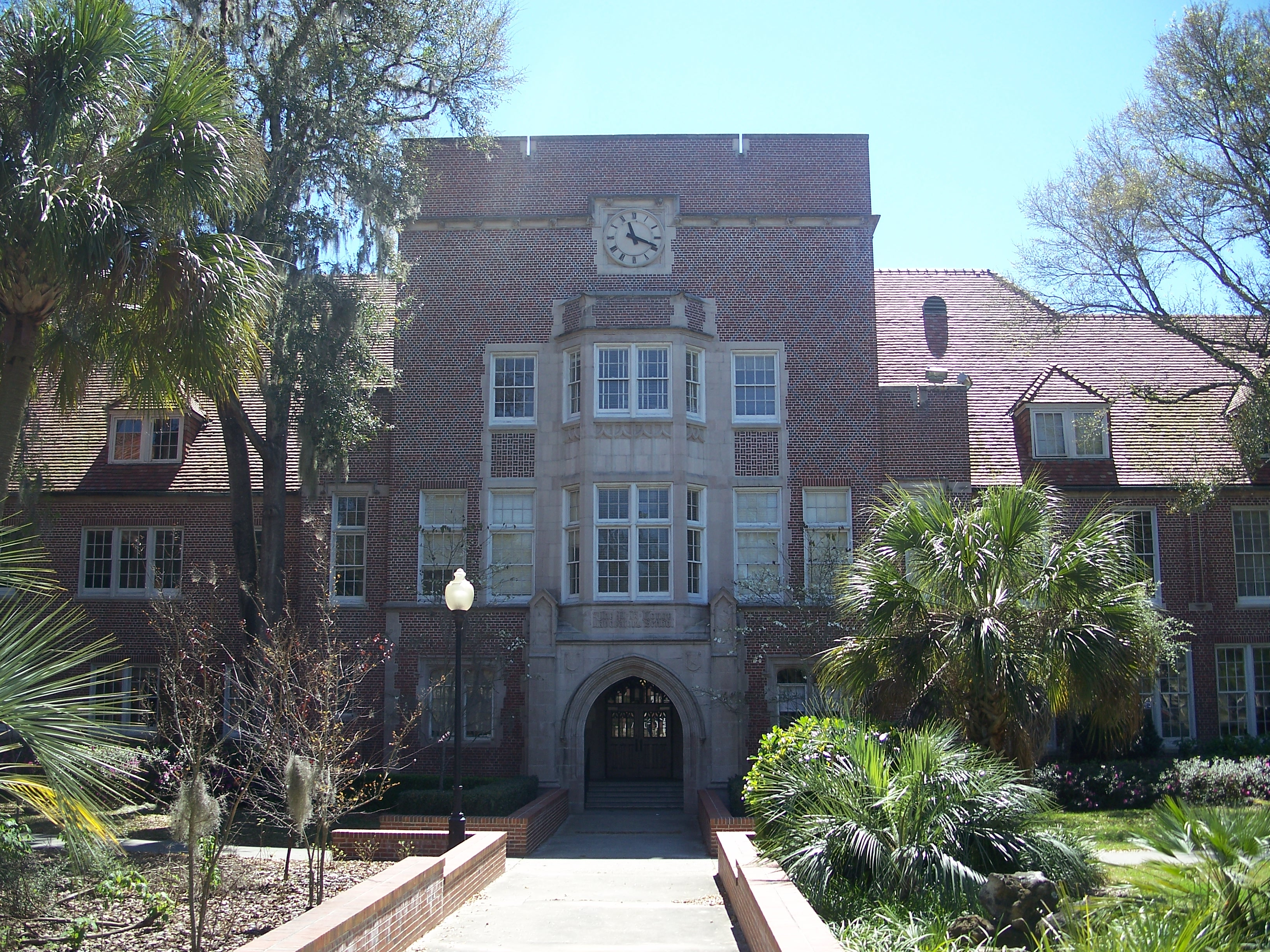
Norman Hall, home of the College of Education

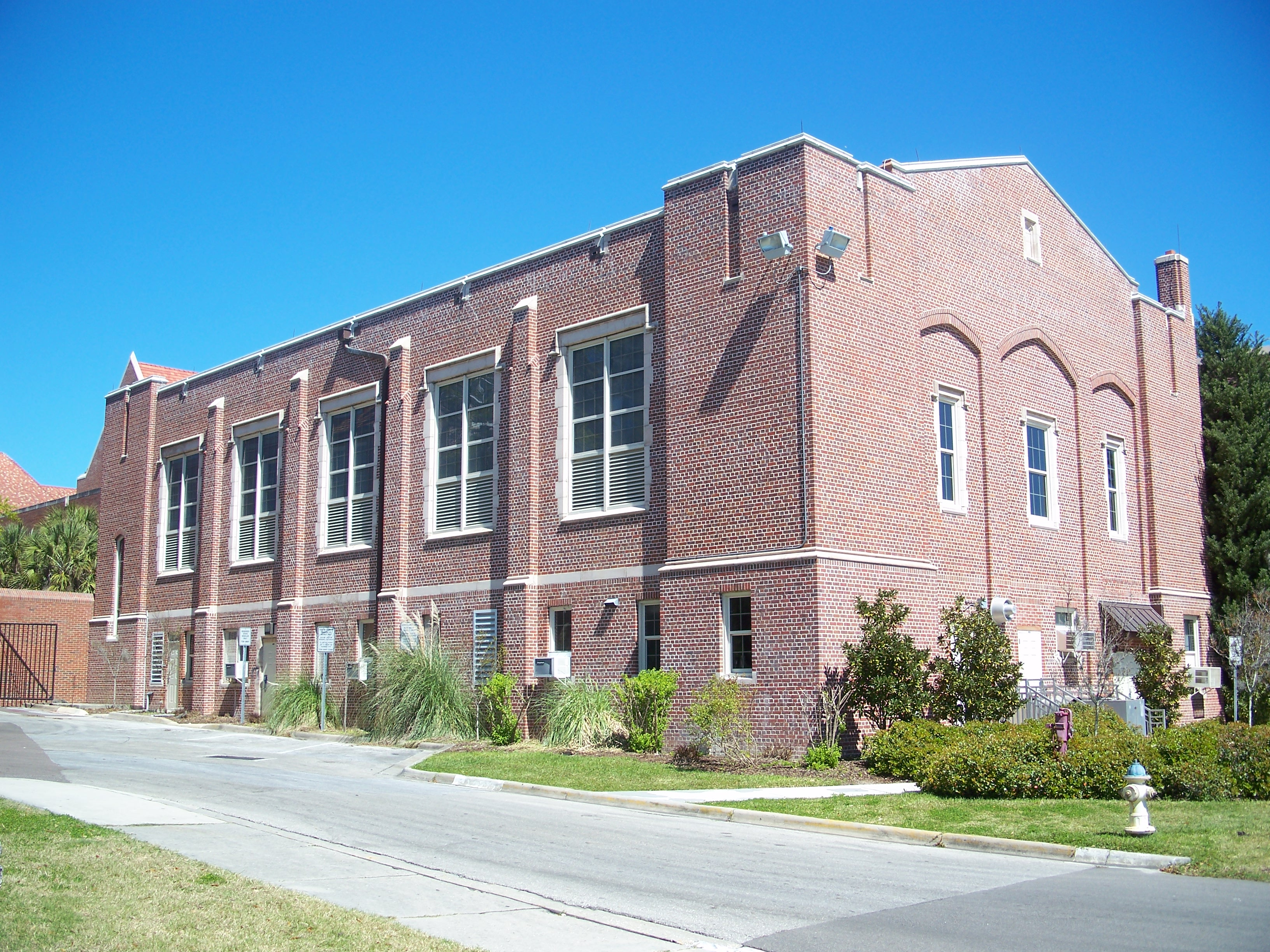
Norman Gym

The University of Florida College of Education is the teachers college of the University of Florida.

The college is located on the eastern portion of the university's Gainesville, Florida, campus in Norman Hall, and offers specializations in special education, higher education, educational policy, elementary education, counseling, teaching, and other educational programs. The college was officially founded in 1906. In fiscal year 2024, the College of Education generated $150.3 million in research funding.

== National rankings: US News & World Report (2026) ==
- College - #2 in Graduate Education, overall
- College - #2 in Online Graduate Education
- Counselor Education - #2 in Specialty Ranking
- Special Education - #5 in Specialty Ranking
- Elementary Education - #12 in Specialty Ranking
- Curriculum and Instruction - #17 in Specialty Ranking
- Educational Administration - #19 in Specialty Ranking
- Higher Education - #19 in Specialty Ranking

== History ==
In 1905, the Buckman Act was passed in the Florida Legislature, which consolidated state higher education for teacher preparation into two schools: the University of Florida for men (current University of Florida) and Florida State College of Women (current Florida State University). The college's first classes were held in 1906 at the then Normal School. The college's first dean, John Thackston, started in 1909. In 1913, the college had its first permanent building, Peabody Hall. It is located at the center of campus.

During this time, the college went through name changes such as UF Teachers College and Normal School until 1931, when the college was permanently renamed the College of Education. Shortly after the renaming, the college moved from Peabody Hall to the new P.K. Yonge Laboratory School building. This building is located in the southeast corner of the UF campus, and in 1967, the building was renamed to its current name, Norman Hall.

As the college was expanding, space was becoming tight with the university classes as well as the studies being done in the P.K. Yonge Laboratory School. Thus, in 1958, the school moved to its own 37-acre plot near the university. In 1779, a new Norman Hall annex opened. These spaces included doubling the available space for research and clinical teaching, a new media center and an education library.

In 1997, UF's counselor education program was ranked No.1 in the nation by U.S. News and World Report. In 2002, the Lastinger Center for Learning was established and became the college's hub for innovation and outreach. Also in 2002, Catherine Emihovich became the college's 12th dean. In 2004, the first fully online master's degree in curriculum and instruction with a specialization in educational technology was offered. In 2005, the Office of Educational Research was established. In 2010, the Anita Zucker Center for Excellence in Early Childhood Studies was established. This center is for scholars to advance the science and practices of early childhood development and early learning. In 2011, Glenn E. Good (current dean) became the college's 13th dean. In 2016, the college was ranked No.1 in the nation in online graduate education by U.S. News and World Report.

Since then, the college has been a top-ranked educational institution and has been placed in the top two nationally for over a decade.

== Schools and program areas ==
The College of Education has three undergraduate programs: Early Childhood Education, Education Sciences and Elementary Education. Early Childhood Education and Elementary Education are offered through the college's schools. The Education Sciences program has several specializations that correlate to the academic disciplines within the college. The college is organized into the following three schools and program areas:

=== School of Human Development and Organizational Studies in Education (HDOSE) ===
- Counselor Education
  - Marriage and Family Counseling
  - School Counseling
  - Mental Health Counseling
- Educational Leadership
- Higher Education
- Student Personnel in Higher Education
- Research and Evaluation Methodology (REM)

=== School of Special Education, School Psychology and Early Childhood Studies (SESPECS) ===
- Special Education
- School Psychology
- Early Childhood Education

=== School of Teaching and Learning (STL) ===
- Anatomical Science Education Certificate
- Computer Science Education
- Education Technology
- Elementary Education
- English Education
- ESOL/Bilingual Education
- Mathematics Education
- Reading and Literacy Education
- Science or Mathematics Teaching Certificate
- SITE: Alternative Certification ' Social Studies Education
- Social Studies Education
- Teacher Leadership Certificate
- Teacher Leadership School Improvement
- Teachers, Schools and Society
- UFTeach Mathematics and Science Education Minor

== Deans ==
Years of Service	Dean
1909-1916	John A. Thackston
1916-1920	Harvey Warren Cox
1920-1941	James W. Norman
1941-1949	G. Ballard Simmons
1949-1964	Joseph B. White
1964-1968	Kimball Wiles
1968-1978	Bert Sharp
1978-1994	David Smith
1994-1999	Roderick J. McDavis
2000-2002	Ben F. Nelms
2002-2011	Catherine Emihovich
2011-Current	Glenn E. Good

== Office of Educational Research ==
UF's College of Education faculty and graduate students pursue interdisciplinary research that informs teaching and learning, education policy and leadership in all education disciplines. Faculty engage in activities that enhance overall school improvement, human development, student achievement, early-childhood readiness, assessment and program evaluation, teacher preparation and retention, and classroom technology advances.

== Centers, institutes, and affiliates ==
- Anita Zucker Center for Excellence in Early Childhood Studies
- Collaboration for Effective Educator Development, Accountability and Reform Center
- CS Everyone Center for Computer Science Education
- Education Policy Research Center
- Institute for Advanced Learning Technologies
- Institute of Higher Education
- Lastinger Center for Learning
- P.K. Yonge Developmental Research School
- Prevention and Intervention Network Center
- University of Florida Literacy Institute

== See also ==
P.K. Yonge Developmental Research School (UF's K-12 laboratory school since 1934)
