= Ebonics (word) =

Term for African American Vernacular English

Ebonics (a portmanteau of the words ebony and phonics) is a term created in 1973 by a group of African-American scholars who disapproved of the negative terms and stereotypes being used to describe their unique language and manner of speaking. Since the 1996 controversy over its use by the Oakland School Board, the term Ebonics has primarily been used to refer to the sociolects of African-American English, which typically are distinctively different from Standard American English. In the 21st century, the term African American Vernacular English (AAVE) is often preferred, especially in the context of formal academic research.

== Original usage ==
The word Ebonics was originally coined in 1973 by African American social psychologist Robert Williams in a discussion with linguist Ernie Smith (as well as other language scholars and researchers) that took place in a conference on "Cognitive and Language Development of the Black Child", held in St. Louis, Missouri. His intention was to give a name to the language of African Americans that acknowledged the linguistic consequence of the slave trade and avoided the negative connotations of other terms like "nonstandard Negro English":

We need to define what we speak. We need to give a clear definition to our language...We know that ebony means black and that phonics refers to speech sounds or the science of sounds. Thus, we are really talking about the science of black speech sounds or language.

In 1975, the term appeared in Ebonics: The True Language of Black Folks, a book edited and co-written by Williams:

A two-year-old term created by a group of black scholars, Ebonics may be defined as "the linguistic and paralinguistic features which on a concentric continuum represent the communicative competence of the West African, Caribbean, and United States slave descendants of African origin. It includes the various idioms, patois, argots, idiolects, and social dialects of black people" especially those who have adapted to colonial circumstances. Ebonics derives its form from ebony (black) and phonics (sound, the study of sound) and refers to the study of the language of black people in all its cultural uniqueness.

Other writers have since emphasized how the term represents a view of the language of Black people as African rather than European. The term was not obviously popular, even among those who agreed with the reason for coining it. Even within Williams' book, the term Black English is far more commonly used than the term Ebonics.

John Baugh has stated that the term Ebonics is used in four ways by its Afrocentric proponents. It may:

1. Be "an international construct, including the linguistic consequences of the African slave trade";
2. Refer to the languages of the African diaspora as a whole;

or it may refer to what is normally regarded as a variety of English: either

3. It "is the equivalent of black English and is considered to be a dialect of English" (and thus merely an alternative term for African American English), or
4. It "is the antonym of black English and is considered to be a language other than English" (and thus a rejection of the notion of "African American English" but nevertheless a term for what others refer to by this term, viewed as an independent language and not a mere ethnolect).

== Common usage and controversy ==
Ebonics remained a little-known term until 1996. It does not appear in the 1989 second edition of the Oxford English Dictionary, nor was it adopted by linguists. The term became widely known in the United States due to a controversy over a decision by the Oakland School Board to denote and recognize the primary language (or sociolect or ethnolect) of African-American youths attending school, and to thereby acquire budgeted funds to facilitate the teaching of standard English. Thereafter, the term Ebonics became popularized, though as little more than a synonym for African American English, perhaps differing in the emphasis on its claimed African roots and independence from English. The term is linked with the nationally discussed controversy over the decision by the Oakland School Board, which adopted a resolution to teach children "standard American English" through a specific program of respect for students' home language and tutoring in the "code switching" required to use both standard English and Ebonics.

In 1997, a special subcommittee discussed whether federal funding for ebonics language programs would be allowed.

While the term is generally avoided by most linguists, it is used elsewhere (such as on Internet message boards), often for ridiculing AAE, particularly when this is parodied as drastically differing from Standard American English. African American linguist John McWhorter argues that the use of the term does more to hinder than to help black academic achievement because considering AAE to be a completely different language from English serves only to widen the perceived divide between whites and blacks in the United States. Walt Wolfram, a long-time researcher into AAE, points out that discussion of this variety of English "gets politicized and trivialized by the very term Ebonics."

== See also ==
- African American Vernacular English
- Code-switching
- Cubonics
- Chicano English
- Dialects of North American English
- Hebronics
- Multicultural London English
- Southern American English
- Stereotypes of African Americans
