= African-American English =

English sociolects spoken by black people in the US and Canada

- Black English
- Region: United States
- Ethnicity: African Americans
- Language family: Indo-European: Germanic; West Germanic; North Sea Germanic; Anglo–Frisian; Anglic; English; North American English; American English; African-American English
- Writing system: Latin (English alphabet); American Braille

Language codes
- ISO 639-3: –
- Glottolog: None

African-American English (AAE), or African-American Language (AAL), is the group of English dialects and creoles spoken predominantly by African Americans in the United States and, less often, in Canada. Commonly, African-American English is an umbrella term that refers to a dialect continuum ranging from non-standard varieties, like African-American Vernacular English and Gullah, to more standard American English. The term African-American Language is used to emphasize the variety's relationship with African and creole languages. Like all widely spoken language varieties, African-American English shows variation stylistically, generationally, geographically (that is, features specific to singular cities or regions only), in rural versus urban characteristics, in vernacular versus standard registers, etc. There has been a significant body of African-American literature and oral tradition for centuries.

== Name ==
Broadly, the usage of the English language by African-Americans and Black Canadians has various names, including Black American English or simply Black English. Historically other names have been used, such as: Negro dialect, Nonstandrd Negro English, Negro English, American Negro speech, Black communications, Black folk speech, Black street speech, and Afro-American English. Also common is the somewhat controversial term Ebonics and, more recently in academic linguistics, African-American Language (AAL).

== History ==
African-American English began as early as the 17th century, when the Atlantic slave trade brought enslaved West Africans into Southern colonies (which eventually became the Southern United States in the late 18th century). During the development of plantation culture in this region, nonstandard dialects of English were widely spoken by British settlers, which probably resulted in both first- and second-language English varieties being developed by African Americans. The 19th century's evolving cotton-plantation industry, and eventually the 20th century's Great Migration, certainly contributed greatly to the spread of the first of these varieties as stable dialects of English among African Americans.

The most widespread modern dialect is known as African-American Vernacular English. Despite more than a century of scholarship, the historical relationship between AAVE and the vernacular speech of (especially southern) Whites in the United States is still not very well understood; in part, this is because of a lack of data from comparable groups, but also because of the tendency to compare AAVE to northern vernaculars or even standard varieties of English while conflating regional and ethnic differences, as well as disregarding the sociohistorical context of AAVE origins. For example, features of AAVE grammar such as complex verb tenses and zero copula (omitting forms of the verb 'be') may have been inherited from African languages such as Hausa. AAVE shares several linguistic features with Southern White Vernacular English (and even more with older Southern dialects). Furthermore, the farm tenancy system that replaced slavery in the American South drew in Southern Whites, leading to a context for an interracial speech relationship dynamic among socioeconomic equals throughout the South and leading to many shared features until the start of WWII. In this case, changes that became robust after the 1930s most strongly mark ethnic distinctions in speech.

== Dialects ==
=== African-American Vernacular English ===
African-American Vernacular English (AAVE) is the native variety of the majority of working-class and many middle-class African Americans, particularly in urban areas, with its own unique accent, grammar, and vocabulary features. Typical features of the grammar include a "zero" copula (e.g., she my sister instead of she's my sister), omission of the genitive clitic (e.g., my momma friend instead of my mom's friend), and complexity of verb aspects and tenses beyond that of other English dialects (e.g., constructions like I'm a-run, I be running, I been runnin, I done ran). Common features of the phonology include non-rhoticity (dropping the r sound at the end of syllables), the metathetic use of aks instead of ask, simplification of diphthongs (e.g., eye typically sounds like ah), a raising chain shift of the front vowels, and a wider range of intonation or "melody" patterns than most General American accents. AAVE is often used by middle-class African Americans in casual, intimate, and informal settings as one end of a sociocultural language continuum, and AAVE shows some slight variations by region or city.

=== African-American Standard English ===
African-American Standard English (Linguasphere: 52-ABA-cai) is the prestigious and native end of the middle-class African-American English continuum that is used for more formal or public settings and in more careful speech than is AAVE. The term has been largely popularized by linguist Arthur Spears. This variety exhibits standard English vocabulary and grammar but often retains certain elements of the unique AAVE accent, with intonational or rhythmic features maintained more than phonological ones. Frequently, middle-class African Americans are bi-dialectal between this standard variety and AAVE, tending toward using the former variety in school and other public places, so that adults will frequently even codeswitch between the two varieties within a single conversation. The phonological features maintained in this standard dialect tend to be less marked. For instance, one such characteristic is the omission of the final consonant in word-final consonant clusters, so words such as past or hand may lose their final consonant sound.

=== African-American Appalachian English ===
Black Appalachian Americans have been reported as increasingly adopting Appalachian/Southern dialect commonly associated with White Appalachians. These similarities include an accent that is rhotic, the categorical use of the grammatical construction in "he works" and "she goes" (rather than the AAVE "he work" and "she go"), and Appalachian vocabulary (such as airish for "windy"). However, even African-American English in Appalachia is diverse, with African-American women linguistically divided along sociocultural lines.

Despite its distinctiveness, AAAE shares many features with other varieties of Appalachian English, including the use of nonstandard pronunciation, grammar, and vocabulary. AAAE also shares features with other varieties of African-American English, particularly those spoken in the South. For instance, a study of African-American communities in the Appalachian region of Virginia found that the dialects of these communities shared many features with both African-American English and Southern White English.

=== African-American Outer Banks English ===
African-American English in the North Carolina Outer Banks is rapidly accommodating to urban AAVE through the recent generations, despite having aligned with local Outer Banks English for centuries.

The dialect has been studied by linguists and has been documented in various works, such as the book African American Outer Banks English: A Sociolinguistic Study by Elizabeth C. Zsiga (2000). This book provides a detailed description of the language, including its grammar, vocabulary, and pronunciation. It also provides a history of the dialect and examines how it has changed over time.

=== African Nova Scotian English ===
African Nova Scotian English (ANS) is spoken by descendants of Black Nova Scotians, Black immigrants from the United States who live in Nova Scotia, Canada. Though most African-American freedom seekers in Canada ended up in Ontario through the Underground Railroad, only the dialect of African Nova Scotians retains the influence of West African Pidgin English. In the 19th century, African Nova Scotian English would have been indistinguishable from English spoken in Jamaica or Suriname. However, it has been increasingly de-creolized since this time, due to interaction and influence from the White Nova Scotian population. Desegregation of the province's school boards in 1964 further accelerated the process of de-creolization. The language is a relative of the African-American Vernacular English, with significant variations unique to the group's history in the area. There are noted differences in the dialects of those from Guysborough County (Black Loyalists) and those from North Preston (Black Refugees), the Guysborough group having been in the province three generations earlier.

Howe & Walker (2000) use data from early recordings of African Nova Scotian English, Samaná English, and the recordings of former slaves to demonstrate that speech patterns were inherited from nonstandard colonial English. The dialect was extensively studied in 1992 by Shana Poplack and Sali Tagliamonte from the University of Ottawa.

The grammar of ANS is largely based on standard English, but there are several distinct features that set it apart from other varieties of English. These features include the use of the negative concord—which is the use of multiple negative words in a sentence to emphasize the negative—and the double negative, which is the use of two negative words in a sentence to express a positive meaning. In addition, ANS also has its own pronunciation rules, such as Th-stopping (pronouncing ⫽ð⫽, usually spelled ⟨th⟩, as [d]) and G-dropping (pronouncing ⫽ɪŋ⫽, spelled ⟨-ing⟩, as [ɪn], [ɨ̞n] or [ən]).

A commonality between African Nova Scotian English and African-American Vernacular English is r-deletion. This rate of deletion is 57% among Black Nova Scotians, and 60% among African Americans in Philadelphia. Meanwhile, in the surrounding mostly white communities of Nova Scotia, r-deletion does not occur.

=== Older African-American English ===
Older, or earlier, African-American English refers to a set of many heterogeneous varieties studied and reconstructed by linguists as theoretically spoken by the first African Americans and enslaved Africans in British America and, later, the United States. Of primary interest is the direct theoretical predecessor to AAVE. Mainly four types of sources have been used for the historical reconstruction of older AAVE: written interviews, ex-slave audio recordings, the modern diaspora dialects of isolated Black communities, and letters written by 18th- and 19th-century African Americans. The use of the zero copula (the absence of is or are, as in She gon' leave and This my coat), nonstandard plural forms (the three man, mans, or even mens) and negative concords (as in No one didn't leave me nothing) were occasional or common variants in these earlier dialects, and the last item even the preferred variant in certain grammatical contexts. Other nonstandard grammatical constructions associated with AAVE are documented in older dialects too; however, many of them are not, evidently being recent innovations of 20th-century urban AAVE.

=== Gullah ===
Sea Island Creole English, or Gullah, is the distinct language of some African Americans along the South Carolina and Georgia coast and extending slightly into North Carolina and Florida. Gullah is an English creole: a natural language grammatically independent from English that uses mostly English vocabulary. Most Gullah speakers today are probably bidialectal. A sub-dialect of Gullah is also spoken in Oklahoma and Texas, known as Afro-Seminole Creole.

The language is derived from a mixture of African languages and English, with words and phrases from Caribbean and West African languages such as Akan, Wolof, and Fula. Gullah has been described as a "linguistic bridge between Africa and the New World". The Gullah culture is deeply rooted in African traditions, particularly in the practice of storytelling and the use of handicrafts. Gullahs have a strong connection to the land, and their traditional fishing, farming, and basket-weaving practices reflect this. In recent years, efforts have been made to preserve Gullah culture and language. The Gullah Geechee Cultural Heritage Corridor Commission was established in 2006 to help protect and promote the Gullah culture. The commission has partnered with universities, museums, and other organizations to develop programs and initiatives to preserve Gullah language and traditions.

== In literature ==
There is a long tradition of representing the distinctive speech of African Americans in American literature. A number of researchers have looked into the ways that American authors have depicted the speech of Black characters, investigating how Black identity is established and how it connects to other characters. Brasch (1981:x) argues that early mass media portrayals of Black speech are the strongest historical evidence of a separate variety of English for Black people. Early popular works are also used to determine the similarities that historical varieties of Black speech have in common with modern AAVE.

The earliest depictions of Black speech came from works written in the 18th century, primarily by white authors. A notable exception is Clotel (1853), the first novel written by an African American (William Wells Brown). Depictions have largely been restricted to dialogue and the first novel written entirely in AAVE was June Jordan's His Own Where (1971), though Alice Walker's epistolary novel The Color Purple (1982) is a much more widely known work written entirely in AAVE. Lorraine Hansberry's 1959 play A Raisin in the Sun also has near exclusive use of AAVE. The poetry of Langston Hughes (1901–1967) uses AAVE extensively.

Some other notable works have incorporated representations of Black speech, including the following examples by Black authors:

- Eric Walrond: Tropic Death (1926)
- Zora Neale Hurston: Their Eyes Were Watching God (1937)
- Sapphire: Push (1996)
- James Weldon Johnson: God's Trombones (1927)

Examples written by White authors (with varying degrees of perceived authenticity) include:

- Edgar Allan Poe: "The Gold-Bug" (1843)
- Herman Melville: Moby-Dick (1851)
- Harriet Beecher Stowe: Uncle Tom's Cabin (1851–1852)
- Joel Chandler Harris: Uncle Remus stories (1880)
- Mark Twain: Adventures of Huckleberry Finn (1885)
- Thomas Nelson Page: In Ole Virginia (1887)
- Thomas Dixon: The Clansman (1905)
- William Faulkner: The Sound and the Fury (1929)
- Margaret Mitchell: Gone with the Wind (1936)
- William Faulkner: Go Down, Moses (1942)
- John Kennedy Toole: A Confederacy of Dunces (1980)

As there is no established spelling system for AAVE, depicting it in literature is instead often done through spelling changes to indicate its phonological features, or to contribute to the impression that AAVE is being used (eye dialect). More recently, authors have begun focusing on grammatical cues, and even the use of certain rhetorical strategies.

== In television and film ==
Portrayals of Black characters in film and television are also done with varying degrees of authenticity. The speech and behavioral patterns of Delilah Johnson from Imitation of Life (1934) are reminiscent of minstrel performances that set out to exaggerate stereotypes rather than depict Black speech authentically. More authentic performances, such as those in the following films and TV shows, occur when certain speech events, vocabulary, and syntactic features are used to indicate AAVE usage, often with particular emphasis on young, urban African Americans:

African-American English has been used in television and film since the early days of Hollywood. For example, in the 1940s, the popular radio show Amos 'n' Andy featured African-American characters who spoke in African-American English. This show was popular and influential, and it established AAE as a part of popular culture. In the decades since, AAE has continued to be used in television and film as a way to depict African-American characters. It is often used to provide comedic relief or to illustrate the unique characteristics of African-American culture. For example, the 1990s television show Martin featured a main character who speaks in AAE and is often the source of comedic moments.

- Amos 'n' Andy (1940)
- Do the Right Thing (1989)
- The Fresh Prince of Bel-Air (1990–1996)
- Jungle Fever (1991)
- Laurel Avenue (1993)
- Fresh (1994)
- The Best Man (1999)
- The Wire (2002–2008)
- Moonlight (2016)

== In education ==
Nonstandard African-American varieties of English have been stereotypically associated with a lower level of education and low social status. Since the 1960s, however, linguists have demonstrated that each of these varieties, and namely African-American Vernacular English, is a "legitimate, rule-governed, and fully developed dialect". The techniques used to improve the proficiency of African-American students learning standard written English have sometimes been similar to that of teaching a second language. Contrastive analysis is used for teaching topics in African-American Vernacular English. Both the phonological and syntactic features of a student's speech can be analyzed and recorded in order to identify points for contrast with Standard American English. Another way AAE can be taught is based on a strategy, communicative flexibility, that focuses on language used at home and analyzes speech during dramatic play. Using this method, children are taught to recognize when SAE is being used and in which occasions, rather than conforming to the speech around them in order to sound correct.

Although the stigmatization of AAE has continued, AAE remains because it has functioned as a social identity marker for many African-Americans. The goal with teaching SAE is not to end its use, but to help students differentiate between settings where its use is and is not considered acceptable. In addition, research has also found that AAE can be used as a bridge to mainstream academic English. By understanding the similarities and differences between AAE and mainstream American English, teachers can provide students with effective strategies for learning and using both dialects.

Recently, linguists like John McWhorter have tried to persuade the public that "Black English" is not a separate language from or imperfect form of "Standard English". He argues that Black English is a separate dialect, distinct from Standard English in the same way that Canadian French and Swiss French are distinct from the standard dialect of Parisian French. He also acknowledges that we have a long way to go as a society in recognizing Black English as anything but "full of slang and bad grammar".

== In music ==
African-American English, particularly AAVE, is often used by rappers in hip-hop music. AAE also has a long tradition as the main dialect of spirituals, blues, jazz, R&B, and other music movements and styles originating with African Americans.

== See also ==
- African-American Vernacular English
- Liberian English
- Tutnese
- Africanisms
- Code-switching
- Dialects of North American English
- Eldred Kurtz Means, who made a literary career writing in dialect.
- English-based creole languages
- Glossary of jive talk
- Griot
- Gullah language
- Habitual be
- Is-leveling
- Languages of the United States
- Sociolinguistics
- Southern American English
- Samaná English
- Jamaican Patois
- Texan English
- List of dialects of English
