= Glenn E. Good =

Glenn E. Good is the 13th dean of the College of Education at the University of Florida.

Good has been the current dean of the College of Education at the University of Florida since October 2011. Since 2025, the college's annual research expenditures have increased to over $133M and $89M in philanthropic support. The college also has 126 full-time faculty and 330 full-time staff that serve over 6,000 students across the university.

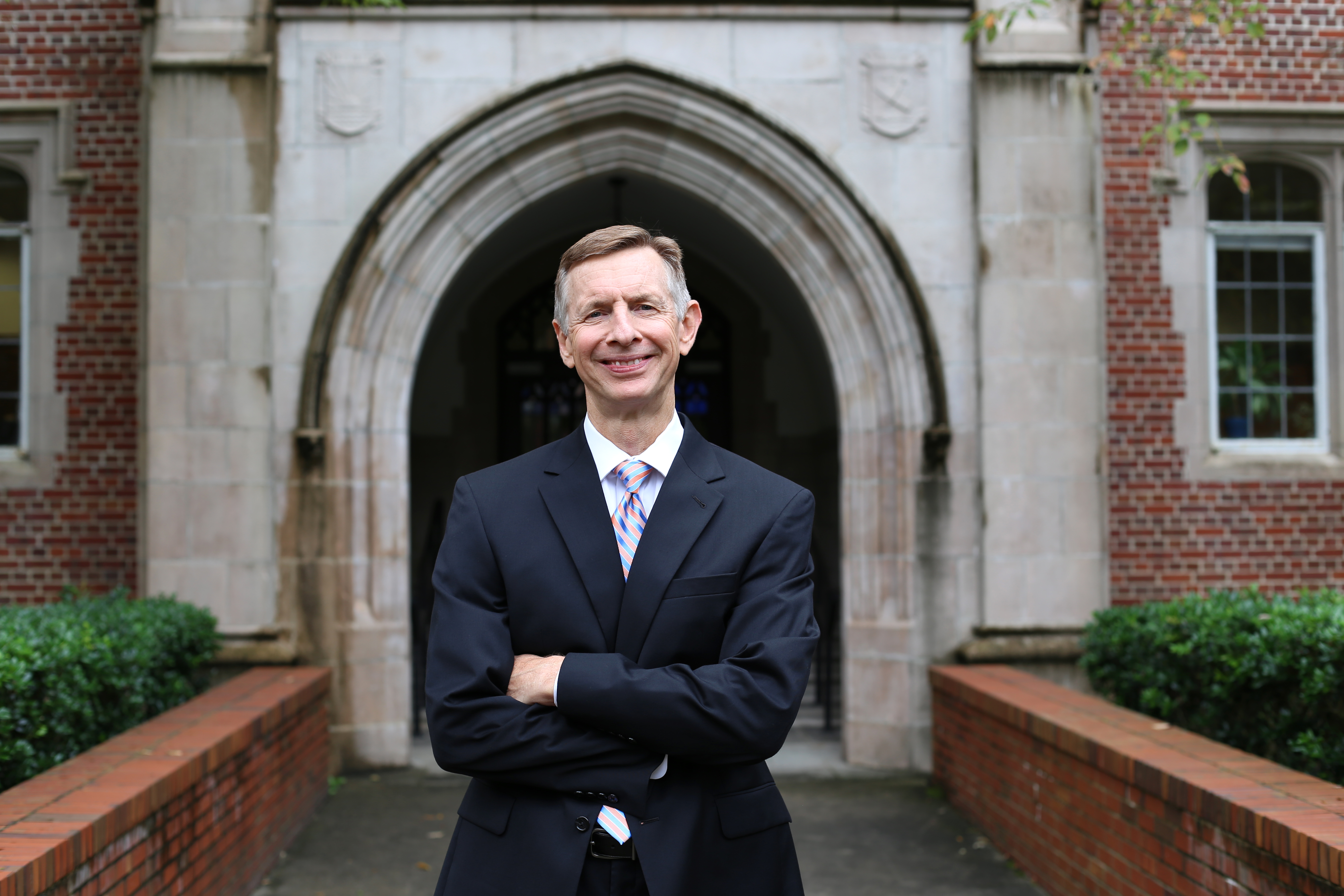
Glenn E. Good, PhD

Prior to coming to the University of Florida, he was a professor and associate dean at the University of Missouri-Columbia. While there, he was named Mentor/Advisor of the Year and received the William T. Kemper Fellowship for Teaching Excellence.

Good has authored or co-authored five books, written in more than 90 peer-reviewed articles and spoken in over 200 conference presentations. Some of his books include Counseling and Psychotherapy Essentials: Integrating Theories, Skills, and Practices (W. W. Norton) and The New Handbook of Psychotherapy and Counseling with Men (Jossey-Bass).

He is also a Fellow of the American Psychological Association (APA) in four of its divisions: Division 17 (Society of Counseling Psychology), Division 29 (Psychotherapy), Division 35 (Society for the Psychology of Women) and Division 51(Society for the Psychological Study of Men and Masculinity). From Division 51, he has twice received the Researcher of the Year award. In 2015, Good was recognized as one of the 30 Most Influential Deans of Education (14th overall and 12th in public universities) by Mometrix Media.

Good has served in national and international organizations that promote education. Since 2014, Good has been a co-chair of the Learning and Education Academic Research Network (LEARN). He is also a current member of the Council of Academic Deans from Research Education Institutions (CADREI). He is also a member of the AAU Deans of Colleges of Education Network and a former co-chair from 2015 to 2016. From 2014 to 2016, he was a member of the executive committee of the Consortium of university and Research Institutions (CURI) of the American Educational Research Association.

== Education ==
- Bachelor's degree in psychology from the University of California, Davis in 1977.
- Master's degree in counseling from the University of Oregon in 1979.
- Doctoral degree in psychology specializing in counseling psychology from The Ohio State University in 1987.
- Post-doctoral study in the President's Academic Leadership Institute from the University of Missouri System in 2010.
- Post-doctoral study in the Management Development Program of the Graduate School of Education of Harvard University in 2011.

== Notes ==
1. Good’s profile from UF College of Education
2. UF names new education dean, citing research strength as key
3. About the College of Education at the University of Florida
4. University of Florida graduate schools rank high among nation’s top programs
