= The Counseling Psychologist =

- Discipline: Psychology
- Language: English
- Edited by: Lydia P. Buki

Publication details
- History: 1969-present
- Publisher: SAGE Publications in association with the Society of Counseling Psychology (United States)
- Frequency: 8/year
- Impact factor: 1.348 (2017)

Standard abbreviations
- ISO 4: Couns. Psychol.

Indexing
- ISSN: 0011-0000 (print); 1552-3861 (web)
- LCCN: 72006502
- OCLC no.: 1565312

Links
- Journal homepage; Online access; Online archive

The Counseling Psychologist is a peer-reviewed academic journal that focuses on timely topics in such diverse areas as multiculturalism and cross-cultural competency, research methods, vocational psychology, assessment, international counseling and research, prevention and intervention, health, social justice, assessment, and training and supervision. This journal is a member of the Committee on Publication Ethics (COPE). The journal's editor is Lydia P. Buki, PhD (University of Miami). It has been in publication since 1969 and is currently published by SAGE Publications in association with the Society of Counseling Psychology, Division 17 of the American Psychological Association.

== Scope ==
The Counseling Psychologist aims to increase the knowledge base of counseling psychology through debate and comprehensive coverage of new and developing areas of research and practice. This journal is the official publication of the Society of Counseling Psychology (Division 17) of the American Psychological Association. Articles focus on the theory, research, and practice of counseling psychology. In addition, the journal has two forums, the International Forum and the Legacies and Tradition Forum, which highlight scholarship involving international populations and document the history of the field of counseling psychology, respectively.

== Abstracting and indexing ==
The Counseling Psychologist is abstracted and indexed in, among other databases: SCOPUS, and the Social Sciences Citation Index. According to the Journal Citation Reports, its 2017 impact factor is 1.348, ranking it 54 out of 82 journals in the category 'Psychology, Applied'. In 2017, the impact factor fell to 1.348.
