= Ebonics: The True Language of Black Folks =

- First edition cover
- Author: Robert L. Williams
- Language: English
- Publisher: Institute of Black Studies
- Publication date: 1975

Ebonics: The True Language of Black Folks is a 1975 book written by the American psychologist Robert Williams. Williams coined the term Ebonics two years earlier at a conference he organized on the topic of the "cognitive and language development of the African American child". This book defines the term (which Williams translated as "black sounds") as the "linguistic and para-linguistic features which on a concentric continuum represent the communicative competence of the West African, Caribbean, and United States slave descendants of African origin".
