= Journal of Multicultural Counseling and Development =

Quarterly peer-reviewed academic journal

- Discipline: Counseling
- Language: English
- Edited by: Carla Adkison-Johnson

Publication details
- Former names: Journal of Non-White Concerns in Personnel and Guidance
- History: 1972-present
- Publisher: Wiley-Blackwell for the American Counseling Association on behalf of the Association for Multicultural Counseling and Development
- Frequency: Quarterly
- Impact factor: 0.421 (2016)

Standard abbreviations
- ISO 4: J. Multicult. Couns. Dev.

Indexing
- ISSN: 0883-8534 (print); 2161-1912 (web)
- LCCN: 85644529
- OCLC no.: 44600687

Links
- Journal homepage; Online access; Online archive

Journal of Multicultural Counseling and Development is a quarterly peer-reviewed academic journal published by Wiley-Blackwell for the American Counseling Association on behalf of the Association for Multicultural Counseling and Development. The journal was established in 1972 as the Journal of Non-White Concerns in Personnel and Guidance.

The current editor-in-chief is Carla Adkison-Johnson, PH.D (Western Michigan University). The journal covers research, theory, and program applications pertinent to multicultural and racial and ethnic minority interests in all areas of counseling and human development.

According to the Journal Citation Reports, the journal has a 2016 impact factor of 0.421, ranking it 78th out of 80 journals in the category "Psychology, Applied".
