= Social undermining =

Type of anti-social behavior

Social undermining is the expression of negative emotions directed towards a particular person or negative evaluations of the person as a way to prevent the person from achieving their goals.

This behavior can often be attributed to certain feelings, such as dislike or anger. The negative evaluation of the person may involve criticizing their actions, efforts or characteristics. Social undermining is seen in relationships between family members, friends, personal relationships and co-workers. Social undermining can affect a person's mental health, including an increase in depressive symptoms. This behavior is only considered social undermining if the person's perceived action is intended to hinder their target. When social undermining is seen in the work environment the behavior is used to hinder the co-worker's ability to establish and maintain a positive interpersonal relationship, success and a good reputation. Examples of how an employee can use social undermining in the work environment are behaviors that are used to delay the work of co-workers, to make them look bad or slow them down, competing with co-workers to gain status and recognition and giving co-workers incorrect or even misleading information about a particular job.

== Definition ==
According to Duffy, Ganster, and Pagon, 2002, the definition of social undermining in a workplace is, behavior intended to hinder over time and not allowing a person to establish or maintain positive interpersonal relationships.

== In the workplace ==
Social undermining has been very effective in the workplace. Various aspects of social undermining have affected the workplace and specific races. In workplaces, social undermining has connection with social interaction. Research has shown if a person has a supportive environment in their work setting, they are more likely to have a more satisfied life. Research has shown that social undermining exists in a separate and distinct continuum when looking at positive workplace behavior (e.g. social support).

Social undermining can arise through interactions with co-workers and supervisors; these interactions have an effect on the workers that are being undermined and can affect their work performance. Vinokur found that those who alleged to have social undermining in the workplace reported to have poorer mental health and experienced less well-being. The study shows that undermining has a significant role in worker-supervisor and co-worker relationship and that it leads to various different outcomes such as feelings of irritability, anxiety, depersonalization, and depression. It shows that social undermining affects a person's work ethics and well-being.

Various different empirical studies have found that undermining has three specific factors that develop counterfactual thoughts. For example: "what would my life be like if I were not the target of undermining?" These studies' findings indicate that "this rift plays a role in determining the magnitude of the employee's reaction to the event by making the deprived state more salient".

Behaviors of social undermining can affect a person and their perceptions. The study conducted by Gant et al. addressed African American workers' perceptions of co-workers and supervisors. The research by Duffy, Gangster, Shaw, Johnson, and Pagon addressed the fairness theory introduced by Folger and Cropanzano 1998. The fairness theory suggests that when individuals face negative situations (such as being undermined by coworkers or supervision) they make cognitive comparisons known as counterfactual thoughts; i.e., they compare what actually happened to what might have been. The results show that social undermining is closely related to attitudes and behavior regarding one person being or feeling "singled out".

=== Abusive supervision ===
Abusive supervision can arise in different areas such as in the household, at school, and at a workplace. "Abusive supervision has been investigated as an antecedent to negative subordinate workplace outcome" ; "Workplace violence has combination of situational and personal factors" (e.g., Barling, 1996). The study that was conducted looked at the link between abusive supervision and different workplace events. Social undermining can arise from abusive supervision, such as when a supervisor uses negative actions and it leads to "flow downhill"; a supervisor is perceived as abusive.

Research has shown that "abusive supervision is a subjective assessment made by subordinates regarding their supervisors" behavior towards them over a period of time. For example, abusive supervision includes a "boss demeaning, belittling, or invading privacy of the subordinate.

Hostile attribution bias is an extra punitive mentality where individuals tend to project blame on others. Researchers wanted to see how hostile attribution bias can moderate the relationship between perceptions of psychological contract violation and subordinates' perceptions of abusive supervision. Undermining does arise with abusive supervision, which affects families and aggression; they believe that there is a stronger positive relationship between experiences of psychological contract violation and subordinates' reports of abuse. It suggests that when someone has a negative work environment, it will affect their emotional training ground where this would result in negative home encounters. The findings from this study show that abused subordinates' family members reported a higher incidence of undermining in their home. When this occurs, complications arise at both home and work. Workplace abuse may be spawning negative interpersonal relations in the home, which may contribution to a downward spiral of relationships in both spheres.

When a subordinate is being abused, it can lead to negative affect towards their family where the subordinate starts undermining their family members. The undermining can arise from displaced aggression which is "redirection of a [person's] harm doing behavior from a primary to a secondary target" (Tedeschi & Norman, 1985, p. 30). Family undermining arises from a negative work environment: when someone above you puts you down, one starts to think that one should be put down by one's family members.

=== Bottom-line mentality ===
Bottom line is defined as profits or losses of a business. Greenbaum and colleagues found that some employees tend to focus on a bottom-line outcome, which may be related to their tendency to engage in social undermining behavior. Employees with a bottom line mentality (BLM) tend to focus on only the bottom line, and to neglect other outcomes of their actions, including interpersonal consequences. Research has found that a bottom-line mentality can cause a problem, especially if the employer uses BLM as an objective for them to strive for. If someone is hurt by their actions it is not a priority for those with a BLM.

Employees that have a BLM may learn these actions from their supervisors. BLMs can cause rivalries within the organization since the employee may feel as if the organization should have a winner or loser when it comes to completing work. Employees with this approach think of their work as a game where the winner takes all instead of working with other employees to make sure everyone is contributing to the work that needs to be completed. The competitiveness that is created between the coworkers is to attain bottom-line outcomes. When the employees are trying to attain bottom-line outcomes with this winner-take-all mentality, they begin to want their co-workers to fail, as that consequently means to the undermining employee that they must be succeeding. The supervisor's BLM causes employee social undermining. This happens because the employees may role-model after the adopted supervisor's BLM. Employee personality also plays a role in the relationship between BLM and undermining. Employees that have confidence in their work ability rely on their work ethic while employees who are low in confidence are more likely to engage in social undermining behavior to make themselves look better when it comes to the bottom line of success.

== Individual differences ==
Research suggests that whether or not someone engages in social support or social undermining depends upon their own goals. Those with compassionate goals are more likely to be supportive of others, while those who have more selfish motives believe that people should take care of themselves. When people have goals to preserve their own self-image this can undermine their compassionate goals and make them less supportive.

== Health ==
Research has shown that social undermining can have an effect on a person's health. It has been shown that social undermining can cause depressive symptoms. Depending on the relationship between a patient and their loved one, the loved one can support or undermine the patient and can even do both within the same interaction, which can increase the depressive symptoms. Creating more social support can improve treatment outcomes of a patient depending on the type of stress level the person is enduring.

Research by Joseph et al. found that when participants are exposed to high levels of social undermining and even high levels of social support it can improve the participants course of antidepressive treatment. High levels of social support and social undermining could reduce and also cause remission of the participant's depressive symptoms. The study found that African American participants who had low levels of social undermining were able to fare better than the Caucasians participants in reducing their symptoms. When both groups of participants were given high levels of social undermining the African American participants had fewer achievements in symptom reduction, while the Caucasians participants had the reverse effect of symptom reduction.

Research conducted by Horwitz et al. (1998) found that spouse undermining was almost twice as large as the effect for support. For example, a spouse that shows behaviors of withdrawal, avoidance and being overly critical can cause psychological distress in a relationship. This in turn causes stress that increases the depressive symptoms on individuals that have endure high levels of social undermining. This can happen, because the support that a person can get from their spouse compared to a close friend is more exclusive and generally involves more frequent and emotionally intense interactions (Cutrone 1996; Vinokur & Vinokur & Vinokur- Kaplan, 1990) and depending on their relationship that can influence the social support or even the social undermining that affect the relationship.

Cranford found that spouse undermining and not spouse support can increase depressive symptoms within that relationship. Social undermining has been found to be a stronger indicator for psychological adaption than social support. When there is social undermining in a relationship it can have fatal effects on the spouse's ability to deal with other stressors. It can also lead to an increase of wishful thinking, poor psychological adjustment, maladaptive coping behaviors, and even decrease adaptive coping behaviors. This can give more attention to coping resources and it takes away from other stressors which causes the couple to have fewer chances resolving their problems. If the couple cannot resolve their problems it can cause marital conflict. Social undermining within the relationship can cause negative effects on the spouse physical health and can make the spouse vulnerable to different stressors. This can lead to depressive symptoms that can lessen the spouse self-esteem.

=== Nutrition and exercise ===
Research has shown that partners that offer social support can also offer social undermining. An example of this is when family members try to undermine parenting styles in order to raise healthy children. Another study found that participants who endure social undermining regarding their eating and exercise behavior, try to ignore the pressure, and the undermining affects their exercise decisions more than eating decisions.

Market, Stanforth, and Garcia found that social undermining used by family members, friends and coworkers can affect daily activities. Social undermining can affect exercise routines when their exercise routines can conflict with seeing friends or even coworkers. Friends and coworkers can influence the person to skip their exercise, even when a spouse is concerned about their well-being. The study also showed that social undermining can affect men and women differently. Men tend to feel as if they can overcome social undermining because they were still able to make a healthy eating decision. Women have stated that they tend to make bad eating decision when they are eating with other people such as their friends. Social undermining pressures can cause serious challenges when a person is trying to maintain healthy eating and trying to stay active. The study found that people that engage in undermining behavior tend to feel guilty about their own unhealthy behavior and may feel jealous of someone else maintaining their healthy behavior when they cannot achieve the same behavior. The study also suggests when a person is satisfied with their weight it can help the person resist against social undermining. By being satisfied with one's own weight can reduce the likelihood of social undermining in social situations when having dinner with friends. So when a person is not satisfied with their weight they receive more social undermining pressures from the people around them.

=== Mental health ===
Social undermining and social support can have opposite effects on a person that can be negative or positive depending on the person or even the relationship. Being in a close relationship can provide a person both social undermining and social support. Example of these relationships can be an abusive relationship that offers low support and high undermining. A typical healthy close relationship has high support and low undermining. In a relationship between an adolescent and a parent, their relationship can offer high levels of support and even undermining. Depending on the relationship, patterns can change over time based on the characteristics and the situation of the relationship. Whether a relationship is positive or negative can have devastating effects.

Social support can give a person coping resources that can reduce threat in a stressful situation. In a relationship if a partner has lower status or even lower power social undermining becomes more of threat for the relationship. Research concludes that social undermining has a greater impact on a person's mental health than social support.

Vinokur and van Ryn used unemployed participants and some of the participants were reemployed to look at the impact that social support and social undermining can have on a person's mental health during economic hardships. They suggest that although the support and undermining are inversely and strongly correlated they do not form the same factor but constitute empirically distinct constructs. The study looked at the effect of financial strain, social support, and undermining on poor mental health the results found that it was not statistically significant. Social support and social undermining did have significant but the opposite effect on poor mental health. Vinokur and Ryn (1993) found that social support and undermining were shown in longitudinal design even when prior levels of mental health and the contribution of another critical stressful factor. Social support and undermining had a dynamic pattern influence on mental health.

The results showed that social support has weak positive effect while social undermining has more volatile effects. Even though the study found that a high level of social undermining has significant effects on mental health when the high levels are reduced there is an improvement in the person mental health over a period of time. In the study participants that received high levels of social undermining even after they return to their normal interactions the participant still returns to high level of undermining that affects the person mental health. These findings were found in relationships for men and women that were either unemployed or reemployed.

Another example of how social undermining can affect a person's relationship is shown by a study conducted by McCaskill and Lakey which examined social support and social undermining when it came to adolescents and family relationships. Social support and social undermining can reflect different characteristics in the environment that can influence a person's mental health. The study examined how adolescents reported their family support and undermining which reflected shared social reality (that is, all members of the family agree that support or undermining is occurring) and idiosyncratic perception (some family members believe that support or undermining has occurred, but others do not). The results of the study found that girls tend to report higher family stress and negative affect than boys. McCaskill and Lakey (2002) found that adolescents with previous outpatient treatment experience reported both lower family support and higher family stress.

Researchers found that in adolescent self-reports, social undermining was related to negative affect and perceived support was more related to positive affect. The study found that adolescents' idiosyncratic perceptions of family support did predict positive emotion, but shared perceptions of support did not. For social undermining, adolescents' idiosyncratic perceptions, the idiosyncratic perceptions of the other family members as well as shared social reality that was among family members did predict negative emotion. The study suggest that social support is not based on a shared reality, while social undermining is.

Due to the differences in the scope of the effects of social undermining and social support, many researchers have concluded that they are separate constructs, rather than two ends of a continuum.

== Emotional and behavioral reactions ==
Research has found that, depending on how the victim handles social undermining, it can have damaging effects when it comes to increased counterproductive behaviors, reciprocated social undermining, and decreased job satisfaction. These negative outcomes can cause the person to have depression, a decreased self-esteem and even psychosomatic symptoms.

In a study of victims' perceptions of undermining they had experienced, Crossley found that when an offense was severe, the victim was more likely to believe that the offender committed the action with malicious intent or due to personal greed. Generally, victims' perceptions of the offenders' intentions relate to whether the victim responds to the undermining in a negative fashion with feelings of anger and a desire for revenge, or in a positive fashion with a desire to reconcile with the offender.

Post-traumatic embitterment disorder can be a reaction to this feeling of victimisation.

== See also ==
- Abuse
- Blacklisting
- Bullying
- Character assassination
- Destabilisation
- Discrediting
- Divide and rule
- Gamesmanship
- Gaslighting
- Industrial and organizational psychology
- Kiss up kick down
- Mind games
- Negativity effect
- Occupational health psychology
- Passive-aggressive behavior
- Sedition
- Setting up to fail
- Workplace aggression
- Workplace incivility
