= Toxic leader =

Leader who abuses the leader–follower relationship

A toxic leader is a person who abuses the leader–follower relationship by leaving the group or organization in a worse condition than it was in originally. Toxic leaders therefore create an environment that may be detrimental to employees, thus lowering overall morale in the organization.

== History ==
In his 1994 journal article "Petty Tyranny in Organizations" Blake Ashforth discussed potentially destructive sides of leadership and identified what he referred to as "petty tyrants", i.e. leaders who exercise a tyrannical style of management, resulting in a climate of fear in the workplace.

In 1996 Marcia Lynn Whicker popularized the term "toxic leader".

== Basic traits ==
The basic traits of a toxic leader are generally considered to be either/or insular, intemperate, glib, operationally rigid, callous, inept, discriminatory, corrupt or aggressive by scholars such as Barbara Kellerman.

=== Psychopathy ===
Characteristics that may be present in a toxic leader include those classically associated with psychopathy. There has been a substantial increase in media and academic interest in psychopathy within the workplace. This growing attention has often outpaced the available scientific research, leading to widespread assertions about the harmful effects of workplace psychopathy that are not yet fully supported by empirical evidence. A study by Scott Lilienfeld and others examined the associations psychopathy had with occupational and academic differences, workplace aggression and counterproductive behaviors, ethical decision-making in corporate environments, white-collar crime, and leadership. While preliminary findings suggest that psychopathy may be linked to various negative workplace outcomes, there are also isolated indications of potential benefits.

=== Other traits ===
The United States Army defines toxic leaders as commanders who put their own needs first, micro-manage subordinates, behave in a mean-spirited manner or display poor decision-making. A study for the Center for Army Leadership found that toxic leaders in the army work to promote themselves at the expense of their subordinates, and usually do so without considering long-term ramifications to their subordinates, their unit, and the Army profession.

Ashforth proposed the following six characteristics to define petty tyranny:

1. Arbitrariness and self-aggrandizement
2. Belittling of subordinates
3. Lack of consideration for others
4. A forcing style of conflict resolution
5. Discouragement of initiative
6. Noncontingent use of punishment: that is, punishment (e.g. displeasure or criticism) allotted without discernible or consistent principles; not dependent on, or necessarily associated with, undesirable behaviors.

The setting up to fail procedure is in particular a well established workplace bullying tactic that a toxic leader can use against his rivals and subordinates. Heavy running costs and a high staff turnover/overtime rate are often also associated with employee related results of a toxic leader.

== See also ==
- Abusive supervision
- Culture of fear
- Divide and conquer
- Kick the cat
- Kiss up kick down
- Leadership accountability
- Machiavellianism in the workplace
- Narcissism in the workplace
- Psychopathy in the workplace
- Queen bee syndrome
- Toxic workplace
- Workplace bullying
