= Toxic workplace =

Informal term for a workplace marked by infighting and personal conflict

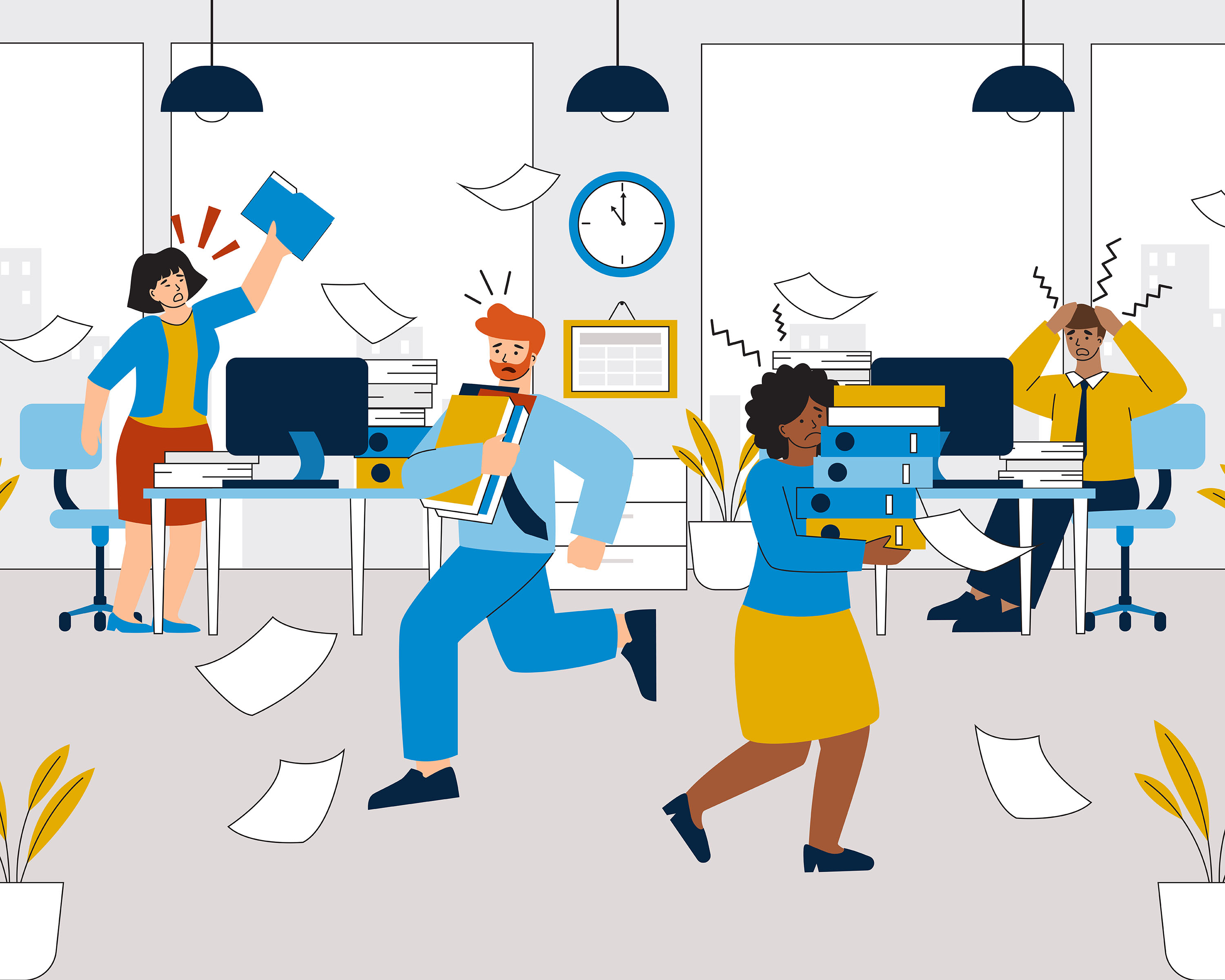

"Toxic workplace" is a colloquial metaphor used to describe a place of work, usually an office environment, that is marked by significant personal conflicts between those who work there. A toxic work environment has a negative impact on an organization's productivity and viability. This type of environment can be detrimental to both the effectiveness of the workplace and the well-being of its employees.

== History ==
The word toxic was first used as a metaphor for poisonous interpersonal relationships (as opposed to a factual description of a workplace literally involving toxic chemicals) in 1989, in a book about leadership for nurses. This book contrasted a toxic work environment, with a high-conflict and uncollaborative approach, against a "nourishing" workplace, with shared values and active listening.

== Characteristics ==
Toxic work environments may be characterized by horizontal hostility among workers.

Toxic workplaces are created by the actions of toxic employers or employees; that is, individuals who are motivated by personal gain, whether driven by power, money, fame, or special status, utilize unethical means or behaviors to psychologically manipulate, belittle, or frustrate those around them, or divert attention away from their personal inadequate performance or misdeeds. Toxic workers do not feel a sense of duty toward their workplace or their co-workers, especially in regard to ethical or professional conduct toward others. Toxic workers also define relationships with co-workers, not by appropriate organizational structure, but by those who they like/dislike or trust/distrust.

In 2017 and 2021, nineteen percent of Americans suffered abusive conduct at work, according to the Workplace Bullying Institute.

In 2017, the Workplace Bullying Institute found that 61% of bullies were bosses, a figure which rose to 65% in 2021. A 2022 study by McKinsey & Company concluded that women are 41% more likely to be subjected to a toxic workplace culture and that their risk of burnout is elevated.

== Corporate and organizational results ==
This phenomenon harms both the company and the employees, including those who are not direct targets. Co-workers are distracted by drama, gossip, and by choosing sides in the ongoing animosity. This can translate into lost productivity. While employees are distracted by this activity, they can not devote time and attention to the achievement of business goals. Positively motivated and ethical employees may try to speak up to a toxic employee, but this can make them a target (see Whistleblower). Managers of toxic employees can feel intimidated by a toxic employee and try to appease the employee in an effort to avoid confrontation. Over time, positively motivated employees drift away from the workplace and may begin to view management as inept and ineffective. This can result in poor job performance as they begin to feel less valued and, therefore, less loyal to the company.

=== Health and social impact ===
Fellow employees may begin to experience physical symptoms from the stress and worry over whether they or someone they care about in the workplace may be targeted. This can even develop into a clinical depression requiring treatment.

The National Institute for Occupational Safety and Health found toxic workplace environments are a leading cause of workplace violence such as, “violent acts, including physical assaults and threats of assault, directed toward persons at work or on duty.” Studies on this issue include verbal violence (threats, verbal abuse, hostility, harassment, etc.) can cause significant psychological trauma and stress, even if no physical injury takes place. Verbal assaults and hostility can also escalate to physical violence.

Toxic workplaces negatively impact employee health by undermining social relationships and may reduce life expectancy.

== Prevention and resolution ==
Interventions to address this negative behavior in the workplace should be undertaken carefully. Fixing the problem should be very important and will likely be very beneficial rather than causing any extra trouble.

When toxic workers leave the workplace, it can improve the culture overall because the remaining staff becomes more engaged and productive. The process of removing the toxic employee allows the other employees to become more willing to open up and communicate with each other as they learn to help and support one another anew. This is significant for the overall culture of the company. Companies that articulate a strong set of cultural values regarding communication, respect, and professionalism as well as a performance evaluation system that ranks both technical performance and the professional treatment of fellow employees are felt by HR professionals to be more resilient and stable.

In the United States, the issue of workplace bullying has garnered increasing attention from state governments; as of 2026, while thirty-two states have introduced versions of the Healthy Workplace Bill over the past two decades, (Note: As of October 2023, only 3 states have currently active bills.) it has yet to be signed into law in any U.S. state. Only Puerto Rico has enacted comprehensive anti-bullying legislation (Act 90-2020). Recently, advocates have shifted focus toward the Workplace Bullying Accountability Act, which was introduced in several states in 2025-2026 to emphasize employer prevention duties and internal response mechanisms over civil litigation.

== See also ==
- Abusive power and control
- Abusive supervision
- Brodie's Law (act)
- Bullying culture
- Counterproductive work behavior
- Culture of fear
- Going postal
- Kick the cat
- Kiss up kick down
- Machiavellianism in the workplace
- Narcissism in the workplace
- Narcissistic leadership
- Organizational citizenship behavior
- Organizational culture
- Psychopathy in the workplace
- Respectful workplace
- Toxic leader
- Workplace bullying
- Workplace incivility
