= Workplace incivility =

Uncivil behaviour in the workplace

Workplace incivility has been defined as low-intensity deviant behavior with ambiguous intent to harm the target. Uncivil behaviors are characteristically rude and discourteous, displaying a lack of regard for others. The authors hypothesize there is an "incivility spiral" in the workplace made worse by "asymmetric global interaction". Incivility is distinct from aggression. The reduction of workplace incivility is an area for industrial and organizational psychology research.

== Surveys on occurrence and effects ==
A summary of research conducted in Europe suggests that workplace incivility is common there. In research on more than 1000 U.S. civil service workers, Cortina, Magley, Williams, and Langhout (2001) found that more than 70% of the sample experienced workplace incivility in the past five years. Similarly, Laschinger, Leiter, Day, and Gilin found that among 612 staff nurses, 67.5% had experienced incivility from their supervisors and 77.6% had experienced incivility from their coworkers. In addition, they found that low levels of incivility along with low levels of burnout and an empowering work environment were significant predictors of nurses' experiences of job satisfaction and organizational commitment. Incivility was associated with occupational stress and reduced job satisfaction. Other research shows that workplace incivility relates to job stress, depression, and life satisfaction as well.

After conducting more than six hundred interviews with "employees, managers, and professionals in varying industries across the United States" and collecting "survey data from an additional sample of more than 1,200 employees, managers, and professionals representing all industrial categories in the United States and Canada", Pearson and Porath wrote in 2004 that "The grand conclusion: incivility does matter. Whether its costs are borne by targets, their colleagues, their organizations, their families, their friends outside work, their customers, witnesses to the interactions, or even the instigators themselves, there is a price to be paid for uncivil encounters among coworkers." Citing previous research (2000) Pearson writes that "more than half the targets waste work time worrying about the incident or planning how to deal with or avert future interactions with the instigator. Nearly 40 percent reduced their commitment to the organization; 20 percent told us that they reduced their work effort intentionally as a result of the incivility, and 10 percent of targets said that they deliberately cut back the amount of time they spent at work."

Studies suggest that social support can buffer the negative effects of workplace incivility. Individuals who felt emotionally and organizationally socially supported reported fewer negative consequences (less depression and job stress, and higher in job and life satisfaction) of workplace incivility compared to those who felt less supported. Research also suggests that the negative effects of incivility can be offset by feelings of organizational trust and high regard for one's workgroup.

== Subtle/covert examples ==
Examples at the more subtle end of the spectrum include:

- asking for input and then ignoring it
- "forgetting" to share credit for a collaborative work
- giving someone a "dirty look"
- interrupting others
- not listening
- side conversations during a formal business meeting/presentation
- speaking with a condescending tone
- waiting impatiently over someone's desk to gain their attention

== Overt examples ==
Somewhere between the extremes are numerous everyday examples of workplace rudeness and impropriety including:

- disrespecting workers by comments, gestures or proven behaviors (hostility) based on characteristics such as their race, religion, gender, etc. This is considered workplace discrimination.
- disrupting meetings
- emotional put-downs
- giving dirty looks or other negative eye contact (i.e. "hawk eyes" considered to be threatening in the culture of the United States)
- giving public reprimands
- giving the silent treatment
- insulting others
- making accusations about professional competence
- not giving credit where credit is due
- overruling decisions without giving a reason
- sending a nasty and demeaning note (hate mail)
- talking about someone behind his or her back
- undermining credibility in front of others

Other overt forms of incivility might include emotional tirades and losing one's temper.

== Corporate symptoms of long term incivility ==
1. Higher than normal employee turnover.
2. A large number of employee grievances and complaints.
3. Lost work time by employees calling in sick.
4. Increased consumer complaints.
5. Diminished productivity in terms of quality and quantity of work.
6. Cultural and communications barriers.
7. Lack of confidence in leadership.
8. Inability to adapt effectively to change.
9. Lack of individual accountability.
10. Lack of respect.

== Predicting ==
=== Gender ===
A number of studies have shown that women are more likely than men to experience workplace incivility and its associated negative outcomes. Research also shows that employees who witness incivility directed toward female coworkers have lower psychological wellbeing, physical health, and job satisfaction, which in turn relates lowered commitment toward the organization and higher job burnout and turnover intentions. Miner-Rubino and Cortina (2004) found that observing incivility toward women related to increased work withdrawal for both male and female employees, especially in work contexts where there were more men.

Other research shows that incivility directed toward same-gender coworkers tends to lead to more negative emotionality for observers. While both men and women felt anger, fear, and anxiety arising from same-gender incivility, women additionally reported higher levels of demoralization after witnessing such mistreatment. Furthermore, the negative effects of same-gender incivility were more pronounced for men observing men mistreating other men than for women observing women mistreating other women. Miner and Eischeid (2012) suggest this disparity reflects men perceiving uncivil behavior as a “clear affront to the power and status they have learned to expect for their group in interpersonal interactions.”

Motherhood status has also been examined as a possible predictor of being targeted for incivility in the workplace. This research shows that mothers with three or more children report more incivility than women with two, one, or zero children. Fathers, on the other hand, report more incivility than men without children, but still less than mothers. While motherhood appears to predict increases in workplace incivility, results also showed that the negative outcomes associated with incivility were mitigated by motherhood status. Fatherhood status, on the other hand, did not mitigate the relationship between incivility and outcomes. Childless women reported more workplace incivility than childless men, and showed a stronger relationship between incivility and negative outcomes than childless men, mothers, and fathers.

Cortina (2008) conceptualizes incivility that amounts to covert practices of sexism and/or racism in the workplace as selective incivility. For example, Ozturk and Berber (2022) demonstrate significant evidence of subtle racism in UK workplaces, where racialized professionals appear to be the main targets of selective incivility.

== Related notions ==
=== Workplace bullying ===
Workplace bullying overlaps to some degree with workplace incivility but tends to encompass more intense and typically repeated acts of disregard and rudeness. Negative spirals of increasing incivility between organizational members can result in bullying, but isolated acts of incivility are not conceptually bullying despite the apparent similarity in their form and content. In case of bullying, the intent of harm is less ambiguous, an unequal balance of power (both formal and informal) is more salient, and the target of bullying feels threatened, vulnerable and unable to defend himself or herself against negative recurring actions.

=== Petty authority ===
Another related notion is petty tyranny, which also involves a lack of consideration towards others, although petty tyranny is more narrowly defined as a profile of leaders and can also involve more severe forms of abuse of power and of authority.

== See also ==
- Abusive supervision
- Counterproductive work behavior
- Egocentrism
- Human resource development
- Industrial and organizational psychology
- Kiss up kick down
- Narcissism in the workplace
- Occupational health and safety
- Occupational health psychology
- Occupational stress
- Psychopathy in the workplace
- Sexual harassment
- Toxic workplace
- Workplace bullying
- Workplace harassment
