= Shooting the messenger =

Metaphor referring to blaming the carrier of unwelcome information

"Shooting the messenger" (also "killing the messenger", "attacking the messenger", "blaming the bearer of bad tidings", or "blaming the doom monger") is a metaphoric phrase used to describe the act of blaming the bearer of bad news, despite the bearer or messenger having no direct responsibility for the bad news or its consequences.

Until the advent of modern telecommunication, messages were usually delivered by human envoys. For example, in war, a messenger would be sent from one camp to another. If the message was unfitting, the receiver might blame the messenger for such bad news and take their anger out on them.

== History ==
An analog of the phrase can come from breaching an unwritten code of conduct in war, in which a commanding officer was expected to receive and send back emissaries or diplomatic envoys sent by the enemy unharmed. During the early Warring States period of China, the concept of chivalry and virtue prevented the executions of messengers sent by opposing sides.

In Ancient Greek theater, Sophocles' play Antigone includes the line "no one loves the messenger who brings bad news" or "no man delights in the bearer of bad news" (Greek: στέργει γὰρ οὐδεὶς ἄγγελον κακῶν ἐπῶν, romanized: stérgei gàr oudeìs ángelon kakōn epōn). In Euripides' play The Bacchae, a messenger from Cithaeron requests the right to freely speak before informing Pentheus, the mythical king of Thebes, that the latter's mother has been brainwashed into the Cult of Dionysus.

Plutarch's Lives includes a similar sentiment: "The first messenger, that gave notice of Lucullus' coming was so far from pleasing Tigranes that, he had his head cut off for his pains; and no man dared to bring further information. Without any intelligence at all, Tigranes sat while war was already blazing around him, giving ear only to those who flattered him".

The sentiment that one should not kill the messenger was expressed by Shakespeare in Henry IV, Part 2 (1598), and in Antony and Cleopatra Cleopatra threatens to treat the messenger's eyes as balls when told Antony has married another, eliciting the response "Gracious madam, I that do bring the news made not the match."

The term also applied to a town crier, an officer of the court who made public pronouncements in the name of the ruling monarch, and often including bad news. Harming a town crier was considered treason.

== Current application ==
A modern version of "shooting the messenger" can be perceived when someone blames the media for presenting bad news about a favored cause, person, organization, etc. "Shooting the messenger" may be a time-honored emotional response to unwanted news, but it is not a very effective method of remaining well-informed.

Getting rid of the messenger may be a tactical move, but danger found in nondisclosure may result in either hostile responses or negative feedback from others. "People learn very quickly where this is the case, and will studiously avoid giving any negative feedback; thus the 'Emperor' continues with the self-delusion....Obviously this is not a recipe for success". Barbara Ehrenreich in Bright-sided/Smile or Die argued that a culture of "thinking positive" so as to "purge 'negative people' from the ranks...[fed into] the bubble-itis" of the 2000s.

Reactions to the whistleblowing organization WikiLeaks led to calls not to shoot the messenger.

== See also ==
- Diplomatic immunity – Form of legal immunity and a policy held between governments and tribunals
- Egodystonic – Behaviour or feelings inconsistent with self-image
- Guilt by association – Formal logical fallacy conflating the properties of things with non-relevant connection
- Kick the cat – Metaphor about frustration within an organization
- Own goal – Goal scored against a player's own team
- Presumption of guilt – Presumption that a person is guilty of a crime
- Scapegoating – Practice of singling out any party for undeserved negative treatment or blame
- Ad hominem – Attacking the person rather than their argument
- Tu quoque – Fallacy regarding hypocrisy
