= Abusive supervision =

Form of workplace bullying by a supervisor

Abusive supervision is most commonly studied in the context of the workplace, although it can arise in other areas such as in the household and at school. Abusive supervision has been investigated as major cause of negative outcomes in managing employees. Studies have been conducted to investigate the link between abusive supervision and different workplace events.

== Workplace bullying ==
Abusive supervision overlaps with workplace bullying in the workplace context. Research suggests that 75% of workplace bullying incidents are perpetrated by hierarchically superior agents. Abusive supervision differs from related constructs such as supervisor bullying and undermining in that it does not describe the intentions or objectives of the supervisor.

== Workplace deviance ==
Workplace deviance is closely related to abusive supervision. Abusive supervision is defined as the "subordinates' perceptions of the extent to which their supervisors engage in the sustained display of hostile verbal and nonverbal behaviors". This could be when supervisors ridicule their employees, give them the silent treatment, remind them of past failures, fail to give proper credit, wrongfully assign blame or blow up in fits of temper. It may seem like employees who are abused by their supervisor will either directly retaliate or withdraw by quitting the job but in reality many strike out against their employer by engaging in organizational deviant behaviors. Since employees control many of the organization's resources, they often use or abuse anything they can. This abuse of resources may come in the form of time, office supplies, raw materials, finished products or the services that they provide. This usually occurs in two steps. First step is that commitment is destroyed and employees stop caring about the welfare of the employer. The second step is that the abused employee will get approval (normally implied) of their coworkers to commit deviant acts.

Workplace experiences may fuel the worker to act out. Research has been conducted demonstrating that the perception of not being respected is one of the main causes for workplace deviance; workplace dissatisfaction is also a factor. According to Bolin and Heatherly, "dissatisfaction results in a higher incidence of minor offenses, but does not necessarily lead to severe offense". An employee who is less satisfied with his or her work may become less productive, as their needs are not met. In the workplace, "frustration, injustices and threats to self are primary antecedents to employee deviance". Although workplace deviance does occur, the behavior is not universal. There are two preventive measures that business owners can use to protect themselves. The first is strengthening the employee's commitment by reacting strongly to abusive supervision so that the employee knows that the behavior is not accepted. Holding the employee at high esteem by reminding them of their importance, or setting up programs that communicate concern for the employee may also strengthen employee commitment. Providing a positive ethical climate can also help. Employers can do this by having a clear code of conduct that is applied to both managers and employees alike.

=== Dark Triad ===
In research, the presence of Machiavellianism, psychopathy, and narcissism was positively associated with subordinate perceptions of abusive supervision.

== Social undermining ==
Social undermining can arise from abusive supervision, such as when a supervisor uses negative actions, and it leads to "flow downhill"; a supervisor is perceived as abusive.

Research has shown that "abusive supervision is a subjective assessment made by subordinates regarding their supervisors" behavior towards them over a period of time. For example, abusive supervision includes a "boss demeaning, belittling, or invading privacy of the subordinate".

Hostile attribution bias is an extra punitive mentality where individuals tend to project blame on others. Researchers wanted to see how hostile attribution bias can moderate the relationship between perceptions of psychological contract violation and subordinates' perceptions of abusive supervision. Undermining does arise with abusive supervision, which affects families and aggression; they believe that there is a stronger positive relationship between experiences of psychological contract violation and subordinates' reports of abuse. It suggests that when someone has a negative work environment, it will affect their emotional training ground where this would result in negative home encounters. The findings from this study show that abused subordinates' family members reported a higher incidence of undermining in their home. When this occurs, complications arise at both home and work. Workplace abuse may be spawning negative interpersonal relations in the home, which may contribute to a downward spiral of relationships in both spheres.

When a subordinate is being abused, it can lead to negative affect towards their family, where the subordinate starts undermining their family members. The undermining can arise from displaced aggression, which is "redirection of a [person's] harm doing behavior from a primary to a secondary target" (Tedeschi & Norman, 1985, p. 30). Family undermining arises from a negative work environment: when someone above a person puts them down, that person starts to think that one should be put down by one's family members.

== Context and outcome correlates ==
Abusive supervision has been investigated primarily in corporate and education contexts.

In the corporate context, abusive supervision has been found to be negatively related to followers' attitudes towards the leader, job satisfaction, job-related attitudes, justice, commitment, positive self-evaluation, and well-being. In addition, such corporate abusive supervision is positively associated with undesirable consequences such as follower resistance, turnover intention, counterproductive work behaviour, negative affectivity, and stress.

In the education context, abusive supervision has been investigated in instructor–student relationships, and these studies found that such supervision is adversely related to anxiety and psychological well-being.

== See also ==
- Controlling behavior in relationships
- Bullying culture
- Culture of fear
- Gaslighting
- Kick the cat
- Kiss up kick down
- Micromanagement
- Narcissism in the workplace
- Occupational health psychology
- Overwork
- Petty tyranny
- Psychopathy in the workplace
- Toxic leader
- Toxic workplace
