= RUMAG =

Dutch media company and apparel brand

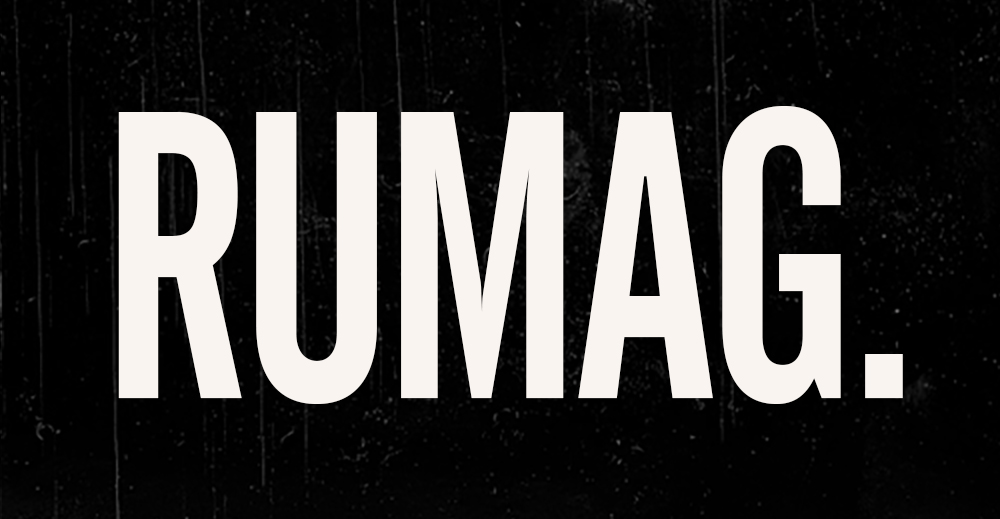

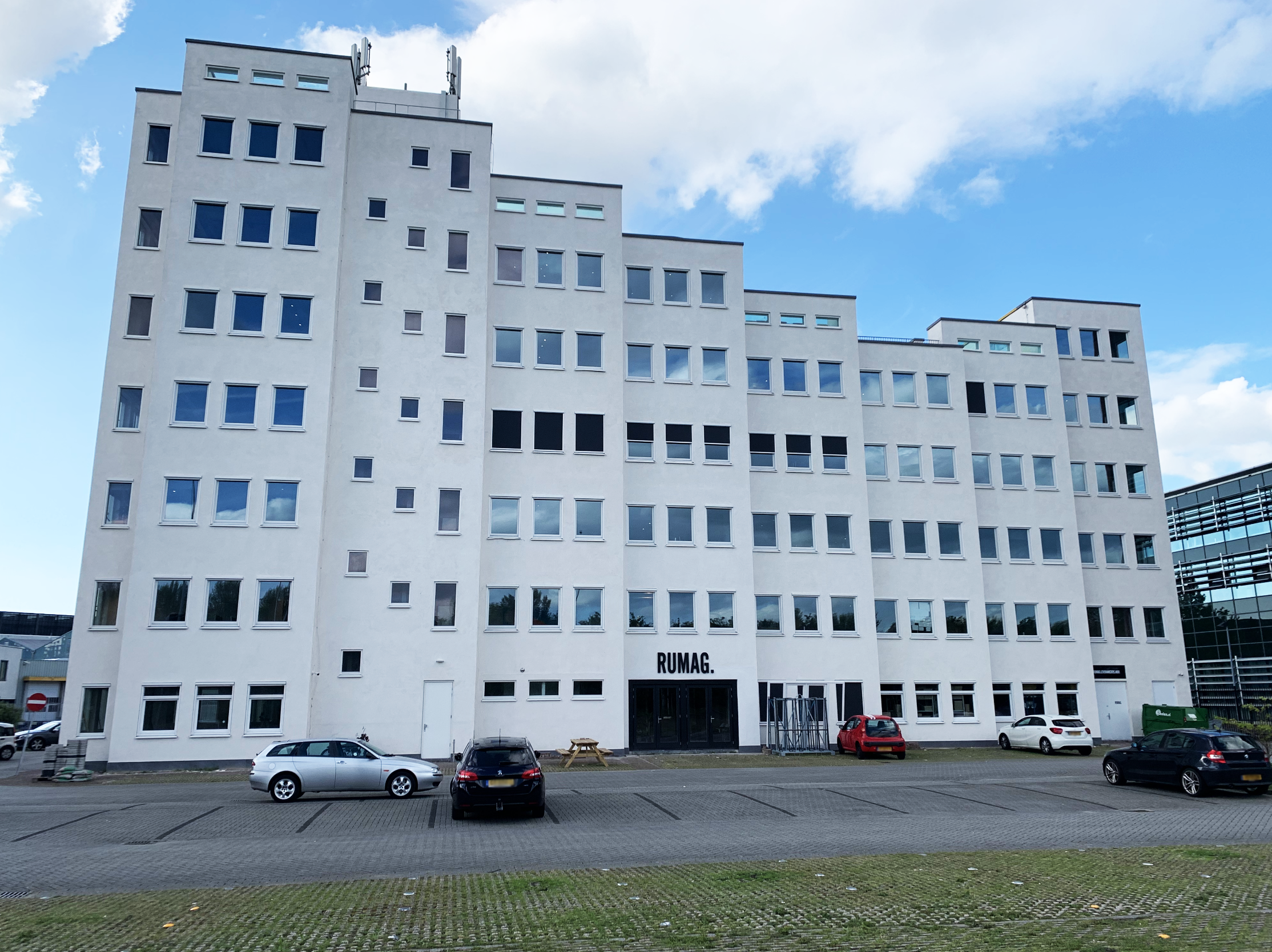
- Type: Private
- Industry: Media, Fashion, Entertainment
- Founded: 2014
- Founder: Thijs van der Heide
- Headquarters: Amsterdam, The Netherlands
- Area served: The Netherlands
- Key people: Thijs van der Heide, Danny Membre, Rene Watzema
- Number of employees: 25
- Website: www.rumag.nl

RUMAG (which is short for Rude Magazine) was a Dutch media company and apparel brand based in Amsterdam, The Netherlands.

== History ==
The company was founded in October 2014 by Thijs van der Heide and started out as a blog but later their posts were substituted with quotes and also shared on Facebook. The name Rude Magazine was shortened RUMAG and under this name Van der Heide started producing quotes and slogans that are humorous, sexually tinted, and rude. Most of these quotes are not originally produced by RUMAG but taken from various social media outlets or other sources. The RUMAG CEO does not deny this and stated in a televised debate that this practice does not infringe copyright law and that it is a grey zone for the law.

In October 2015, former nightclub owner Danny Membre and his partner sold their nightclub, after which Membre joined RUMAG as a partner and becoming part-owner of the company.

In June 2016, RUMAG became a publisher with the VICE Digital Network and launched their own media platform. In December 2016, Dutch vlogger and comedian Nienke Plas joined the company.

== Awards ==
Year	Price	Category	Result
2017	Best Social Awards	Best Entertainment Page	Won
2018	European Excellence Awards	Best European Viral Communications Campaign	Won
