= Scapegoating =

Practice of singling out any party for undeserved negative treatment or blame

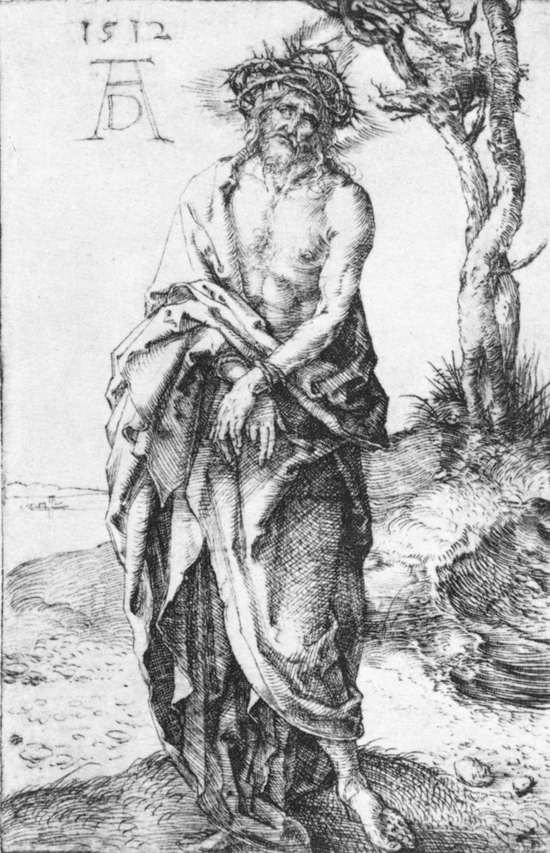
Schmerzensmann (lit. 'man of sorrows'), drypoint by Albrecht Dürer 1512 depicting Jesus Christ

Scapegoating, sometimes called playing the blame game, is the practice of singling out a person or group for unmerited blame and consequent negative treatment. Scapegoating may be conducted by individuals against individuals (e.g., "he did it, not me!"), individuals against groups (e.g., "I couldn't see anything because of all the tall people"), groups against individuals (e.g., "He was the reason our team didn't win"), and groups against groups.

A scapegoat may be an adult, child, sibling, employee, or peer, or it may be an ethnic, political or religious group, or a country. A whipping boy, identified patient, or fall guy are forms of scapegoat.

Scapegoating is distinct from buck passing. While scapegoating mainly centers around blame, buck passing revolves around passing responsibility between individuals. Instead of being a negatively cornered target, an individual involved in buck passing actively partakes in the act of shifting responsibility and may be able to deflect blame.

== Etymology ==
Scapegoating has its origins in the scapegoat ritual of atonement described in chapter 16 of the Book of Leviticus, in which a goat (or ass) is released into the wilderness bearing all the sins of the community, which have been placed on the goat's head by a priest.

== At the individual level ==
A medical definition of scapegoating is:

Process in which the mechanisms of projection or displacement are used in focusing feelings of aggression, hostility, frustration, etc., upon another individual or group; the amount of blame being unwarranted. Scapegoating is a hostile tactic often employed to characterize an entire group of individuals according to the unethical or immoral conduct of a small number of individuals belonging to that group. Scapegoating relates to guilt by association and stereotyping.

Scapegoated groups throughout history have included almost every imaginable group of people: genders, religions, people of different races, nations, or sexual orientations, people with different political beliefs, or people differing in behaviour from the majority. However, scapegoating may also be applied to organizations, such as governments, corporations, or various political groups.

=== Its archetype ===
Jungian analyst Sylvia Brinton Perera situates its mythology of shadow and guilt. Individuals experience it at the archetypal level. As an ancient social process to rid a community of its past evil deeds and reconnect it to the sacred realm, the scapegoat appeared in a biblical rite, which involved two goats and the pre-Judaic, chthonic god Azazel. In the modern scapegoat complex, however, "the energy field has been radically broken apart" and the libido "split off from consciousness". Azazel's role is deformed into an accuser of the scapegoated victim.

Blame for breaking a perfectionist moral code, for instance, might be measured out by aggressive scapegoaters. Themselves often wounded, the scapegoaters can be sadistic, superego accusers with brittle personas, who have driven their own shadows underground from where such are projected onto the victim. The scapegoated victim may then live in a hell of felt unworthiness, retreating from consciousness, burdened by shadow and transpersonal guilt, and hiding from the pain of self-understanding. Therapy includes modeling self-protective skills for the victim's battered ego, and guidance in the search for inner integrity, to find the victim's own voice.

=== Projection ===
Unwanted thoughts and feelings can be unconsciously projected onto another who becomes a scapegoat for one's own problems. This concept can be extended to projection by groups. In this case the chosen individual, or group, becomes the scapegoat for the group's problems. "Political agitation in all countries is full of such projections, just as much as the backyard gossip of little groups and individuals." Swiss psychiatrist Carl Jung considered indeed that "there must be some people who behave in the wrong way; they act as scapegoats and objects of interest for the normal ones".

== Scapegoat theory of intergroup conflict ==
The scapegoat theory of intergroup conflict provides an explanation for the correlation between times of relative economic despair and increases in prejudice and violence toward outgroups. Studies of anti-black violence (racist violence) in the southern United States between 1882 and 1930 show a correlation between poor economic conditions and outbreaks of violence (e.g. lynchings) against black people. The correlation between the price of cotton (the principal product of the area at that time) and the number of lynchings of black men by whites ranged from −0.63 to −0.72, suggesting that a poor economy induced white people to take out their frustrations by attacking an outgroup.

In Holocaust studies, scapegoating is considered a key propaganda technique used by the Nazis in the lead up to the mass killings of Jews. In Hitler's Willing Executioners (1996), historian Daniel Jonah Goldhagen argued that the Holocaust was enabled not only by Nazi officials but also by widespread antisemitism among ordinary Germans.

Scapegoating as a group necessitates that ingroup members settle on one specific target to blame for their problems.

In management, scapegoating is a known practice in which a lower staff employee is blamed for the mistakes of senior executives. This is often due to lack of accountability in upper management.

== Scapegoat mechanism ==
Literary critic and philosopher Kenneth Burke coined and described the expression scapegoat mechanism in his books Permanence and Change (1935), and A Grammar of Motives (1945). These works influenced some philosophical anthropologists, such as Ernest Becker and René Girard.

Girard developed the concept much more extensively as an interpretation of human culture. In Girard's view, it is humankind, not God, who has need for various forms of atoning violence. Humans are driven by desire for that which another has or wants (mimetic desire). This causes a triangulation of desire and results in conflict between the desiring parties. This mimetic contagion increases to a point where society is at risk; it is at this point that the scapegoat mechanism is triggered. This is the point where one person is singled out as the cause of the trouble and is expelled or killed by the group. This person is the scapegoat. Social order is restored as people are contented that they have solved the cause of their problems by removing the scapegoated individual, and the cycle begins again.

Scapegoating serves as a psychological relief for a group of people. Girard contends that this is what happened in the narrative of Jesus of Nazareth, the central figure in Christianity. The difference between the scapegoating of Jesus and others, Girard believes, is that in the resurrection of Jesus from the dead, he is shown to be an innocent victim; humanity is thus made aware of its violent tendencies and the cycle is broken. Thus Girard's work is significant as a reconstruction of the Christus Victor atonement theory.

== See also ==
- Bullying – Abuse or intimidation of others
- Charivari – Folk custom shaming a community member
- Consciousness of guilt – Legal evidence of a guilty conscience
- Dehumanization – Behavior or process that undermines individuality of and in others
- Divine retribution – Supernatural punishment by a deity
- Fall guy – Person who is wrongly blamed for a bad outcome
- False accusation – Claim or allegation of wrongdoing that is untrue
- Frontier justice – Extrajudicial punishment
- Frustration–aggression hypothesis – Theory of aggression
- The Golden Bough – 1890 book by James Frazer
- Identified patient – Member of dysfunctional family
- Hazing – Abusive, dangerous initiation rituals
- Human sacrifice – Ritualistic killing, usually as an offering
- Kick the cat – Metaphor about frustration within an organization
- Kiss up kick down – Form of social malfunction
- Mobbing – Bullying of an individual by a group
- Moral panic – Fear that some evil threatens society
- Presumption of guilt – Presumption that a person is guilty of a crime
- Sacrificial lamb – Person sacrificed for the common good
- Shooting the messenger – Metaphor referring to blaming the carrier of unwelcome information
- Sin-eater – Person who consumes a ritual meal for the deceased
- Smear campaign – Effort to damage someone's reputation
- Social stigma – Type of discrimination or disapproval
- Stereotype – Generalized belief about people
- Victim blaming – Social phenomenon
- Victimisation – Process of being or subjected to a victim
- Witch-hunt – Search for witchcraft or subversive activity
