= Marcia Lynn Whicker =

American political scientist (1950–1999)

- Born: 1950
- Died: March 23, 1999 (aged 48–49)
- Education: University of North Carolina at Chapel Hill; University of Tennessee; University of Kentucky; Midlands Technical College
- Scientific career
- Fields: Political science
- Workplaces: Virginia Commonwealth University; University of South Carolina; Temple University; Wayne State University; Rutgers University

Marcia Lynn Whicker (1950 – March 23, 1999) was an American political scientist. Whicker was a professor of political science at Rutgers University, where she served a term as the Chair of the Department of Public Administration. She specialized in the study of executive and legislative leaders in American politics, coining the idea of a toxic leader, and also focused on the ways that policy outcomes are shaped by governing institutions. Whicker was one of the first political scientists to research the use of computer simulations in the study of political phenomena.

== Education and positions ==
Whicker was born in 1950. She attended the University of North Carolina at Chapel Hill, where she obtained a B.A. degree in political science and economics. Whicker then studied at the University of Tennessee, where she obtained an M.P.A. degree, and she also completed an M.S. degree in economics from the University of Kentucky. She continued to study at the University of Kentucky, graduating with a PhD in political science in 1976. While she was a graduate student, Whicker worked as a dancer. Whicker was a Congressional Fellow of the American Political Science Association in 1975, and in that capacity she worked with Massachusetts member of congress Joe Moakley.

Whicker was a member of the political science faculties at Virginia Commonwealth University, the University of South Carolina, Temple University, and Wayne State University, before becoming a professor of political science at Rutgers University. While working as a professor at the University of South Carolina, Whicker studied electronic engineering at Midlands Technical College and completed an associate degree there. Whicker served as the Chair of the Department of Public Administration in the Graduate School at Rutgers University beginning in 1994. After she died, Rutgers created the Marcia Lynn Whicker Memorial Endowed Scholarship for M.P.A. students in her memory.

== Research ==
Whicker was an author or an editor of 16 books during her career, in addition to dozens of journal articles and book chapters. Whicker's research largely focused on how the institutions of governance affect policies, and the role of executives and legislative leaders in American politics. Whicker's 1996 book Toxic leaders: When organizations go bad coined the concept of a toxic leader, which describes those who abuse their position of control over an organization and leave their supporters and organization in a worse situation than before. Whicker also conducted innovative research in political methodology; for example, in 1991 she and Lee Sigelman co-authored a book on the use of computer simulations in political science, called Computer simulation applications: An introduction. Whicker's other research included work on the roles of race and gender in political campaigns, state-level political leadership, and the state of the American constitutional system. In 1993, Whicker co-authored the book Getting tenure with Jennie Jacobs Kronenfeld and Ruth Ann Strickland, to assist professors without academic tenure in understanding the tenure process. In addition to her research, Whicker also served as an editor of academic journals including the Presidential Studies Quarterly.

== Selected works ==
- The constitution under pressure: A time for change, coauthored with Raymond Moore and Ruth Ann Strickland (1987)
- Computer simulation applications: An introduction, coauthored with Lee Sigelman (1991)
- Getting tenure, coauthored with Jennie Jacobs Kronenfeld and Ruth Ann Strickland (1993)
- Legislative leadership in the American states, coauthored with Malcolm E. Jewell (1994)
- Toxic leaders: When organizations go bad (1996)
