= Kiss up, kick down =

Form of social malfunction

Kiss up, kick down is a neologism used to describe the situation where middle-level employees in an organization are polite and flattering to superiors but abusive to subordinates. The term is believed to have originated in the US, with the first documented use having occurred in 1993. The concept can be applied to any social interaction where one person believes they have power over another person and believes that another person has power over them.

== Examples of use ==
The Bulletin of the Atomic Scientists described Robert McNamara, an American business executive and the eighth United States Secretary of Defense, as a classic case of the "kiss up, kick down" personality in August 1993.

On day 2 of the Senate confirmation hearings, April 12, 2005, for John R. Bolton, a Bush nomination for the US representative to the UN, the Senate panel focused on allegations that Bolton pressured intelligence analysts. Former State Department intelligence chief Carl W. Ford Jr. characterized Bolton as a "kiss-up, kick-down sort of guy".

Calum Paton, Professor of Health Policy at Keele University, has described "kiss up, kick down" as a prevalent feature of the UK National Health Service culture. He raised this point when giving evidence at the Stafford Hospital scandal public inquiry in 2011, saying that credit was centralised and blame devolved: "Kiss up kick down means that your middle level people will kiss-up, they will please their masters, political or otherwise, and they will kick down to blame somebody else when things go wrong."

== Blame in organizations ==
The flow of blame in an organization may be a primary indicator of that organization's robustness and integrity. Blame flowing downwards, from management to staff, or laterally between professionals or partner organizations, indicates organizational failure. In a blame culture, problem-solving is replaced by blame avoidance. Confused roles and responsibilities also contribute to a blame culture. Blame coming from the top generates "fear, malaise, errors, accidents, and passive-aggressive responses from the bottom", with those at the bottom feeling powerless and lacking emotional safety. Employees have expressed that organizational blame culture made them fear prosecution for errors, accidents and thus unemployment, which may make them more reluctant to report accidents, since trust is crucial to encourage accident reporting. This makes it less likely that weak indicators of safety threats get picked up, thus preventing the organization from taking adequate measures to prevent minor problems from escalating into uncontrollable situations. Several issues identified in organizations with a blame culture contradicts high reliability organizations best practices.

=== Kick up, kiss down ===
Kick up, kiss down has been suggested as a viable more healthy dynamic. Blame flowing upwards in a hierarchy, Weinberg argues, proves that superiors can take responsibility for their orders to their inferiors, and supply them with the resources required to do their jobs.

== See also ==
- Bullying culture – Abuse or intimidation of others
- Carrot and stick – Metaphor for the use of punishment and reward
- Culture of fear – Arrangement in which fear of retribution is pervasive
- Displaced aggression – Anger directed at something other than the stimuli
- Kick the cat – Metaphor about frustration within an organization
- Managing up and managing down – Management terminology
- Mushroom management – Company with dysfunctional communication between managers and employees
- Occupational health psychology – Health and Safety psychology
- Toxic workplace – Informal term for a workplace marked by infighting and personal conflict
