= Self-blame (psychology) =

Type of cognitive process

Self-blame is a cognitive process in which an individual attributes the occurrence of a stressful event to oneself. The direction of blame often has implications for individuals' emotions and behaviors during and following stressful situations. Self-blame is a common reaction to stressful events and has certain effects on how individuals adapt. Types of self-blame are hypothesized to contribute to depression, and self-blame is a component of self-directed emotions like guilt and self-disgust. Because of self-blame's commonality in response to stress and its role in emotion, self-blame should be examined using psychology's perspectives on stress and coping.

== Self-blame and stress ==
While conceptualizations of stress have differed, the most dominant accounts in current psychology are appraisal-based models of stress. These models define stress as a reaction to a certain type of subjective appraisal, done by an individual, of the circumstances he or she is in. Specifically, stress occurs when an individual decides that a factor in the environment puts demands on the individual beyond his or her current ability to deal with it. The process of rating situations as demanding or nondemanding is called appraisal, and this process can occur quickly and without conscious awareness. Appraisal models of stress are sometimes called "interactional" because the occurrence of stress depends on an interaction between characteristics of the person, especially goals, and the environmental situation. Only if the individual perceives a situation to threaten his or her goals does stress occur. This structure explains the fact that individuals often differ in their emotional and stress responses when they are presented with similar situations. Stress does not come from events themselves, but from the conflict of the event with an individual's goals. While researchers disagree about the time-course of appraisals, how appraisals are made, and the degree to which individuals differ in their appraisals, appraisal-models of stress are dominant in psychology. Appraisals may occur without conscious awareness. Stress itself is a systemic psychological state that includes a subjective "feel" and a motivational-component (the individual desires to reduce stress); some researchers consider stress to be a subset of or a closely related system to emotions, which likewise depend on appraisal and motivate behavior.

Once this appraisal has occurred, actions taken to reduce stress constitute coping processes. Coping can involve changes to the situation-environment relationship (changing the situation or the goals that led to stress appraisal), reducing the emotional consequences of a stress appraisal, or avoiding thinking about the stressful situation. Categorizations of types of coping vary between researchers. Coping strategies differ in their effects on subjective well-being; for example, positive reappraisal is consistently found to be a correlate of higher subjective-well being, while distraction from stressors is typically a negative correlate of well-being. Coping behaviors constitute the moderating factor between events and circumstances on one hand and psychological outcomes, like well-being or mental disorders, on the other. Causal attributions of the event are a way to deal with the stress of an event, and so self-blame is a type of coping. During and after traumatic events, individuals' appraisals affect how stressful the event is, their beliefs on what caused the event, meanings they may derive from the event, and changes they make in their future behavior.

== Theories of self-blame ==
=== Characterological and behavioral self-blame ===
A classification of self-blame into characterological and behavioral types has been proposed to distinguish whether individuals are putting blame on changeable or unchangeable causes. This division, first proposed by Janoff-Bulman, defines behavioral self-blame (BSB) as causal attribution of an event's occurrence to specific, controllable actions that the individual took. Characterological self-blame (CSB), on the other hand, is attribution of blame to factors of the self that are uncontrollable and stable over time (e.g. "I am the type of person that gets taken advantage of"). CSB attributions are harder to change than behavioral attributions of blame. The development of these categories comes from observation of depressed individuals; sufferers often display feelings of helplessness and lack of control while simultaneously blaming their choices for negative occurrences, resulting in the so-called "paradox of depression". From an outside perspective, it would seem that blaming one's actions implies that the individual can choose better in the future. However, if this blame is towards uncontrollable characteristics (CSB), not choosable actions (BSB), the factors resulting in a negative outcome were uncontrollable. BSB and CSB are thus proposed to be activities that, while related, are distinct and differ in their effects when used as coping processes.

Empirical findings support the existence of the behavioral/characterological distinction in self-blame. For one, BSB is much more common than CSB. Tilghman-Osbourne, 2008) A factor analyses of individuals' attributions of blame and their ability to predict psychological symptoms have identified two clusters of self-blame: a factor of blame for the type of victim, correlated with self-contempt and self-disgust; and a factor of blame towards poor judgment or choices of the victim, correlated with guilt. These factors closely correspond to CSB and BSB definitions, and so the study provides some theoretical support that individuals assign self-blame differently to unchoosable characteristics and choices they have made. Research has also compared CSB and BSB to moral emotions that individuals have, such as guilt and shame. CSB and shame had convergent validity to predict depressive symptoms in adolescents. On the other hand, guilt and BSB did not show convergent validity, and some evidence suggests further subtypes of guilt and BSB. Factor analysis of adolescents self-blame from bullying showed differences between attributions of CSB and BSB.

However, though distinct types of self-blame have been identified, evidence distinguishing their effectiveness as coping have been mixed. Evidence on the effects of BSB is mixed. Both CSB and BSB predicted depressive symptoms in rape victims, though CSB also had a higher relationship with future fear, and both types correlated positively with symptoms of psychological disorder in domestic abuse victims. CSB mediated the relationship between bullying victimization and anxiety, loneliness, and low-self worth in middle-school students, while BSB had no positive or negative effect on well-being. Other studies did not find significant effects of self-blame on psychological outcomes. One study found that BSB and CSB had a concurrent relationship with depressive symptoms, but no role to predict depressive symptoms in the future, while another found that only CSB concurrently correlated with depressive symptoms. One study of Ullman and colleagues found no effect of CSB to predict PTSD or depressive symptoms from sexual abuse. Parents of children killed by sudden infant death syndrome showed no predictive relationship of BSB or CSB and future distress.

Many studies, including recent ones, continue to treat self-blame as a unified factor. Studies that conflate the terms of self-blame tend to find negative psychological impacts; the notable exception is the seminal Bulman & Wortman study of accident paralysis victims, which noted the adaptive effect of self-blame to improve victims' recovery.

=== Perceived control ===
The feeling of a person that he or she can change a situation with their actions is called perceived control. Appraisals of control over a stressor have been consistently found to influence the type of coping used. If individuals believe a stressful situation is changeable, they will likely use problem-focused coping, or attempts to eliminate the stressor. Appraisal that stressors are unchangeable will lead individuals to cope by avoiding the stressor or minimizing negative consequences of the stressor. Researchers have hypothesized that perceived control leads to more effective coping and better understanding of one's capabilities. Self-blame has a relationship with control. If individuals blame their past, controllable actions (BSB), they may believe they can change actions to influence the future. In other words, BSB could lead to higher perceived control, and researchers have suggested this makes BSB an adaptive form of coping. Self-blame might lead to an increase in perceived control and a decrease in the belief of random chance, which would motivate other coping strategies in turn. On the other hand, CSB could still be a maladaptive form of coping because uncontrollable characteristics (e.g. gender, personality) are responsible for negative events.

Research on perceived control as a mediator of the relationship between self-blame, non-self-blame coping strategies, and well-being outcomes has shown mixed results. A study of abusive relationship victims found that CSB or BSB had no relationship with perceived control. BSB had a negative relationship with perceived control in another study; additionally, BSB correlated with problem avoidance and social withdrawal, while perceived control correlated with adaptive forms of coping like cognitive restructuring. Why does BSB not seem to have an effect to increase perceived control? After all, BSB involves blaming controllable actions for outcomes, suggesting that events are within the realm of control. In bereaved parents, attributions of self-blame declined over time after bereavement, but attribution of events to chance remained stable. These findings suggest that attributions of responsibility are not zero-sum quantities. Blaming oneself does not necessarily exclude acknowledgement of the power of other individuals and chance. In this way, self-blame seems less likely to result in perceived control; even when an individual self-attributes causal responsibility, they may yet believe that other factors could interfere with their control. These data suggest that self-blame is maladaptive across the board.

Perceived control itself, however, did predict better adjustment through high effect of perceived control to predict lower psychological symptoms, but additionally, it might be difficult to use one type of self-blame without using both types. For the hypothesis that self-blame motivates other types of adaptive coping, self-blame negatively correlated with positive reappraisal, focusing on planning, and positively correlated with rumination, each of which are typically-maladaptive coping strategies. CSB did correlate significantly with avoidance/substance coping and to reduce emotional regulation. The lack of problem-focused coping suggests that individuals had low perceived control. Individuals that blame powerful groups in society for occurrence of sexual assault showed negative effects on perceived control and psychological well-being

=== Depression and self-blame ===
The hopelessness theory of depression proposes that depression is caused by two variables: attribution of negative events to stable and global causes, and other cognitive factors like low self-esteem (Krith, 2014). CSB attributes occurrence of events to stable aspects of the individual that are not controllable. CSB attributions seem likely to cause helplessness, since individuals believe they are powerless to control the characteristics that lead to negative events. On the other hand, BSB has an indeterminate effect under hopelessness theory, since BSB attributes events to behaviors that can be controlled to produce better outcomes. These theories of attributional style and stress and coping have similar predictions to Janoff-Bulman's BSB/CSB distinction. Depression occurs when individuals feel that they cannot control the future. The CSB/BSB distinction also corresponds to Dweck's distinction between ability and effort attributions. Effort attributions are when individuals assign success or failure to the hard work and other controllable factors, while ability attributions assign outcomes to internal, stable characteristics, like intelligence. Dweck noted that individuals that believe outcomes are uncontrollable are more likely to be debilitated by setbacks, procrastinate or avoid stressors, and show greater stress responses. In short, theorists believe that the type of cause to which events are attributed is a central factor of effectiveness of blame.

Exploratory neuroscientific evidence has found a distinct sign of connectivity abnormality associated with general self-blame. Evidence suggests that major depressive disorder creates vulnerability to depression that lasts years after the cessation of depressive episodes. One of the mechanisms of this "scar theory" of depression is proposed to be increased likelihood to perform self-blame. Self-blaming biases are present in patients with remitted depression, and these biases are associated with risk of recurrence of MDD. Researchers used functional magnetic resonance imaging (fMRI) to examine brain regions and connections associated with self-blame. Abnormal activation was demonstrated in subgenual cingulate cortex and septal region (SCSR) in currently depressed individuals, but in other situations as well: previously-depressed individuals showed differences in brain activity while feeling guilt compared to always-healthy controls. Also, the amount of connection abnormality in these regions was predictive of depression recurrence. These data suggest that depression episodes change the quality of self-blame, making individuals vulnerable to depression recurrence.

=== Counterfactual thinking ===
Theories on counterfactual thinking could explain the confusing evidence regarding self-blame and psychological adjustment. Counterfactual thinking involves the consideration of alternative possibilities that could have occurred, like how a stressful event or loss could have been avoided. Self-blame involves assessment of causal responsibility to certain variables, so it involves counterfactual thinking about what changes could have avoided the incident. Theories on counterfactual thinking have proposed that the direction of the counterfactual determines the psychological effect of the thinking. Upward counterfactuals, thinking about ways in which things could have gone better but did not, are linked with negative affect and regret. Downward counterfactuals, thinking about ways in which things could have gone worse, are linked with positive affect. Self-blame that assesses how a negative event could be avoided would be upward counterfactual thinking, so this theory hypothesizes that self-blame results in negative affect and poor adjustment. A study of counterfactual thinking found that it was associated with self-blame, which was negatively associated with psychological well-being in turn, but did not distinguish between types of self-blame.

A study by Frazier, Mortensen, & Steward emphasizes the importance of the time-frame in which an individual perceives himself or herself to have control. The study tracked participants longitudinally after they experienced sexual assault. Belief that controllable actions led to the assault, or BSB, predicted worse adjustment. On the other hand, belief in current control led to better adjustment.

=== Conservation of resources model ===
The conservation of resources (COR) model is a theory of stress and coping that attempts to explain individual differences in coping attributions. Differences between individuals in coping can be large, even when the stressors and relevant goals of the individual are the same. This gap in coping is attributed to differences in the resources to which the individuals have access. Individuals can invest resources to protect themselves from loss. Oftentimes, stressful situations involve the possibility of loss or gain of resources. Concretely, resources include psychological well-being, systems of social support, intellectual ability, resilience, and more. Under the COR system, maladaptive forms of coping are often used because the individual lacks sufficient resources to perform adaptive forms of coping.

The COR model, combined with evidence suggesting the ease of self-blame compared to other blame strategies, would likely interpret self-blame as a coping strategy used when resources are lacking. Self-blame appears to be a "first resort" to victims of trauma. Even when in situations where moral responsibility would seem to fall upon others, like crime victimization or accidents, individuals often seek hypotheticals in their own behavior that could have avoided the stressful event before they look in others' behavior. This tendency might be attributable to the greater ease of thinking about one's own behavior than others. It might also require social support resources to provide affirmation that the victim's actions were not the cause of the crime. Empirically, both CSB and BSB have been found to concurrently associate with continuation in an abusive relationship and with major depressive disorder. These findings suggest that individuals who lack social support, are undergoing high levels of stress, or have impaired cognitive abilities due to mental disorder might practice self-blame because it is a coping mechanism that requires little investment of resources (citation). Perceived control is described by researchers as a resource for stress resilience, and so it can be described as a resource under the COR model.

=== Self-blame as meaning making ===
Meaning-making models describe coping as strategies that extract some knowledge or fortitude from the occurrence of a negative event. This typically occurs in reactions to negative or stressful events that have already happened (harm/loss appraisals). Meaning-making stems from the intuition that individuals want to understand the world. To do this, they form beliefs about how the world works, which constitute global meanings. When individuals learn from specific events, they derive situational meanings from the event's circumstances. Conflict between existing global meanings and situational meanings cause stress, since a violation has occurred in the person's understanding of the world. For example, crime victimization may cause conflict between a global meaning ("I am generally safe in my everyday life") and a situational meaning ("I was targeted by a criminal"). Greater conflict between global and situational meaning predicts worse adaptation to negative events, and this aligns with some researchers predictions regarding what happens when victims regard themselves as invulnerable. Dealing with meaning discrepancy is known as meaning-making and is analogous to coping. Adaptive meaning-making creates causal understanding, a feeling that the situation has been made sense of, or a sense of acceptance. Meaning-making theorists are distinct from other theories on self-blame by their emphasis on beliefs of the individual before stress occurs. Meaning-making also aligns with individuals' subjective reports of dealing with the significance of important events.

Self-blame is a process to explain the situational meaning of an event by assigning causal responsibility. This attribution might accomplish coping by reducing the discrepancy between the preexisting global meaning and the situational meaning. Park and colleagues (2008) define a process of assimilation by which new situations are incorporated into global meaning. For self-blame, for example, a global meaning that the world is orderly could be threatened by an unexpected event. Self-blame is a way to assimilate the new situation; by blaming characteristics or behaviors of the self, the individual can continue to believe that the world operates in a sensible way. Alternately, the individual might blame him- or herself in order not perceive others as threatening or aggressive; self-blame has been shown to correlate with benign attributions made by victims of catcalling, for example.

== Applications ==
Given the mixed evidence of any positive benefits of BSB and the negative effects of CSB, it is difficult to propose that treatments encourage self-blame as an effective coping strategy. Cognitive-behavioral therapy (CBT) aims to change maladaptive patterns of thought and behavior. This therapy may involve suggestions to the patient to change his or her appraisals of stressors. Positive reappraisal, or trying to reevaluate situations to focus on helpful or fulfilling aspects, seems to be an especially effective coping strategy that is endorsed by CBT. Positive reappraisal may include self-blame in some respects if individuals think about ways in which their choices had beneficial consequences and attribute that to their behavior, or if individuals use their choices as indications of their emotions and values. CBT might also encourage individuals to feel control over their emotions and behavioral reactions to situations, and behavioral self-blame might be a conduit for increasing perceived control. In this way, it is possible that effective therapeutic strategies would involve self-blame. However, encouraging self-blame per se does not appear likely to improve outcomes.

== Conclusions ==
Theories from social psychology, positive psychology, and clinical psychology seem to agree on the important role of perceived control in the effects of self-blame, though empirical support for this relation has been mixed. Social psychology theories of stress and coping note that self-blame is a type of coping process because it involves cognitive activities that affect the relation of an individual to their goals. Self-blame might aptly be called an emotion-focused coping strategy because it deals with the emotional consequences of a stressor without attempting to remove the stressor. However, behavioral self-blame may correlate with or motivate problem-focused coping by giving the individual a sense that negative events are avoidable in the future. The types of attributions individuals make during self-blame are important for coping. Stable, uncontrollable attributions, or CSB, have been proposed to be globally maladaptive, while unstable, controllable attributions, BSB, tend to be more controversial. However, empirical evidence has varied on both types, and this suggests an effect of other variables, such as the type of stressor, or methodological problems with instruments measuring self-blame.

Self-blame seems to interact with the type of stressor to determine whether it can be helpful. Research shows that BSB can motivate adaptive recovery behaviors in a situation of accidental injury. On the other hand, research into crime victimization has found frequent negative effects of both BSB and CSB. The difference between these scenarios may be in the differences in problem-focused coping strategies available. For injury, there are apparent ways for individuals to cope: exerting effort on rehabilitation, or positively reappraising the accident by what the individual still has. On the other hand, serious crime victimization does not offer a clear path forward to avoid future victimization that does not involve fear or social withdrawal. Situations also differ in their tendency to elicit attributions of blame. In crime victimization, attributions of blame are very common, while bereaved parents have reported lower frequency of searching to attribute blame. Behavioral self-blame may come from a false belief in control, and this could lead individuals to try their hand at unsolvable problems, like staying in an abusive relationship.

One problem in stress research is the developing better instruments to measure stress. Of particular relevance to self-blame is the importance to use measures that distinguish between CSB and BSB, which differ in their prevalence, attributions they make on controllability of the future, and their associated outcomes. Many studies examining effects of self-blame on reaction to misfortune and trauma do not distinguish between types of self-blame.; as such, they may struggle to understand whether individuals are putting blame on their choices or actions (behavioral factors), or on uncontrollable aspects of the self (characterological factors). This parallels a problem of conflating ways of coping that are maladaptive with those that are adaptive, or conflating coping behaviors with outcomes that come after coping

In any case, while BSB has not been found empirically-effective enough to recommend by itself, it seems to be less harmful than CSB. Empirical studies, when they distinguish between CSB and BSB, often show differences between their effects. One intriguing area of study is if BSB can be used as an alternative to CSB. In line with Dweck's studies on encouraging effort, not ability, attributions, it seems that it might be possible to propose attributing outcomes to choices, not stable, unchoosable characteristics. Following this line, attribution theorists suggest that events are attributed to one factor or another, not both. While this might not be useful in treatment of mental disorders like depression, where both types of self-blame are already present, it may be endorsable as a preventive measure against stressful events to "switch" blame from characterological factors to behavioral factors. However, it may not be easy to blame behaviors without making some characterological judgments as well. Future research may examine whether or not BSB can be used as a substitute for CSB.
