= Lateral violence =

Violence within a marginalised community

Lateral violence or horizontal hostility is a hypothesized form of intra-group conflict where members of a group perceived as oppressed displace their aggression towards their own community rather than towards the perceived oppressors of the community. Work environments with strong vertical hierarchies and where horizontal hostility is common are associated with poor outcomes for patients and clients. Horizontal hostility is argued to benefit oppressing groups and is also proposed to impede movements that promote social justice.

Targets of horizontal hostility may be members of the group who are perceived to be more mainstream or relatable to the oppressive cultural groups.

Horizontal hostility has been studied in relation to Indigenous communities, institutional settings (especially nursing), and social movements such as feminism.

== Social movements ==
Horizontal hostility within feminist movements has been studied since the 1970s.

Brazilian educator and philosopher Paulo Freire discussed horizontal violence in his book Pedagogy of the Oppressed (1970). Freire claimed members of oppressed groups act as "sub-oppressors" when they direct their hostility and frustration toward their peers instead of the oppressing group. Freire theorized “sub-oppressors" act from feelings of low self-esteem, powerlessness, and fear of reprisal, lashing out at members of their own group because that feels safer and allows them to feel more powerful.

== Indigenous communities ==
Lateral violence within Indigenous communities is claimed to part of a cycle of abuse and its roots lie in factors including colonization, oppression, intergenerational trauma and the ongoing experiences of racism and discrimination. These traumas are argued to contribute to self-oppressing or bullying behaviors within the community. Those experiencing and those committing lateral violence are claimed to be more likely to be involved in crime in the United States, and the United Kingdom.

In Australia and Canada, lateral violence is seen by one source as an intergenerational learned pattern and major social problem in Indigenous communities. In Australia surveys have reported that up to 95% of Aboriginal youth had witnessed lateral violence in the home, and that 95% of the bullying experienced by Aboriginal people was perpetrated by other Aboriginal people.

A 2008 study by the Canadian Ministry of Health claimed trauma resulting from the Canadian boarding school systems has led to substance and alcohol abuse. This, along with severing ties to indigenous culture are argued as factors which predispose indigenous communities towards domestic abuse and violence.

== Institutional settings ==
Horizontal hostility has been studied in the field of nursing since at least the early 1980s. In this field, it is defined as workers "overtly or covertly directing their dissatisfaction inward toward: (a) those less powerful than themselves, (b) themselves, and (c) each other". Lateral hostility among nurses is an issue throughout practice settings. The most cited theory attempting to explain the problem of lateral hostility in nursing suggests that nurses experience oppression or powerlessness in the workplace, that this creates a toxic work environment, and nurses express their frustration through horizontal hostility. Worker burnout and poor outcomes for patients and clients may result from work environments atmospheres where horizontal hostility is common.

Horizontal hostility is a significant concept in discourse about Diversity, Equity, and Inclusion (DEI), where it is perceived as a barrier to the goals of DEI programs.

== See also ==
- Cycle of poverty
- Displaced aggression
- Divide and rule
- Precarity
- The enemy of my enemy is my friend
- The Hunger Games
- Tragedy of the commons
