= Respectful workplace =

A respectful workplace is a safe place of employment where employees are valued, recognised, treated fairly, have clear expectations, and work harmoniously.

== Benefits ==
Benefits of a respectful workplace include better morale, teamwork, lower absenteeism, lower turnover of staff, reduced worker's compensation claims, better ability to handle change and recover from problems, work seems less onerous, and improved productivity. Positively viewed teams will retain and employ better staff.

Lack of respect and what is sometimes called "incivility"—low level negative behaviours (such as rudeness, discourteousness, not acknowledging others)—can create a dysfunctional team environment, relationship breakdown, decline in productivity, and the risk of psychological injury.

=== Health and social impact ===
Respectful workplaces that foster positive work climates can improve an employee's well-being such as with lower heart-rates, lower blood pressure, and a stronger immune system.

== Process ==
Managers that want to encourage a respectful workplace must model the appropriate example. They should talk about what behaviours are encouraged. The managers must be willing to talk about problem behaviours. There should be safe ways to report problems, which could be anonymous, or independent people such as an ombudsman. Measures of the culture could include competitiveness, formality, respect, hospitality and supportiveness.

Respect can be included in performance appraisals, with feedback given in a formal process. Disrespectful behaviour must not be ignored but be named and its impact brought to the attention of the responsible person. By ignoring problematic behaviour, others will perceive it as condoned.

The "compassionate organisation" will have strategies that deal with problems affecting the well being of employees such as redundancies, disasters, workplace conflict. There would be strategies that enable recovery from distress.
