= Displaced aggression =

Anger directed at something other than the stimuli

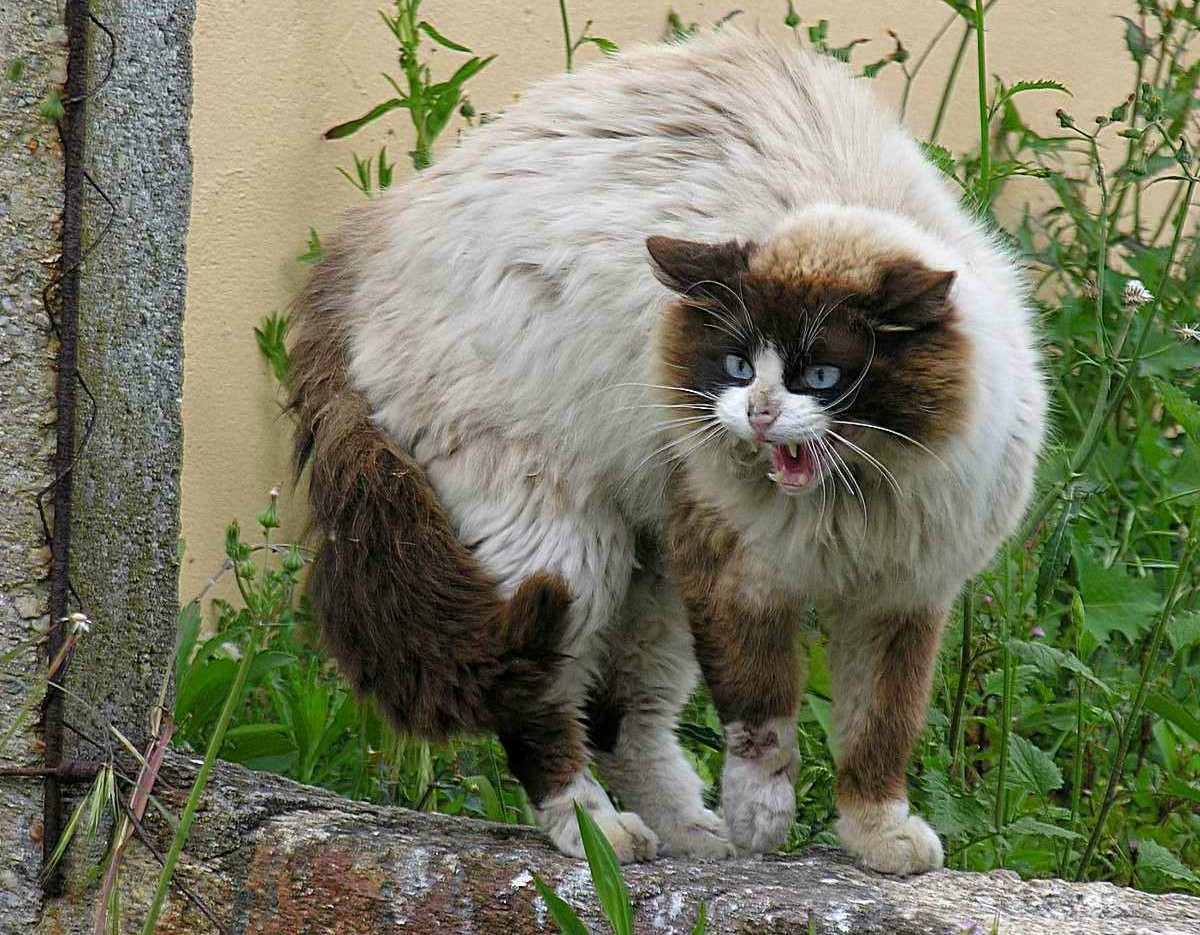
If a cat is annoyed by a stimulus and cannot attack it, it may direct anger elsewhere by attacking or directing aggression to the nearest cat, dog, human or other being.

Displaced aggression, also referred to as redirected aggression, occurs when an animal is fearful or agitated by external stimuli, a provocation, or perception, but is unable or unwilling to direct their aggression toward the stimulus. The aggressor may direct aggression toward whoever is nearest. The behavior is more common in cats than it is in dogs. In certain species of monkeys anger is redirected toward a relative or friend of an opponent. In cichlid fish, it may be used to manage conflict within the group.

This behavior is also found among humans. Displaced aggression can also be known as triggered displaced aggression which is defined by a person being triggered, or provoked, by another to cause a display of negative emotion. These outbursts of negative emotion are a result of not being able to control emotions and letting one's anger build over time. What makes triggered displaced aggression different is that there is the provocation, which is what causes one to be angry, and the provocation which leads to the reaction; the aggressive reaction often goes beyond the magnitude of these two components combined.

== By species ==
=== Cats ===
Redirected aggression is a common form of aggression which can occur in multiple cat households. Usually there is some stimulus that agitates: this could be a sight, sound, or another source of stimuli which causes a heightened level of anxiety or arousal. If the cat cannot attack the stimulus, it may direct anger elsewhere by attacking or directing aggression to the nearest cat, dog, human or other being. Redirected aggression is more common in cats than in dogs.

=== Dogs ===
Aggressive behavior in dogs is often rooted in fear. It is thought that a dog may go into a state of self-protection when it feels threatened. Some dogs may also become overstimulated or feel frustrated when they cannot get to the stimuli, which causes anxiety or fear. The dog may divert their anger toward their owner in what is referred to as a redirected bite.

In some cases, dogs may be frustrated by being unable to go after prey, and they turn on the owner in what is redirected aggression. One woman, Bethany Lynn Stephens, was killed by her own two dogs, which were both Pit Bull; the incident has been referred to as a possible case of dogs redirecting aggression.

=== Elephants ===
Some solitary adolescent male elephants (10 to 15 years old) were observed bashing vegetation or charging other non-threatening animals in what is thought to be a form of redirected aggression.

=== Monkeys ===
The behavior has also been observed in monkeys of the rhesus macaques (Macaca mulatta) and vervet and yellow baboon (Papio cynocephalus) species. In the case of the rhesus macaques, and vervets, the redirected anger is not toward a random monkey, it is toward a relative of the monkey's opponent. In yellow baboons (known to form long-term friendships) the redirected anger was toward the rival baboon's friends.

=== Cichlid fish ===
The behavior has been observed in cichlid fish Julidochromis regani, which is considered a social fish living in groups. Observing the fish, researchers noted that after an attack the target fish redirected aggression toward a third party fish, diverting the aggressor's attention toward the third party. This behavior was observed in the females of the species. The researchers also noted that the redirected aggression did not delay aggression from the original aggressor. Their conclusion was that redirected aggression is used to manage conflict in social fish.

=== Humans ===
Displaced aggression occurs among humans. It may also take the form of scapegoating. Much like redirected aggression in animals a target of aggression or provocation directs their anger at a third party. Usually this is because it is either not possible or perhaps unwise to return or direct aggression to the original source of provocation. In example, a victim attacks an uninvolved third party who had little to do with the victimization. Often the target of redirected aggression is a weaker or smaller person.

Displaced aggression can take the form of domestic violence. In the United States, ten million people per year—one in three women and one in ten men 18 years of age or older—experience domestic violence. Domestic abusers have been found to display this aggression when they are stressed or provoked and rumination plays a vital role in higher levels of aggression. Rumination is the repetitive dwelling on negative emotions and what caused their negative feelings.

This type of thinking is also involved in mood disorders like depression and anxiety. Those that have depression often experience rumination by repeatedly thinking and dwelling on their depressive symptoms and the causes of their symptoms leading to a lack of control of their mental states. This can also be seen in individuals who experience anxiety as rumination is often one of the many symptoms of this disorder. Because there is relationship between these disorders and rumination, individuals who suffer from them will often have bouts of displaced aggression as a result of them not having full control over their thoughts and emotions.

Road rage is another example of displaced aggression; the American Psychological Association states that factors such as crowded roads can boost anger behind the wheel causing displaced anger. According to Displaced Aggression Theory by criminal lawyer Kenneth Padowitz, traffic on the roads can cause people to take their aggression out on uninvolved drivers. Year over year there is a seven percent increase in reported cases of road rage in the United States. Frustrated or impatient drivers often operate recklessly by speeding and cutting off others.

Ingesting alcohol can also cause displays of displaced aggression as it lowers inhibitions and increases aggressive behavior. If one is intoxicated, it has been shown that a notable trigger, like an insult, will lead to a higher degree of aggression than those who are sober and have full control of themselves. However, under heavy intoxication the level of aggression and display of displaced aggression will fade as inhibitions are so low it is hard for one to notice such a trigger. Displays of displaced aggression also come from a sense of incompetency and threats to our beliefs about our self-efficacy. Humans tend to think of themselves as self-sufficient and establish goals they strive towards, and when there are obstacles in the way of these goals, their sense of self-efficacy is often harmed. A depleted sense of self-efficacy and frustration in reaching goals motivates displaced aggression as there is often not a way to take out this aggression on what is blocking one from reaching their set goal.

In the case of human groups or communities the aggression may be directed at a local minority population. This behavior has been observed in redirected aggression toward immigrants in the form of xenophobia, and is another example of scapegoating.

== Strategies ==
The agitated animal must be avoided until it is no longer angry. The animal's access to whatever the stimulus was should be restricted.

One strategy humans can deploy to mediate displays of displaced aggression is mindfulness. Although it seems simple, a sense of mindfulness is associated with lower levels of hostility and aggression, both verbal and physical. Having a sense of mindfulness, put simply, is being aware of your emotions and how you are displaying them. A part of this is being able to recognize when the aggression begins to take control and having ways to manage this aggression. This can include calling a loved one, meditating, and writing down what caused this anger. Humans should avoid getting involved by interfering in fights or using physical punishment as a corrective tool. The person may be considered the threat in those scenarios.

== See also ==
- Acting out
- Disparate impact
- Displacement (psychology)
- Externalizing disorder
- Going postal
- Hate-watching
- Kick the cat
- Kiss up kick down
- Lateral violence
- Overcrowding
- Scapegoat
- Social stress
