= Culture of fear =

Arrangement in which fear of retribution is pervasive

Culture of fear (or climate of fear) is the concept which describes the pervasive feeling of fear in a given group, often due to actions taken by leaders. The term was popularized by Frank Furedi in the late 1990s and American sociologist Barry Glassner in the mid-2000s.

== In politics ==
Nazi German politician Hermann Göring explained how people can be made fearful and to support a war they would otherwise oppose:

The people don't want war, but they can always be brought to the bidding of the leaders. This is easy. All you have to do is tell them they are being attacked, and denounce the pacifists for lack of patriotism and for exposing the country to danger. It works the same in every country.

In her book State and Opposition in Military Brazil, Maria Helena Moreira Alves found a "culture of fear" was implemented as part of political repression since 1964. She used the term to describe methods implemented by the national security apparatus of Brazil in its effort to equate political participation with risk of arrest and torture. Cassação (English: cassation) is one such mechanism used to punish members of the military by legally declaring them dead. This enhanced the potential for political control through intensifying the culture of fear as a deterrent to opposition.

Alves found the changes of the National Security Law of 1969, as beginning the use of "economic exploitation, physical repression, political control, and strict censorship" to establish a "culture of fear" in Brazil. The three psychological components of the culture of fear included silence through censorship, sense of isolation, and a "generalized belief that all channels of opposition were closed." A "feeling of complete hopelessness" prevailed, in addition to "withdrawal from opposition activity."

Former U.S. National Security Advisor Zbigniew Brzezinski argues that the U.S. government's use of the term "war on terror" was deliberately intended to generate a culture of fear because it "obscures reason, intensifies emotions and makes it easier for demagogic politicians to mobilize the public on behalf of the policies they want to pursue".

Frank Furedi, a former professor of Sociology and writer for Spiked magazine, says that the present-day culture of fear did not begin with the September 11 attacks. Before, he argues, public panics were widespread on everything from genetically modified food and mobile phones, to global warming and foot-and-mouth disease. Like Durodié, Furedi argues that perceptions of risk, ideas about safety and controversies over health, the environment and technology have little to do with science or empirical evidence. Rather, they are shaped by cultural assumptions about human vulnerability. Furedi says that "we need a grown-up discussion about our post-September 11 world, based on a reasoned evaluation of all the available evidence rather than on irrational fears for the future."

British academics Gabe Mythen and Sandra Walklate argue that following the September 11 attacks, 2004 Madrid train bombings, and 2005 London bombings, government agencies developed a discourse of "new terrorism" in a cultural climate of fear and uncertainty. British researchers argued that these processes reduced notions of public safety and created the simplistic image of a non-white "terroristic other" that has negative consequences for ethnic minority groups in the UK.

In his 2004 BBC documentary film series The Power of Nightmares, subtitled The Rise of the Politics of Fear, the journalist Adam Curtis argues that politicians use fears to increase their power and control over society. Though he does not use the term "culture of fear," what Curtis describes in his film is a reflection of this concept. He looks at the American neo-conservative movement and its depiction of the threat first from the Soviet Union and then from radical Islamists. Curtis insists there has been a largely illusory fear of terrorism in the West since the September 11 attacks and that politicians such as George W. Bush and Tony Blair had stumbled on a new force to restore their power and authority; using the fear of an organised "web of evil" from which they could protect their people. Curtis's film castigated the media, security forces, and the Bush administration for expanding their power in this way. The film features Bill Durodié, then Director of the International Centre for Security Analysis, and Senior Research Fellow in the International Policy Institute, King's College London, saying that to call this network an "invention" would be too strong a term, instead asserting that it probably does not exist and is largely a "(projection) of our own worst fears, and that what we see is a fantasy that's been created."

== In the workplace ==
Ashforth discussed potentially destructive sides of leadership and identified what he referred to as petty tyrants: leaders who exercise a tyrannical style of management, resulting in a climate of fear in the workplace. Partial or intermittent negative reinforcement can create an effective climate of fear and doubt. When employees get the sense that bullies are tolerated, a climate of fear may be the result. Several studies have confirmed a relationship between bullying, on one hand, and an autocratic leadership and an authoritarian way of settling conflicts or dealing with disagreements, on the other. An authoritarian style of leadership may create a climate of fear, with little or no room for dialogue and with complaining being considered futile.

In a study of public-sector union members, approximately one in five workers reported having considered leaving the workplace as a result of witnessing bullying taking place. Rayner explained the figures by pointing to the presence of a climate of fear in which employees considered reporting to be unsafe, where bullies had been tolerated previously despite management knowing of the presence of bullying. Individual differences in sensitivity to reward, punishment and motivation have been studied under the premises of reinforcement sensitivity theory and have also been applied to workplace performance. A culture of fear at the workplace runs contrary to the "key principles" established by W. Edwards Deming for managers to transform business effectiveness. One of his fourteen principles is to drive out fear in order to allow everyone to work effectively for the company.

== Impact of the media ==
The consumption of mass media has had a profound effect on instilling the fear of terrorism in the United States, though acts of terror are a rare phenomenon. Beginning in the 1960s, George Gerbner and his colleagues have accelerated the study of the relationship that exists between media consumption and the fear of crime. According to Gerbner, television and other forms of mass media create a worldview that is reflective of "recurrent media messages", rather than one that is based on reality. Many Americans are exposed to some form of media on a daily basis, with television and social media platforms being the most used methods to receive both local and international news, and as such this is how most receive news and details that center around violent crime and acts of terror. With the rise in use of smartphones and social media, people are bombarded with constant news updates, and able to read stories related to terrorism, stories that come from all corners of the globe. Media fuels fear of terrorism and other threats to national security, all of which have negative psychological effects on the population, such as depression, anxiety, and insomnia. Politicians conduct interviews, televised or otherwise, and utilize their social media platforms immediately after violent crimes and terrorist acts, to further cement the fear of terrorism into the minds of their constituents.

== See also ==
- Abusive supervision
- Cringe culture
- Fear appeal
- Fear mongering
- Horror and terror
- Moral panic
- Police state
- State terrorism
- Toxic workplace
- Yellow journalism
