= Managing up and managing down =

Management terminology

Managing Up and Managing Down is a part of management that details how middle managers or supervisors should effectively deal with their managers and subordinates. Promotion to management comes with additional responsibility of managing down. With the additional responsibility for managing their team while remaining accountable to their management teams, managers require additional skills and training to effectively influence up or down. Management levels within large organizations are structured from a hierarchal organization and include senior, middle, and lower management roles.

== Outcomes ==
Effectively managing up and down can lead to the following accomplishments:

- Promotions
- Job opportunities
- Special recognition
- Improved working conditions
- Improved company culture
- Special project opportunities
- Improved internal relationships

== Required skills ==
Certain skills must be employed to manage up and down successfully. These include:

- Organization skills - Having strong organizational skills allows for proper coordination of staff and resources within the company.
- Communication skills - The ability to express wants and needs related to work allocation sets a clear and coordinated roadmap and reduces the likelihood of misinterpretations.
- Time Management
- Motivation - Effective managers often use different types of motivation to influence subordinates and tailor assignments to suit them.
- Leadership skills - These skills offer the ability to understand and communicate the company’s needs and inspire others to work diligently toward goals
- Behavioral acknowledgements - Recognizing the behavior and perceptions of others enables managers to resolve conflicts, manage stress, improve themselves as well as others, and increase efficiency.
- Authentic Leadership - Describes the ability to behave genuinely, regardless of hierarchical position or influence over subordinates.
- Cross-cultural leadership - Pertains to the ability to understand the effects of culture on leadership style.
- Setting clear expectations - By setting clear expectations, and vocalizing exactly what actions are required, the risk of misunderstandings and missed deadlines can be mitigated.
- Consistent feedback -Soliciting and providing feedback ensures the performance rebalancing or acknowledgment of a job well done.
- Accepting limitations -The ability to accept limitations and work off or around them is an important skill that is beneficial to problem solving.

== Managing up ==
=== Managing up ===
Turk suggests several different guidelines for managing up, including being loyal and committed; understanding the boss’s perspective, agenda, and preferences; providing solutions instead of problems; and understanding one's own management style. Each of the different guidelines Turk provides serves an important benefit for both sides.

The Careers Group recommends “[understanding] where your work fits in with your manager’s goals and the wider goals of the organization”, which is applicable when managers have their own projects to work on in addition to managing subordinates. Considering the challenges that managers face with their projects and working to either assist or stay out of the way when those projects require more attention is recommended. Putting oneself in the position to be recognized as someone who can handle the work they were assigned and assist the manager in their work can be particularly beneficial when advocating for one's own projects. Figuring out where the work one wants to accomplish fits into the overall goals for the company is crucial to getting approval on those projects as well.

According to Badowski, good managing up requires going above and beyond the tasks assigned to enhance the manager's work. Making the manager's job easier will not only help them do their job, but they will consider one to be a valuable asset to them and the organization.

The instructions specify performing the assigned task.

=== Communication ===
Understand how the manager likes to communicate. Price suggests appealing to the managers' communication styles: “If he or she likes to communicate face-to-face rather than through email updates, then set up short meetings.” Communicating with the manager in a way that they are receptive to feels as though time spent is well utilized and they will associate one with productivity.

=== Influencing up ===
Bradford introduces the idea of "influencing up" where it may be possible for a subordinate without authority to influence those with authority.

== Managing down ==
=== Tendencies that negatively affect employees ===
- Always giving and never receiving feedback. Receiving, analyzing, and applying feedback from a managers perspective is just as important as giving it. Neglecting to give employees the opportunity to evaluate one's performance does not allow them to feel like their voice matters to the person directly overseeing their work.
- Micromanaging employees. Constantly checking the progress of employees can be uncomfortable and prove to be unproductive for both sides.
- Being inflexible. Neglecting to acknowledge circumstances affecting employees outside of work when making decisions can frustrate people and create a hostile work environment.
- Not taking responsibility for the team as a whole. When managing a group the failures and successes can be attributed to the team's leader/manager, forfeiting the responsibility when the team fails is not good leadership.
- Lack of personal motivation. People pick up on the habits of the people managing them. A negative attitude towards one's work can spread to subordinates and create a lack of motivation in the company.

=== Tendencies that positively affect employees ===
- Providing challenging work to stimulate employees. When employees are stimulated by their work they have more of an incentive to actively try to complete it versus mundane tasks that do not have any benefits.
- Supporting employees’ decisions. Encouraging and supporting the decisions that employees make can motivate employees who have low self-esteem and do not find motivation in the same things as their peers.
- Coaching and developing employees’ skills. Taking the time to coach and develop the skills of the people one works around benefits both sides: one gets to learn these skills and the other has the opportunity to master these skills.
- Encouraging good relationships. Encouraging employees to be vocal with each other about concerns and compliments promotes a culture where frustrations do not build up and cause delays in work.
- Recognizing conflict and dealing with its causes. Recognizing the roots of employees' frustrations and working to fix them before they become a company-wide issue alleviates workplace tension and can establish a good morale with employees.

=== Skills required for managing down ===
It is claimed that good managing down requires the following attributes:

- Organization skills. Having strong organizational skills allows for proper coordination of staff and resources within the company.
- Communication skills. The ability to express wants and needs to employees in a clear and coordinated manner eliminates any misinterpretations.
- Motivation. Managers who understand that different people require types of motivation and cater their assignments toward them prove to be particularly effective.
- Leadership skills. The skills that managers and leaders require heavily overlap and the main focus in both sets is creating mutual trust and respect between one and one's subordinates.
- Utilizing the right management style. Recognizing what one's management style is allows one to utilize it in a way that matches employees’ motivation styles.
- Being authentic. Most adults can recognize a genuine person, and being a trustworthy person who is reliable earns respect.
- Safe environments. Promoting a workplace culture that encourages everyone to feel comfortable with themselves and the work that they do reaps benefits for everyone.
- Setting clear expectations. Along with communication skills comes clear expectations, vocalizing exactly what needs to be done and when leaves little room for misunderstandings and excuses for things not to be done.
- Consistent feedback. Constantly reporting back to employees on their performance allows one to work with them on problem areas before they become a habit and to analyze and applaud a job well done. Receiving feedback reaps the same benefits for managers as well.
- Accepting imperfection. The ability to accept limitations and work off of or around them is an important skill that is beneficial in learning how to problem solve in a bind.
