= Rudeness =

Display of disrespect

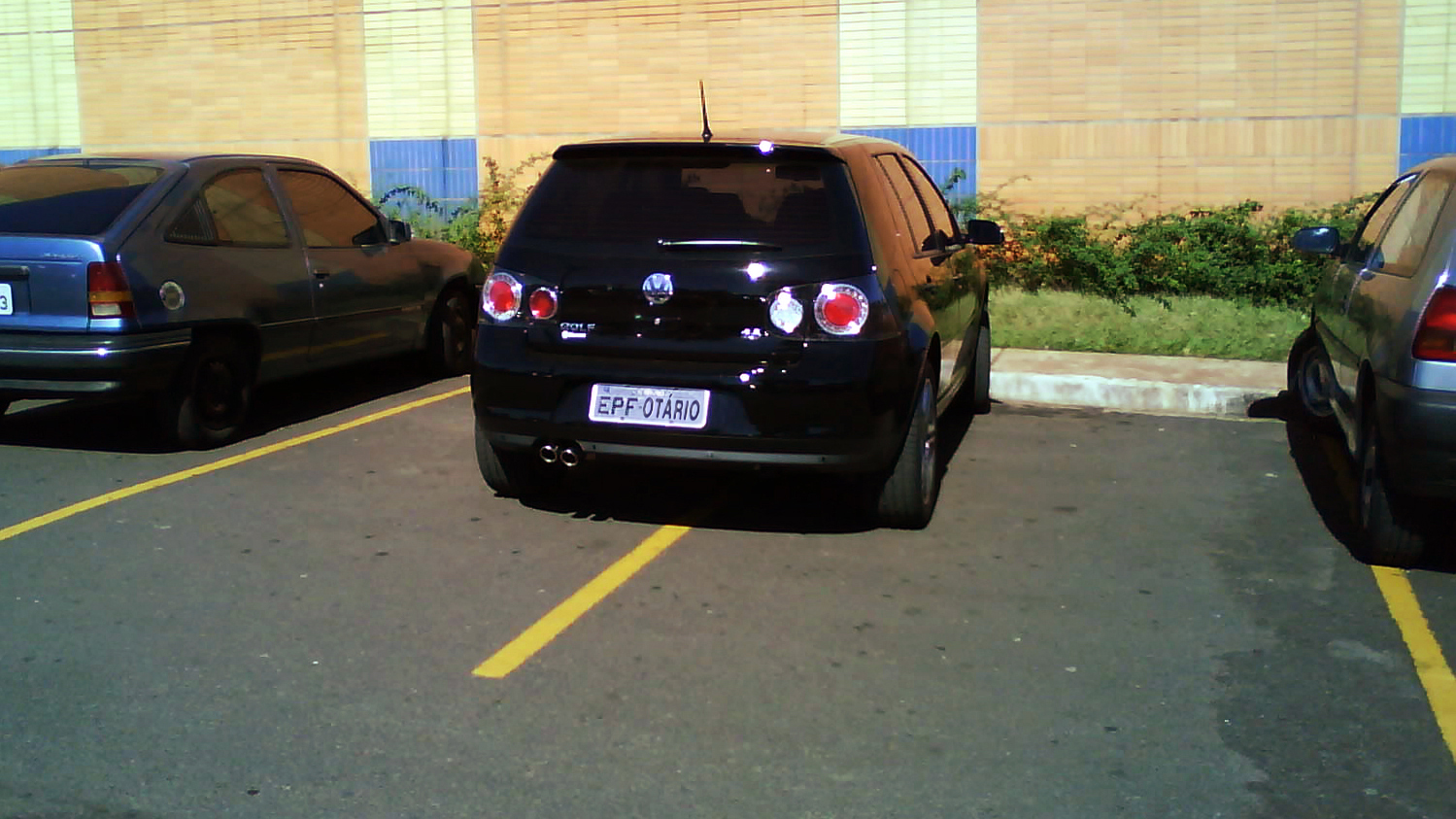
It is considered rude to take up more than one parking space in a parking lot, which inconveniences other motorists.

Rudeness (also called effrontery) is a display of actual or perceived disrespect by not complying with the social norms or etiquette expected within a relationship, social group, or culture. Social norms are established as the essential guidelines of normally accepted behavior within a given context, and individuals often establish personal boundaries to meet their own needs and desires within smaller settings, such as friendships. To be unwilling to align one's behavior with these norms known to the general population of what is socially acceptable is to be rude. These norms may resemble a sort of "unspoken law", with social repercussions or rewards for violators or advocates, respectively.

Rudeness, "constituted by deviation from whatever counts as politic in a given social context, is inherently confrontational and disruptive to social equilibrium". Forms of rudeness include behaving in ways that are inconsiderate, insensitive, deliberately offensive, impolite, obscene, or that violate taboos. In some cases, an act of rudeness can go so far as to be a crime (e.g., the crime of hate speech). In many cultures, joking can create a context where rudeness is temporarily excused or indulged for the purpose of making people laugh.

The concept of rudeness is somewhat subjective (i.e., different people may have different views) and contextual (i.e., it depends on the setting). Some actions, such as wearing shoes indoors, using vulgar language, wearing headphones, or addressing elders by their first name, may be deemed rude in one setting and perfectly acceptable or even expected in others.

== Relationship to morality ==
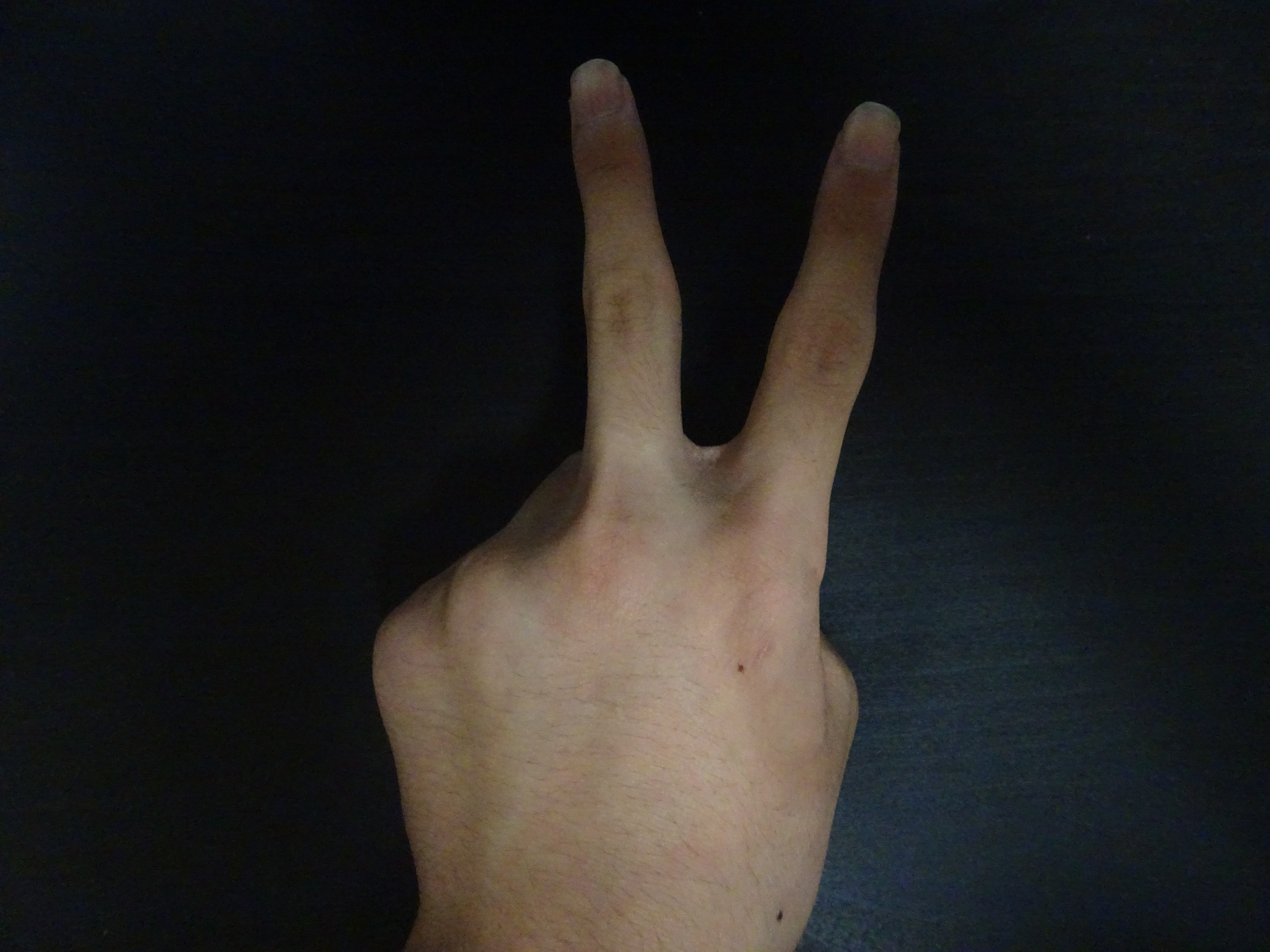
A "V sign" with the fingers can mean "peace" in some situations and "up yours" in others.

Both manners and morality deal with whether a thing is morally good or bad, but at different levels. Unlike morality, which, for example, condemns murder as a violation of a person, manners primarily concerns itself with violations of human dignity, rather than the person's health or property. Rude behaviour is a violation of human dignity or of the respect due to others.

The moral basis for opposing rudeness is that people ought to give some consideration to other people's feelings, and thus avoid causing them needless or undue distress.

== Cultural differences ==
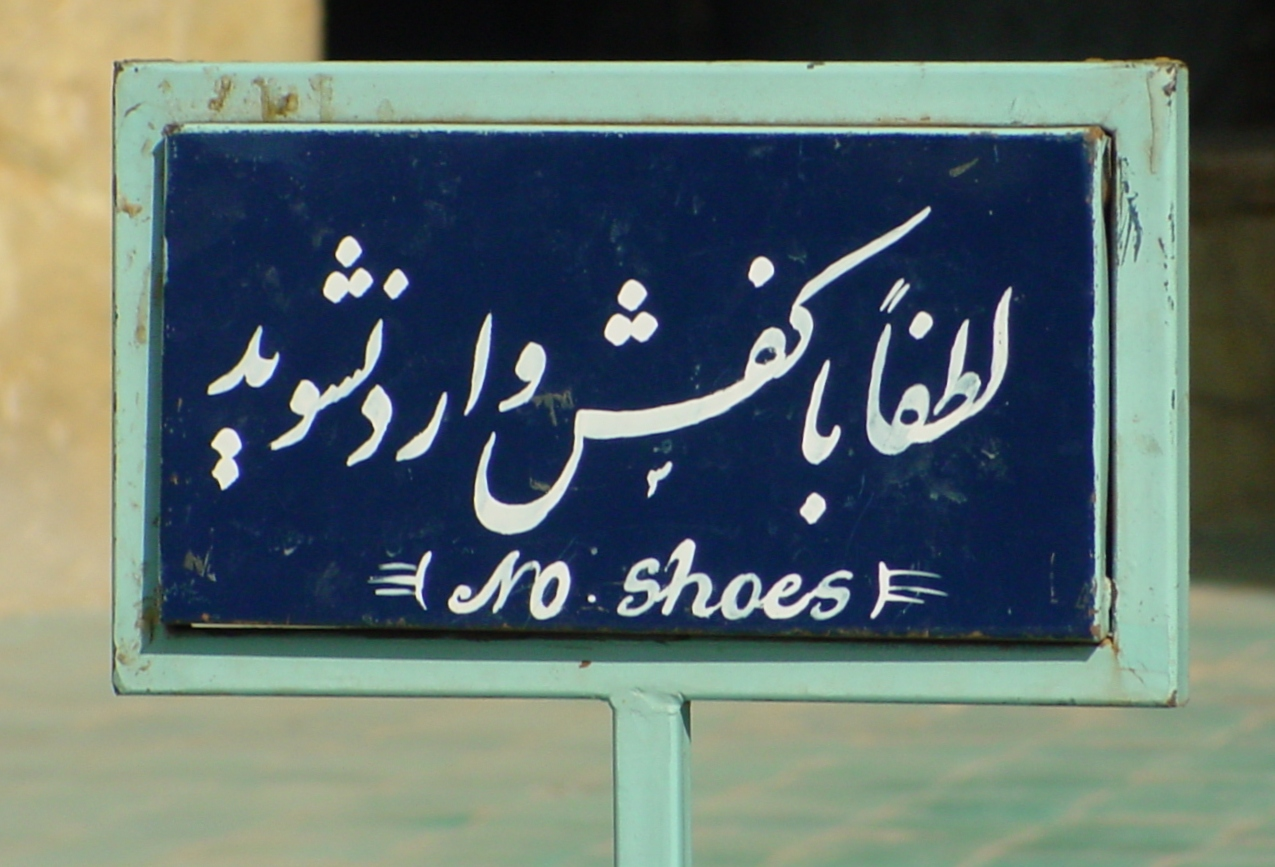
In some places, removing shoes before going indoors is a sign of respect.

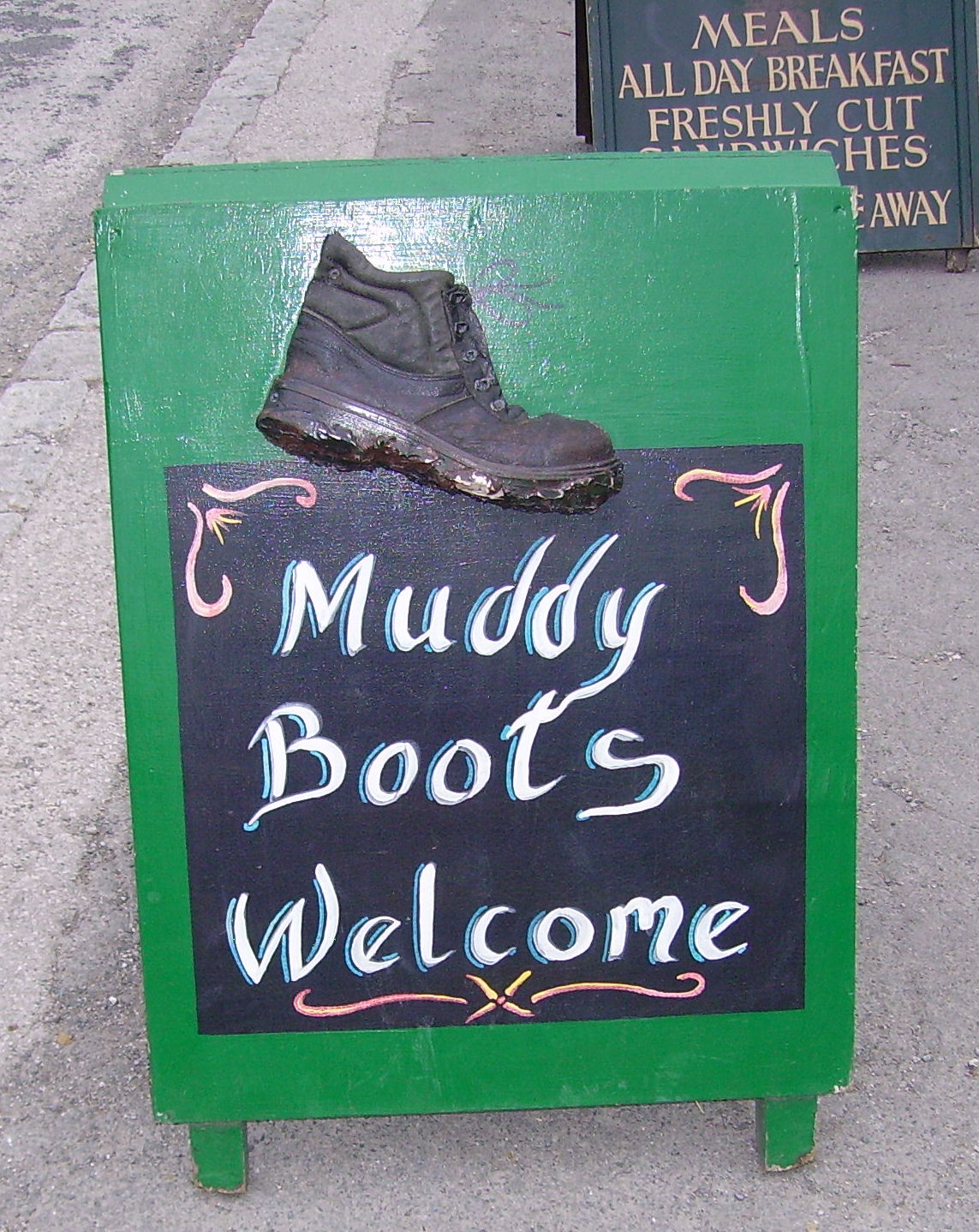
In other places, shoes may be worn.

The specific actions that are considered polite or rude vary dramatically by place, time, and context. Differences in social role, gender, social class, religion, and cultural identity may all affect the appropriateness of a given behaviour. Consequently, a behaviour that is considered perfectly acceptable by one group of people may be considered clearly rude by another.

For example, in medieval and Renaissance Europe, it was rude to indicate that a man wearing a mask in public could be recognized. Instead, polite behaviour demanded that the masked person be treated as a completely unknown person and that no one ever attribute the masked person's actions to the individual who performed them. By contrast, in the modern era, greeting a friend by name while he is wearing a mask, or talking to them later about their costume or activities, is not generally regarded as rude.

Cultural differences also appear over time. In the mid-20th century, the meaning of eye rolling changed from its older signal of lust and passion to expressing contempt.

== Utility ==
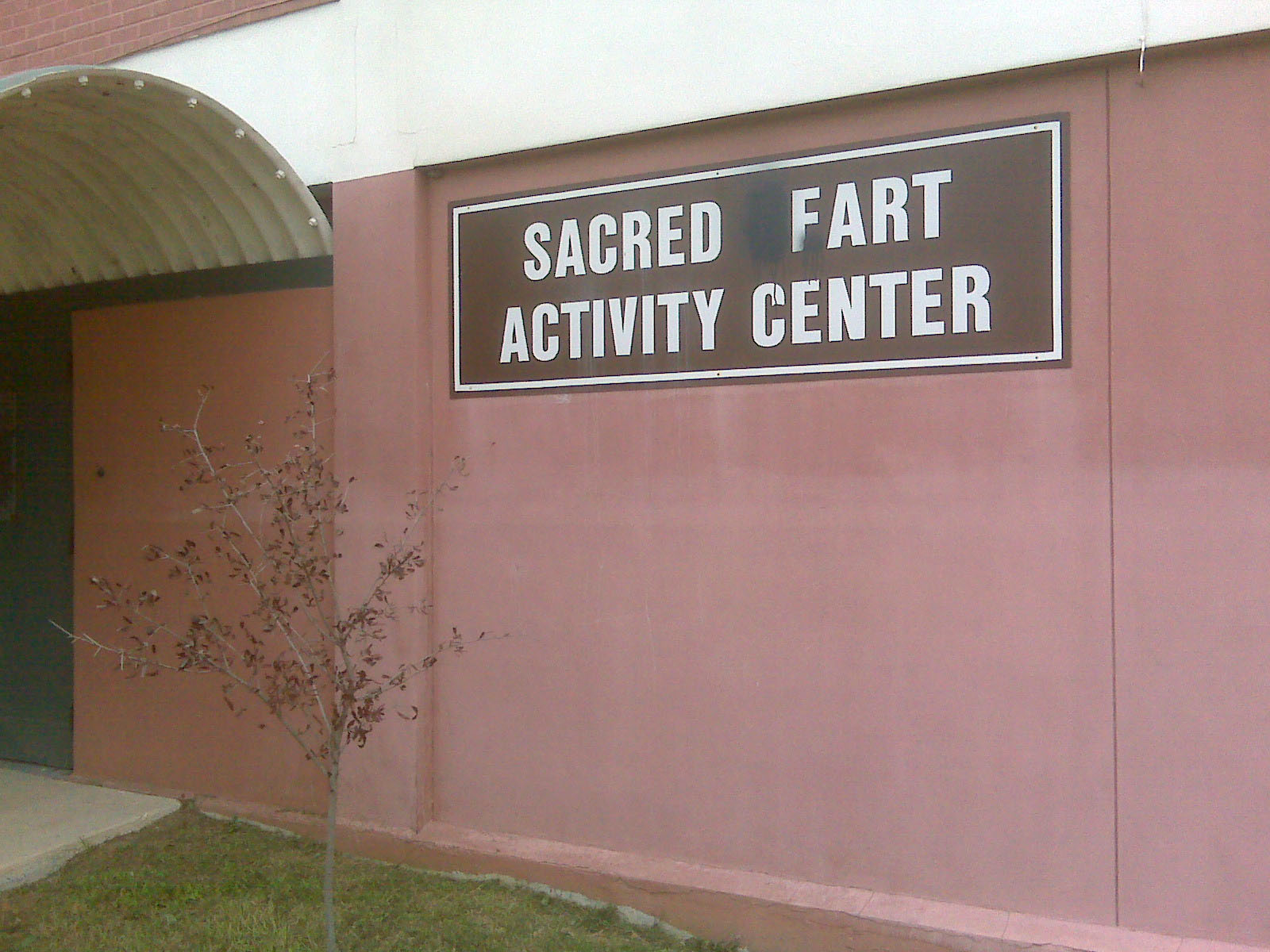
An example of graffiti where a sign has been edited to spell the word "fart". Graffiti and farting are widely considered to be rude, but this rudeness is often seen as having comic potential.

Sometimes, people deliberately employ rude behaviours to achieve a goal. Early works in linguistic pragmatism interpreted rudeness as a defective mode of communication. However, most rudeness serves functional or instrumental purposes in communication, and skillfully choosing when and how to be rude may indicate a person's pragmatic competence.

Robin Lakoff addressed what she named strategic rudeness, a style of communication used by prosecutors and therapists (attack therapy) to force their interlocutors (a courtroom defendant or patient) to talk or react in a certain way. Rudeness in everyday speech "is frequently instrumental, and is not merely pragmatic failure". Most rude speakers are attempting to accomplish one of two important instrumental functions: to vent negative feelings, or to get power.

Additionally, sometimes a rude behavior is chosen to communicate disapproval or disrespect. While it is generally rude to refuse to greet someone, refusing to shake hands with a traitor may be justifiable.

== Examples ==
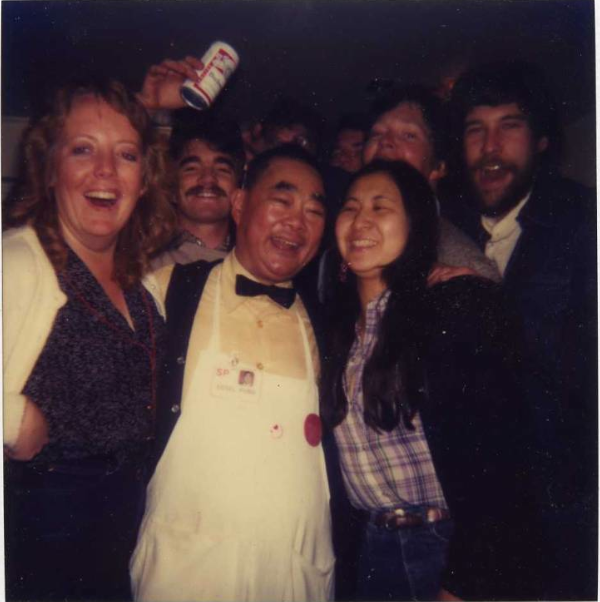
Edsel Ford Fong, credited with being the world's rudest waiter

In every culture, it is possible to act rudely, although what constitutes rude behaviour varies. The following are examples of behaviour that many Western societies would consider rude or a breach of etiquette, though views may vary by culture, setting, or individual circumstances:

=== Speech ===
What constitutes rude speech depends on the culture, the setting, and the speaker's social position in the culture. In every culture, some words or statements are considered hate speech or inappropriate ethnic slurs. In most modern cultures, insulting a person or group of people, especially for any reason outside their immediate control, such as having a medical condition, being a particular gender, or being poor, is considered rude. Rude speech also includes derogatory terms describing an individual person and asking inappropriate questions or pressing for answers to a question.

However, there is no universal rule about which terms are considered derogatory and which questions are inappropriate under what circumstances. A question or comment that is acceptable between family members might be resented from strangers, just like a question that is acceptable among young people in one culture might be unacceptable to older people or to young people in a different culture.

Rude ways of speaking include inappropriately discouraging a person's participation in a conversation with rude phrases, such as shut up or using a tone of voice that indicates disrespect for the other person. An impolite tone may amplify obviously rude remarks or contradict nominally polite words. A rude person may interrupt a speaker to indicate that the first speaker is unimportant.

Failing to speak can also be rude: a rude person might pointedly ignore a legitimate and polite greeting or question to communicate disregard for the other person, or might fail to express appropriate thanks for favors or gifts by way of communicating either a sense of selfish entitlement or a disregard for the efforts of the giver. Sometimes people will leave very short gaps when speaking that may allow another person to begin speaking on a subject, however that can vary, and sometimes two or more people speaking at the same time can be considered rude. Which acts and communications require a response from which persons, under which circumstances, and what kind of response is required, depends on the culture and the social situation of the people concerned.

One last form of using rudeness is as a rite of passage. For example, some black communities in the United States use The Dozens as a mechanism to promote verbal abuse resilience and maturity among young people.

=== Behaviours ===
Many behaviours can be rude. These often depend upon the context, including time, place, and culture.

This includes a failure to dress appropriately for an occasion, whether by dressing too informally, too formally, immodestly, or otherwise inappropriately (e.g., a young woman in public without a veil in Iran; a young woman in public with a veil in France). C. S. Lewis writes that "A girl in the Pacific islands wearing hardly any clothes and a Victorian lady completely covered in clothes might both be equally 'modest,' proper, or decent, according to the standards of their own societies"—but that in each culture, the idea of immodest, improper, and indecent dress existed, and that violating the culture's standard was rude.

Rude behaviours often disturb other people, such as making noise or playing loud music. An acceptable level of sound depends on the context: yelling might be the only way to be heard at a noisy construction site, and rock concerts are expected to feature loud music, but a conversation at a normal level, either by telephone or in person, might be rude in an environment where a reasonable degree of silence is expected, such as in libraries, churches and moviehouses and complete silence is expected at other times, such as during religious ceremonies or performances of classical music. This includes speaking over a presentation or film with no consideration for the other viewers. Similarly, poor table manners can disturb or disgust nearby people, as can yawning, coughing, farting or sneezing without covering the mouth.

Other rude behaviours have the effect of communicating disrespect for other people. In extreme cases, this can escalate to the complete and deliberate social exclusion of the disrespected person; in others, the rudeness is only temporary and may be unintentional. For example, it can be rude to use electronic devices, such as mobile phones, if this results in ignoring someone or otherwise indicating that the present company is less interesting or important than the people elsewhere or the text messages they send. Similarly, cutting in line signals that the person cutting in the line believes themselves to be more important than the people their action delays. Barging into someone else's space without permission, whether that be a violation of personal space or crashing a party, is rude because it does not respect the person's property rights or right to make personal choices.

Other examples include:

- Bullying or intimidating people with the threat of violence
- Lying to people
- Snobbery
- Aggressive driving

== See also ==
- Dysphemism
- Emily Post
- Incivility
- Innuendo
- Loaded language
- Miss Manners
- Workplace incivility
- Worldwide etiquette
- Eye-rolling

== Bibliography ==
- Beebe, L. M. (1995). "Polite fictions: Instrumental rudeness as pragmatic competence". In Alatis, J. E.; Straehle, C. A.; Gallenberger, B.; Ronkin, M. (eds.). Georgetown University round table on language teachers: Ethnolinguistic, psycholinguistic, and sociolinguistic aspects. Washington, DC: Georgetown University Press. pp. 154–168.
- Brown, P.; Levinson, S. (1987). Politeness: Some universals in language use. Cambridge University Press. ISBN 978-0-521-31355-1.
- Grice, H. P. (1975). "Logic and conversation". In Cole, P.; Morgan, J. (eds.). Syntax and semantics: Speech acts. Vol. 3. New York: Academic Press. pp. 41–53.
- Kasper, Gabriele (April 1990). "Linguistic politeness: Current research issues". Journal of Pragmatics. 14: 193–218. doi:10.1016/0378-2166(90)90080-W. ISSN 0378-2166.
- Labov, W. (1972). Language in the inner city: Studies in the Black English vernacular. Philadelphia: University of Pennsylvania Press. ISBN 978-0-8122-1051-4.
- Lakoff, Robin (1989). "The limits of politeness: Therapeutic and courtroom discourse". Multilingua. 8 (2/3): 101–129. doi:10.1515/mult.1989.8.2-3.101. ISSN 0167-8507. S2CID 144630209.
- Lewis, C. S. (2001). Mere Christianity: a revised and amplified edition, with a new introduction, of the three books, Broadcast talks, Christian behaviour, and Beyond personality. [San Francisco]: HarperSanFrancisco. ISBN 0-06-065292-6.
- Martin, Judith (1996). Miss Manners rescues civilization: from sexual harassment, frivolous lawsuits, dissing, and other lapses in civility. New York: Crown Publishers. ISBN 0-517-70164-2.
- Moumni, H. (2005). Politeness in Parliamentary Discourse: A Comparative Pragmatic Study of British and Moroccan MPs' Speech Acts at Question Time (Unpub. Ph.D. Thesis). Rabat, Morocco: Mohammed V University.
- Palleschi, Marino (5 December 2005). "The Commedia dell'Arte: Its Origins, Development & Influence on the Ballet" (in Italian).
- Tannen, D. (1984). Conversational style: Analyzing talk among friends. Norwood, NJ: Ablex Publishing. ISBN 0-19-522181-8.
- Tannen, D. (1990). You just don't understand: Men and women in conversation. New York: Ballantine. ISBN 978-0-06-095962-3.
- Thomas, Jenny A. (1983). "Cross-cultural pragmatic failure". Applied Linguistics. 4 (2): 91–112. doi:10.1093/applin/4.2.91. hdl:11059/14627. ISSN 0142-6001.
- Westacott, E (2006). "The Rights and Wrongs of Rudeness". International Journal of Applied Philosophy. 20 (1): 1–22. doi:10.5840/ijap20062013.
- Wickman, Forrest (15 January 2013). "Oh, Please: When did we start rolling our eyes to express contempt?". Slate.
