= Blame =

Censuring of a person or group

Blame is the act of censuring, holding responsible, or making negative statements about an individual or group that their actions or inaction are socially or morally irresponsible, the opposite of praise. When someone is morally responsible for doing something wrong, their action is blameworthy. By contrast, when someone is morally responsible for doing something right, it may be said that their action is praiseworthy. There are other senses of praise and blame that are not ethically relevant. One may praise someone's good dress sense, and blame their own sense of style for their own dress sense.

== Philosophy ==
Philosophers discuss the concept of blame as one of the reactive attitudes, a term coined by P. F. Strawson, which includes attitudes like blame, praise, gratitude, resentment, and forgiveness. In contrast to physical or intellectual concepts, reactive attitudes are formed from the point of view of an active participant regarding objects. This is to be distinguished from the objective standpoint.

== Neurology ==
Blaming appears to relate to include brain activity in the temporoparietal junction (TPJ). The amygdala has been found to contribute when we blame others, but not when we respond to their positive actions.

== Sociology and psychology ==
Humans—consciously and unconsciously—constantly make judgments about other people. The psychological criteria for judging others may be partly ingrained, negative, and rigid, indicating some degree of grandiosity.

Blaming provides a way of devaluing others, with the result that the blamer feels superior, seeing others as less worthwhile and/or making the blamer "perfect". Off-loading blame means putting the other person down by emphasizing their flaws.

Victims of manipulation and abuse frequently feel responsible for causing negative feelings in the manipulator/abuser towards them and the resultant anxiety in themselves. This self-blame often becomes a major feature of victim status.

The victim gets trapped into a self-image of victimization. The psychological profile of victimization includes a pervasive sense of helplessness, passivity, loss of control, pessimism, negative thinking, strong feelings of guilt, shame, remorse, self-blame, and depression. This way of thinking can lead to hopelessness and despair.

=== Self-blame ===
Two main types of self-blame exist:

1. behavioral self-blame – undeserved blame based on actions. Victims who experience behavioral self-blame feel that they should have done something differently, and therefore feel at fault.
2. characterological self-blame – undeserved blame based on character. Victims who experience characterological self-blame feel there is something inherently wrong with them which has caused them to deserve to be victimized.

Behavioral self-blame is associated with feelings of guilt within the victim. While the belief that one had control during the abuse (past control) is associated with greater psychological distress, the belief that one has more control during the recovery process (present control) is associated with less distress, less withdrawal, and more cognitive reprocessing.

Counseling responses found helpful in reducing self-blame include:

- supportive responses
- psychoeducational responses (for example, learning about rape trauma syndrome)
- responses addressing the issue of blame.

A helpful type of therapy for self-blame is cognitive restructuring or cognitive–behavioral therapy. Cognitive reprocessing is the process of taking the facts and forming a logical conclusion from them that is less influenced by shame or guilt.

=== Victim blaming ===
Victim blaming is holding the victims of a crime, an accident, or any type of abusive maltreatment to be entirely or partially responsible for the incident that has occurred. The fundamental attribution error concept explains how people tend to blame negative behavior more on the victims traits than the situation at the time of the event.

=== Individual blame versus system blame ===
In sociology, individual blame is the tendency of a group or society to hold the individual responsible for their situation, whereas system blame is the tendency to focus on social factors that contribute to one's fate.

=== Blame shifting ===
Blaming others can lead to a "kick the dog" effect where individuals in a hierarchy blame their immediate subordinate, and this propagates down a hierarchy until the lowest rung (the "dog"). A 2009 experimental study has shown that blaming can be contagious even for uninvolved onlookers.

In complex international organizations, such as enforcers of national and supranational policies and regulations, the blame is usually attributed to the last echelon, the implementing actors.

=== As a propaganda technique ===
Labeling theory accounts for blame by postulating that when intentional actors act out to continuously blame an individual for nonexistent psychological traits and for nonexistent variables, those actors aim to induce irrational guilt at an unconscious level. Blame in this case becomes a propaganda tactic, using repetitive blaming behaviors, innuendos, and hyperbole in order to assign negative status to normative humans. When innocent people are blamed fraudulently for nonexistent psychological states and nonexistent behaviors, and there is no qualifying deviance for the blaming behaviors, the intention is to create a negative valuation of innocent humans to induce fear, by using fear mongering. For centuries, governments have used blaming, for example in the form of demonization, to influence public perceptions of various other governments and themselves, as well as to induce feelings of nationalism in the public. Blame can objectify people, groups, and nations, typically negatively influencing the intended subjects of propaganda, compromising their objectivity. Blame is utilized as a social-control technique. However, while this strategy can be successful in swaying public perceptions, recent research also highlights the risk that scapegoating strategies may backfire on the governments that use them, especially when citizens perceive them as lacking credibility and as attempts to avoid accountability.

=== In organizations ===
The flow of blame in an organization may be a primary indicator of that organization's robustness and integrity. Blame flowing downwards, from management to staff, or laterally between professionals or partner organizations, indicates organizational failure. In a blame culture, problem-solving is replaced by blame-avoidance. Blame coming from the top generates "fear, malaise, errors, accidents, and passive-aggressive responses from the bottom", with those at the bottom feeling powerless and lacking emotional safety. Employees have expressed that organizational blame culture made them fear prosecution for errors and/or accidents and thus unemployment, which may make them more reluctant to report accidents, since trust is crucial to encourage accident reporting. This makes it less likely that weak and/or long-term indicators of safety threats get picked up, thus preventing the organization from taking adequate measures to prevent minor problems from escalating into uncontrollable situations. Several issues identified in organizations with a blame culture contradict the best practices adopted by high reliability organizations. Organisational chaos, such as confused roles and responsibilities, is strongly associated with blame culture and workplace bullying. Blame culture promotes a risk aversive approach, which prevent organizations and their agents from adequately assessing risks.

According to Mary Douglas, blame is systematically used in the micro-politics of institutions, with three latent functions: explaining disasters, justifying allegiances, and stabilizing existing institutional regimes. Within a politically stable regime, blame tends to be asserted on the weak or unlucky one, but in a less stable regime, blame shifting may involve a battle between rival factions. Douglas was interested in how blame stabilizes existing power structures within institutions or social groups. She devised a two-dimensional typology of institutions, the first attribute being named "group", which is the strength of boundaries and social cohesion, the second "grid", the degree and strength of the hierarchy. According to Douglas, blame will fall on different entities depending on the institutional type. For markets, blame is used in power struggles between potential leaders. In bureaucracies, blame tends to flow downwards and is attributed to a failure to follow rules. In a clan, blame is asserted on outsiders or involves allegations of treachery, to suppress dissidence and strengthen the group's ties. In the 4th type, isolation, the individuals are facing the competitive pressures of the marketplace alone; in other words, there is a condition of fragmentation with a loss of social cohesion, potentially leading to feelings of powerlessness and fatalism, and this type was renamed by various other authors into "donkey jobs". It is suggested that the progressive changes in managerial practices in healthcare is leading to an increase in donkey jobs.

The requirement of accountability and transparency, assumed to be key for good governance, worsen the behaviors of blame avoidance, both at the individual and institutional levels, as is observed in various domains such as politics and healthcare. Indeed, institutions tend to be risk-averse and blame-averse, and where the management of societal risks (the threats to society) and institutional risks (threats to the organizations managing the societal risks) are not aligned, there may be organizational pressures to prioritize the management of institutional risks at the expense of societal risks. Furthermore, "blame-avoidance behaviour at the expense of delivering core business is a well-documented organizational rationality". The willingness of maintaining one's reputation may be a key factor explaining the relationship between accountability and blame avoidance. This may produce a "risk colonization", where institutional risks are transferred to societal risks, as a strategy of risk management. Some researchers argue that there is "no risk-free lunch" and "no blame-free risk", an analogy to the "no free lunch" adage.

== See also ==
- Attribution (psychology)
- Attribution bias
- Causality
- Culpability
- Denial
- Fall guy
- Fundamental attribution error
- Moral responsibility
- Praise
- Presumption of guilt
- Psychological projection
- "Result(s)-oriented work environment" or "result(s)-only work environment" (ROWE)
- Scapegoating
