= Kick the cat =

Metaphor about frustration within an organization

Kick the cat, also sometimes kick the dog, is a metaphor used to describe how a relatively high-ranking person in an organization or family displaces their frustrations by abusing a lower-ranking person, who may in turn take it out on their own subordinate.

== Origin of the idiom ==
The term has been used in the United States at least since the 19th century.

In current usage, the name envisions a scenario where an angry or frustrated employee comes home from work looking for some way to take out their anger, but the only thing present is the cat. The employee physically abuses the cat as a means of relieving frustration, despite the cat playing no part in causing it.

== Workplace or family dynamics ==
Kicking the cat is commonly used to describe the behaviour of staff abusing coworkers or subordinates as a mechanism to relieve stress. This behaviour can result in a chain reaction, where a higher-ranking member of the company abuses their subordinate, who takes it out on their own subordinate, and so on down the line. This domino effect can also be seen in family dynamics, where the father yells at the mother who yells at the older child who yells at the younger child who yells at the pet.

Blaming others can lead to kicking the dog where individuals in a hierarchy blame their immediate subordinate, and this propagates down a hierarchy until the lowest rung (the "dog"). A 2009 experimental study has shown that blaming can be contagious even for uninvolved onlookers.

== Psychological theories ==
Kicking the cat is looked upon unfavourably and viewed as a sign of poor anger management. Author Steve Sonderman has claimed that "[m]en funnel 90 percent of their emotions through anger," saying that they may "kick the cat" as a substitute for grief, anxiety or other emotions. Psychology author Raj Persaud suggests that people "kick the cat" as a means of catharsis because they fear expressing their full emotions to peers and colleagues.

== See also ==
- Displaced aggression
- Abusive supervision
- Bullying culture
- Hostile attribution bias
- Kiss up kick down
- Presumption of guilt
- Psychological projection
- Scapegoating
