= Passive-aggressive behavior =

Indirect resistance to the demands of others

Passive-aggressive behavior is a communication that in the mind of the speaker is based on a strong negative emotion such as anger but is expressed using words that do not convey the emotion, including completely avoiding direct communication when it is socially customary. Such behavior can be effective to avoid confrontation, rejection, and criticism but can be confusing, annoying, and exasperating to a recipient of the communication due to the discordance between what they hear and what they perceive.

Passive-aggressive behavior was first defined clinically by Colonel William C. Menninger during World War II in the context of soldiers' reactions to military compliance. Menninger described soldiers who were not openly defiant but expressed their civil disobedience (what he called "aggressiveness") by "passive measures, such as pouting, stubbornness, procrastination, inefficiency, and passive obstructionism" due to what Menninger saw as an "immaturity" and a reaction to routine military stress.

An outdated definition rejected by the American Psychiatric Association is as follows: Passive-aggressive behavior is characterized by a habitual pattern of non-active resistance to expected work requirements, opposition, sullenness, stubbornness, and negative attitudes in response to requirements for normal performance levels expected by others. Most frequently it occurs in the workplace, where resistance is exhibited by indirect behaviors such as procrastination, forgetfulness, and purposeful inefficiency, especially in reaction to demands by authority figures, but it can also occur in interpersonal contexts.

In conflict theory, passive-aggressive behavior can resemble behavior better described as catty, as it consists of deliberate, active, but carefully veiled hostile acts which are distinctively different in character from the non-assertive style of passive resistance.

Passive-aggressive behavior in the workplace can lead to conflict and damage team unity and productivity. If ignored, it could result in decreased efficiency and frustration among workers. If managers are passive-aggressive, it can end up stifling team creativity. One researcher states that it would "make perfect sense that those promoted to leadership positions might often be those who on the surface appear to be agreeable, diplomatic and supportive, yet who are actually dishonest, backstabbing saboteurs behind the scenes."

== See also ==
- Gossip
- Guilt trip
- Sarcasm
- Silent treatment

== Bibliography ==
- Kantor, Martin (2002), Passive-aggression: a guide for the therapist, the patient and the victim, Westport, CT: Praeger Publishers, ISBN 978-0-275-97422-0.
- Wetzler, Scott (1992), Living with the Passive–aggressive Man, Simon & Schuster, ISBN 978-1-4516-4017-5.
- Oberlin, Loriann Hoff (2005), Overcoming Passive-Aggression: How to Stop Hidden Anger From Spoiling Your Relationships, Career and Happiness, Perseus, p. 45, archived from the original on 4 January 2014
- Femenia, Nora (2012). The Silent Marriage: How Passive Aggression Steals Your Happiness. ASIN B0090XFBF2.
- Nicholas James Long; Jody E. Long; Signe Whitson (2008). The Angry Smile: The Psychology of Passive–aggressive Behavior in Families, Schools, and Workplaces. Pro ed. ISBN 978-1-4164-0423-1.
