= 2006 Goleta postal facility shooting =

Mass shooting in California, U.S.

- Location of Goleta in California
- Location: 34.4252°N 119.8660°W; Santa Barbara and Goleta, California, U.S.
- Date: January 30, 2006; 20 years ago c. 7:15 – c. 9:00 p.m. (PST; UTC−08:00)
- Target: Goleta postal facility
- Attack type: Mass shooting; mass murder; spree shooting; murder–suicide; workplace shooting
- Weapon: 9mm S&W Model 915 semi-automatic pistol
- Deaths: 8 (7 at the mail sorting facility, including the perpetrator, and 1 in Santa Barbara)
- Perpetrator: Jennifer San Marco
- Motive: Unknown

On January 30, 2006, a mass shooting took place at a United States Postal Service facility in Goleta, California. Six people were killed before the perpetrator, former employee Jennifer San Marco, committed suicide. Prior to the Goleta shooting, San Marco shot and killed her former neighbor in Santa Barbara. It is the deadliest mass murder in Santa Barbara County’s history.

== Shootings ==
On the morning of January 30, 2006, Jennifer San Marco arrived in Los Angeles after boarding a flight from New Mexico. She made a two-hour drive to Santa Barbara, where San Marco gained entry into her former residence at an apartment complex and broke into the condominium of Beverly Graham, a former neighbor who frequently argued with San Marco over loud noise. After scaling a fence and entering Graham's condominium through an unlocked sliding glass door, San Marco killed Graham with two gunshots to the head. Neighbors placed the killing between 7:15 p.m. and 8:15 p.m.

Via U.S. Route 101, San Marco traveled five miles to the Goleta Processing and Distribution Center. San Marco entered the sprawling plant's lot by tailgating another car as it passed through the gate. She took an employee's identification badge at gunpoint in order to gain electronic access to the building through the secure staff entrance. She then told the employee to leave; the worker was physically unharmed.

At 9:00 p.m., in the building's parking lot, San Marco shot and killed Maleka Pineda and Ze Fairchild. Both were killed with single gunshots to the head. Outside the facility entrance, she killed Nicola Grant with two gunshots to the head and chest. The gunshots were likely not heard due to most employees wearing ear protection and further muted by the interior sound of heavy machinery. Around eighty employees were inside the facility at the time of the shooting.

San Marco entered the building and shot supervisor Charlotte Colton in the head, who was then dragged into a room by a co-worker. Colton would die two days later in Santa Barbara Cottage Hospital. In the annex, San Marco approached two employees and aimed her gun at them at point-blank range, but did not fire. She then headed to her former work station and encountered Guadalupe Swartz, who saw her coming and tried to flee. San Marco, however, rapidly fired four shots into Swartz, killing her. Dexter Shannon, a Vietnam War veteran with grandchildren, heard nothing of the gunshots as he was working with headphones on; he was fatally shot at point-blank range. San Marco then killed herself by shooting herself in the head. The shooting lasted less than two minutes.

Over one hundred officers of the Santa Barbara County Sheriff's Department, California Highway Patrol and Santa Barbara Police Department evacuated the remaining employees from the building, holding most at a nearby fire station while a SWAT unit searched the building.

== Victims ==
The six postal workers killed in Goleta

Initially, it was reported that there were three dead and one wounded. Two victims were recovered alive, but one died the same day while the other died two days later at a hospital. Including the shooting in Santa Barbara, six women and one man were killed. With the exception of Graham, who was white, all six of the dead in Goleta had a minority background: Grant, Pineda, and Shannon were Black, Swartz was Hispanic, Colton was Filipino, and Fairchild was Hmong Laotian. Of them, three were residents of Santa Barbara, two were from Lompoc, and one was from Oxnard. The six workers were employed for the US Postal Service for between 36 and 10 years.

=== Santa Barbara ===
- Beverly Ann Graham, 54

=== Goleta ===
- Charlotte Colton, 44,
- Ze Vang Fairchild, 37
- Nicola Grant, 42
- Maleka Brinley-Higgins Pineda, 28
- Dexter Shannon, 57
- Guadalupe Swartz, 52

== Perpetrator ==
Jennifer San Marco

Immediately after the shooting, police stated the perpetrator was a female ex-employee of the postal facility, but did not release any other information. The day after the shooting, police publicly identified the perpetrator as 44-year-old Jennifer San Marco, a resident of Grants, New Mexico, though initially misspelling the last name as "Sanmarco". San Marco was employed at the postal facility between 1997 and 2003. San Marco was recognised on site by other employees, albeit with a noticeably shorter "crew-cut" hairstyle. She had purchased the murder weapon, a second-hand Smith & Wesson Model 915 at a pawn shop in Grants in August 2005, buying 15 rounds of ammunition separately at another pawn shop in Gallup.

=== Personal background ===
San Marco was born on December 6, 1961 in Brooklyn, New York. She went to Edward R. Murrow High School and later attended Brooklyn College and Rutgers University for two years, studying natural resources management at the latter, but without graduating.

Between 1990 and 1993, San Marco was employed as a correctional officer at California Rehabilitation Center in Norco. She quit her job and worked as a hotel clerk in Eatontown, New Jersey between April and October 1994 before returning to California, taking a job as a residential counselor at a group home in Santa Barbara. San Marco again became a correctional officer and worked at Chuckawalla Valley State Prison in Blythe, resigning after two years citing a "change of career goals" In 1994, San Marco was hired by the Santa Barbara Police Department as a dispatcher, for which she underwent a background check and psychological evaluation. She left the job after several months. San Marco became employed for the US Postal Service as a part-time night shift clerk in August 1997, buying a condominium in Santa Barbara the same year. Between 1998 and 2000, she also worked as a food service assistant for the Santa Barbara Unified School District.

=== Mental health and work dismissal ===
According to co-workers, San Marco's behavior became "increasingly more bizarre" and she was prone to making racist remarks and acting hostile towards Asian people, though she never issued any direct threats. Since her employment at the postal facility, she had kept records on her co-workers, detailing perceived slights and offenses, specifically mentioning Ze Fairchild and Dexter Shannon, writing that the former was "making [her] very uncomfortable". On February 5, 2001, San Marco was removed from the postal facility by police after her supervisor reported that she voiced suicidal thoughts while displaying "erratic and aberrant behavior" and placed on a 72 hour involuntary mental health hold at Vista Del Mar Hospital in Ventura. On March 12, the US Postal Service ordered San Marco to undergo a psychological evaluation and placed her on unpaid leave for 21 days.

Throughout 2002, San Marco wrote several letters to government officials, including Assistant Director in Charge of the Federal Bureau of Investigation's Los Angeles Field Office Ronald L. Iden and California Attorney General Bill Lockyer, accusing the US Postal Service, various municipal and law enforcement agencies, and the federal government of harassment and discrimination against her. Among other complaints, she alleged that her workplace at the postal facility subjected her to a "hierarchical racist/sexist form of discriminatory mandate" and that the postal service was stalking and verbally assaulting her outside of work, in coordination with the city of Santa Barbara, claiming its "German and/or Dutch" culture was targeting her as an Italian-American. In June 2003, San Marco was escorted out of the postal facility by police in handcuffs due to concerns of potential self-harm after an incident in which San Marco ended up under a mail-sorting machine. San Marco was initially returned to work after some months, but again forcibly removed by security due to complaints over her erratic behavior and racist comments. She was placed on medical leave and given early retirement on grounds of mental disability.

In 2004, San Marco attempted to drive across the United States in order to move in with relatives on the East Coast, but her car broke down in Milan, New Mexico, settling down in nearby Grants. San Marco earned a reputation for strange behavior, such as talking to an imaginary friend or ordering food at restaurants only to run out before eating. San Marco was known to frequently harass members of the local municipal office after she was denied a license to start a cat food business. She most often targeted one employee, Sonya Salazar, coming into the office only to stare at Salazar, to the point where other employees told her to hide upon San Marco's arrival. San Marco would usually leave abruptly, talking to herself and gesticulating before entering her car and driving back and forth in front of the office. In one instance, San Marco once accused Salazar of sleeping with someone; authorities were called and she ceased her visits. She also came into contact with authorities in Grants after she appeared naked at a gas station. She was clothed when the officers arrived and they ultimately let her off with a warning.

In November 2005, mental health clinic manager Darlene Hayes reported seeing San Marco alone in a post office parking lot, kneeling at her car and talking to herself, telling Hayes she was praying with her brother and sister. According to Hayes, she called police to request an immediate mental health checkup for San Marco, but the department responsible stated that they did not have a call by Hayes on record. San Marco was never arrested or treated for mental health issues during her residence in New Mexico.

==== The Racist Press ====
In July 2004, San Marco applied for a business license to begin publishing a periodical known as The Racist Press. She had already composed five volumes and according to San Marco, "the purpose of The Racist Press is to offer information to you on how and why government sanctioned murders have occurred in America, in their colleges and in their offices, and still continue to this day". Analysts described the writings as "bizarre, persecutory, and paranoid beliefs about government murder conspiracies, [which] linked the government to the Ku Klux Klan, and merged memories of her early childhood (e.g., Rocky Horror Picture Show) with paranoid beliefs about the United States", also containing a recollection of alleged encounters with serial killer David Berkowitz and president Richard Nixon, whom she accused of colluding with the KKK. Other allegations included that she was "physically assaulted by police, mentally tortured and mandated to comply over a period of 2 years" and that "the Rocky Horror Picture Show can be unraveled as a white supremacist movement intentionally written for government murder". San Marco claimed to have gained knowledge of the KKK conspiracy while working for the federal government at the postal facility while simultaneously using racist language to refer to Black people and Jews. With reference to her workplace, San Marco also claimed that various ethnicities, including "Eastern Indian, Philippine Islander, Thailand, Mexican and Korean" were really "'klan' neo-nazi Germans". The publishing license was ultimately turned down.

In November 2005, San Marco contacted the Los Angeles Times for a classified ad, offering to send the publication via mail for $4, including a draft for the advertisement reading "Been a member of a Cult? Did that fad go out in the '70s-'80s? Any unexplained suicides? Please read The Racist Press", but no plans were made for publication since she did not follow a request to provide an example copy of the paper. One issue of The Racist Press, which lacked the eponymous racial themes and instead "expounded on the dangers of mental telepathy", was published and later obtained by the Santa Barbara News-Press.

== Investigation ==
On February 3, 2006, San Marco's home was searched. Three boxes with "items of interest" were recovered. Relevant material included writings indicating that San Marco believed herself to be the target of a conspiracy centered at the Goleta postal facility and a cancelled check with the word "will" written on the envelope. A spokesman for the Santa Barbara County Sheriff's Office conjectured that San Marco's paranoia and history of mental illness may have motivated her to commit the murders. Racism was also a possible influence in the shooting, as all six of the victims killed at the postal facilities were minorities. She may have also murdered Graham for personal reasons, as the two had previously quarreled. According to Graham's boyfriend, San Marco would often go outside and start singing loudly. Graham also complained to her brother that San Marco would come out and "rant and rave" in front of her building.

According to San Marco's brother, he had warned police of his sister, stating that she was "fixated" on her former workplace in Goleta, which she described as "evil". Psychologists Kostas A. Katsavdakis, J. Reid Meloy, and Stephen G. White wrote that San Marco likely had schizophrenia and that she "believed that she had to kill off her oppressors whom she held responsible for a failed life".

== Aftermath ==
The shootings were reportedly the first mass murder in Goleta's history and the first shooting homicide at a US Postal Service workplace since 1998. Graham's body in Santa Barbara was discovered by her boyfriend Edward Blomfield one day after the shooting on the night of January 31 and immediately linked to the shooting in Goleta.

Funeral services for the killed postal workers were held between February 3−10 in the counties of Santa Barbara and San Diego. The funeral of Charlotte Colton at Cavalry Cemetery was attended by over 1,200 mourners while that of Maleka Pineda was attended by 500. Goleta's mayor, Jonny Wallis, held a news conference in which she praised the police response, condemned the shooting, and offered her condolences to its victims.

The Goleta Processing and Distribution Center placed all 300 of its employees on paid leave for four days, resuming operations on February 3. During this time, an estimated 300,000 mail deliveries were delayed and newer mail was instead rerouted to the postal facility in Oxnard. Community West Bank in Goleta opened the Goleta Post Office Memorial Fund for donations to the victims' families. The American Postal Workers Union opened a donation fund for its five killed members. The Maleka Higgins Memorial Fund remained open as late as January 2007. The families of the victims were all paid out in life insurance as well as one-year of salary under an accidental death clause. On February 12, the postal facility victims were posthumously awarded the Presidential Medal of Freedom in a memorial ceremony by the US Postmaster General at the UC Santa Barbara Events Center. Incumbent Postmaster General John E. Potter was supposed to head the event, but because of grounded flights due to the North American blizzard of 2006, the medals were presented by Al Iniguez, the highest-ranking postal executive in California. On the one-year anniversary, a marble commemorative plaque was installed at the entrance of the postal facility. In addition, six olive trees were planted in remembrance of the six killed workers. There were initially no plans to improve security by the US Postal Inspection Service, although by 2014, new measures had been put in place.

In March 2006, Graham's family launched a civil lawsuit against Graham's boyfriend Edward Blomfield, who had provided a forged will claiming that Graham had left him her entire estate, worth between $600,000 and $750,000. Blomfield was ordered to pay $340,000 to Graham's family in restitution. Blomfield was arrested in January 2007 and later pled guilty to two counts of perjury as well as single counts burglary, financial elder abuse, forgery, and conspiracy. In March 2009, Blomfield was sentenced to one year imprisonment, followed by five years of probation. Three accomplices, Blomfield's sister Jeanne Blomfield, as well as Lenae Stahr and Heidi Hodges, were also found guilty of forgery, conspiracy, and perjury for providing false signatures as witnesses in the fake will.

== See also ==
- List of postal killings
- Going postal
- List of shootings in California
- 2014 Isla Vista attacks, occurred seven minutes away from Goleta
