= 1995 Montclair post office shooting =

Mass shooting in New Jersey, US

Montclair post office shooting
- Location: 40.8293828°N 74.2064503°W; Montclair, New Jersey, US
- Date: March 21, 1995; 31 years ago c. 3:55 p.m. – 4:00 p.m. (EDT)
- Attack type: Mass shooting, mass murder, workplace shooting, armed robbery
- Weapon: Taurus 9mm handgun
- Deaths: 4
- Injuries: 1
- Perpetrator: Christopher Green
- Motive: Robbery
- Verdict: Guilty
- Convictions: First-degree murder (four counts); Attempted murder (one count)

On March 21, 1995, a mass shooting took place at the Watchung Plaza's United States Postal Service office in Montclair, New Jersey, United States. A former employee, 29-year-old Christopher Green, killed four men (two employees and two customers), and injured another man during a robbery and stole more than $5,000 before fleeing on scene and being taken into custody afterward. He was sentenced to life in federal prison without parole in September 1995.

== Shooting ==
According to law enforcement, shortly before 4:00 p.m. ET, Green walked into the post office at Watchung Plaza several minutes before closing time and ordered its two employees and three customers to walk to a back room and lie down on the floor. Green methodically shot them one-by-one at close range. After killing the four men and wounding the other man, Green robbed the neighborhood office of more than $5,000 before fleeing on scene. Authorities confirmed that Green knew the two employees before the attack, and the injured victim helped identify Green as the assailant. Green used most of the stolen money to pay the back rent of his Montclair apartment.

== Victims ==
All four deceased men were identified as two employees and two customers at the post office. The employees were identified as 41-year-old Stanley Scott Walensky of Clifton and 56-year-old Ernest Spruill of Montclair. The customers were identified as 38-year-old Robert Leslie of Montclair and 59-year-old George Lomoga of Glen Ridge. Another customer and fifth victim, 44-year-old David Grossman of Montclair, survived the attack in critical but stable condition. He was flown by helicopter to the University Hospital in Newark where he treated his gunshot injuries to his face.

== Perpetrator ==
The perpetrator was identified by authorities as 29-year-old Christopher Green, a township public works and post office employee from East Orange, New Jersey. Montclair Police confirmed that Green worked for the post office as a temporary employee from July 16, 1992, until April 25, 1993. During that same time, he formerly worked for the Montclair Public Works Department where he made a total of $26,686 a year. Green played Little League Baseball, graduated from Immaculate Conception High School, and once trained to become an electrician's helper at the Essex County Vocational School. Green had no criminal history and otherwise only had a juvenile record for a minor offense as well as brief association with the Nation of Islam. Public Works Department co-workers described Green as a conscientious employee who came from a longtime middle-class Montclair family that is well-respected in the community.

== Arrest and trial ==
Shortly after his arrest the following day, investigators found a total of $2,000 in cash and a garbage bag from a trash bin outside his apartment. Some of the money were found underneath a refrigerator. Police also investigated Green's 1980 Oldsmobile, that was driven by him before the shooting. Its police chief also investigated a gym bag that contains bloodied clothing, three postal money orders and 13 rounds of ammunition for the handgun used in the shooting. On June 8, 1995, Green agreed to plead guilty on all four counts of first-degree murder and one count of attempted murder, and on September 21, 1995, Green was sentenced to life in federal prison without parole. As of 2026, Green remains incarcerated at the Federal Correctional Institution, McKean in McKean County, Pennsylvania.

== Legacy ==
A commemorative plaque was installed on Watchung Plaza. A tree was planted alongside the memorial.

== See also ==
- Edmond post office shooting
- Royal Oak post office shooting
