= Leymann Inventory of Psychological Terror =

New theorem

The Swedish psychologist and university professor Heinz Leymann developed the LIPT questionnaire. LIPT stands for Leymann Inventory of Psychological Terror.

== Structure ==
The LIPT questionnaire lists 45 mobbing actions at the workplace. A person is regarded as being bullied if one or more of the 45 actions happen at least once per week over a period of at least one year. Alternative mobbing definitions require a shorter period of at least 3–6 months and the frequent occurrence of more than one action.

The effects of the actions on the mobbing victim are divided into five categories:

1. Effects on self-expression and communication, e.g., the mobbing victim is constantly interrupted, criticized, or yelled at.
2. Effects on social contacts, e.g., colleagues and coworkers are forbidden to talk with the victim.
3. Effects on personal reputation, e.g., unfounded rumors about the mobbing victim are circulated.
4. Effects on occupational situation and quality of life, e.g., the victim is given meaningless jobs or tasks that affect the self-esteem.
5. Effects on physical health, e.g., threats of physical violence, damage to the workplace, or outright sexual harassment.

== Completeness ==
The 45 mobbing actions are derived by Leymann from 300 individual interviews in the years of 1981 to 1984. After 1984 the interviews did not find further actions and ended.

== See also ==
- Abuse
- Complex post-traumatic stress disorder
- Control freak
- Coworker backstabbing
- Cyber-aggression in the workplace
- Employee assistance programs
- Industrial and organizational psychology
- Malignant narcissism
- Micromanagement
- Narcissistic leadership
- Negligence in employment
- Occupational health psychology
- Office politics
- Power harassment
- Psychological manipulation
- Psychological trauma
- Queen bee syndrome
- Sexual harassment
- Snakes in Suits: When Psychopaths Go to Work
- Social undermining
- Toxic leader
- Toxic workplace
- Workplace aggression
- Workplace bullying
- Workplace harassment
- Workplace revenge
- Workplace stress
