= List of postal killings =

Postal killings in various countries resulted in fatalities that have occurred on the properties of postal systems or related issues/events. The main sections are divided by countries. Events are listed in chronological order.

== Australia ==
- December 17, 1926, Adelaide: fired postal worker James Hannivan shot and wounded two employees at Adelaide General Post Office, before committing suicide by shooting himself in the head.
- December 8, 1987, Queen Street massacre, Melbourne: Frank Vitkovic, former law student, entered an office building on Queen Street at 4:20 p.m. with the intent to murder a former school friend (who did not work for a postal department but for a credit union that was a tenant of the building) and kill as many people as possible before taking his own life. In the ensuing shooting spree eight people were killed and five injured. At around 4:30 p.m. after the gun was wrestled from him, he jumped to his death from the 11th floor. Most other floors were occupied by the offices of Australia Post and most victims were Australia Post office workers.

== Canada ==
- October 30, 1934, Quebec: Rosaire Bilodeau, ex-carrier of the Quebec postal service, drove five of his family members out into the woods, in two trips, and killed them. He then took 8 shots at postmaster Morin, senior mail clerk Moïse Jolicoeur, and divisional superintendent Oscar Fiset, killing Jolicoeur. Bilodeau was executed for the murders in 1935.

== Iran ==
- May 14, 2022, Ilam province: a former employee of the Mostazafan Foundation killed 3 workers and injured 5 more with a firearm. He later committed suicide.

== United States ==
- February 22, 1898, Lake City, South Carolina: African-American postmaster Frazier Baker and his two-year-old daughter, Julia, were shot to death by a white lynch mob. After numerous threats of violence by local whites over the previous year did not succeed in forcing Baker's resignation, the mob set the Baker home, which also served as the local post office, on fire in the early morning hours of February 22. Baker's wife and two eldest daughters, teenagers Rosa and Cora, were also shot by the mob, but were able to escape along with seven-year-old daughter Sarah and five-year-old daughter Millie.
- August 13, 1970, Los Angeles, California: Harry Sendrow, 54, a postal supervisor, was shot in the back three times by Alfred Kellum, 41, whom Sendrow had sent home for being intoxicated. Five hours later, Kellum was found unconscious and arrested. Police officers said he appeared to be intoxicated.
- March 22, 1975, Gadsden, Alabama: Floyd Davidson, a 47-year-old postal employee, was charged with two counts of first-degree murder in the fatal shooting of Gadsden Postmaster James Morris Ford, 59, and a postal tour(shift) superintendent, Eldred Curtis McDonald, 44.
- May 3, 1980, Eureka, California: Retired postal worker Henry Grossi shot and killed four of his neighbors and himself at two different homes. He had been depressed over the death of his wife ten months earlier.
- May 30, 1980, San Antonio, Texas: Rodolfo (Rudy) Elizondo, Jr., a 43-year-old postal employee and assistant branch manager, was shot six times at close range (some point blank) by another postal employee, James Bell, 42. Bell was found drinking while on duty. After initially fleeing, Bell returned with Elizondo and the branch manager, V.G Perez. Bell had fled to retrieve a gun which was used in the slaying.
- November 4, 1980, New Orleans, Louisiana: Curtis Collins, a disgruntled postal worker, shot and killed his supervisor, Adrienne Wharton, 34, and wounded a security guard with a high-powered rifle, in a second-floor office of a federal building near the Superdome. A postal employee said Collins had received a letter of reprimand from Wharton and slashed the tires on her car two days earlier. Collins was charged with murder and attempted murder.
- August 19, 1983, Johnston, South Carolina: Perry Smith, a resigned USPS employee, charged into the Johnston post office with a 12-gauge shotgun and fired at workers in a hall, killing postmaster Charles McGee, 49, and wounding two other employees.
- December 2, 1983, Anniston, Alabama: James Brooks, 53, entered the Anniston, Alabama post office with a .38-caliber pistol, killing postmaster Oscar Johnson, 49. Brooks then pursued his supervisor up the stairs and shot him twice, injuring him.
- March 6, 1985, Atlanta, Georgia: Steven Brownlee, a 12-year veteran of the postal service, opened fire on the night shift in the Atlanta main post office with a .22-caliber pistol, killing supervisor Warren Bailey, 45, and coworker Phillip Sciarrone, 32, and wounding another coworker in a mail sorting area.
- November 15, 1985, Manitou, Oklahoma: Forrest Albert Reffner, 39, was at the Manitou post office to check his elderly mother's mail when 74-year-old Arvell "Pete" Conner, armed with a .38-caliber, began arguing with Reffner before shooting and killing him inside the main post office.
- August 20, 1986, Edmond, Oklahoma: Patrick Sherrill, a part-time letter carrier, fatally shot 14 employees and wounded six at the Edmond post office. He subsequently committed suicide. This is the deadliest workplace shooting in US history and gave rise to the American phrase "going postal".
- December 14, 1988, New Orleans, Louisiana: Warren Murphy entered the New Orleans postal facility with a 12-gauge shotgun hidden under his clothing. During his work shift, after an incident with a supervisor, he reportedly went to the men's room and exited brandishing the shotgun. He non-fatally shot his supervisor in the face. The fired shot reportedly wounded two other employees. After the shooting, he held his ex-girlfriend hostage. Two FBI SWAT agents were also reportedly wounded upon finding Warren Murphy in a supervisor's office. He eventually surrendered to the agents.
- August 10, 1989, Escondido, California: John Merlin Taylor killed his wife Elizabeth, 50, then colleagues Richard Berni, 38, and Ronald Williams, 56, and himself at Orange Glen post office.
- October 10, 1991: Ex-postal worker Joseph M. Harris killed his ex-supervisor, Carol Ott, 30, and her boyfriend Cornelius Kasten, 36, at their home in Wayne, New Jersey, then killed two former colleagues, Donald McNaught, 63, and Johannes VanderPaauw, 59, as they arrived at the Ridgewood, New Jersey post office where they all previously worked. According to "Today in Rotten History", Harris was initially armed with an Uzi, grenades and a "samurai sword", and was later arrested after a 4½-hour standoff with police, garbed in a ninja's outfit and gas mask. He was convicted of murder and sentenced to death.
- November 14, 1991, Royal Oak, Michigan: In the Royal Oak post office shootings, fired postal worker Thomas McIlvane killed four and wounded five before killing himself.
- May 6, 1993, Dearborn, Michigan: Postal worker Larry Jasion killed co-worker Gary Montes, 34, and wounded three others before killing himself at a post office garage.
- May 6, 1993, Dana Point, California: Mark Richard Hilbun, a former postal employee, killed his mother Frances, 63, and her dog in their home. He then made his way to the post facility where he used to work and shot two postal workers, killing Charles Barbagallo, 41, and injuring the other. It was the beginning of a three-day rampage in which he injured several other people, prompted by Hilbun's dismissal for stalking another co-worker.
- March 21, 1995, Montclair, New Jersey: former postal employee Christopher Green killed four people, including two employees, and wounded a fifth at the Fairfield Street branch post office. While this is a postal killing, the primary motivation was apparently debt payment, and there was no indication that Green was mentally disturbed as a result of his former postal work.
- July 10, 1995, City of Industry, California: 25-year postal clerk Bruce Clark punched his supervisor James Whooper, 50, in the back of the head after an argument at the City of Industry mail processing center and left the work area. About ten minutes later, he returned with a brown paper bag. When Whooper asked what was in the bag, Clark reportedly pulled out a .38 revolver and shot Whooper twice at close range, once in the upper body and once in the face, killing him. Two employees reportedly took the gun away from Clark and held him until police arrived. Seventy-five postal employees reportedly witnessed the shooting.
- December 19, 1996, Las Vegas, Nevada: Former employee Charles Jennings went to the parking lot at the Las Vegas postal facility and fatally shot labor relations specialist James Brown, 59. Mr. Jennings reportedly indicated in his statement to investigators that Brown struggled to take the gun away from him and was shot in the process.
- September 2, 1997, Miami Beach, Florida: 21-year postal employee Jesus Antonio Tamayo shot his ex-wife and friend, then killed himself.
- December 20, 1997, Milwaukee, Wisconsin: Anthony Deculit killed coworker Russell Smith, 42, and wounded a supervisor and another coworker with a 9 mm pistol before killing himself.
- January 30, 2006, Goleta, California: Former mail processor Jennifer San Marco, 44, shot and killed seven people. San Marco murdered a former neighbor in Santa Barbara, then drove to the Santa Barbara USPS Processing and Distribution Center in Goleta and shot six postal employees. Five died immediately, while another died two days later at Santa Barbara Cottage Hospital. San Marco then committed suicide at the sorting facility.
- April 4, 2006, Baker City, Oregon: While on duty, Grant Gallaher, a letter carrier for 13 years, reportedly went home and got his .357 Magnum revolver and drove to the city post office with intent to kill the postmaster. Arriving at the parking lot, he ran over his supervisor several times. After unsuccessfully searching the building for the postmaster, he returned to the parking lot and shot his supervisor Lori Kotter, 49, several times at close range, ostensibly to ensure she was dead. He reportedly then fired three bullets at the windshield of her car and three more into the hood. Gallaher was on a new route for three weeks and had felt pressured by a week-long work-time study and extra time added to his new route.
- November 28, 2006, San Francisco, California: 39-year-old Julius Kevin Tartt, an 18-year employee working at the Napoleon Street Carrier Annex in San Francisco, went to his supervisor 53-year-old Genevieve Paez's residence armed with a revolver and shot her in the back of the head outside her house. He then reportedly left the scene and fatally shot himself in the head the following day. Early in the investigation, homicide investigators examined disputes between Tartt and Paez, including what one police official referred to as a discipline issue. A homicide official stated that there were indications that Tartt was dissatisfied with work and with Paez.
- December 23, 2017, Dublin, Ohio: 24-year-old DeShaune Stewart, in response to his pending dismissal, shot and killed his supervisor Lance Herrera-Dempsey, 52, and then shoved postmaster Ginger Ballard, 53, to the ground in a parking lot, causing fatal head trauma. Stewart had been under investigation by the U.S. Postal Service prior to the incident. In September 2019, Stewart was found not guilty of his crimes by reason of insanity.
- October 12, 2021, Memphis, Tennessee: 28-year-old Johntra Haley, a USPS city carrier assistant, killed two of his coworkers James Wilson, 47, and Demetria Dortch, 37, and himself at the USPS East Lamar carrier annex facility.
- October 20, 2022, Chattanooga, Tennessee: 27-year-old Brian Simmons, a USPS worker, shot and killed his supervisor Cody Ransom, 30. Simmons then fled the scene and crashed into a nail salon and FedEx. Simmons was found dead inside of his crashed truck from a self-inflicted gunshot wound.

== See also ==
- Going postal
- Son of Sam
