= Workplace bullying in academia =

Bullying in academia is a form of workplace bullying which takes place at institutions of higher education, such as colleges and universities in a wide range of actions. It is believed to be common, although has not received as much attention from researchers as bullying in some other contexts. Academia is highly competitive and has a well defined hierarchy, with junior staff being particularly vulnerable. Although most universities have policies on workplace bullying, individual campuses develop and implement their own protocols. This often leaves victims with no recourse.

Academic mobbing is a sophisticated form of bullying where academics gang up to diminish the intended victim through intimidation, unjustified accusations, humiliation, and general harassment. These behaviors are often invisible to others and difficult to prove. Victims of academic mobbing may suffer from stress, depression and suicidal thoughts, as well as post-traumatic stress disorder.

== Workplace bullying ==
Bullying is a longstanding and pervasive pattern of behavior, by an individual or group, which has the conscious intention to hurt, threaten, frighten or cause stress for an individual who has little or no means to protect themselves.

Workplace bullying includes the following categories.

- Threats to professional status, such as public humiliation or belittling.
- Threats to social status, such as teasing, insults and name-calling.
- Isolation, such as withholding information and preventing access to opportunities including workshops or meetings.
- Overwork, such as setting impossible deadlines and making unnecessary disruptions.
- Destabilization, for example setting meaningless tasks, not giving proper credit for accomplishments, removal from positions of authority without reasonable justification, and gaslighting.

== Bullying and academic culture ==
Several aspects of academia lend themselves to the practice and discourage its reporting and mitigation, due to concerns of possible damage to the reputation of the institution. Its leadership is usually drawn from the ranks of faculty, most of whom have not received the management training that could enable an effective response to such situations. There have been cases of tenured professors acting as perpetrators of academic bullying, leading to the dismissal of the perpetrators or of their targets. Victims include the increasing number of adjunct professors as well as students, cf. Bullying of students in higher education.

The generally decentralized nature of academic institutions can make it difficult for victims to seek recourse, and appeals to outside authority have been described as "the kiss of death." Therefore, academics who are subject to bullying in workplace are often cautious about reporting any problems. Social media has recently been used to expose or allege bullying in academia anonymously.

Although tenure and post-tenure review lead to interdepartmental evaluation, and all three culminate in an administrative decision, bullying is commonly a function of administrative input before or during the early stages of intradepartmental review. A series of publications in Nature emphasize the need for improving institutional reporting systems for academic bullying.

=== Mobbing ===
Mobbing is endemic at universities because universities are a type of organization that encourages mobbing. Academic victims of bullying may also be particularly conflict-averse.

Kenneth Westhues' study of mobbing in academia found that vulnerability was increased by personal differences such as being a foreigner or of a different sex; by working in a field that embraces a post-modern esthetic such as music or literature; financial pressure; or having an aggressive superior. Other factors included envy, heresy and campus politics.

Morteza Mahmoudi proposed some strategies to address academic bullying including mobbing. While potentially helpful for trainee targets of academic bullying, some of these same strategies can be appropriated by administrators or regular faculty members to greatly expand the scope of an existing academic mobbing campaign against a less powerful or popular colleague.

== Manifestations ==
The bullying in this workplace has been described as somewhat more subtle than usual. Its recipients may be the target of unwanted physical contact, violence, obscene or loud language during meetings, be disparaged among their colleagues in venues they are not aware of and face difficulties when seeking promotion. It may also be manifested by undue demands for compliance with regulations.

These workplaces constitute what is known as "toxic research culture," encompassing a range of harmful practices such as bullying, harassment, poor employment terms, inadequate diversity and inclusion practices, breaches of research integrity, and the relentless pursuit of higher league table positions, H-indices, and impact factors. A particularly troubling manifestation is 'ghost authoring,' where senior researchers take undue credit for work primarily done by junior staff. These cultures are fostered by short-term contracts, inadequate salaries for early-career researchers, competitive work environments, and relentless pressure to publish. The core issue is a hierarchical structure that grants substantial power to senior researchers, creating a cycle where junior researchers must endure harsh conditions to advance their careers.

== Effects ==
The kinds of abusive behaviors in academic bullying cause serious and long-lasting effects on both the academic and personal lives of targets and their families. In addition, academic bullying behaviours can affect the progress of science. Victims of academic mobbing may suffer from stress, depression and suicidal ideation as well as posttraumatic stress disorder. The psychological scars have been described as comparable to rape, and they may not heal for many years. Some cases end in suicide, although the precise prevalence of this outcome is not known.

A 2008 study of the topic, conducted on the basis of a survey at a Canadian university, concluded that the practice had several unproductive costs, including increased employee turnover.

== Incidence ==
Similarly to studies in general workplace bullying, incidence of academic bullying can vary substantially depending on the specific workplace studied and the definitions used. There is up to one-quarter or one-third of academics who declare they have been bullied in the past year. This is considerably higher compared to other workplaces, with 10-14% workers declaring having experienced bullying in the past year in the United States, but less than in healthcare, where a studies in 17 Greek hospitals reported that half of the doctors and nurses reported they had experienced bullying. Around 40% say they have witnessed or heard about bullying behaviors happening to someone else. One of the largest studies of bullying in universities, surveying 14,000 higher-education staff over 92 institutions in the United Kingdom, found the rate of bullying varied widely across institutions, from 2% to 19% of the staff at each university reporting being always or often bullied.

In 2008 the United Kingdom's University and College Union released the results of a survey taken among its 9,700 members. 51% of respondents said they had never been bullied, 16.7% that they had occasionally experienced it, and 6.7% that they were "always" or "often" subjected to bullying. The results varied by member institutions, with respondents from the University of East London reporting the highest incidence.

The Times Higher Education commissioned a survey in 2005 and received 843 responses. Over 40% reported they had been bullied, with 33% reporting "unwanted physical contact" and 10% reporting physical violence; about 75% reported they were aware that co-workers had been bullied. The incidence rate found in this survey was higher than that usually found via internal polling (12 to 24 percent).

According to a survey conducted in 2021 by NOS op 3 among science PhD candidates enrolled at universities across the Netherlands, the most common forms of bullying included sexual misconduct, discrimination and violations of scientific standards. Approximately 50% of the PhD students interviewed, whose number was approximately a hundred, reported that they had experienced inappropriate behavior in terms of unreasonable workload, inability to ask critical questions, teasing, intimidation, social exclusion and not receiving credits for their work. Among international students, the most common experiences included sexism, racism and sexually inappropriate behavior. One of the identified reasons for the unreasonable workload and the unhealthy working conditions of PhD students include competition for research funds (primarily provided by the largest subsidizer, the Dutch Research Council) among professors running a research group. Research conducted by the Federation of Dutch Trade Unions and the Dutch Research School of Philosophy found similar results to those reported by NOS op 3 with the conclusion of the latter being that "58% of PhD students had an increased risk of developing a psychiatric condition like depression" or burnout.

Author C. K. Gunsalus describes the problem as "low incidence, high severity", analogous to research misconduct. She identifies the aggressors' misuse of the concepts of academic freedom and collegiality as a commonly used strategy.

University bullying policies and processes are open to misuse, however, and the AAUP notes that faculty who dissent on academic governance issues or who complain about workplace inequities may become the target for retaliatory bullying complaints aimed to silence unpopular views.

== Bullying of medical students ==
In a 2005 British study, around 35% of medical students reported having been bullied. Around one in four of the 1,000 students questioned said they had been bullied by a doctor, while one in six had been bullied by a nurse. Manifestations of bullying included:

- being humiliated by teachers in front of patients
- being victimised for not having come from a "medical family"
- being put under pressure to carry out a procedure without supervision.

In 2019, The Lancet journal proposed a need for establishment of a global committee on academic behaviour ethics to consider academic bullying reports in a robust, fair, and unbiased manner.

== See also ==
- Academic dishonesty
- Bullying of students in higher education
- Bullying in medicine
- Bullying in teaching
- Campus rape
- Hazing
- Mobbing
- Ragging
- School bullying
- Scientific misconduct
- Sexual harassment in education
- Sham peer review
- Student prank
- Workplace bullying
- Workplace incivility
