= Spree killer =

Person killing in multiple locations in a short time

A spree killer is someone who commits a criminal act that involves two or more murders in a short time, often in multiple locations. The traditional distinction between a spree killer from other types of murderers is that they kill several people over a short amount of time, usually in an amount of days, which is contrasted from a serial killer that kills more sporadically. Spree killers are also driven by different motives than serial and mass murderers.

== Definition ==
The general definition of spree murder is two or more murders committed by a person (or people) with no cooling-off period, in contrast to serial murder, where there is a period of time between killings. Serial killers commit murders in separate events, at different times. Mass murderers are defined by one incident, with no distinctive period between the murders.

The United States Bureau of Justice Statistics has defined a spree killing as "killings at two or more locations with almost no time break between murders".

The Encyclopedia of Crime and Punishment lists five different categories of spree killers and cites Mark O. Barton as an example of the second one. He is also noted alongside mass murderers, such as Patrick Sherrill, in the respective entry about mass murder. In The Anatomy of Motive, John E. Douglas cites Charles Starkweather and Andrew Cunanan (who murdered five people over three months) as examples of spree killers, while Jack Levin calls Starkweather a mass murderer and Cunanan a serial killer.

In Controversial Issues in Criminology, Fuller and Hickey write that "[t]he element of time involved between murderous acts is primary in the differentiation of serial, mass, and spree murderers", later elaborating those spree killers "will engage in the killing acts for days or weeks" while the "methods of murder and types of victims vary". Andrew Cunanan is given as an example of spree killing, while Charles Whitman is mentioned in connection with mass murder and Jeffrey Dahmer with serial killing.

In Serial Murder, Ronald M. Holmes and Stephen T. Holmes defines spree murder as "the killing of three or more people within a 30-day period" and add that killing sprees are "usually accompanied by the commission of another felony." They cite Charles Starkweather and the Beltway Snipers as examples of spree killers. They define serial murder as "the killing of three or more people over a period of more than 30 days, with a significant cooling-off period between the killings."

In Sexual Homicide, Ressler, Burgess and Douglas gave more emphasis to killings being at more than one location, and less precision about the time span, saying that a single event can last a short or long time, citing Christopher Wilder's seven-week "murder event" or "killing spree".

Douglas wrote that the identity of serial killers is generally unknown until they are caught, and a mass murderer's identity is learned only after they have committed the crime. The identity of the spree killer, on the other hand, usually becomes known by police while the spree is still in progress.

The term rampage killer has also been used sometimes to describe spree killers, especially when a single individual perpetrator:

A rampage involves the (attempted) killing of multiple persons at least partly in public space by a single physically present perpetrator using (potentially) deadly weapons in a single event without any cooling-off period.

== See also ==
- Active shooter
- Going postal
- List of rampage killers
- Mass shooting
- Massacre
- Running amok
- Thrill killing
