= Heinz Leymann =

Swedish psychologist

Heinz Leymann (17 July 1932 – 26 January 1999) was a Swedish academic, famous for his studies on mobbing among humans. He held a degree in pedagogical psychology, and another one in psychiatry and worked as a psychologist. He was a professor at Umeå University.

== Academic background ==
Born in 1932 in Wolfenbüttel, Germany, Leymann, became a Swedish citizen in the mid-1950s, and was awarded his PhD in pedagogical psychology from Stockholm University in 1978. He then went on to get another research doctorate (doktor i medicinsk vetenskap, "doctor of medical science," typically translated into English as PhD) in psychiatry in 1990 from Umeå University. Somewhat unusually, his doctorate in psychiatry was based on his clinical background as a psychologist; he did not go through medical training.

== Leymann's work on mobbing ==
Leymann pioneered research into mobbing in the 1980s. His initial research in the area was based on detailed case studies of a number of nurses who had committed or tried to commit suicide due to events at the workplace. He developed the Leymann Inventory of Psychological Terror (LIPT), a questionnaire of 45 mobbing actions.

Although he preferred the term bullying in the context of school children, some have come to regard mobbing as a form of group bullying. As professor and practicing psychologist, Leymann also noted one of the side-effects of mobbing is post-traumatic stress disorder and is frequently misdiagnosed.

Among researchers who have built on Leymann's work are:

- Davenport, Schwartz & Elliott
- Hecker
- Shallcross, Ramsay & Barker
- Westhues
- Zapf & Einarsen

== See also ==
- Leymann Inventory of Psychological Terror
- Workplace bullying
