= Bullying of students in higher education =

Bullying of students in higher education refers to the bullying of students taking place at institutions of higher education such as colleges and universities. It is believed to be common although it has not received as much attention from researchers as bullying in some other contexts. This article focuses on bullying of students; see workplace bullying in academia regarding faculty and staff.

In a higher education environment bullying and similar behaviors may include hazing, harassment or stalking.

18.5% of college undergraduates have reported being bullied once or twice, while 22% report being the victim of cyberbullying. All students, regardless of race, weight, gender, ethnicity, etc., can be targeted as victims of bullying. Two research articles have examined bullying at the post-secondary level in great detail. These articles both appeared in the journal Adolescence in 2004 and 2006. It is estimated that 100,000 students drop out of college each year due to bullying.

== Hazing ==
Hazing is the practice of rituals and other activities involving harassment, abuse or humiliation as a way of initiating a person into a group. Hazing is seen in many different types of social groups, including gangs, sports teams, schools, military units, fraternities and sororities. Hazing is often prohibited by law and may comprise either physical or psychological abuse. It may also include nudity or sexually oriented offenses.

More than half of hazing incidents on college campuses result in pictures publicly posted on the Internet. Students have reported that they are not adequately exposed to hazing prevention programs on campuses. Two out of every five college students acknowledge incidents of hazing on their campus according to RA Magazine. 55% of college students who are involved in campus clubs, teams and other organizations have reported being hazed in some form.

== Cyberbullying ==
Cyberbullying is the use of electronic communication to bully a person, typically by sending messages of an intimidating or threatening nature. This form of bullying can easily go undetected because of lack of parental/authoritative supervision. Because bullies can pose as someone else, it is the most anonymous form of bullying. Cyberbullying includes, but is not limited to, abuse using email, instant messaging, text messaging, websites, social networking sites, etc. In a study performed at Indiana State University, it was determined that electronic media such as social networking and text messaging are more common outlets for cyberbullying, while chat rooms and other websites are less likely to be used in cyberbullying.

Once a young adult enters college, there is little to no computer monitoring, leading to the misuse of technology and the added probability of cyberbullying.

There have been occasions where the bullying was not intentional, but still occurred. Even if the bullying was not consciously intended it can still have awful impacts. One study concluded that people had been ostracised online as a way of protecting another group of people. One woman had been listed as a political opponent on a pro-trans website due to misunderstandings and alternating views, which resulted in targeted messages and harassment. The listed person in question did not actually have any reservations against the trans community, and so they ended up being the bullied person. While the motivations of the authors of the website are unknown, it can be assumed that they did not specifically aim to target the person effected and thus the bullying was an inconsiderate result.

== Techniques ==
According to an article in the Chronicle of Higher Education, academic bullies have initiated a variety of covert behaviors used to target their victims. These subtle actions include interruptions during group meetings, eye-rolling, undermining credibility, and exclusion from social interactions. Because of these techniques, bullying in academia is considered to be of a lower intensity.

== Reasons ==
NoBullying.com lists a variety of reasons that bullying in college occurs. The first reason is that there are new targets available to the bully’s disclosure. The bully has said goodbye to the people he or she previously socialized with and/or bullied, so there is a need to satisfy such behaviors.

Another reason is there is less direct authority. Leaving for college introduces many students to their first time on their own without the interference of parents and guardians. Faculty and staff are less interested in interpersonal relationships between their students and thus pay less attention to classroom dynamics as opposed to the attention a high school teacher might provide. College faculty and staff follow research that encourages them to take a backseat to bullying and allow the students to overcome adversity on their own.

Students at most universities and colleges are not afforded the luxury of leaving after the school day as they would in highschool. Most have to spend time outside of school with their classmates whether they choose to or not. In college, a majority of the campuses are residential and thus students may see much more of their potential bullies and/or victims.

Roommate conflicts inside the residential dorms can lead to active bullying. In fall 2012, a Rutgers University student committed suicide after his roommate had been filming him and his boyfriend engaging in sexual activities and posted the video online for all to see. The roommate said he did not want him dead, but wanted his friends to know he was disgusted by his behavior.

== Locations ==
Lynne McDougall uncovered, in her study of bullying in higher education, that the majority of the locations where bullying occurs in colleges were quite conventional.

A majority of the bullying is reported as occurring in the same corridor or department, thus suggesting that students within the same groups, divisions or under the same faculty are responsible for the bullying of their peers. Entrance ways of buildings are another prime location for bullying to occur. Entrances and exit ways are common areas where students have the opportunity to smoke and socialize in between their classes.

The library was deemed an area of bullying in McDougall’s study as well, hinting that bullying occurs in places where little to no supervision or control is present.

The advancement of technology in the classroom has allowed for cyberbullying to occur while students are gathered for the intent of education. Social media websites such as Twitter, allow students to actively post content bashing their classmates. College-specific accounts have been created where members of the student body can send posts and messages to an administrator who then retweets or posts the content for all the account’s followers to read.

== Legality ==
Colleges are not mandated to produce strategies or policies regarding anti-bullying, however some have codes of conduct that encourage students to exhibit appropriate behavior at all times. In most codes of conduct the word bullying is never cited in the physical text.

“Both the perpetrators and the victims are adults, so the legal framework is very, very different,” said Charlie Rose, the U.S. Department of Education’s general counsel. The difference between bullying and sexual harassment is the added context of sexuality. Sexual harassment is defined as unwelcome conduct of a sexual nature that interferes with a student’s ability to learn, work, achieve or participate in activities. This can include unwanted sexual advances, sexual touching, requests for sexual favors, or other verbal, nonverbal and physical actions of a sexual nature. This includes spreading sexual rumors, making sexual comments, jokes, gestures, vandalism, pictures, written materials, rating students sexually and circulating Web content of a sexual nature. Human resource departments may be used to address bullying among faculty and staff, while judicial review committees apply sanctions and regulations to students charged with harassment of their peers.

== See also ==
- Bullying
- Cyberbullying
- Hazing
- School violence
- Social exclusion
- Social isolation
