= Gunsalus =

Gunsalus is a surname. Notable people with the surname include:

- Catherine Gunsalus González (born 1934), American Presbyterian minister and historian
- C. K. Gunsalus (fl. 1978), American ethicist
- Irwin Gunsalus (1912–2008), American biochemist
