= Carol Thrush =

Ethicist and medical educator

Carol R. Thrush is an ethicist and medical educator at the University of Arkansas for Medical Sciences. She is one of the co-founders of the Survey of Organizational Research Climate (SOURCE) at the National Center for Professional and Research Ethics (ncpre).

== Education ==
Per her ncpre biosketch, Thrush received BA and MA degrees in psychology from the University of West Florida, and a Ph.D. in Higher Education Leadership from the University of Arkansas, Little Rock.

== Career ==
Thrush studies the organizational behavior of large research institutions, and evaluates their workplace and intellectual culture using the SOURCE instrument. First developed in 2009 by Thrush, Martinson, C.K. Gunsalus, and others, the survey has since been expanded to targeted environments such as Veterans Affairs and three R1 universities.
