= Edmond post office shooting =

1986 mass shooting in Oklahoma, U.S.

- Location: 35.657971°N 97.480137°W; Edmond, Oklahoma, U.S.
- Date: August 20, 1986; 40 years ago c. 7:00 – 7:15 a.m. (UTC−05:00)
- Target: Postal workers
- Attack type: Mass shooting; mass murder; murder-suicide; workplace shooting
- Weapons: Two M1911 .45 caliber semi-automatic pistols; Ruger MK II .22-caliber pistol (perpetrator's suicide)
- Deaths: 15 (including the perpetrator)
- Injuries: 6
- Perpetrator: Patrick Henry Sherrill
- Motive: Revenge due to previous reprimands; Disgruntlement towards employer

The Edmond post office shooting was a mass shooting that occurred in Edmond, Oklahoma, on August 20, 1986. In less than fifteen minutes, 44-year-old postal worker Patrick Sherrill pursued and shot several coworkers, killing 14 and injuring another 6, before committing suicide. It is currently the deadliest workplace shooting in U.S. history by a lone gunman, as well as the deadliest mass shooting by a lone gunman in the state of Oklahoma.

The attack, among other similar incidents of violence perpetrated by postal workers, inspired the American phrase "going postal".

== Background ==
Sherrill was a relief carrier, meaning he was often required to work alternate routes on different days, a position dictated by his rank on the seniority list. His lack of a permanently assigned route meant that he lacked the same job stability as other USPS workers. Opinions vary concerning his job performance. Some reports portray him as an erratic, irritable worker; others claim he performed well and was being badgered by management. On the afternoon of August 19, 1986, supervisors Esser and Bland reprimanded Sherrill for his behavior. Sherrill had threatened revenge twice out of anger at being disciplined.

== Shooting ==
On August 20, 1986, Sherrill arrived at his workplace, having armed himself with three semi-automatic pistols along with extra ammunition, which he had concealed in a mail bag. After entering the building, he locked the doors behind him. Shortly after 7:00 a.m., he shot and killed Richard Esser Jr., one of two supervisors who had verbally disciplined him the previous day. Sherrill then sought out Bill Bland, another supervisor who had reprimanded him. However, Bland had overslept that morning and arrived an hour late to work, by which time the shootings were already over. Not finding Bland, Sherrill then killed co-worker Paul Michael Rockne (grandson of football coach Knute Rockne) and sought more co-workers to kill.

At the time of the attack, around 100 workers occupied the facility. In total, Sherrill killed 14 people and wounded 6 others. The shooting ended after Sherrill Used Ruger MK II .22-caliber pistol committed suicide by shooting himself in the forehead as police entered the facility.

== Victims ==
Fourteen people were killed in the shooting, while six others were injured.

List of victims

- Patricia Ann Chambers, 41
- Judy Stephens Denney, 41
- Richard C. Esser Jr. 38
- Patricia A. Gabbard, 47
- Jonna Ruth Gragert, 30
- Patty Jean Husband, 48
- Betty Ann Jarred, 34
- William F. Miller, 30
- Kenneth W. Morey, 49
- Leroy Orrin Phillips, 42
- Jerry Ralph Pyle, 51
- Paul Michael Rockne, 33
- Thomas Wade Shader Jr., 31
- and Patti Lou Welch, 27.

=== Memorial ===
Memorial to the 1986 post office incident in Edmond, Oklahoma

The Yellow Ribbon Memorial is a commemorative outdoor structure dedicated to the victims of the Edmond, Oklahoma post office shooting. Dedicated on May 29, 1989, it is located outside the post office's main entry to the south. The memorial contains the bronze statue of a man and a woman standing atop the fountain's center base and holding the ribbon whose bow is attached to the base. To represent the fourteen victims killed in the shooting, the fountain contains fourteen water jets and a plaque on the front of the base listing their names.

The memorial was built by the Edmond community and the United States Postal Service; the statue was created by sculptor Richard Muno (1939–2015). Community members have gathered at the memorial to commemorate the victims, especially on the 25th (2011) and 30th (2016) anniversaries.

The memorial was surveyed in May 1996 as "well maintained", categorized by the Smithsonian American Art Museum. Over the years, the memorial slowly deteriorated with apparent "cracks in the concrete". Throughout the early 2010s, operations of the fountain were halted for, according to USPS, "a damaged water supply line". As of 2016, the fountain still operates seasonally.

== Perpetrator ==
Patrick Henry Sherrill (November 13, 1941 – August 20, 1986) was born in Watonga, Oklahoma, and had served in the United States Marine Corps. Sherrill was described as a loner by those who knew him. He was considered an expert marksman, gaining experience in small-arms through being in the Oklahoma Air National Guard, where he was a member of a pistol team.

== Subsequent postal shooting incidents ==
The 1986 Edmond incident was the first of several highly publicized postal shootings.

- 1991, Ridgewood, New Jersey
- 1991, Royal Oak, Michigan
- 1993, Dana Point, California
- 1995, Montclair, New Jersey
- 2006, Goleta, California

== See also ==
- Virginia Beach shooting (2019) — a similar shooting that targeted a workplace
- Mass shootings in the United States
- Gun violence in the United States
- List of rampage killers (workplace killings)
- Workplace violence
  - Organizational conflict
  - Workplace aggression
