= Royal Oak post office shooting =

Mass shooting in Royal Oak, Michigan

Royal Oak post office shootings
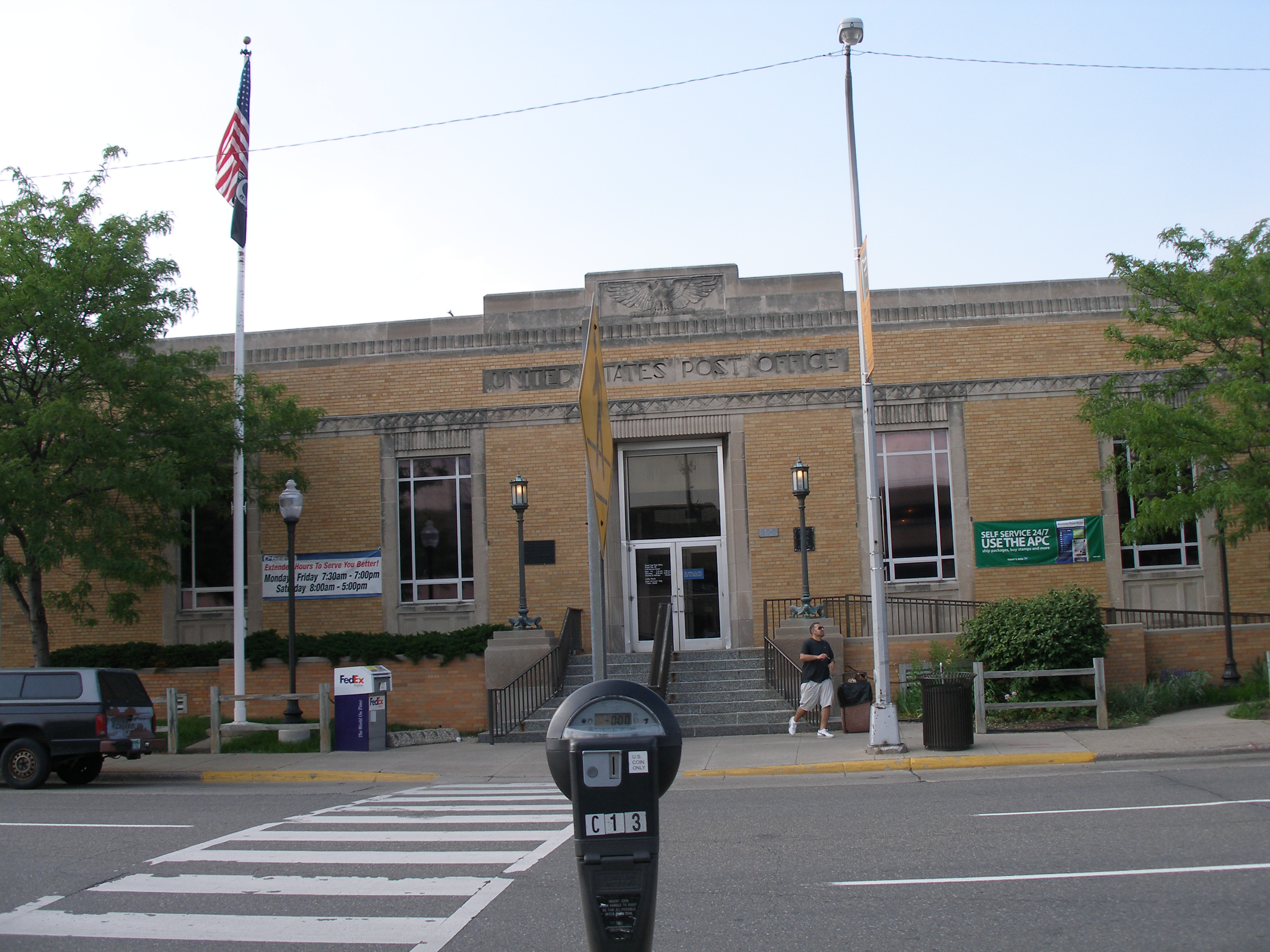
- Royal Oak Post Office, 2009
- Location: 42.4893°N 83.1461°W; 200 W. 2nd Street, Royal Oak, Michigan, U.S.
- Date: November 14, 1991; 34 years ago
- Attack type: Mass shooting, mass murder, murder-suicide
- Weapon: .22-caliber Ruger 10/22 semi-automatic rifle
- Deaths: 5 (including the perpetrator)
- Injuries: 7 (4 by gunfire)
- Perpetrator: Thomas McIlvane
- Motive: Retaliation for being fired and workplace aggression

On November 14, 1991, a mass shooting occurred at the United States Post Office in Royal Oak, Michigan, United States. In the incident, a disgruntled former postal worker, identified as 31-year-old Thomas McIlvane, shot and killed four post office employees before committing suicide.

== Background ==
The shooter was Thomas Paul McIlvane, a 31-year-old former letter carrier, former professional kickboxer, and former U.S. Marine. He had been given a general discharge from the Marines after driving a tank over a car following an argument with officers.

McIlvane later became employed as a mail carrier, a job which he told friends was "a perfect job for him, because he worked outdoors with no bosses over his shoulder". He was fired by the US Postal Service on July 31, 1990, for calling a supervisor and swearing. Some employees reported that McIlvane had been singled out and written up repeatedly "for baloney-type things".

McIlvane filed a grievance and then pursued arbitration to get his job back. The arbitration took place in October 1991 and lasted two days. At the hearing, McIlvane told a union official that, if he did not get reinstated, he would make the 1986 Edmond post office shooting "look like Disneyland". One of McIlvane's former supervisors tried to file criminal charges for alleged threats, but McIlvane was acquitted by a jury in early 1991. McIlvane's threats were relayed to one of the bosses at the Royal Oak post office and resulted in the revocation of his gun permit. Word spread to workers in Royal Oak, who planned escape routes to follow if McIlvane returned.

On November 13, 1991, he learned that the arbitration case had been decided against him.

Prior to the attack, McIlvane left a voicemail message for one of the supervisors involved in the arbitration saying, "I'm going to blow everything away ... I'll kill you, too." Multiple requests were made to the United States Postal Inspection Service, the law enforcement arm of the Postal Service, for additional security, but no security was sent to Royal Oak.

== Shooting ==
At approximately 8:45 a.m. on November 14, 1991, McIlvane returned to the Royal Oak post office, walked through an open door at the loading dock to the rear of the building, and opened fire using a semiautomatic .22-caliber Ruger carbine with the stock cut off. He shot and killed four employees, wounded four others, and then shot himself in the head. He died from his headshot on the following day.

The four workers killed by McIlvane were:

- Mary Ellen Benincasa, 32, of Clinton Township, an injury compensation specialist, shot in the right shoulder and chest;
- Christopher Carlisle, 33, of Rochester Hills, manager of branch operations, shot in the head;
- Keith Ciszewski, 37, of Livonia, a labor relations assistant, died of gunshot wounds;
- Rose Marie Proos, 33, of Sterling Heights, postal supervisor, shot in the chest.

Others injured in the shootings were:

- Allen Adams, 47, of Oceola Township, temporarily assigned to Royal Oak, shot near the bridge of the nose;
- Clark French, 36, of Sterling Heights, letter carrier, gunshot wounds in the chest, liver, colon, and gallbladder;
- Joal White, 45, of Warren, postal supervisor, shot in the face;
- Sue Johnson, 37, of Berkley, shot in the pelvis;
- Gwendolyn Thornton, 36 of Troy, assistant postal supervisor, fractures in the heel received from jumping from a second-floor window;
- Vivian Dove, 44, of Warren, personnel clerk, back injured while diving under a desk;
- James West, 55, of Berkley, postal employee, lacerations to his hand.

The shootings were the fifth shooting incident at post offices over a six-year period.

== Aftermath ==
Congress investigated the shootings, including more than 100 interviews, and released its report in June 1992. William L. Clay, chairman of the House Committee on Post Office and Civil Service, described the Royal Oak Post Office as a "powder keg" and pointed that "autocratic, para-military management techniques used there helped create an environment that drove a man to kill". Sander Levin, a Congressman from Michigan, opined: "There were numerous red flags ... but all warnings were ignored. In essence, the Postal Service was asleep at the switch."

In his book The Tainted Eagle, Charlie Withers wrote: "The environment was so tense, it is hard to describe the hatred that was felt against management due to the way they mentally bullied the workforce." Withers wrote that much of the staff's ire was directed at branch manager Carlisle: "I'm sure a lot of people at one time or another fantasized about killing Carlisle. Not anyone in this group from carriers to clerk, mail handler to personnel staff would shed a tear for that monster."

In May 1993, the Detroit Free Press reported that, after the shootings, the Postal Service eliminated the management at the Royal Oak post office. The president of the local Letter Carriers union reported that conditions were improved: "It's like night and day. The daily confrontation is gone."

== See also ==
- List of postal killings
- List of homicides in Michigan

== Bibliography ==
- Withers, Charlie (2009). The Tainted Eagle: the Truth Behind the Tragedy; A Preventable Tragedy and the Coverup of the Royal Oak post Office Shootings on November 14, 1991. Xlibris Corporation LLC. p. 17. ISBN 9781436396417.
