= Workplace violence =

Assault, abuse or threat that occurs in the workplace

Nurses describe their experience as victims of, or as witnesses of, violence in the workplace

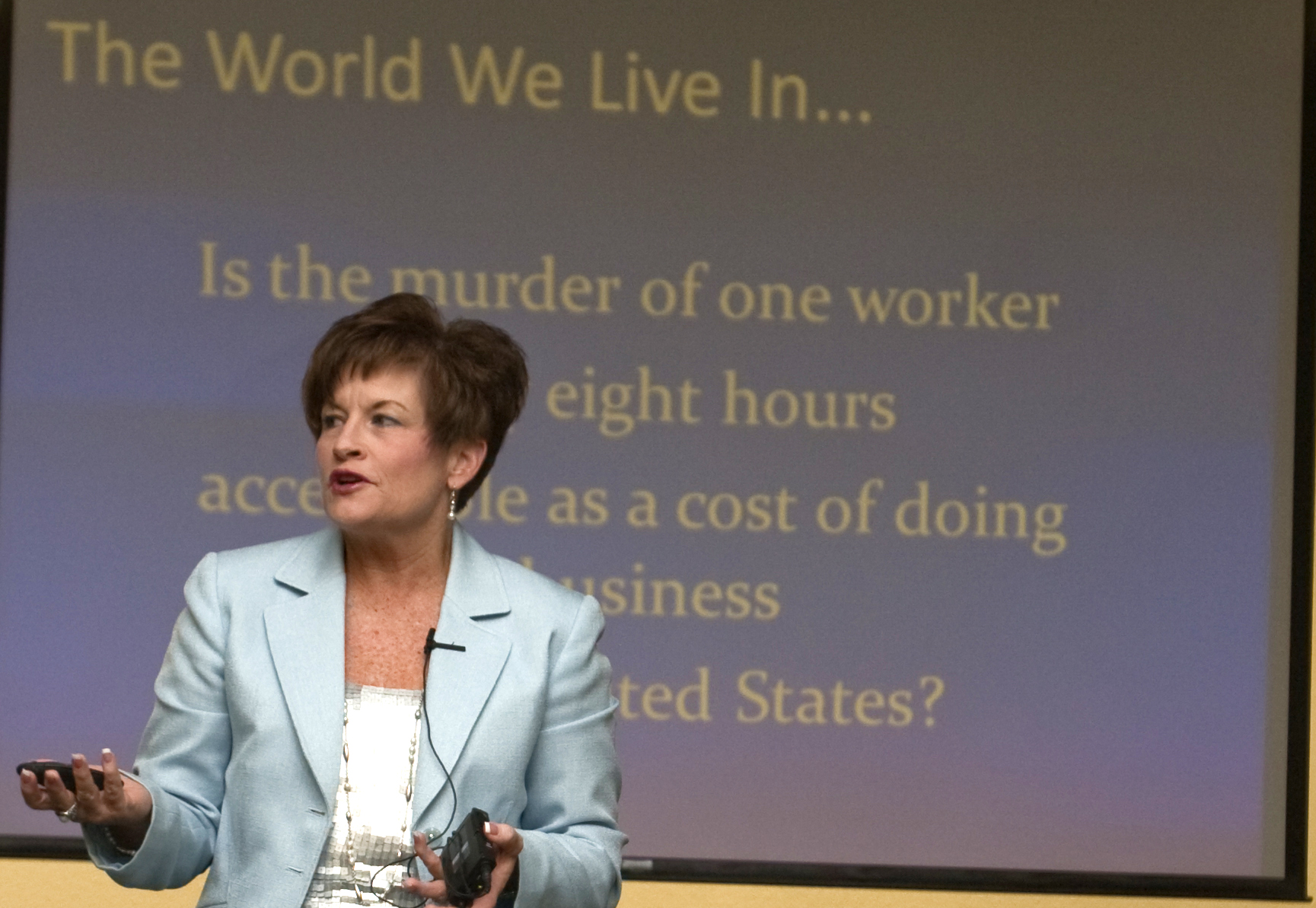
Deborah R. Collins, a survivor of workplace violence in the 1988 shooting at Electromagnetic System Labs, discusses the consequences of workplace violence.

Workplace violence, violence in the workplace, or occupational violence refers to violence, usually in the form of physical abuse or threat, that creates a risk to the health and safety of an employee or multiple employees. The National Institute for Occupational Safety and Health defines worker on worker, personal relationship, customer/client, and criminal intent all as categories of violence in the workplace. These four categories are further broken down into three levels: Level one displays early warning signs of violence, Level two is slightly more violent, and level three is significantly violent. Many workplaces have initiated programs and protocols to protect their workers as the Occupational Health Act of 1970 states that employers must provide an environment in which employees are free of harm or harmful conditions.

== Epidemiology ==
According to data from the US Bureau of Labor Statistics, in 2011 violence and other injuries caused by persons or animals contributed to 17% of all US occupational fatalities, with homicides contributing to 10% of the total. From 1992 to 2010, there were 13,827 reported workplace homicide victims, averaging over 700 victims per year, in the United States. Examination of the 2011 data shows that while a majority of workplace fatalities occurred to males, workplace violence disproportionately affects females. Homicides contributed to 21% of all occupational fatalities for women, compared to 9% for men. Of these homicides, relatives or domestic partners contributed to 39% of female homicide cases; male homicide cases were most likely to be perpetrated by robbers, contributing to 36% of male homicide cases.

The Occupational Safety and Health Administration ("OSHA") a department of the United States Department of Labor defines workplace violence as "any act or threat of physical violence, harassment, intimidation, or other threatening disruptive behavior that occurs at the work site. It ranges from threats and verbal abuse to physical assaults and even homicide."

2,000,000 US workers per year report workplace violence

Most cases of workplace violence are non-fatal. From 1993 to 1999, an average of about 1.7 million people reported occupational violence. About 75% of these cases are considered simple assault, while 19% of cases are considered aggravated assault.

Workplace violence is at epidemic proportions. "There used to be a time when an employee shooting someone in the workplace would be a shock. Now it's becoming common," states Kathleen M. Bonczyk, Esq. a researcher and expert on workplace violence prevention.

Following a June 2017 shooting spree when a former employee returned to his Orlando, Florida workplace to murder five co-workers before committing suicide Kathleen M. Bonczyk, Esq. stated "You hear it again and again. People always say 'We didn't think it (workplace violence) would happen here,' but it can happen anywhere and anytime. It shouldn't be a question of if; employers should operate under the question of when."

There are four categories used to classify workplace violence: worker on worker, personal relationship, customer/client, and criminal intent. Worker on worker violence occurs when two people of the same occupation are violent towards one another, either physically, verbally or emotionally. A common example of this is when one worker has some sort of authority over another, such as a supervisor position over a supervisee. Personal relationship violence at the workplace occurs when an employee's personal relationship is brought into the workplace and causes disruption for the employee, his/her co-workers, and possibly the customers of that business. Victims of personal relationship violence are typically women. Customer/client violence occurs when there is violence between a customer or client of a workplace and an employee. The violence could be performed by the customer onto the employee or vice versa. Finally, criminal intent violence in the workplace occurs when there is no relationship between the person committing the violent act and the workplace or its employees.

The four categories listed above are further classified into three levels, depending on the situation. Level one includes signs such as the person bullying others, being rude or abusive, and uncooperative. At this level, one should carefully take note of the behaviors and report them to a supervisor. The supervisor may want to meet with the potential perpetrator to discuss his/her behaviors. Level two includes the potentially violent subject stating that he feels victimized and verbalizing threats, verbalizing wanting to hurt others, frequently arguing with others, seeking revenge, and refusing to follow workplace policies. In response to this behavior one should document observed behaviors, directly contact a supervisor, ensure that one's own safety is put first, and, if needed, contact first responders. The third level of workplace violence are currently violent situations such as threatening to harm one's self or others by either physical means or using weapons, demonstration of extreme anger, or destruction of property. In case of level three violence, one should ensure the safety of themselves followed by the safety of others, stay calm, cooperate with law enforcement, and leave the situation if possible.

In the case of personal relationship violence, it is often hard to recognize levels one and two of violence because they typically occur outside of the workplace. Most personal relationship violence situations occur at level three, in which case the level three approach for handling the situation should be in place.

Perline and Goldschmidt contend that the present definitions of workplace violence are simply descriptive and not based on motivation of the perpetrator. Understanding the motivation underlying these crimes is important in developing preventative strategies. Perline & Goldschmidt define two types of workplace violence: 1) Object-focused workplace violence is violence that occurs to obtain some object, such as money, drugs, jewelry, etc., and 2) non-object-focused violence, which is emotionally based, and mostly associated with anger. Anger generally requires frustration and perceived injustice. Mitigating anger or perceived injustice will mitigate or prevent a violent episode, and people can be angry without perpetrating violence. Whether or not anger results in violence depends, in part, on the potential perpetrator's focus, and associated risk factors (see below). Eight different types of focus that can result in workplace violence have been identified. (Table 1)

Table 1. Anger-Focus Model of Non-Object-Focused Workplace Violence
| MOTIVATION | FOCUS | GOAL | ASSOC. CHARACTERISTICS |
|---|---|---|---|
| Anger | Healthy | Non-violent anger resolution | Conference; Legal redress; Work harder; Job change; etc. |
| Anger | Work-related issues | Retribution | Workplace targeted |
| Anger | Non-work related issues | Retribution; Inflict pain/suffering on others | Workplace convenient; Opportunistic; Injury &/or Signif. damage |
| Anger | Depressive issues; Self-aggrandizement; Excitement/attention | Reduce emotional pain/suffering in self | Signif. damage; Unknown victims; Random violence |
| Anger | Anxiety issues; Perceived threat | Control | Terrorism; Domination |
| Anger | Personality issues: Inadequacy | Self-enhancement | Bias crimes; Humiliation; Domination; Sex crimes |
| Anger | Personality issues: Dependency | Acceptance | Attachment; Stalking; Following; Random violence; Violence-by-proxy |
| Psychosis/ Drug states | Irrational | Irrational | Irrational |
| Accident | Unintentional | Unintentional | Carelessness; Uninformed; Neuropsych. status |
| Other | Not otherwise specified (NOS) | | |

The anger-focus model: 1) characterizes workplace violence according to the focus of the perpetrator; 2) allows for the gathering of separate statistics for object-focused crime and non-object-focused crime; and 3) shows that domestic violence, school shootings, terrorist activities, and non-object violence that occurs in the workplace are similarly motivated. Consequently, understanding the factors driving one type of non-object-focused violence should help us to develop strategies for mitigating the other types of non-object-focused violence. Thus, we can see that these crimes can be mitigated by reducing the frustration level of the potential perpetrator, reducing the level of the potential perpetrator's perceived injustice, or changing the focus the potential perpetrator to a more healthy focus.

A very large percentage of non-object-focused perpetrators are either arrested, killed by police, or killed themselves after committing their violent act. If we consider suicide-by-cop, it has been suggested that somewhere between 25–50 percent of non-object-focused workplace homicides result in suicide. Suicide is virtually unheard of following an object-focused crime, it just doesn't make sense. Non-object-focused workplace violence is purposeful, occurs in stages, and is seldom if ever a spontaneous event.

The five stages of non-object-focused violence that have been identified are:

- Anger
- Focus
- Pre-violence: fantasy, rehearsal, preparation, victim denigration and threat
- Violence: toward self, toward others, toward self & others, and toward environment
- Post-violence: resolution, and consequences.

Thirty risk factors have been identified. Fourteen of these risk factors are social & situational; twelve are psychological, and four are behavioral.

Signs of potential threats

There is little information on what certainly causes workplace violence, however it is agreed that a combination of personal factors, workplace factors, and individual interactions contribute to violence in the workplace. The Federal Bureau of Investigation (FBI) recognizes the following behaviors as warning signs for potential perpetrators of workplace violence:

- decreased productivity or inconsistent work performance
- damage or destruction of company property
- obsession with weapons
- poor workplace relationships
- obsessive involvement with the job
- repeated direct or veiled threats
- increased mood swings
- paranoid, aggressive behavior
- interest in recently publicized violent events
- unwanted romantic interest in a co-worker
- refusal to accept criticism
- overreaction to company policies

The National Safety Council also recognizes excessive use of drugs or alcohol as well as absenteeism, or change in job performance that is unexplained. Paying attention to these warning signs and reporting them may help prevent events of workplace violence.

Global View

Workplace violence does not currently have a universal definition. The International Labor Organization (ILO) conducted a study of 80 different countries. In 40 of those countries the words used for work related violence, include both physical and psychological. In 4 of those countries work related violence only includes physical conduct. In 16 countries the terms used are very vague and do not clarify if is referring to physical or psychological conduct. Due to different countries having different views, there is not a universal definition for workplace violence. The Lloyd’s Register foundation conducted a survey in 2021 to depict a global view of workplace violence. This survey was based on 125,000 interviews that was conducted in 121 countries. According to this survey, 22.8 percent of the world has experienced violence and harassment at work. The survey divided workplace violence and harassment into 3 categories: physical, psychological, and sexual. The Americas had a prevalence rate of 34.3 percent. The next highest was Africa with 25.7 percent. Third was Europe and Central Asia with 25.5 percent. In America women were more likely to face violence at work by 8.2 percent. In Europe and Central Asia women were 8 percent more likely. In Africa, men were more likely to experience workplace violence by 2.2 percent.

The first category of workplace violence that the survey covered was physical. Physical violence includes, but not limited to, hitting, pushing, and spitting. Worldwide 8.5 percent of people have experienced physical violence in the workplace. Africa registered the highest prevalence to this at 12.5 percent. Americas was number 2 at 9 percent. Asia and the Pacific had 7.9 percent. In Asia, Africa, Europe, and central Asia men were more at risk compared to women. However, in Arab states and the Americas, women were more at risk then men.

The second category of work place violence was psychological. Psychological violence would include, but not limited to, threats, intimidation, and insults. Globally 17.9 percent of people have experienced psychological violence in the workplace. The Americas had the highest prevalence when it came to psychological violence at 29.3 percent. Africa had a prevalence percentage of 20.2 percent. The lowest was the Arab states which had 11.4 percent. In Europe and Central Asia psychological violence was reported 5 percent more in woman than in men. In Arab States women were 4.3 percent more likely. On the other hand, in Africa Men reported higher rates of psychological violence by 2.3 percent.

The third and final category that the survey covered was sexual harassment. Sexual harassment would include, but not limited to, inappropriate touching, inappropriate sexual gestures, and sharing sexually inappropriate images or videos. Globally 6.2 percent of people experienced sexual harassment in the workplace. The Americas had the highest prevalence of sexual harassment at 11.8 percent. This is compared to a little more than 5 percent on average for all the other regions. In America nearly 2 in 10 women reported experiencing sexual harassment in contrast with one in ten men experiencing it. In Europe and Central Asia women were just under 7 percent more likely to experience sexual harassment. The International Labor Organization (ILO) has initiated multiple programs and regulations to help decrease the effect of workplace violence worldwide.

=== Prevention ===
The United States Department of Labor's purpose is to " promote a safe environment for our employees and the visiting public, and to work with our employees to maintain a work environment that is free from violence, harassment, intimidation, and other disruptive behavior". Hemati-Esmaeili (2018) supports," As worksites for healthcare providers and related occupations vary in purpose, size, and complexity, WVPP should be designed to specifically target the unique nature and varied needs of each organization” (par. 5) Therefore, the DOL has provided information in order to work towards their purpose of keeping the workplace safe for individuals. The information is provided in order to help the people of the workplace to be able to identify potentially harmful behaviors as well as recognize their responsibilities to prevent violent behavior. The DOL administered the Workplace violence program in order to help employees respond to and prevent workplace violence through better understanding. They have also identified seven key factors to help prevent workplace violence:

1. Work Environment- As the work environment directly and heavily influences the employees and clients, it is crucial that the environment remains positive and open. This encourages better communication and positive attitudes in the workplace.
2. Security- Additional safety measures such as security may help deter possible violent events from occurring. This could include security guards, cameras, or other technological machines such as metal detectors.
3. Education- educating employees on current policies and procures as well as on possible warning signs of workplace violence.
4. Performance / conduct indicators- ways to be aware of changes in employee behavior, such as absenteeism or change in performance.
5. Employee support services- services available for employees to express concerns
6. Early intervention- not letting symptoms go unnoticed or unresolved
7. Take appropriate actions- notify authorities when needed

It is also recommended that employers treat terminated employees with respect in order to avoid the feeling that they are being victimized. Additional precautions may be alerting security that there will be job termination that day.

==== Responses ====
According to the Department of Homeland Security in the situation of workplace violence, while staying calm, one should run, hide, or fight. It is suggested to only fight if there are no other safe options. In the event of having to handle a violent or potentially violent person, there are five steps to follow. First demonstrate concern for the employee and show that you care. Second, do not judge the person, but observe their behaviors. Third is to demonstrate empathy. Fourth is to engage in conversation with them, let them express what will help them. Finally, work with them to create a solution that will not put anyone at risk.

== Deadly examples ==
- Patrick Henry Sherrill, a 44-year-old mail carrier from Edmond, Oklahoma, was reprimanded after a heated argument with two supervisors on August 19, 1986. At approximately 7:00 the following morning, Sherrill showed up at the post office in his uniform. Over the course of the next 15 minutes, Sherrill went on a murderous rampage, gunning down any employee who crossed his path. After sealing off the exits, Sherrill ended up murdering fourteen coworkers and wounding six others. When police arrived at the post office, Sherrill turned the gun on himself.
- On November 5, 2009, Nidal Hasan, who was serving in the United States Army as a psychiatrist, fatally shot 13 people and injured more than 30 others at Fort Hood (now Fort Cavazos) near Killeen, Texas. The shooting produced more casualties than any other on an American military base. The United States Department of Defense and federal law enforcement agencies have classified the shootings as an act of workplace violence. In 2013, Lt. Gen. Dana K. Chipman described the attack as "the alleged criminal act of a single individual" rather than terrorism. In February 2015, the Army "determined that there was sufficient evidence to conclude Hasan "was in communication with [a] foreign terrorist organization before the attack," and that his radicalization and subsequent acts could reasonably be considered to have been "inspired or motivated by the foreign terrorist organization."
- David Burke was employed by USAir as a ticket agent until his supervisor, Raymond Thompson, fired him for theft. After Thompson refused to reinstate him, Burke arrived at Los Angeles International Airport on December 7, 1987, and purchased a ticket for Pacific Southwest Airlines Flight 1771 to San Francisco International Airport. Burke smuggled a .44 Magnum onto the aircraft. Shortly after takeoff, the aircraft's cockpit voice recorder picked up the sound of gunshots. Then came the sound of David Burke's voice. The pilots were shot and the aircraft crashed into a hillside in San Luis Obispo County, killing all 43 people on board, including Burke and Thompson. At the crash site, an airsickness bag was found containing a message which Burke had written for his former supervisor. It read: "I asked for some leniency for my family, remember. Well, I got none. And you'll get none."
- At 6:45 a.m. on August 26, 2015, 41-year-old Vester Lee Flanagan, a disgruntled ex-reporter for Roanoke station WDBJ-TV, shot and killed two former colleagues live on television in Moneta, Virginia. At the time, 24-year-old WDBJ reporter Alison Parker was conducting an interview of local chamber of commerce executive Vicki Gardener as 27-year-old videographer Adam Ward filmed the interview on a live feed. Flanagan, who had been previously terminated from his position at WDBJ, captured the three via a body cam and appeared to wait until the piece was airing before he began shooting and emptied his Glock handgun of all bullets. Gardener who was also shot survived the attack. After the shootings, Flanagan fled the scene and later boasted about the attack on social media before committing suicide.
- On December 2, 2015, county health inspector Syed Farook and his wife, Tashfeen Malik, burst into a banquet room in San Bernardino, California where approximately 80 of Farook's co-workers were gathered to attend a holiday party as well as a company training session. Farook and Malik, who were dressed in military-style attire and armed with rifles, killed 14 people and injured 22 others. The couple also attempted to bomb the facility. Later, they were killed in a shoot-out with police.
- On February 26, 2016, 38-year old Cedric Ford who was employed as a painter at Excel Industries in Hesston, Kansas shot and killed three people and injured 14 other people. A co-worker reported that approximately two hours after the two men had clocked in for their shift at work that day, he saw Ford strapped up with his weapon and shooting at people in the factory's parking lot.
- On March 20, 2016, a 54-year-old retired state trooper with the Pennsylvania Turnpike system named Clarence Briggs of Newville, Pennsylvania returned to the roads he used to patrol prior to his retirement and attempted an armed robbery at a toll booth. Briggs shot and killed toll booth worker Danny Crouse, 55, and Ron Heist, 71, a security guard before he was shot and killed by the authorities.
- On April 8, 2016, workplace violence erupted at Lackland Airforce Base in San Antonio, Texas. At that time, the squadron's commanding officer, Lieutenant Colonel William Allen "Bill" Schroeder, 39, was shot and killed by Staff Sergeant Steven Douglas Bellino, 41, who then killed himself. Thereafter, the facility went into lockdown mode. Soon after the shootings, it was reported that the incident was not a case involving terrorism but was workplace violence. Bellino was being escorted to a disciplinary hearing when he committed the murder-suicide.
- On May 4, 2016, a man who had been involuntarily terminated two weeks earlier from his position at Knight Transportation in Katy, Texas approximately 20 miles west of Houston returned to his former workplace armed with a shotgun and a pistol. Marion Guy Williams, 68, was reported to have said words to the effect of "You all ruined my life." Williams then shot and killed supervisor Michael William "Mike" Dawid, 35, injured two other employees and then killed himself.
- On July 7, 2025, a 15-year-old landscaper opened fire with a handgun on his four other co-workers during a lunch break, killing two and injuring another. The fourth co-worker escaped unharmed. The teen was then found nearby and arrested by police while suffering a medical episode.

== Aggression ==
Dr. Arnold H. Buss, of the University of Texas at Austin (1961), identified eight types of workplace aggression:

- Verbal-passive-indirect (failure to deny false rumors about target, failure to provide information needed by target)
- Verbal-passive-direct ("silent treatment", failure to return communication, i.e. phone calls, e-mails)
- Verbal-active-indirect (spreading false rumors, belittling ideas or work)
- Verbal-active-direct (insulting, acting condescendingly, yelling)
- Physical-passive-indirect (causing others to create a delay for the target)
- Physical-passive-direct (reducing target's ability to contribute, e.g. scheduling them to present at the end of the day where fewer people will be attending)
- Physical-active-indirect (theft, destruction of property, unnecessary consumption of resources needed by the target)
- Physical-active-direct (physical attack, nonverbal, vulgar gestures directed at the target)

In a study performed by Baron and Neuman, researchers found pay cuts and pay freezes, use of part-time employees, change in management, increased diversity, computer monitoring of employee performance, reengineering, and budget cuts were all significantly linked to increased workplace aggression. The study also showed a substantial amount of evidence linking unpleasant physical conditions (high temperature, poor lighting) and high negative affect, which facilitates workplace aggression. Individuals who resort to mass shootings at work often threaten to kill before any actual violence takes place.

=== Risk assessments ===
In the United Kingdom there is a legal obligation to complete risk assessments for both physical and psychosocial workplace hazards. Other countries have similar occupational health and safety legislation in place relating to identifying and either eliminating or controlling for hazards in the workplace. Workplace violence is considered to be a significant hazard in its own right. Regulation 3 of the Management of Health and Safety at Work Regulations 1999 states that, "every employer shall make a suitable and sufficient assessment of:

- The risks to the health and safety of his (or her) employees to which they are exposed whilst they are at work; and
- The risks to the health and safety of persons not in his employment arising out of or in connection with the conduct of him or his undertaking".

== Occupational groups at higher risk ==
The Canadian Centre for Occupational Health and Safety lists the following higher risk occupations.

- Healthcare workers
- Correctional officers
- Social Services workers
- Teachers
- Municipal housing inspectors
- Public Works Employees
- Retail Workers
- Police Officers

Health care workers are at high risk for experiencing violence in the workplace. Examples of violence include threats, physical assaults, and muggings. According to estimates of the Bureau of Labor Statistics (BLS), the rate of nonfatal occupational injuries and illnesses involving days away from work was 15.1 per 10,000 full-time workers in 2012. This rate is much higher than the rate for total private industries, which is 4.0 per 10,000 full-time workers.

There are many contributing factors that can lead to health-care workers, specifically nurses, experiencing workplace violence. These factors can be divided into environmental, organizational, and individual psychosocial. A few environmental factors may include the specific setting, long waiting times, frequent interruptions, uncertainty regarding the patients' treatment, and heavy workloads. Organizational factors may include inefficient teamwork, organizational injustice, lack of aggression management programs, and distrust between colleagues. One study reported that workplace violence was most frequently associated with outpatient and imaging settings, daytime work hours, and interactions with patients’ relatives as primary contributing factors.This may also include inadequate security procedures. Individual psychosocial factors may include nurses being young and inexperienced, previous experiences with violence, and a lack of communication skills and/or awareness of how to interpret aggressive situations. Misunderstandings may also occur due to the communication barrier between nurses and patients. A few examples of this are a lack of privacy for the patient, background noise, and the patient's condition being affected by medication, pain, and/or anxiety.

== See also ==
- Abusive supervision
- Going postal
- Occupational health psychology
- Occupational safety and health
- Organizational conflict
- Workplace aggression
- Workplace bullying
