= Physical abuse =

Physical injury and mistreatment of others

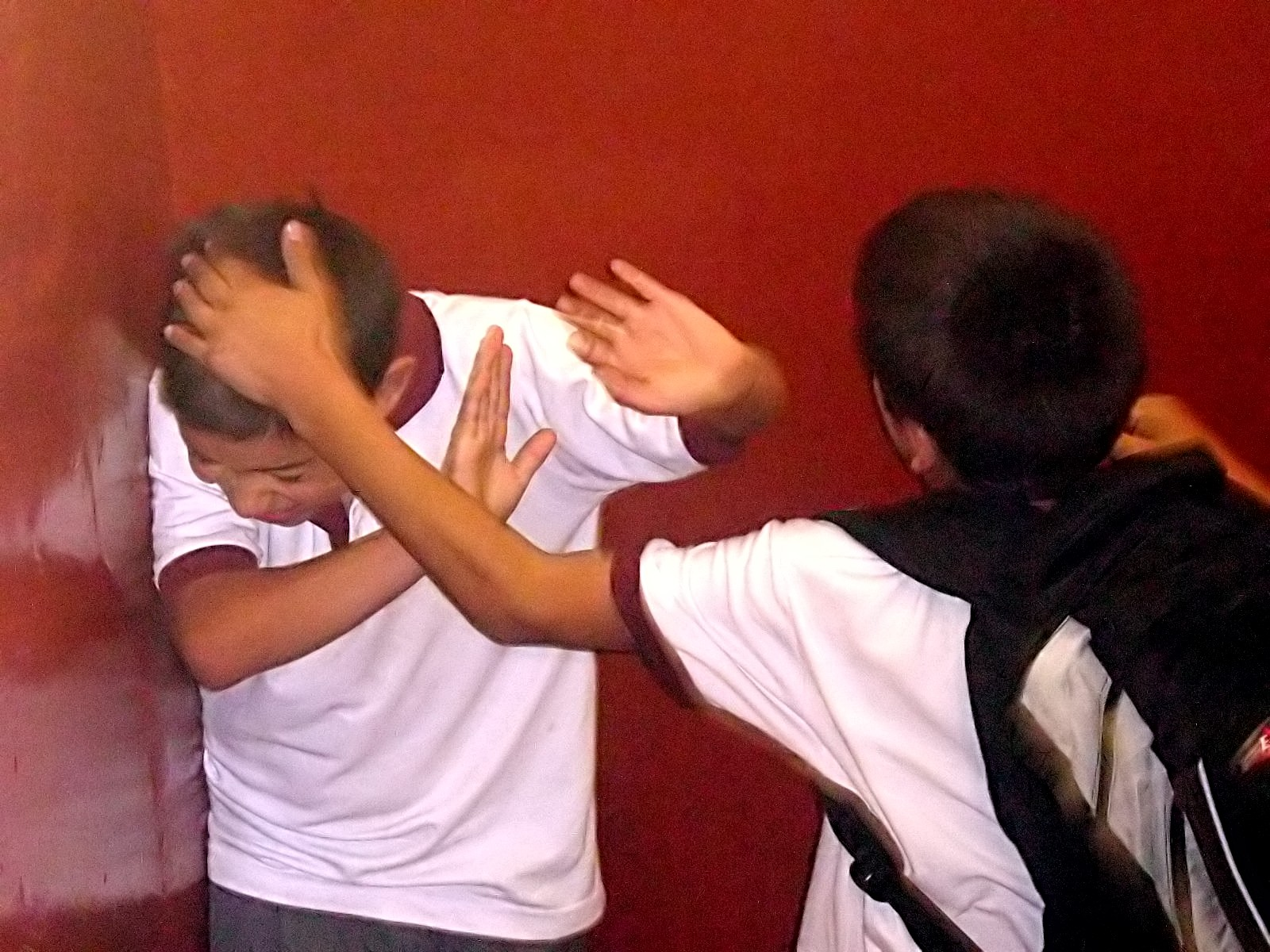
- Boy violently slapping another boy's head
- Specialty: Emergency medicine
- Differential diagnosis: Accidental injury Self-injury

Physical abuse is any intentional act causing injury or trauma to another person or animal by way of bodily contact. Both children and adults can be victims of physical abuse, as in cases of domestic violence or workplace aggression. Alternative terms sometimes used include physical assault or physical violence, and may also include sexual abuse. Physical abuse may involve more than one abuser, and more than one victim.

== Forms ==
Physical abuse means any non-accidental act or behavior causing injury, trauma, or other physical suffering or bodily harm. Abusive acts toward children can often result from parents' attempts at child discipline through excessive corporal punishment.

== Causes ==
A number of causes of physical abuse against children have been identified, the most common of which, according to Mash and Wolfe, being:

- many abusive and neglectful parents have had little exposure to positive parental models and supports.
- there is often a greater degree of stress in the family environment.
- information-processing disturbances may cause maltreating parents to misperceive or mislabel their child's behavior, which leads to inappropriate responses.
- there is often a lack of awareness or understanding the appropriate expected mental growth or development.

== Effects ==
Physically abused children are at risk for later interpersonal problems involving aggressive behavior, and adolescents are at a much greater risk for substance use disorders. In addition, symptoms of depression, emotional distress, and suicidal ideation are also common features of people who have been physically abused. Studies have also shown that children with a history of physical abuse may meet DSM-IV-TR criteria for post traumatic stress disorder (PTSD). As many as one-third of children who experience physical abuse are also at risk to become abusive as adults.

Researchers have pointed to other potential psycho-biological effects of child physical abuse on parenting, when abused children become adults. These recent findings may, at least in part, be carried forward by epigenetic changes that impact the regulation of stress physiology.

== Treatment ==
Evidence-based interventions for physical abuse include cognitive behavioral therapy (CBT) as well as video-feedback interventions and child-parent psychodynamic psychotherapy; all of which specifically target anger patterns and distorted beliefs, and offer training and/or reflection, support, and modelling that focuses on parenting skills and expectations, as well as increasing empathy for the child by supporting the parent's taking the child's perspective.

These forms of treatment may include training in social competence and management of daily demands in an effort to decrease parental stress, which is a known risk factor for physical abuse. Although these treatment and prevention strategies are to help children and parents of children who have been abused, some of these methods can also be applied to adults who have physically abused.

== Other animals ==
Physical abuse has also been observed among Adélie penguins in Antarctica.

== Forms ==
- Assault
- Battered person syndrome
- Child abuse
- Domestic violence
- Enhanced interrogation techniques
- Hazing
- Negligence
- Psychological abuse
- Torture
- Violence
