= Santa Barbara Police Department =

Police force in California, US

- Badge of the Santa Barbara Police Department since 1990
- Abbreviation: SBPD
- Motto: "Dedicated to Service"

Agency overview
- Formed: 1899

Jurisdictional structure
- Operations jurisdiction: Santa Barbara, California, United States
- Area: 41.4 sq mi (107 km^{2})
- Population: 90,000
- Legal jurisdiction: City of Santa Barbara, California
- Governing body: Santa Barbara City Council
- General nature: Local civilian police

Operational structure
- Headquarters: 215 E Figueroa St; Santa Barbara, California
- Agency executive: Barney Melekian, Chief of Police (Interim)

Website
- http://www.santabarbaraca.gov/Government/Departments/Police/

The Santa Barbara Police Department is a local law enforcement agency in the city of Santa Barbara, California. It was founded in January 1900 by the mayor at the time, Charles A. Storke. The department's jurisdiction is a little over 40 sq mi (100 km^{2}) and has a population of around 90,000.

The motto of "Dedicated to Serve" was initiated in the early 70's by Chief Alfred Trembly via an employee contest. Chief Trembly was a former commander with the Los Angeles Police Department and upon becoming chief of the Santa Barbara Police Department wanted to create a motto similar to the Los Angeles Police Department's "Protect and Serve". The winning "Dedicated to Serve" was submitted by Ofc. Quinton Brown (later lieutenant).

The department's current shoulder patch was designed and approved for wear on April 1, 1984, by Ofc. Mark Grunewald. Ofc. Grunewald also designed the current badge which was adopted by the department in August 1990.

== Organizational structure ==
- Chief Support Staff Chief, Diversity Officer, Internal Affairs, Public Information Officer, Secretary
- Support Services Business Office, Parking, Station Officer
- Community Services Commander, Asst. Commander, Secretary, Beat Coordinators, Cadets, Community Relations, Crime Analysis, DARE, Information Technology, Property and Evidence, Police Activities League, Records, Training/Recruitment
- Investigative Commander, Asst. Commander, Secretaries, Burglary, Crimes Against Persons, Forensic Science, Narcotics/Vice, Police Technician, Polygraph, Special Investigations, Warrants
- Patrol Commander, Asst. Commander, Secretary, Admin. Sgt./Field Training Officer, Communications Center (911), Parking Enforcement, Special Enforcement Team, Night Life Enforcement Team, Tactical Patrol Force, Tactical Planning / Special Events, Traffic, Watch Commanders, Watch Supervisors, K-9, Drinking Driver Team, Crisis Response Unit, S.W.A.T., Reserves

== Work environment ==
Santa Barbara is a city in Santa Barbara County, California, United States. Situated on an east–west trending section of coastline, the longest such section on the West Coast of the United States, the city lies between the steeply-rising Santa Ynez Mountains and the sea. Santa Barbara's climate is often described as Mediterranean, and the city is sometimes referred to as the "American Riviera."

== In popular culture ==
The Santa Barbara Police Department is where many of the episodes of the television show Psych take place.
