= Mobbing =

Bullying of an individual by a group

Mobbing, as a sociological term, refers either to bullying in any context, or specifically to that within the workplace, especially when perpetrated by a group rather than an individual.

== Psychological and health effects ==
Victims of workplace mobbing frequently suffer from: adjustment disorders, somatic symptoms, psychological trauma (e.g., trauma tremors or sudden onset selective mutism), post-traumatic stress disorder (PTSD), or major depression.

In mobbing targets with PTSD, Leymann notes that the "mental effects were fully comparable with PTSD from war or prison camp experiences." Some patients may develop alcoholism or other substance abuse disorders. Family relationships routinely suffer and victims sometimes display acts of aggression towards strangers in the street. Workplace targets and witnesses may even develop brief psychotic episodes, generally with paranoid symptoms. Leymann estimated that 15% of suicides in Sweden could be directly attributed to workplace mobbing.

== Development of the concept ==
Konrad Lorenz, in his book entitled On Aggression (1966), first described mobbing among birds and other animals, attributing it to instincts rooted in the Darwinian struggle to thrive (see animal mobbing behavior). In his view, most humans are subject to similar innate impulses but capable of bringing them under rational control. Lorenz's explanation for his choice of the English word "mobbing" was omitted in the English translation by Marjorie Kerr Wilson. According to Kenneth Westhues, Lorenz chose the word "mobbing" because he remembered in the collective attack by birds, the old German term hassen auf, which means "to hate after" or "to put a hate on" was applied and this emphasised "the depth of antipathy with which the attack is made" rather than the English word 'mobbing' which emphasised the collective aspect of the attack.

In the 1970s, the Swedish physician Peter-Paul Heinemann applied Lorenz's conceptualization to the collective aggression of children against a targeted child. In the 1980s, professor and practising psychologist Heinz Leymann applied the term to ganging up in the workplace. In 2011, anthropologist Janice Harper suggested that some anti-bullying approaches effectively constitute a form of mobbing by using the label "bully" to dehumanize, encouraging people to shun and avoid people labeled bullies, and in some cases sabotage their work or refuse to work with them, while almost always calling for their exclusion and termination from employment.

== Cause ==
Janice Harper followed her Huffington Post essay with a series of essays in both The Huffington Post and in her column "Beyond Bullying: Peacebuilding at Work, School and Home" in Psychology Today that argued that mobbing is a form of group aggression innate to primates, and that those who engage in mobbing are not necessarily "evil" or "psychopathic", but responding in a predictable and patterned manner when someone in a position of leadership or influence communicates to the group that someone must go. For that reason, she indicated that anyone can and will engage in mobbing, and that once mobbing gets underway, just as in the animal kingdom it will almost always continue and intensify as long as the target remains with the group. She subsequently published a book on the topic in which she explored animal behavior, organizational cultures and historical forms of group aggression, suggesting that mobbing is a form of group aggression on a continuum of structural violence with genocide as the most extreme form of mob aggression. Stephen James Minton, a psychologist who wrote a book on the topic agreed and stated "...we must be aware of the systemic and power factors that permit it."

== Online ==
Social networking sites and blogs have enabled anonymous groups to coordinate and attack other people. The victims of these groups can be targeted by various attacks and threats, sometimes causing the victims to use pseudonyms or go offline to avoid them.

Herd mentality and cyberbullying are common on social media platforms. The "social media mob" that formed may evolve to "bullying anyone who didn't align with their beliefs or conclusions".

== In the workplace ==
British anti-bullying researchers Andrea Adams and Tim Field have used the expression "workplace bullying" instead of what Leymann called "mobbing" in a workplace context. They identify mobbing as a particular type of bullying that is not as apparent as most, defining it as "an emotional assault. It begins when an individual becomes the target of disrespectful and harmful behavior. Through innuendo, rumors, and public discrediting, a hostile environment is created in which one individual gathers others to willingly, or unwillingly, participate in continuous malevolent actions to force a person out of the workplace."

Adams and Field believe that mobbing is typically found in work environments that have poorly organised production or working methods and incapable or inattentive management and that mobbing victims are usually "exceptional individuals who demonstrated intelligence, competence, creativity, integrity, accomplishment and dedication".

In contrast, Janice Harper suggests that workplace mobbing is typically found in organizations where there is limited opportunity for employees to exit, whether through tenure systems or contracts that make it difficult to terminate an employee (such as universities or unionized organizations), and/or where finding comparable work in the same community makes it difficult for the employee to voluntarily leave (such as academic positions, religious institutions, or military). In these employments, efforts to eliminate the worker will intensify to push the worker out against his or her will through shunning, sabotage, false accusations and a series of investigations and poor reviews. Another form of employment where workers are mobbed are those that require the use of uniforms or other markers of group inclusion (law enforcement, fire fighting, military), organizations where a single gender has predominated, but another gender is beginning to enter (STEM fields, fire fighting, military, nursing, teaching, and construction). Finally, she suggests that organizations where there are limited opportunities for advancement can be prone to mobbing because those who do advance are more likely to view challenges to their leadership as threats to their precarious positions. Harper further challenges the idea that workers are targeted for their exceptional competence. In some cases, she suggests, exceptional workers are mobbed because they are viewed as threatening to someone, but some workers who are mobbed are not necessarily good workers. Rather, Harper contends, some mobbing targets are outcasts or unproductive workers who cannot easily be terminated, and are thus treated inhumanely to push them out. While Harper emphasizes the cruelty and damaging consequences of mobbing, her organizational analysis focuses on the structural, rather than moral, nature of the organization. Moreover, she views the behavior itself, which she terms workplace aggression, as grounded in group psychology, rather than individual psychosis—even when the mobbing is initiated due to a leader's personal psychosis, the dynamics of group aggression will transform the leader's bullying into group mobbing—two vastly distinct psychological and social phenomena.

Shallcross, Ramsay and Barker consider workplace "mobbing" to be a generally unfamiliar term in some English speaking countries. Some researchers claim that mobbing is simply another name for bullying. Workplace mobbing can be considered as a "virus" or a "cancer" that spreads throughout the workplace via gossip, rumour and unfounded accusations. It is a deliberate attempt to force a person out of their workplace by humiliation, general harassment, emotional abuse and/or terror. Mobbing can be described as being "ganged up on." Mobbing is executed by a leader (who can be a manager, a co-worker, or a subordinate). The leader then rallies others into a systematic and frequent "mob-like" behaviour toward the victim.

Mobbing as "downward bullying" by superiors is also known as "bossing", and "upward bullying" by colleagues as "staffing", in some European countries, for instance, in German-speaking regions.

== At school ==
Following on from the work of Heinemann, Elliot identifies mobbing as a common phenomenon in the form of group bullying at school. It involves "ganging up" on someone using tactics of rumor, innuendo, discrediting, isolating, intimidating, and above all, making it look as if the targeted person is responsible (victim blaming). It is to be distinguished from normal conflicts (between pupils of similar standing and power), which are an integral part of everyday school life.

== In academia ==
Kenneth Westhues' study of mobbing in academia found that vulnerability was increased by personal differences such as being a foreigner or of a different sex; by working in fields such as music or literature which have recently come under the sway of less objective and more post-modern scholarship; financial pressure; or having an aggressive superior. Other factors included envy, heresy and campus politics.

== Checklists ==
Sociologists and authors have created checklists and other tools to identify mobbing behaviour. Common approaches to assessing mobbing behavior is through quantifying frequency of mobbing behavior based on a given definition of the behavior or through quantifying what respondents believe encompasses mobbing behavior. These are referred to as "self-labeling" and "behavior experience" methods respectively.

Limitations of some mobbing examination tools are:

- Participant exhaustion due to examination length
- Limited sample exposure resulting in limited result generalizability
- Confounding with constructs that result in the same affect as mobbing but are not purposely harmful

Common Tools used to measure mobbing behavior are:

- Leyman Inventory of Psychological Terror (LIPT)
- Negative Acts Questionnaire – Revised (NAQ-R)
- Luxembourg Workplace Mobbing Scale (LWMS)

== Counteracting ==
From an organizational perspective, it has been suggested that mobbing behavior can be curtailed by acknowledging behaviors as mobbing behaviors and that such behaviors result in harm and/or negative consequences. Precise definitions of such traits are critical due to ambiguity of unacceptable and acceptable behaviors potentially leading to unintentional mobbing behavior. Attenuation of mobbing behavior can further be enhanced by developing policies that explicitly address specific behaviors that are culturally accepted to result in harm or negative affect. This provides a framework from which mobbing victims can respond to mobbing. Lack of such a framework may result in a situation where each instance of mobbing is treated on an individual basis with no recourse of prevention. It may also indicate that such behaviors are warranted and within the realm of acceptable behavior within an organization. Direct responses to grievances related to mobbing that are handled outside of a courtroom and training programs outlining antibully-countermeasures also demonstrate a reduction in mobbing behavior.

== Persecutory delusions ==
Gang stalking or group-stalking is a set of persecutory delusions in which those affected believe they are being followed, stalked, and harassed by a large number of people. The term is associated with the virtual community formed by people who consider themselves "targeted individuals" ("T.I."), claiming their lives are disrupted from being stalked by organized groups intent on causing them harm.

== See also ==
- Cyberbullying
- Group narcissism
- Industrial and organizational psychology
- Lynch mob
- Ochlocracy
- Occupational health psychology
- Real estate mobbing
- Relational aggression
- Scapegoating
- Swatting
- Stalking
- Victim blaming
- Victimisation
