= Kenneth Westhues =

Canadian sociologist

- Education: Vanderbilt University
- Occupation: Sociologist
- Employer: University of Waterloo
- Known for: Research on workplace bullying in academia

Kenneth Westhues is a Canadian sociologist. He is a professor emeritus of Sociology at the University of Waterloo, where he was the chair of the department from 1975 to 1978. He is the author or editor of several books about workplace bullying in academia.

== Early life ==
Westhues earned a PhD in sociology from Vanderbilt University in 1970.

== Career ==
Westhues was a professor of sociology at the University of Guelph in 1971. He subsequently joined the Sociology department at the University of Waterloo, where he was the department chair from 1975 to 1978.

Westhues initially published research about the relationship between church and state. He subsequently published research about the hippie movement. Westhues authored and edited several books about workplace bullying in academia. His research found that vulnerability was increased by personal differences such as being a foreigner or of a different sex; by working in a post-modern field such as music or literature; financial pressure; or having an aggressive superior. Other factors included envy, heresy and campus politics.

== Selected works ==
- Westhues, Kenneth (1991). Eliminating Professors: A Guide to the Dismissal Process. Lewiston, New York: Edwin Mellen Press. ISBN 9780773482104. OCLC 85947740.
- Westhues, Kenneth, ed. (2004). Workplace Mobbing in Academe: Reports from Twenty Universities. Lewiston, New York: Edwin Mellen Press. ISBN 9780773459779. OCLC 492833127.
- Westhues, Kenneth (2005). The Envy of Excellence: Administrative Mobbing of High-Achieving Professors. Lewiston, New York: Edwin Mellen Press. ISBN 9780773459793. OCLC 68113388.
- Westhues, Kenneth, ed. (2008). The Anatomy of an Academic Mobbing: Two Cases. Lewiston, New York: Edwin Mellen Press. ISBN 9780773449220. OCLC 242561191.
