= C. K. Gunsalus =

Researcher

- Other name: Tina
- Education: University of Illinois College of Law (1984); University of Illinois at Urbana–Champaign (1978)
- Occupations: Director of the National Center for Principled Leadership and Research Ethics (NCPRE) at the University of Illinois Urbana-Champaign; Research Professor in the Coordinated Science Laboratory; Professor Emerita in the Gies College of Business
- Known for: Expert, speaker, author and workshop presenter in the areas of conflict resolution, communication, research and organizational ethics, leadership, negotiation and professionalism

C. K. Gunsalus is the Director of the National Center for Principled Leadership and Research Ethics (NCPRE) at the University of Illinois Urbana-Champaign, in addition to being a Research Professor in the Coordinated Science Laboratory and Professor Emerita in the Gies College of Business.

== Education ==
Gunsalus graduated magna cum laude from the University of Illinois College of Law in 1984, after receiving her AB with distinction in History from the University of Illinois at Urbana-Champaign in 1978. She is licensed to practice law in the state of Illinois.

== Current research ==
Gunsalus is a speaker, author, and workshop presenter on matters of research integrity, leadership, ethics and professionalism in academia. Her writing and speaking has been characterized as "lucid, practical and remarkably shrewd," and she presents "an extremely useful and comprehensive set of tools and skills" in the area of academic ethics "in a conversational tone, with a good sense of humor."

She co-leads a study funded by the United States Office of Research Integrity to investigate and address the effects of detrimental research practices, was the principal investigator for a $6 million project with the Howard Hughes Medical Institute on leadership development tailored to the research setting, Labs That Work: For Everyone, co-principal investigator on the AGU Ethics and Equity Initiative: Catalyzing Cultural Change in the Sciences, a three-year grant awarded by the Alfred P. Sloan Foundation, and the principal investigator for an ongoing $3.8 million project co-creating an Leadership Academy with Nanyang Technological University in Singapore. She was the principal investigator for NCPRE's centerpiece project, Ethics CORE, a national online ethics resource initiated with $1.5 million from the National Science Foundation.

Gunsalus has collaborated with Carol Thrush, Brian Martinson and other authorities to develop implementations of the SOURCE, the only validated instrument for evaluating research climate in organizations. and the CARES, the only instrument validated in research settings for assessing interpersonal climates. The growing dataset permits participants to compare their own environments to others both inside and outside their own institutions. Findings from use of the SOURCE informed an April 2015 Nature article on the effects of research climate on desirable and undesirable research behaviors. She has collaborated with Dena Plemmons of the University of California, Riverside on a replication study on the use of Deliberative Lab Conversations for promoting research ethics in daily lab life.

Her areas of professional interest include research and organizational integrity, leadership, professionalism, negotiation, conflict resolution and communication.

== Career ==
During her tenure at Illinois, Gunsalus has held appointments and taught courses in the Colleges of Law, Medicine, Business and Engineering, and served as assistant and associate vice chancellor for research from 1984 to 1994, associate provost from 1994 to 2002, associate dean of the College of Liberal Arts and Sciences from 2002 to 2010, as well as acting as special counsel in the Office of University Counsel and as the campus research standards (integrity) officer. She started her career at the Computer-based Education Research Laboratory, which developed the PLATO project.

== Memberships and honors ==
Gunsalus was (2017) a member of the National Academy of Sciences Committee on Responsible Science. She chaired the American Association for the Advancement of Science (AAAS) Committee on Scientific Freedom and Responsibility and, later, the AAAS Scientific Freedom and Responsibility Award committee. She has served on the AAAS Council of Delegates, the Illinois Supreme Court Commission on Professionalism, and the United States Commission on Research Integrity. In 2013, she was selected as one of 15 finalists (out of 222 nominations) for the Economist Intelligence Unit's Best Business Professor of the Year Award. She is an elected fellow of the American Association for the Advancement of Science in recognition of her "sustained contributions to the national debate over improving the practical handling of ethical, legal, professional and administrative issues as they affect scientific research."

== Selected publications ==
- Gunsalus, C. K. The College Administrator's Survival Guide Revised Edition. Cambridge, Mass: Harvard University Press, 2021. ISBN 9780674258549
- Andrew Grey, Mark J. Bolland, Alison Avenell, Andrew A. Klein, and C. K. Gunsalus, Comment: Check for publication integrity before misconduct, Nature, January 2020.]
- Gunsalus, C. K. World View: Make reports of research misconduct public, Nature, June 2019.
- Gunsalus, C. K., Marcia K. McNutt, Brian C. Martinson, Larry R. Faulkner, and Robert M. Nerem, Comment: Overdue: a US advisory board for research integrity, Nature, February 2019.
- Gunsalus, C. K. and Aaron D. Robinson, Comment: Nine pitfalls of research misconduct, Nature, May 2018.
- Baggerly, Keith and C. K. Gunsalus, Guest Editorial: Penalty too light. The Cancer Letter, vol. 41, no. 42, November 13, 2015.
- Gunsalus, C. K. (interviewed by Paul Goldberg), Gunsalus: Duke's 4.5 years is at the extreme end of the spectrum for a misconduct probe. The Cancer Letter, vol. 41, no. 18, May 8, 2015
- Gunsalus, C. K. Misconduct expert dissects Duke scandal. The Cancer Letter, vol. 41, no. O3, January 23, 2015.
- Gunsalus, C. K. The Young Professional's Survival Guide: From Cab Fares to Moral Snares. Cambridge, Mass: Harvard University Press, 2012 ISBN 9780674049444
- Gunsalus, C. K. et al., The Illinois White Paper - Improving the System for Protecting Human Subjects: Counteracting IRB Mission Creep. Qualitative Inquiry 13.5 (2007): 617–649.
- Gunsalus, C. K. et al., Mission creep in the IRB world, Science, vol. 312, no. 5779, June 9, 2006.
- Gunsalus, C. K. The College Administrator's Survival Guide. Cambridge, Mass: Harvard University Press, 2006. ISBN 9780674023154
- Gunsalus, C. K. BOOK REVIEW: The Baltimore Case: A trial of politics, science, and character, The New England Journal of Medicine, vol. 340, no. 3, January 21, 1999.
- Gunsalus, C. K. "How to blow the whistle and still have a career afterwards." based on material from Science and Engineering Ethics, vol. 4, no. 1, 1998, pp. 51–64. PDF
- Gunsalus, C. K. Preventing the need for whistleblowing: Practical advice for university administrators. Science and Engineering Ethics, vol. 4, no. 1, 1998, pp. 75–94.
- Rennie, Drummond, and C. Kristina Gunsalus. Scientific misconduct: New definition, procedures, and office—Perhaps a new leaf. JAMA vol. 269, no. 7, 1993, pp. 915–917.
