= Workplace aggression =

Type of aggression

Workplace aggression is a specific type of aggression which occurs in the workplace. Workplace aggression is any type of hostile behavior that occurs in the workplace. It can range from verbal insults and threats to physical violence, and it can occur between coworkers, supervisors, and subordinates. Common examples of workplace aggression include gossiping, bullying, intimidation, sabotage, sexual harassment, and physical violence. These behaviors can have serious consequences, including reduced productivity, increased stress, and decreased morale.

Workplace aggression can be classified as either active or passive. Active aggression is direct, overt, and obvious. It involves behaviors such as yelling, swearing, threatening, or physically attacking someone. Passive aggression is indirect, covert, and subtle. It includes behaviors such as spreading rumors, gossiping, ignoring someone, or refusing to cooperate. There are various causes of workplace aggression. These include stress, power imbalances, a lack of communication, and personality conflicts. It is important to identify and address the underlying causes of workplace aggression in order to prevent it from happening again.

Employers should take steps to create a safe and respectful work environment. This includes establishing clear policies and procedures for handling workplace aggression. Employers should also provide training on interpersonal skills and conflict resolution, as well as encourage open communication. If workplace aggression does occur, employers should take appropriate disciplinary action. Workplace aggression can decrease a person's ability to do their job well, lead to physical declines in health and mental health problems, and also change the way a person behaves at home and in public. If someone is experiencing aggression at work, it may result in an increase in missed days (absence from work) and some may decide to leave their positions.

== Definition ==
Aggression, in general, is any behavior an individual carries out with the intent to harm another person or group of people. The aggressor must believe that their behavior is harmful to their target, and that the target is motivated to avoid this behavior. International Labour Organization definition of workplace violence as "any action, incident or behaviour that departures from reasonable conduct in which a person is threatened, harmed, injured in the course of, or as a direct result of, his or her work".

A defining feature of aggression is the intent or motivation to harm. For a behavior to be considered an aggressive act, the individual committing the behavior must intend harm. In other words, if they inflict harm on another without that specific intent, it is not considered aggression.

Aggression can occur in a variety of situations. One important domain to understand aggression is in the workplace. Workplace aggression is considered a specific type of counterproductive work behavior (CWB) and is defined as "any act of aggression, physical assault, threatening or coercive behavior that causes physical or emotional harm in a work setting."

Some researchers specify that workplace aggression only includes efforts to harm coworkers, former coworkers, current employers, or past employers. Others include in workplace aggression any behaviors intended to harm another person that are enacted in a workplace.

== Classification ==
To delineate the range of behaviors that can be considered aggressive workplace behaviors, researchers have developed schemes of classification for workplace aggression. Neuman and Baron (1998) offer these three dimensions that encompass the range of workplace aggression:

1. Expressions of hostility – behaviors that are primarily verbal or symbolic in nature
2. Obstructionism – behaviors intended to hinder an employee from performing their job or the organization from accomplishing its objectives
3. Overt aggression – violent acts

In an attempt to further break down the wide range of aggressive workplace behaviors, Baron and Neuman (1996) also classify workplace aggression based on these three dichotomies:

1. Verbal–physical
2. Direct–indirect
3. Active–passive

Aggressive acts can take any possible combination of these three dichotomies. For example, failing to deny false rumors about a coworker would be classified as verbal–passive–indirect. Purposely avoiding the presence of a coworker you know is searching for your assistance could be considered physical–passive–direct.

Other researchers offer a classification system based on the aggressor's relationship to the victim.

1. Criminal intent (Type I) – this type of aggression occurs when the aggressor has no relationship to the victim or organization.
2. Customer/client (Type II) – the aggressor has a relationship with the organization and aggresses while they are being served as a customer.
3. Worker on worker (Type III) – both the aggressor and the victim are employees in the same organization. Often, the aggressor is a supervisor, and the victim is a subordinate.
4. Personal relationship (Type IV) – the aggressor has a relationship with an employee at an organization, but not the organization itself. This category includes victims who are assaulted by a domestic partner while at work.

== Covert nature ==
In the workplace much of the aggressive behavior enacted on targets are considered covert in nature. According to Bjorkqvist, Osterman, and Hjelt-Back, covert behaviors are those behaviors that are designed to disguise the aggressive behavior or aggressive intentions from the target. Overt aggression, on the other hand, includes behaviors that do not hide the aggressive intent and are open in their intentions. Typically, covert aggression is verbal, indirect, and passive in nature, while overt aggression reflects the physical, direct, and active side of the dichotomies.

Workplace aggression often takes the form of covert behaviors. This can be attributed to what Bjorkqvist, Osterman, and Lagerspetz call the effect/danger ratio. This term refers to the aggressors' subjective evaluation of the relative effects and danger of committing an aggressive act. For an aggressor, it is ideal to have a larger effect/danger ratio. In other words, aggressors want an act to have a large effect with relatively low risk of danger to themselves.

Individuals in the workplace are subjected to prolonged exposure to each other. This prolonged exposure means the victims of the aggressors' actions likely have more time to retaliate, thus increasing the danger aspect of the ratio. Also, workplaces are often communal in nature. That is, people often work in groups and are surrounded by others. The presence of others acts as a built in audience that could "punish" the aggressor for harming a victim. It is for these reasons that individuals often choose covert forms of aggression.

== Predictors (antecedents) ==
Predictors of workplace aggression can occur at both the organizational level and the individual level. Organizational factors examined here include organizational justice, supervision and surveillance, changes in the work environment, and specific job characteristics. At the individual level, gender, age, and alcohol consumption are examined here. While this is not a comprehensive listing of predictors, it does cover the majority of workplace aggression predictors addressed in the empirical literature.

=== Organizational (in)justice ===
Perceived interpersonal justice, the degree to which people feel they are treated with fairness and respect, is negatively related to both psychological and physical aggression against supervisors. Inness, Barling, and Turner found similar results; perceived interpersonal injustice was related to workplace aggression in participants' primary and secondary jobs.

Moreover, perceived procedural justice, the extent to which formal organizational procedures are assumed fair, is related to workplace aggression against supervisors. Greenberg and Barling found that the greater the perceptions of procedural justice, the less workplace aggression was reported.

=== Termination and job security ===
The most extreme forms of workplace aggression may result from personnel decisions, such as individual termination and mass layoffs. In 2009 a man killed one and wounded five others at his former place of employment two years after he was let go from the company due to poor performance. A similar event occurred in 2012 when a man shot and killed four employees and then himself after losing his job earlier that day.

Downsizing is a tactic used by organizations where there is a loss of business to remain profitable or minimize losses. This tactic is most commonly observed during widespread economic hardships, such as the Great Recession. Perceived job insecurity, or feelings of impending termination, has been found to be a predictor of workplace aggression.

=== Supervision and surveillance ===
Workplace surveillance (employee monitoring) is positively related to workplace aggression against supervisors, such that the greater the number of employee surveillance methods used, the greater the amount of workplace aggression. Furthermore, supervisory control over work performance has also been shown positively related to workplace aggression against supervisors. This type of behavior has been observed both adults and teenagers.

=== Workplace changes ===
Baron and Neuman found that certain changes in the work environment can lead to increased aggression that they attribute to heightened anxiety and stress. Specifically, pay cuts or freezes, changes in management, increased monitoring systems (e.g., increased computer monitoring), increased diversity, and the increased use of part-time employees all were related to higher levels of workplace aggression.

=== Job-specific characteristics ===
Other antecedents of workplace aggression found in the literature are specific job characteristics. LeBlanc and Kelloway found that certain job features, such as handling guns or collecting valuable items, were significantly more related to workplace aggression.

=== Time spent at work ===
Harvey and Keashly found that length of time at work was able to predict workplace aggression such that the longer hours a person worked, the more likely they were to report aggression. The authors attributed this finding to two possible reasons. First, the more hours worked, the greater statistical probability of being victimized. Second, longer hours worked could contribute to fatigue and frustration. This in turn may increase the likelihood of aggressive actions towards coworkers.

=== Gender ===
In some studies, gender has been shown a significant predictor of workplace aggression. For example, being male is significantly related to reports of aggression against supervisors. Furthermore, males are more likely to commit aggressive acts in the presence of other men. This can be attributed to societal cultures that dictate "codes of honor." Females, on the other hand, are no more likely to act aggressively in either the presence of females or males.

=== Age ===
Age is significantly related to aggression. In their study of age and job performance, Ng and Feldman found that older workers (age 40 or older) engaged in less workplace aggression than younger workers.

=== Alcohol consumption ===
The frequency and amount of alcohol typically consumed by a person predicts aggressive behavior. Those who consume more alcohol more frequently are more likely to aggress against a coworker. The Hebei tractor rampage began as workplace aggression following alcohol consumption.

== Cyber-aggression ==
Cyber-aggression or cyber-harassment:

Takes the form of obscene or hate e-mail/text messages that threaten or frighten, or e-mails/text messages that contain offensive content, such as sexist or racist material. What is unique about this type of workplace harassment, compared to more traditional forms of harassment, is that this material can be sent by people in addition to work colleagues, by other individuals outside the workplace (either known or not known to the person) or even in the form of spam.

— Whitty & Carr

What many do not realize that the phenomenon of cyber-bullying often associated with teenage culture has spread to the workplace in a variety of ways. While this trend is seemingly silent and slow growing, its effects are considered equally hurtful as any form of harassment.

Often, cyber-aggression is the result of individuals in a workplace being offended/upset/or feeling threatened by organizational problems. They then resort to virtual communication as a form of retaliation. These actions are referred to as flaming by Whitty & Carr, or essentially when an individual online writes with hostility towards a particular person or group of people.

=== Instant messaging ===
Instant messaging has become both a help and a hindrance in organizations. The ease of use with instant messaging, is partially to blame, "Employees can see who else is available, and if it's someone they want to talk to, they're able to connect in real time". While this has become an extremely useful tool in workplace communication, instant messengers such at AIM or MSN Messenger are not easily regulated from a managerial aspect, which leads to employees being able to have private conversations on a public platform. These conversations can foster aggressive talk and lead to potentially hurtful information being spread among an organization. Some argue that instant messages are beneficial to the work process because it can easily resolve problems without having to distract the person via phone and you do not have to wait for an email response.

=== Email ===
This is one of the most prevalent tools used in cyber-aggression because of its prevalence in workplace communications. Often upset workers send loaded messages and attach the email to a large group of co-workers that are not involved in the issue to bring attention to it. An article from the Travel Trade Gazette give some advice to avoid being aggressive in emails.

- Always give a clear subject
- State exactly what you need in a simple manner
- Avoid terms like ASAP
- Only use reply all when it refers to the whole group
- Using all upper case is electronic SHOUTING!
- Do not use texting lexicon
- Never send an email when you are upset

== Outcomes ==
Like the array of behaviors considered workplace aggression, the consequences of workplace aggression are also extensive. For example, Ng and Feldman suggest that "acts of workplace aggression can cause bodily harm to employees, pose physical danger for customers, create public relations crises, and harm the business reputation of the firm as a whole." The outcomes of workplace aggression addressed here include the health and well-being of targeted employees and job performance. Gender differences in outcomes are also addressed.

Severity of the repercussions may be influenced by the position of the aggressor. Hershcovis and Barling found that "...supervisor aggression has the strongest adverse effects across attitudinal and behavioral outcomes", followed by co-worker aggression and outsider aggression.

=== Health and well-being ===
Workplace aggression can have devastating effects on an organization's employees. For example, it has been found that targets of workplace aggression report lower levels of well-being. Other studies have shown that aggression in the workplace can cause the victims of such behaviors to suffer from health problems and displaced aggression - including perpetuating aggression towards random strangers in the street. Bjorkqvist, Osterman, and Hjelt-Back even found that targets exhibited symptoms similar to those of post-traumatic stress disorder (PTSD), such as anxiety and depression. Sorensen et al. found possible associations between harassment at work and well-being measures of lower back pain and sleep deficiency among a sample of hospital workers.

=== Team performance ===
Research has looked at the negative impacts of workplace aggression on team performance and particularly team effectiveness as was evidenced in a study by Aube and Rousseau.

=== Job satisfaction ===
Victims of workplace aggression may suffer from reduced job satisfaction. Lapierre, Spector, and Leck found that those who perceived being targets of workplace aggression reported significantly lower overall job satisfaction. Similarly, those who perceive abuse from their supervisors report lower levels of job satisfaction.

=== Gender differences in outcomes ===
Research has shown that males and females react to workplace aggression differently. While both males and females have reported lower well-being after experiencing aggression in the workplace, studies indicate that the relationship between experienced workplace aggression and decreased well-being was stronger for men. In one study, results showed that men who experienced work aggression were more likely to report physical, psychosocial, affective, and cognitive problems. This study also showed that the type of aggression, whether it is overt or covert, did not matter for these outcomes. The study attributes these findings to the idea of modern-day masculinity, which stresses achievement and success in the workplace.

For females, nonsexual aggression has been found to have a stronger impact on job satisfaction than sexual aggression. Also, nonsexual aggression has a stronger relationship with job satisfaction in females than in males.

== Prevention ==
Prevention programs focus on reducing instances of workplace aggression. Programs that incorporate personnel selection, organizational sanctions, and training are recommended.

=== Personnel selection ===
Based on a workplace prevention program developed by the United States Postal Service (USPS), Neuman and Baron encourage organizations to use personnel screening and testing to identify potential employees who are likely to behave aggressively before they are even hired. This proactive strategy prevents individuals who are predisposed to aggress from even entering the workplace.

=== Organizational sanctions ===
Explicit policies regarding workplace aggression may help organizations to reduce aggression. Employees who perceived that their organization would punish workplace aggressors reported less workplace aggression even when their perceptions of interpersonal justice were high. Neuman and Baron also suggest using organizational policies to curb workplace aggression and to shape strong anti-aggressive organizational norms.

=== Training ===
Training has been shown to improve healthcare professionals knowledge, however may not help reduce how often healthcare workers experience aggressive bevhaviour. Neuman and Baron suggest that training for both supervisors and subordinates should focus on teaching employees methods for dealing with aggression. Similarly, Rai advises that appropriate training should inform employees that management takes threats seriously, encourage employees to report incidents, and demonstrate management's commitment to deal with reported incidents.

=== Organizational support ===
Organizational support can influence the effects of workplace aggression. Schat and Kelloway isolated two forms of organizational support: instrumental and informational. Instrumental support refers to providing some type of assistance directly to an afflicted individuals, whereas information support refers to providing employees with self-help informational resources.

== See also ==
- Abusive supervision
- Brodie's Law (act)
- Counterproductive work behavior
- Cyber-aggression in the workplace
- Deviance (sociology)
- Going postal
- Industrial and organizational psychology
- Occupational health psychology
- Passive-aggressive behavior
- Social undermining
- Workplace bullying
- Workplace conflict
- Workplace harassment
- Workplace incivility
- Workplace revenge
- Workplace violence
