= Going postal =

Slang for outbursts of anger or violence

Going postal is an American English slang phrase referring to becoming extremely angry or uncontrollable, often to the point of violence, and usually in a workplace environment. The expression derives from a series of incidents in which United States Postal Service (USPS) workers shot and killed people in acts of mass murder. Between 1970 and 1997, more than 40 people were killed by then-current or former employees in at least 20 incidents of workplace rage.

== Origin ==
An early use of the phrase was on December 17, 1993, in the American newspaper the St. Petersburg Times:

The symposium was sponsored by the U.S. Postal Service, which has seen so many outbursts that in some circles excessive stress is known as "going postal." Thirty-five people have been killed in 11 post office shootings since 1983. The USPS does not approve of the term "going postal" and has made attempts to stop people from using the saying. Some postal workers, however, feel it has earned its place.

On December 31, 1993, the Los Angeles Times said, "Unlike the more deadly mass shootings around the nation, which have lent a new term to the language, referring to shooting up the office as 'going postal'."

As a result of two shootings on the same day on May 6, 1993, in 1993 the USPS created 85 Workplace Environment Analysts for domicile at its 85 postal districts. These new positions were created to help with violence prevention and workplace improvement. In February 2009, the USPS unilaterally eliminated these positions as part of its downsizing efforts.

== Notable postal shootings ==
=== Edmond, Oklahoma, 1986 ===
On August 20, 1986, postman Patrick Sherrill shot and killed 14 employees and wounded six at the Edmond, Oklahoma, post office. Sherrill then killed himself with a shot to the forehead.

=== Royal Oak, Michigan, 1991 ===
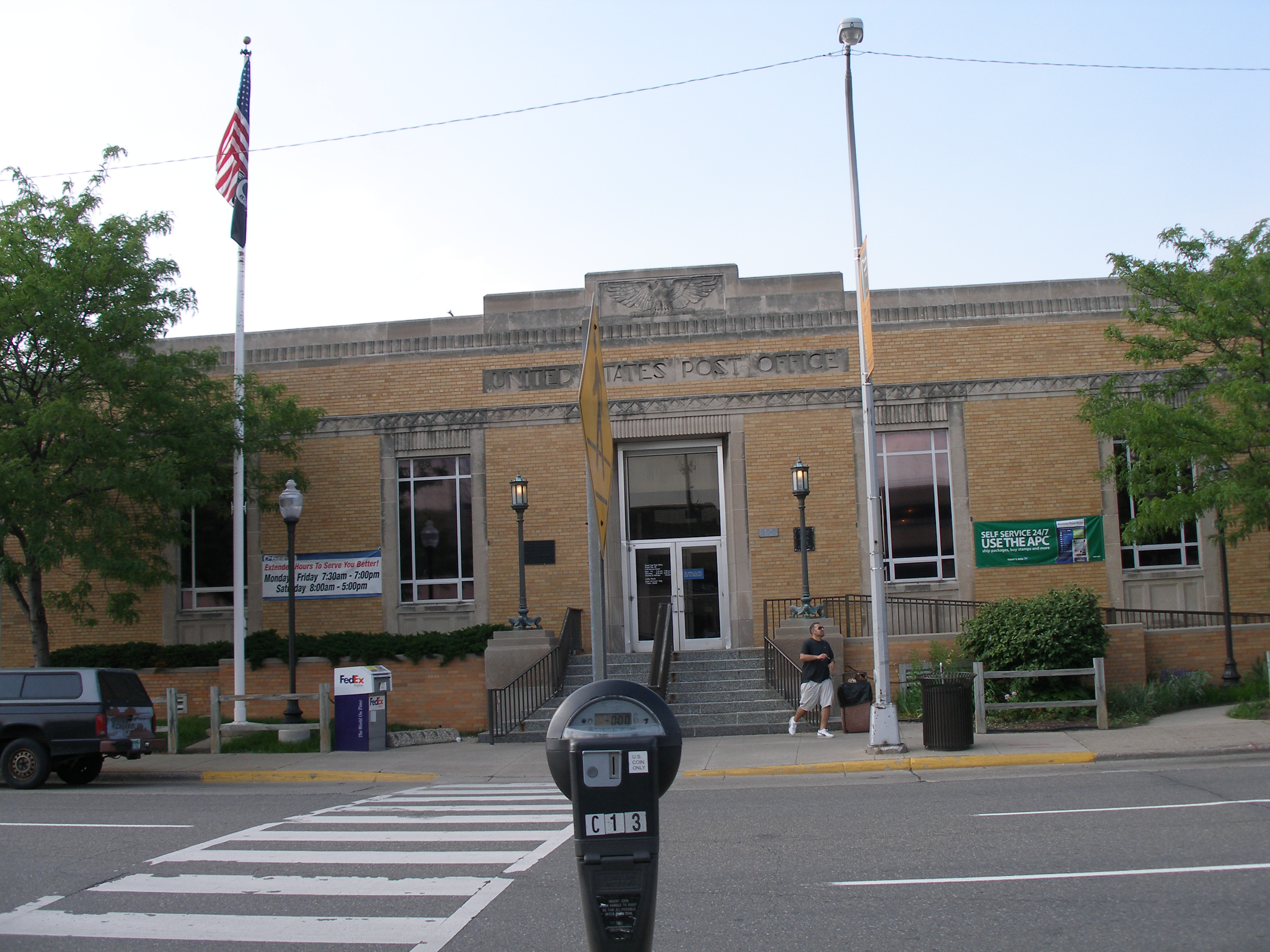
The U.S. post office in Royal Oak

On November 14, 1991, in Royal Oak, Michigan, Thomas McIlvane killed five people, including himself, and injured five others with a rifle in Royal Oak's post office, after being fired from the Postal Service for "insubordination". He had been previously suspended for getting into altercations with postal customers on his route.

For some time before the Royal Oak incident, the service had experienced labor/management and operational problems and customer service complaints. This had drawn the attention of local media. The Office of Senator Carl Levin investigated Royal Oak, the results of which were summarized in a September 10, 1991, staff memorandum. The memorandum documented "patterns of harassment, intimidation, cruelty and allegations of favoritism in promotions and demotions ... [and] testimony relating to wide-ranging delivery and service problems" before the McIlvane shooting.

=== Goleta, California, 2006 ===
On January 30, 2006, 44-year-old Jennifer San Marco, a former postal employee, shot and killed six postal employees at a large postal processing facility in Goleta, California before committing suicide. Police later also identified a seventh victim dead in a condominium complex in Goleta where San Marco once lived. According to media reports, the Postal Service had forced San Marco to retire in 2003 because of her worsening mental problems. The incident is believed to be the deadliest workplace shooting ever carried out in the United States by a woman.

== Analysis ==
In 1998, the United States Congress conducted a joint hearing to review the violence in the U.S. Postal Service. In the hearing, it was noted that while the postal service accounted for less than 1% of the full-time civilian labor force, 13% of workplace homicides were committed at postal facilities by current or former employees.

In 2000, researchers found that the homicide rates at postal facilities were lower than at other workplaces. In major industries, the highest rate of 2.1 homicides per 100,000 workers per year was in retail. The homicide rate for postal workers was 0.22 per 100,000 versus 0.77 per 100,000 workers in general. The common depiction of an employee returning to work for revenge on their boss is over-stated. More than half of mass workplace shootings are by current employees, and a little under a quarter are by employees who have been at their job for less than a year.

== In popular culture ==
In the controversial video game series Postal, the player takes on the role of a mass murderer in the first game, and in later games a first-person role performing normally mundane chores (such as picking up a paycheck from work) with an often gratuitously violent twist. In 1997, the USPS sued the creators of the game, Running with Scissors, over the use of the term "postal". Running with Scissors argued that, despite its title, the game has absolutely nothing to do with the USPS or its employees. The case was dismissed with prejudice in 2003.

The 1994 comedy film Naked Gun 33 1/3: The Final Insult includes a scene where the main character must deal with a series of escalating threats, including the sudden appearance of dozens of disgruntled postal workers randomly firing weapons in every direction.

In the 1996 simulation game Afterlife, one of Wrath's punishments involves putting two groups of sinful souls in a post office, one in line to send a package and another working in the mail room, expecting both to get frustrated and grab rifles to initiate shootouts.

In the 1995 film Clueless, Cher Horowitz, played by Alicia Silverstone, frets, "I had an overwhelming sense of ickiness... like Josh thinking I was mean was making me postal."

In the 1995 fantasy film Jumanji, after the hunter Van Pelt purchases a replacement rifle at the local gun shop and then bribes the clerk into filling out the necessary legal documents for him, the clerk asks Van Pelt whether he is a postal worker.

The 2004 Discworld novel Going Postal by Terry Pratchett centers around Moist von Lipwig, a con artist and criminal, who as punishment is made the Postmaster General of Ankh-Morpork and forced to revive the Post Office. The phrase "going postal" meaning "to go mad" is used in subsequent books in reference to the events of the novel.

In the Brooklyn Nine-Nine episode "USPIS", self-righteous United States Postal Inspection Service agent Jack Danger (pronounced Donger), who is passionate about his job, is adamant that "going postal" is the term most associated with bringing goodness into people's lives, which is a view shared by his co-workers, though not the NYPD detectives.

== See also ==
- Amok syndrome
- David Berkowitz, serial killer who worked for the postal service
- Crashing out
- Fragging
- Indianapolis FedEx shooting
- Mad as a hatter
- Road rage
