= Outline of working time and conditions =

Overview of and topical guide to working time and conditions

The following outline is provided as an overview of and topical guide to working time and conditions:

== Legislation ==
- Collective agreement
- Holiday pay
- International Labour Organization
- Labor rights
- Labour law
- Leave of absence
- Legal working age
- List of minimum annual leave by country
- Minimum wage
- Parental leave
- Right to sit
- Sick leave
- Unemployment benefits
- Unemployment extension
- Workers' right to access the toilet

== Working time ==
- Annual leave
- Effects of overtime
- Flextime
- Four-day workweek
- Karoshi
- List of countries by average annual labor hours
- Overwork
- Right to rest and leisure
- Six-hour day
- Work–life balance

== Working conditions ==
- Biosafety level
- Casual Friday
- Decent work
- Dress code
- Gainful employment
- Happiness at work
- Industrial noise
- Industrial and organizational psychology
- Managing up and managing down
- Office humor
- Occupational justice
- Occupational safety and health
- Occupational Safety and Health Administration
- Protective clothing
- Temporary work
- Whistleblower
- Work–life balance
- Workplace politics

=== Adverse conditions ===
- Employment discrimination
- Exhaustion disorder
- Hostile work environment
- Job lock
- Narcissistic leadership
- Occupational apartheid
- Occupational burnout
- Occupational cardiovascular disease
- Occupational injustice
- Occupational stress
- Organizational retaliatory behavior
- Unpaid work
- Work accident
- Work–family conflict
- Workplace aggression
- Workplace bullying
  - Legal aspects of workplace bullying
- Workplace deviance
- Workplace incivility

== See also ==
- Critique of work
- Job attitude
- Job strain
- Labor rights
- Paid time off
- Post-work society
- Refusal of work
- Trade union
- Wage slavery
- Working poor
- Work motivation
