= Employee silence =

Lack of communication within an organization

Employee silence refers to situations where employees withhold information that might be useful to the organization of which they are a part, whether intentionally or unintentionally. This can happen if employees do not speak up to a supervisor or manager.

Within organizations people often have to make decisions about whether to speak up or remain silent - whether to share or withhold their ideas, opinions, and concerns ... [The problem is that] in many cases, they choose the safe response of silence, withholding input that could be valuable to others or thoughts that they wish they could express.

— Frances J. Milliken and Elizabeth Wolfe Morrison, Shades of Silence: Emerging Themes and Future Directions for Research on Silence in Organizations

This means the situation is not going to change for the better anytime soon. Employee silence does not only occur between management and employees, it also occurs during conflict among employees, and as a result of organizational decisions. This silence keeps managers from receiving information that may help to improve the organization.

== Incidence ==
Employee silence, the antithesis of employee voice, refers to situations where employees suppress information that might be useful to the organization of which they are a part. One way this can happen is if employees do not speak up to a supervisor or manager.

Van Dyne et al. (2003) define silence as an employee's motivation to withhold or express ideas, information and opinions about work‐related improvements. This silence can be intentional or unintentional; information can be consciously held back by employees. Or it can be an unintentional failure to communicate or a merely a matter of having nothing to say (Tangirala and Ramanujam, 2008). In an organization, this is interesting because it appears that silence is a communicative choice that employees may decide to adopt.

Indeed, when there is a problem in the workplace, employees have two options: remain silent or speak up. Unfortunately, many employees choose to remain silent because they do not want to share information that could be interpreted as negative or threatening. Employees typically remain silent about conflicts with co-workers, disagreements about organizational decisions, potential weaknesses in work processes, illegal or dangerous behaviors, and individual/personal grievances. Their silence keeps management from receiving critical information that would allow their organizations to improve or address problems before they have adverse effects.

The question of why employees choose to communicate or not in an organizational setting is an interesting one. As Milliken et al. (2003) state, “there is evidence from a variety of sources that employees often do not feel comfortable speaking to their bosses about organizational problems or issues that concern them.” Employees might be afraid of the outcome of speaking up, they might feel like nothing will change, they might simply feel intimidated with the subject matter that they wish to express, or they might feel intimidated by whom they would have to talk to. Also, if their co-workers aren't speaking up, they might be inclined to close their mouths as well, termed "collective silence". They might not want to break away from the crowd and present an opinion that differs from the majority. Or, employees might not feel like they possess enough power to speak up and voice their opinions; this notion is of particular significance when the organization is structured and set up as a hierarchy or bureaucracy.

Employee silence can occur in any organization, most often in organizations where communication is suffering. Employee silence causes the most damage when employees and supervisors do not meet on a regular basis. In a virtual workplace this is also true. In a virtual workplace the only in-person communication is in small discussion groups. This kind of organization is very susceptible to employee silence because there is almost no person-to-person communication, and it is very easy to ignore or misinterpret things like email. Employee silence is a problem for more than just virtual organizations. Within the past few years employee silence has been happening more often in non-virtual organizations. Organizations where considerable risk is involved such as airports and “hospitals; should be especially mindful of” employee silence. This is because mistakes caused by employee silence in these organizations can lead to the loss of life or serious damage costs to the organization.

== Causes ==
There are many different reasons for the start of employee silence in an organization. According to the Handbook of Organizational Justice, "a culture of injustice in organizations, be it distributive, procedural, or interactional (what we would call interpersonal), can lead to employee silence." In other words, "if the organizational norm is an unjust environment such as one that is characterized by intense supervisory control, suppression of conflict, ambiguous reporting structures, and poorly conducted performance reviews, employees will choose not to exercise voice and will therefore not receive the benefits available to those that do express opinions and ideas."

One obvious cause of employee silence is constant negative feedback from supervisors. When an employee gives a supervisor a suggestion and is shot down, employee silence is developed in an organization. Over time employees start to feel that every time they make a suggestion it will not be taken into consideration or will be rejected. A result of this is called a dissenting voice, which contributes to employee silence. The dissenting voice is that of the supervisor shooting someone down. Supervisors, leaders, and managers alike can avoid the occurrence of a dissenting voice among employees by monitoring their management style. Cooperative styles such as "integrating, obliging, and compromising" are more effective than "avoiding and dominating" styles, which could cause silence among employees (Colquitt and Greenberg 312).

Another reason employee silence occurs is because people fear that if they speak up they may lose their jobs. In some cases subordinates don't want to appear as though they are going against their supervisors, as they may view the employees' input as criticism of their practices, and be fired. This is especially true of organizations which have just experienced layoffs. In these cases, employees fear that their jobs could be taken away and are even less likely to voice their opinions than they did in the first place.

Another cause of employee silence is when supervisors and employees fail to address problems. Avoiding problems or looking for "quick fixes" only makes things worse and causes employees to feel that there is no hope for resolution. If employees lose hope that the real problems will actually be addressed and resolved, it can lead to a host of problems for the organization and for the employee, one of which is continued employee silence. Employees then start to feel it is better to remain silent about issues because nothing will change anyway. If companies want to be successful they need to confront the actual problem and fix it. Both employee and supervisor need to deal with the situation because employee silence usually stems from higher management down to lower level employees, which is the cause of the indifferent employee.

=== Discursive formations ===
A discursive formation is defined as the regularities that produce such discourse. Discourse (acts of speaking and writing) is the medium by which an individual's behavior is framed for him/her and others. We are who we are, based on our communicative practices with others. Foucault uses this concept in his analysis of the political economy and natural history, but it's very useful when studying organizational communication. Discursive formations perhaps can intensify the conditioning of the silent employee based on the power aspect of the discourse itself. When one speaks or writes, a message can be delivered in a certain context, and that can have an effect on the employee on whether or not to remain silent. Discourse is the product of the dominant power interests in organizations and these interests can perpetuate themselves based on the ideology that is represented through them. Employees can feel less powerful as a result of hearing dominant opinions and perceptions; these practices can encourage silence naturally.

Many factors contribute to the notion of employee silence, especially when it comes to how one is placed or ranked in an organizational structure. There are distinct organizational groupings or divisions, such as masculine or feminine, subordinate or dominant, manager or employee, that can influence silence. The way superiors communicate with subordinates determines the climate and the culture of the organization. Employees begin to identify themselves throughout the culture they work in, by the ways in which they participate in work rituals, through the relationships they form with co-workers and managers, and through the language/discourse they use. Communication is thus at the forefront of how employees perceive themselves in relation to the organization and in regards to their relationships with other people.

Research by Milliken et al. (2003) suggests that employee silence is related to social capital (valuable resources such as trust and goodwill that are embedded within a social structure). Employees work hard to build and maintain social capital and typically do not engage in behaviors that may weaken or sever these vital social ties. They do not want to risk looking bad; this will reflect on their identity, their role, and their overall connection to the organization. This is pertinent as it relates to employee identity and power. Since employees perceive themselves in relations to others, they do not want to ruin their public image because that image alone protects their social capital.

=== Additional causes ===
In organizations, there is evidence that employees are especially uncomfortable conveying information about potential problems or issues to those above them (Milliken et al. 2003). This knowledge brings up the notion of hierarchy and subordinate/supervisor relationships. Someone in a lower position will be uncomfortable expressing issues to someone in a higher position. If, however, subordinates have close, positive, interpersonal relationships with their supervisors, chances are higher that they will choose to communicate honestly. It comes down to the basic principle of trust and mutual appreciation, which is difficult to obtain in a bureaucratic structure. Willman, P. et al. (2006) present evidence that any hierarchical organization tends to support what its leaders already think is true more than it challenges them to think differently. The levels below the leaders are more interested in keeping their jobs than in telling the truth.

But once a relationship is established, and the lines of communication are open, it is undeniably easier to have others on your side and others who are willing to help you out, both professionally and personally. Pfeffer (2010) acknowledges the dynamic relationship among trust, relationships, and power when he says, “Sometimes building a relationship so that others will help you requires nothing more than being polite and listening... Being nice to people is effective because people find it difficult to fight with those who are being polite and courteous.” When that key component of mutual understanding is absent in an organizational setting, however, silence comes into play, and a myriad of power schemes and competing agendas can influence the decision of whether or not to communicate concerns.

Donaghey, J. et al. (2011) suggest ways in which management, through agenda-setting and institutional structures, can perpetuate silence over a range of issues, thereby arranging employees out of the voice process. When a dominant group voices certain opinions, these perceptions become the dominant ideologies that float across the organization. The subordinate viewpoints are therefore never brought to the forefront because they are inevitably silenced.

Tangirala and Ramanujam (2008) conducted research on nurses in Midwestern hospitals to study employee silence in health care. With lives at stake every day, the notion of employee silence in such an industry is a particularly devastating one due to its potential implications. Their research showed that the more power a supervisor is perceived to have, the less likely it was that nurses would share critical information. They did not want to cause unnecessary tension and sever professional bonds with their bosses. They didn't want to cause a stir; in their minds, it was better to remain silent than address conflicts and clear up confusion.

The research also found that nurses were less silent when they identified with their workgroup, felt proud of and attached to their jobs, and perceived a high level of fairness in the workplace. These startling revelations relate to Pfeffer's key point of acting like one has it (confidence and power); perception is everything and perception is reality. He states, “We choose how we will act and talk, and those decisions are consequential for acquiring and holding on to power” (2010). It is clear when employees feel they don't have a stake, a personal investment, in an organization, they will choose to remain silent.

So how can organizations reduce employee silence and increase employee commitment? According to Ewing (1977), managers need to create a safe place for employees to voice their concerns. They should create a comfortable, open space or environment where employees do not feel intimidated or threatened by either internal or external circumstances.

Tangirala and Ramanujam (2008) suggest that organizational pride should be enhanced in the minds and souls of workers. Employees need to feel a high amount of satisfaction in order to positively identify with their organization. Managers can also increase employee pride in their professions by giving constructive feedback after projects are completed and by engaging in constant training to continually enhance performance. Employees need to feel like their contributions matter, and that their work is significant and meaningful. When this occurs, employees will feel like they truly do matter in an organization; they will become active players and voice their concerns freely and without fear. They will more positively identify with their organizations, thus bringing the whole idea of employee identity, communication and job satisfaction full circle.

== Effects ==
=== Organizational effects ===
Employee silence is extremely detrimental to organizations, often causing an “escalating level of dissatisfaction” among employees, “which manifests itself in absenteeism and turnover and perhaps other undesired behaviors”. Communication is the key to an organization's success. If employee silence does occur, communication suffers, and as a result harms the overall functioning of the organization. In his article “Get Talking”, author Chris Penttila says, “employee silence is killing innovation and perpetuating poorly planned projects that lead to defective products, low morale and a damaged bottom line”. This indicates how much an organization can suffer just because of a lack of proper communication.

In an article titled “Re-Creating the Indifferent Employee”, Carla Joinson talks about negative effects of employee silence such as monetary losses to the organization. Over time silence within organizations causes some employees to be extremely indifferent. Indifferent employees are those who are “indifferent to their jobs, employers and quality of work”. They cause the organization to lose money and function poorly. Unfortunately when major monetary losses are detected in organizations, managers tend to react by trying to recover the loss, overlooking the fact that employees have become indifferent as a result of unaddressed employee silence. More often than not employees who are not doing their share of the work are also not speaking up about the problems they see, leading to a perpetual cycle of employee silence (Joinson 1048).

=== Effects on employees ===
Indifferent employees, often products of ignored employee silence, tend to feel like cogs at machinery factories, developing the attitude “to get along, go along”. They sometimes develop depression and other health problems. Sometimes these employees use pills and alcohol as a “cure” for the problems they are experiencing at work, which actually make their problems worse. In the book Moose on the Table by Jim Clemmer, Pete, the main character, develops these types of health problems. Another example of such effects on employees is articulated by researcher Subrahmaniam Tangirala who says that “employee silence affects the personal well being of employees, increases stress,” and causes them to “feel guilty, where they often experience psychological problems, and have trouble seeing the possibility of change.” Most people assume that employee silence only hurts the organization, but realistically it hurts both the organization and the employees.

=== Moose on the Table ===
Moose on the Table by author Jim Clemmer is a useful tool in studying what can actually happen when employee silence is a problem in the workplace. Clemmer uses a metaphor to explain the effects of employee silence and poor communication in organizations. He formulates the metaphor using a character named Pete, who begins to see imaginary moose in his place of work that represent all the problems that aren't being addressed and have gotten larger over time. The book portrays what can happen to employees and organizations when this problem is ignored. Clemmer suggests that organizations who suffer from employee silence should take an interactive approach. First, it is important to recognize that there is in fact a problem with employee silence. Managers and employees must then work together to identify what issues aren't being talked about. In doing so, managers might conduct interviews with employees and disperse surveys. Employees "often have ideas, information, and opinions for constructive ways to improve work and organizations". As such, employees want to know that their opinions are important and are not only being taken into consideration, but are being acted upon as well.

== Procedural justice ==
Procedural justice “refers to how people go about planning decisions and implementing them”. Specifically, this term can be applied to managers within organizations, who must make decisions that will affect their subordinates. Employees within these organizations who feel that these procedures were executed fairly reflect that it is a high procedural fairness climate.

=== Procedural justice/fairness climates ===
According to researcher Subrah Tangirala, an expert on the topic of employee silence, “Procedural justice climate as related to employee silence, exists when a majority of employees in a workgroup feel that their managers make decisions that include employee input, that are ethical, that are consistent over time and based on accurate information, suppress any bias, and provide favorable contexts for employees to speak up.” Based on such criteria, procedural fairness climates make for the most favorable and healthy work environments for organizations and employees, in that they reduce the likelihood of employee silence. Research on this area suggests that “silence may be a rational response to some forms of unfairness when in a low power position”. Procedural fairness climates enable workers “to feel the most safe” and “provide favorable contexts for employees to speak up.” It is when employees perceive that they are being “unfairly treated” that they begin to withhold important information from the organization.

== Avoidance ==
Since the effects of employee silence can be severe and detrimental to the overall functioning of a company, organizations should try to minimize it. One way to do this would be to try to establish procedural climates. Another way to prevent employee silence is to create an employee who is committed the organization. This is done by showing that the organization is fair and committed to its employees. When the organization is committed to the employee, the employee in return is committed to the organization, which limits employee silence.

== Establishing procedural justice climates ==
In order to establish procedural justice climates, managers need to ensure that their decisions are “ethical, consistent over time, based on accurate information, allow room for employees to contribute input, are correctable, and are free of bias." Managers can establish these climates by being mindful when executing:

- Organization changes such as large scale layoffs, the introduction of new technology, restructuring, and relocation.
- Individually targeted events such as performance appraisals and one on one negotiations.

=== Downsizing and procedural justice climates ===
Changes such as downsizing often actually increase employee silence in organizations among the remaining employees. For example, if the process of the layoff was done poorly and without concern, employees feel that decisions are being made unfairly. If this happens, employees fear the security of their own jobs. A “high degree of variance in survivors’ reactions to layoffs” indicates the absence of a procedural justice climate. When layoffs are performed fairly in organizations, reactions are not varied and employees do not fear the security of their jobs.

Other things that effect employee silence are commitment levels of employees to their careers, and the status of the manager.

According to Subrah Tangirala “people who are committed to their professions and value their work highly are those who would be less likely to remain silent.” He also notes that the “status of the manager has an impact on employees speaking up.” Employees are more likely to withhold information from managers with “high power status’” because they don’t want to be seen as criticizing them. “employees are especially uncomfortable conveying information about potential problems or issues to those above them. For example, several studies have shown that subordinates distort the information that they convey to their superiors, communicating upward in a way that minimizes negative information,” or withholds the information entirely. According to an article on employee silence, “structuring groups into hierarchies automatically introduces restraints against free communication, particularly criticisms by low-status members toward those in higher-status positions.” In other words, high status can intimidate employees causing them to be silent in order to protect their jobs and relationships.

When trying to avoid employee silence, managers and leaders also need to know “how to facilitate varying opinions in a way that allows healthy discussion to develop towards consensus or best solutions”. In a recent business column entitled “Silence Does Not Equal Agreement,” some advice is given for leaders looking to diminish employee silence. The article suggests:

1. "When presenting information or asking questions of a group, make eye contact with each person at the table or as many people as possible in the room. This gesture gives a message of interest and connectedness.
2. Watch for the subtle signs of people agreeing or disagreeing with what is being said. Positive gestures include: maintaining eye contact, a slight smile, nodding. Gestures of dissension include: raised eyebrows, rolling of eyes, a slight sneer, looking down, shifting in the seat, avoiding eye contact.
3. When someone does make a comment or suggestion, do not rush to discount their opinion or defend your own. To shut down someone who speaks up will send the message that you are not sincere, and people will retreat back into non-participation. Instead, say something like, ‘Thanks for your idea, Holly, let me think about that.’
4. Learn to be comfortable with silence. It takes getting used to, but allowing silence to be in the room is a powerful presence that gives people a chance to digest what was said, and to consider whether they have a response or contribution, and how they may want to present it.
5. If you try to encourage more openness, and at first others are unresponsive or hesitant to participate, consider asking someone you trust after the meeting if there is something that you might have missed or could have done differently to achieve the desired result".

== Interactional justice ==
In a podcast entitled "Under New Management", Joel Brockner, a professor of business at Columbia University, talks about the importance of the "interpersonal component of procedural fairness called 'interactional justice.'" Interactional justice refers to "how the employee feels that the implementer did things." Some questions they might ask that “have a huge bearing on whether or not people think the procedure was fair” are:

1. Did they express concern?
2. Did they show signs of treating the person with dignity? ...respect? ...compassion?
3. Did they provide an explanation?

If employees can answer "yes" to these questions, then the implementer has done things fairly and it is likely that employee silence has either been reduced or avoided.

== Areas for further research ==
Employee silence emerged as a topic of organisational research in the late 20th and early 21st centuries, particularly in relation to communication practices and workplace behaviour. Earlier management practices often treated employees primarily as components of organisational production systems rather than as participants in decision-making processes. Research on employee silence has examined both individual-level factors, such as job satisfaction, and group-level factors, including organisational climate and formal communication channels.

Future research should be devoted to the study of one's professional position in a company and whether this has any effect on the decision to remain silent. It would be interesting to discover if job titles play a part in employee silence or it's just a matter of analyzing each individual situation or event.

Another area of potential future research should delve into the notion of silence as the absence of speech (a non-behavior, essentially). The absence of such a behavior is difficult to study than more overt and obvious behavior (Johannesen, 1974). This act has many implications for employee and organizational performance.

Non-verbal behavior should be addressed as well in future studies of employee silence. It might be beneficial to research the effect of body language and the importance of gestures to interpret employees' motives. Perhaps these cues symbolize much more and possess meaning for studying silence in organizations.

== A more critical approach ==
In an article published in Work, Employment and Society in March 2011, Jimmy Donaghey (University of Warwick), Niall Cullinane (Queen's University Belfast), Tony Dundon (NUI Galway) and Adrian Wilkinson (Griffith University) survey the existing literature on employee silence and argue that the approach taken to date neglects an analysis of the role of management in constructing silence. The thesis is put forward that to truly understand processes of employee silence, it is necessary to recognise that silence may work in favour of management, and thus management may have an interest in maintaining or creating employee silence.

== See also ==
- Passive–aggressive behavior
- Workplace deviance
