= Workplace deviance =

Deliberate desire to cause harm to an organization or workplace

Workplace deviance, in group psychology, may be described as the deliberate (or intentional) desire to cause harm to an organization – more specifically, a workplace. The concept has become an instrumental component in the field of organizational communication. More accurately, it can be seen as "voluntary behavior that violates institutionalized norms and in doing so threatens the well-being of the organization".

== Reasons ==
=== Psychological contract ===
Employees often create a set of expectations about their workplace; people tend to make psychological contracts with their organizations. When their expectations are not met, the employee may "perceive a psychological contract breach by their employers". This "breach" of the psychological contract then presents potential problems, particularly in the workplace.

Workplace deviance may arise from the worker's perception that their organization has mistreated them in some manner. Employees then resort to misbehaving (or acting out) as a means of avenging their organization for the perceived wrongdoing. Workplace deviance may be viewed as a form of negative reciprocity: "the tendency for an individual to return negative treatment for negative treatment". In other words, the maxim "an eye for an eye" is a concept that some employees strongly feel is a suitable approach to their problem. However, what is critical in understanding employee deviance is that the employee perceives being wronged, whether or not mistreatment actually occurred.

=== Abusive supervision ===
Workplace deviance is also closely related to abusive supervision. Abusive supervision is defined as the "subordinates' perceptions of the extent to which their supervisors engage in the sustained display of hostile verbal and nonverbal behaviors". This could be when supervisors ridicule their employees, give them the silent treatment, remind them of past failures, fail to give proper credit, wrongfully assign blame or blow up in fits of temper. It may seem like employees who are abused by their supervisor will either directly retaliate or withdraw by quitting the job but in reality many strike out against their employer by engaging in organizational deviant behaviors. Since employees control many of the organization's resources, they often use, or abuse anything they can. This abuse of resources may come in the form of time, office supplies, raw materials, finished products or the services that they provide. This usually occurs in two steps. First step is that commitment is destroyed and employees stop caring about the welfare of the employer. The second step is that the abused employee will get approval (normally implied) of their coworkers to commit deviant acts.

Workplace experiences may fuel the worker to act out. Research has been conducted demonstrating that the perception of not being respected is one of the main causes for workplace deviance; workplace dissatisfaction is also a factor. According to Bolin and Heatherly, "dissatisfaction results in a higher incidence of minor offenses, but does not necessarily lead to severe offense". An employee who is less satisfied with their work may become less productive as their needs are not met. In the workplace, "frustration, injustices and threats to self are primary antecedents to employee deviance". Although workplace deviance does occur, the behavior is not universal. There are two preventive measures that business owners can use to protect themselves. The first is strengthening the employee's commitment by reacting strongly to abusive supervision so that the employee knows that the behavior is not accepted. Holding the employee at high esteem by reminding them of their importance, or setting up programs that communicate concern for the employee may also strengthen employee commitment. Providing a positive ethical climate can also help. Employers can do this by having a clear code of conduct that is applied to both managers and employees alike.

== Types ==
Workplace deviance may be expressed in various ways. Employees can engage in minor, extreme, nonviolent or violent behavior, which ultimately leads to an organization's decline in productivity. Interpersonal and organizational deviance are two forms of workplace deviance which are directed differently; however, both cause harm to an organization.

=== Interpersonal deviance ===
Interpersonal deviance can occur when misconduct "target(s) specific stakeholders such as coworkers". Behavior falling within this subgroup of employee deviance includes gossiping about coworkers and assigning blame to them. These minor (but unhealthy) behaviors, directed at others, are believed to occur as some employees perceive "a sense of entitlement often associated with exploitation". In other words, they feel the need to misbehave in ways that will benefit them.

=== Organizational deviance ===
Deviant behavior typically aimed directly at the organization is often referred to as organizational deviance. Organizational deviance encompasses production and property deviance. Workplace-deviant behavior may be expressed as tardiness or excessive absenteeism. These behaviors have been cited by some researchers as "withdraw(al) behaviors…such behaviors allow employees to withdraw physically and emotionally from the organization".

=== Silence ===
Employee silence is also considered a deviant behavior in the workplace, falling into the realms of both interpersonal and organizational deviance. Silence becomes employee deviance when "an employee intentionally or unintentionally withholds any kind of information that might be useful to the organization". The problem occurs if an employee fails to disclose important information, which detrimentally affects the effectiveness of the organization due to poor communication.

=== Coworker backstabbing ===
Coworker backstabbing occurs to some degree in many workplaces. It consists of an employee's doing something to another employee to get a "leg up" on the other employee. Strategies used for backstabbing include dishonesty, blame (or false accusation), discrediting others and taking credit for another's work. Motives for backstabbing include disregarding others' rights in favor of one's own gain, self-image management, revenge, jealousy, and personal reasons.

=== Cyber loafing ===
A novel form of workplace deviance has emerged in recent years, as technology becomes a bigger part of people's work lives. Internet workplace deviance (or "cyber loafing") has become another way for employees to avoid the tasks at hand. This includes surfing the web and doing non-work-related tasks on the internet such as chatting on social-networking sites, online shopping and other activities.

=== Production deviance ===
All behaviors in which deviant employees partake ultimately have a negative impact on the overall productivity of the organization. For this reason, all are considered production deviance. Production deviance is "behavior that violates formally prescribed organizational norms with respect to minimal quality and quantity of work to be accomplished as part of one's job".

=== Property deviance ===
More serious cases of deviant behavior harmful to an organization concern property deviance. Property deviance is "where employees either damage or acquire tangible assets…without authorization". This type of deviance typically involves theft but may include "sabotage, intentional errors in work, misusing expense accounts", among other examples.

=== Other types ===
Deviant behavior can be much more extreme, involving sexual harassment or violence. All these deviant behaviors create problems for the organization. It is costly for an organization to pay employees who are not working efficiently.

== Reducing ==
The relationships employees have with their organization are crucial, as they can play an important role in the development of workplace deviance. Employees who perceive their organization or supervisor(s) as more caring (or supportive) have been shown to have a reduced incidence of workplace-deviant behaviors. Supervisors, managers and organizations are aware of this, and "assess their own behaviors and interactions with their employees and understand while they may not intend to abuse their employees they may be perceived as doing so…".

Organizational justice and the organizational climate are also critical, since the quality of the work experience can impact employee behavior in the workplace. Organizational justice may be organized into three subcategories: procedural, distributive and interactional justice.

- Procedural justice is concerned with how the decision-making process was made.
- Distributive justice, on the other hand, considers the actual decision.
- Interactional justice involves the interpersonal relationship and sense of fairness which employees have with supervisors and other authority figures within the organization.

Research indicates that procedural justice (combined with interactional justice) is beneficial in reducing workplace-deviant behavior. Employees who are consulted (and given an opportunity to be involved in the decision-making processes at their organization) are less likely to act out, since their voices are valued.

Workplace deviance is a phenomenon which occurs frequently within an organization. Ultimately, it is the managers' and the organization's responsibility to uphold the norms to which the organization wishes to adhere; it is the organization's job to create an ethical climate. If organizations have authority figures who demonstrate their ethical values, a healthier workplace environment is created. "Research has suggested that managers' behavior influences employee ethical decision-making". Employees who perceive themselves as being treated respectfully and valued are those less likely to engage in workplace deviance.

== See also ==
- Counterproductive work behavior
- Deviance (sociology)
- Gaming the system
- Machiavellianism in the workplace
- Malicious compliance
- Workplace bullying
- Workplace harassment
- Workplace revenge
