= Zero price =

Zero price may refer to:

- Free of charge, a price of zero
- The offering price of a Zero-coupon bond or its financial equivalent
