= Free of charge =

Goods or services provided without payment

Free of charge, at no charge, at no cost, complimentary, gratis, and the like are phrases or terms used to indicate that a thing for which a monetary cost is normally assessed is being provided without any payment being required.

Such expressions are commonly used in commerce and public administration to indicate that no payment is required from the immediate recipient. However, providing something free of charge does not necessarily entail there being no associated costs, as alluded to, for example, in the adage that there is "no such thing as a free lunch". These potential costs may be covered by the provider, funded collectively or by third parties, or take the form of non-monetary costs to the recipient.

== Economics ==
Economists have long distinguished between goods and services provided free of charge and those financed directly by their users. In Outlines of Economics (1923), Richard T. Ely and his coauthors argued that whether a public service should be provided gratuitously depends upon factors including its social benefit, the fairness of financing it through taxation, whether free provision would encourage wasteful consumption, and its broader economic effects.

Governments often provide services that are technically free of charge to the specific recipient. As Ely explained, "we have a large and heterogeneous group of industries which are maintained principally for service for their educational and developmental influence not primarily for regulation and not at all for profit but for the public good", including "not only schools and educational institutions of all kinds but roads and canals the savings banks and public pawn shops maintained in several countries of continental Europe workingmen's insurance and model manufacturing establishments such as France maintains for the production of tapestries and fine porcelains". Ely describes obtaining revenue from these activities as "almost a negligible consideration", providing a framework for determining whether these services should be provided free of charge based on their net social effect and on how broadly they are used, noting that "if only a small portion of the community enjoys the service it would usually be unjust to charge less than cost because the deficit would be borne by general taxation falling upon the entire community unless indeed the benefit to one restricted class is seen to be of advantage to the whole community". Ely concludes:

Assuming that the service benefits the whole community this is still not sufficient to justify a charge less than the cost of production. The problem is one of comparative costs We must inquire whether greater benefit would not be secured by charging enough to raise a profit and then distributing that profit through the maintenance of some other gratuitous enterprise or if the tax system weighs heavily on the poor by remitting taxation to the extent of the profit. If all these questions are answered in favor of the gratuity principle we still must con sider what effect gratuitous service will have upon the cost of the service. Will it encourage wastefulness? Free city water for example would probably prove impracticable because of waste but free parks or free education do not lead to inordinate or unnecessary consumption. The question is a vital one but it is not always to be answered one way as some critics seem to believe. Closely related to the above is the question of pauperization. Some things the State may safely give away and some not. The modern city for example may give free band concerts in our view to the undoubted edification of the community but in Rome the public games demoralized the populace. Finally we have to ask what effect gratuitous service will have on incomes. Henry George proposed that our cities should operate the street car lines gratuitously and the argument in its favor is far stronger than might be expected on first thought. But what effect would this gratuitous service have upon the incomes of the laboring classes. Take the case of the worker in New York City earning 5.00 a day. Will his wages remain at 5.00 if street car service is offered free of charge. Will not the migration to New York be increased so that wages will fall. And may not the gain ultimately fall to owners of house property in the form of enhanced rents.

Things being given away for free can lead to a free-rider problem, a type of market failure that occurs when those who benefit from resources, public goods and common-pool resources do not pay for them or under-pay. Free riders may overuse common pool resources by not paying for them, neither directly through fees or tolls, nor indirectly through taxes. Consequently, the common pool resource may be under-produced, overused, or degraded. Additionally, despite evidence that people tend to be cooperative by nature (a prosocial behaviour), the presence of free-riders has been shown to cause cooperation to deteriorate, perpetuating the free-rider problem.

== Business ==
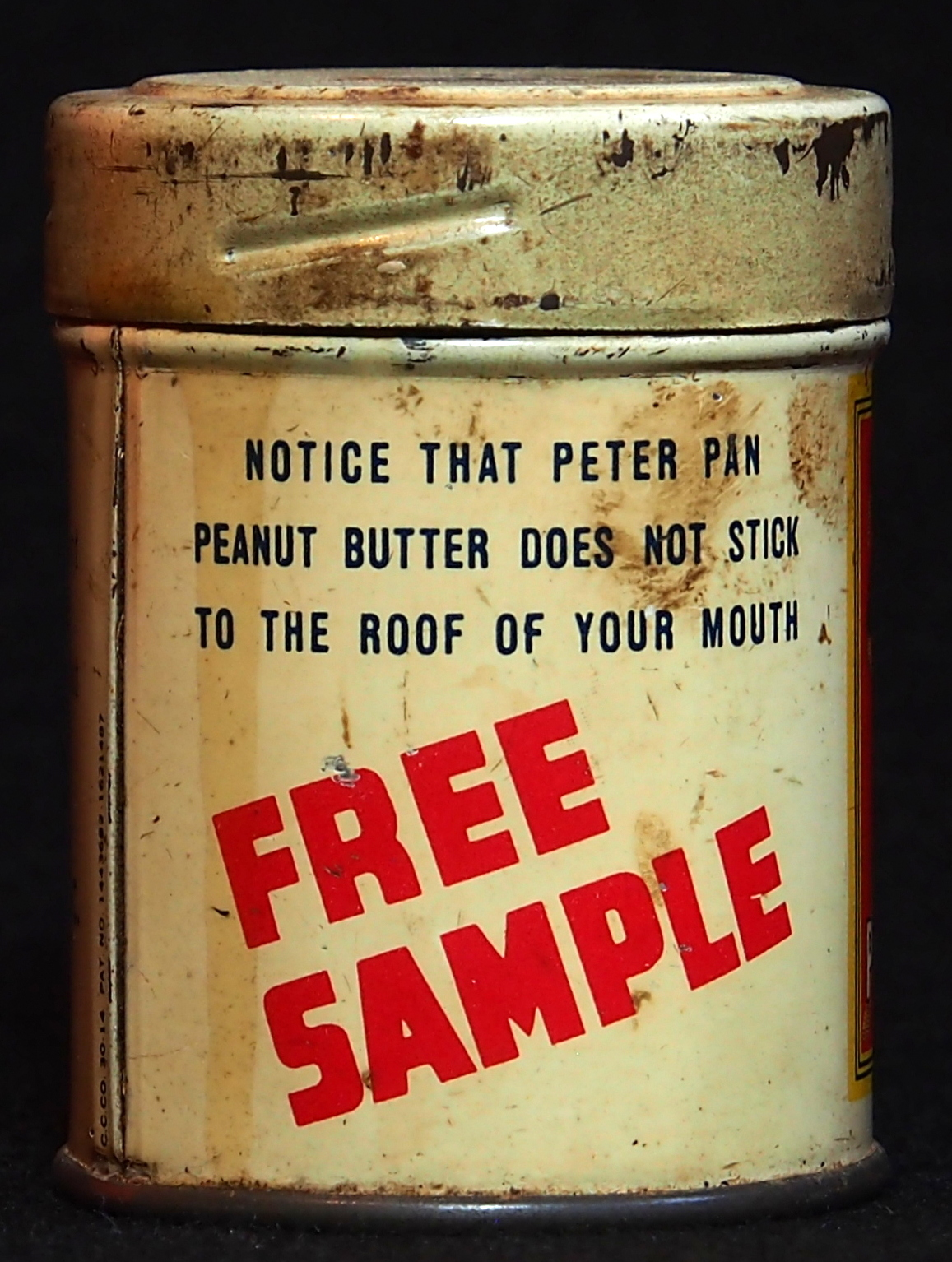
Free sample of Peter Pan peanut butter, promising it "does not stick to the roof of your mouth"

Businesses often provide some things for free to induce immediate or future purchases. For example, a product sample is a sample of a consumer product often given to the consumer free of charge so that they may try a product before committing to a purchase. When it comes to marketing non-durable commodities, such as food items, sampling is crucial. It gives room to highlight new items on the market as well as to bring back classic product categories with fresh tastes, inventive ingredients, and other changes. Similarly, a buy one, get one free sales promotion proposes that if a customer buys one of a thing, a second one will be provided free of charge, although this could also be interpreted as functionally providing a 50% discount on each of the two items on the condition that two are bought. Other things are provided for free because they are necessary accompaniments to purchased goods or services, and are themselves worth less than the cost of having a system in place to charge for them. For example, dine-in restaurants usually provide napkins free of charge. Because customers often consume more of goods made available without direct charge, businesses may attempt to limit waste while continuing to provide them free of charge. In the early 2000s, many fast-food restaurants began reducing the size and weight of napkins, replacing self-service dispensers with controlled dispensers, or distributing napkins only upon request, after finding that customers frequently took more than they needed. Restaurant operators and paper manufacturers estimated that controlled dispensing could reduce napkin consumption by approximately 30 percent.

Many businesses provide goods and services free of charge as part of a customer loyalty program or promotional program designed to encourage future purchases. Casinos, for example, commonly provide "comps", complimentary drinks, meals, hotel accommodations, entertainment, transportation, and other amenities to patrons based on the amount and duration of their gambling. Such benefits are generally awarded according to the expected long-term value of customers, rather than the direct cost of the complimentary item itself.

Businesses also frequently provide goods or services free of charge following a service failure, as part of service recovery, the organization's resolution of problems from dissatisfied customers, thereby converting those customers into loyal customers. Restaurants, hotels, airlines, retailers, and other businesses may remove defective items from a customer's bill or provide other complimentary products or services in an effort to restore customer satisfaction and retain future business. Marketing researchers have identified a phenomenon known as the service recovery paradox wherein a customer thinks more highly of a company after the company has corrected a problem that occurred with their service, compared to how they would regard the company if no problem with the service had occurred, increasing the assurance and confidence from the customer.

== Law ==
=== Property value of "free" things ===
Regarding the criminality of stealing something given away free of charge, in the 1999 New York case of People v. Cain, the New York City Criminal Court concluded that the question of whether something given away for free could, in fact, be stolen, was for the jury to decide. In that case, defendants "stole more than 50 copies of the 'New York Blade News' from a sidewalk street box", and after being charged with petit larceny, argued "that the newspapers are not 'property' because they are provided to the public free of charge". The court found that under the laws of New York, property included "any article, substance or thing of value", and did not generally require that such property be available only at a charge. The court concluded "[d]efendants' real, but unarticulated, argument is that they could not have stolen the newspapers because they are provided gratis to the public. This argument does not address facial sufficiency, but raises a triable issue of fact". Similarly, in the 1994 California case of Coming Up, Inc. v. City and County of San Francisco, where police officers had confiscated all copies of a freely distributed newspaper, the United States District Court for the Northern District of California noted that "First Amendment protection does not depend on whether the paper is distributed for free".

=== Competition law ===
A business giving away products or services free of charge may also run afoul of competition law, as this activity could be interpreted as a form of predatory pricing, a commercial pricing strategy which involves reducing the retail prices to a level lower than competitors to eliminate competition and create a monopoly. For a period of time, the prices are set unrealistically low to ensure competitors are unable to effectively compete with the dominant firm without suffering a substantial loss. The aim is to force existing or potential competitors within the industry to abandon the market so that the dominant firm may establish a stronger market position and create further barriers to entry. Once competition has been driven from the market, consumers are forced into a monopolistic market where the dominant firm can safely increase prices to recoup its losses.

The critical difference between predatory pricing and other market strategies is the potential for consumer harm in the long-term. Despite the initial buyer's market created through firms' competing for consumer preference, as the price war favors the dominant firm, consumers will be forced to accept fewer options and higher prices for the same goods and services in the monopolistic market. The dominant participant's drop in price forces the market price for those goods or services to readjust to this lower price, putting smaller firms and industry entrants at risk of exiting the industry. The principle behind this strategy is that, unlike new entrants and current players, the dominant firm has the size and capital to sustain short-term loss in profits, thus forcing a game of survival that the dominant firm is likely to win. The second stage is the recoupment, during which the dominant firm readjusts its product and service prices to approach monopoly prices (or a monopoly price, depending on remaining industry players and the dominant firm's market share) to recover its losses in the long-term. This price adjustment can put consumers under pressure, as they are now forced to accept the higher price without any fair-priced competition, thus resulting in consumer harm. This is what differentiates predatory pricing from normal competitive pricing. Under EU law, the European Commission can account for recoupment as a factor when determining whether predatory pricing is abusive. This is because predatory pricing can only be considered economically effective if a firm can recover its short-term losses from pricing below the average variable cost (AVC). However, recoupment is not a precondition for establishing whether predatory pricing is an abuse of dominance under Article 102 TFEU. Assessing other factors, such as barriers to entry, can suffice in demonstrating how predatory pricing can lead to foreclosure of competitors from the market.

The use of predatory pricing to gain a foothold in a market in one territory while maintaining high prices in the suppliers' home market (also known as "dumping") creates a risk that the loss-making product will find its way back to the home market and drive down prices there. This can result in negative effects on the home market and cause harm to domestic supplies and producers. Due to this, countries often have laws and regulations to prevent dumping and other forms of predatory pricing strategies that may distort trade.

A similar concern regarding competition arises with product bundling, offering several products or services for sale as one combined product or service package, which can be presented to consumers as inclusion of a free product with the purchase of a different product. It is a common feature in many imperfectly competitive product and service markets. A noted example is Microsoft's inclusion of its Internet Explorer web browser with the purchase of its operating system, a practice that gave the company a substantial advantage over sellers of competing web browsers.

== Software ==
Free of charge software is often called "free as in beer" in the world of software, due to the important distinction between that and "free as in freedom" libre software.
