= Workplace revenge =

Type of workplace bullying

Workplace revenge, or workplace retaliation, refers to purposeful retaliation by one employee against another within an organizational setting. It typically involves a power imbalance—the retaliator usually holds more power than the victim—and is often used to silence the victim and avoid accountability for workplace bullying, workplace harassment, or other misconduct in the workplace. Retaliation, legally, refers to actions taken as punishment for legally permitted behaviors: disciplinary actions taken by employers in reaction to behaviors that are counter to applicable laws or to established institutional policies are permitted as part of the employer's ability to control the work environment.

== Retaliation: work-related vs. social ==
Acts of retaliation within an organization can be categorized in two ways: work-related retaliation and social retaliation. "Work retaliation victimization involves adverse work-related actions that have the purpose or effect of negatively altering the target’s job and that are intended by the instigator or perceived by the target to be a reprisal for the target’s behavior." This categorization of workplace revenge concerns work-related actions that are often tangible, formal, and documented in employment records. Examples include termination, demotion, poor performance appraisal, and cutting hours.

On the other hand, "social retaliation victimization involves antisocial behaviors that have the purpose or effect of negatively altering the target’s interpersonal relations with other organizational members and that are intended by the instigator or perceived by the target to be a reprisal for the target’s behavior." This type of retaliatory action refers to behaviors between members of an organization, both verbal and nonverbal, that often go undocumented. Examples of this type include harassment, insulting, blame, threats, or the "silent treatment." These acts of workplace revenge have the purpose of negatively altering the victim's interpersonal relations with other organizational members as well as potentially affecting work productivity. However, a trust gap persists regarding these behaviors. Nearly one-third of employees expressed skepticism that their employers would remain neutral or protect them from retaliation during an investigation. This fear of retaliation remains a primary reason that employees choose not to report.

== Retaliation as a form of justice ==
An employee might seek justice in response to workplace revenge. The concept of organizational justice has been defined in three categories:

- distributive justice concerns the outcome of allocation, based on equality, equity, power, need, or responsibility. An example of this is the perceived fairness of distribution of tasks within an organization.
- procedural justice is the way in which individuals perceive the fairness of procedures that result from a decision process within an organization. An example would include ample advance notice of job related changes directly affecting the employee.
- interactional justice is the representation of behaviors associated with fairness of treatment by members within an organization, whether the interaction is between superiors to subordinates or among members of similar status.

In order to receive justice, an employee may 'retaliate' against unfair treatment by an employer, either through legal means such as filing a lawsuit or engaging in whistle-blowing to publicize illegal or inappropriate conduct by the employer, or through illegal means. To prove retaliation legally, an employee must prove that they participated in a protected activity, their employer took adverse action against them, and they suffered harm as a result of the adverse employment action.

== Revenge as a coping strategy ==
The two common responses to one's unjust behavior are forgiveness and revenge. When one perceives he has been the victim of unjust behavior, he will evaluate the situation and select the appropriate coping response for the negative experience. If the victim views the situation with anger and resentment, he chooses revenge as the next necessary step. On the opposite side, if the victim is able to let go of the negative emotions attached to the circumstances, he will choose forgiveness. Individuals are more likely to forgive a transgressor if they avoid holding the transgressor accountable for the offense and if the transgressor is apologetic.

== See also ==
- Going postal
- Organizational retaliatory behavior
- Workplace bullying
- Workplace incivility
- Workplace violence
