= Counterproductive work behavior =

Employee behavior that goes against the legitimate interests of an organization

Counterproductive work behavior (CWB) is employee's behavior that goes against the legitimate interests of an organization. This behavior can harm the organization, other people within it, and other people and organizations outside it, including employers, other employees, suppliers, clients, patients and citizens. It has been proposed that a person-by-environment interaction (the relationship between a person's psychological and physical capacities and the demands placed on those capacities by the person's social and physical environment.) can be utilized to explain a variety of counterproductive behaviors. For instance, an employee who is high on trait anger (tendency to experience anger) is more likely to respond to a stressful incident at work (e.g., being treated rudely by a supervisor) with CWB.

Some researchers use the CWB term to subsume related constructs that are distinct:

- Workplace deviance is behavior at work that violates norms for appropriate behavior.
- Retaliation consists of harmful behaviors done by employees to get back at someone who has treated them unfairly.
- Workplace revenge are behaviors by employees intended to hurt another person who has done something harmful to them.
- Workplace aggression consists of harmful acts that harm others in organizations.

== Dimensional models ==
Several typologies of CWB exist.

Using the term deviance (behavior that violates accepted norms), Robinson and Bennett created a four-class typology of CWBs, dividing them into the following dimensions:

- production deviance, involving behaviors like leaving early, intentionally working slowly, or taking long breaks;
- property deviance, involving sabotage of equipment, theft of property, and taking kickbacks;
- political deviance, involving showing favoritism, revenge, gossiping, or blaming others;
- personal aggression, involving harassment, verbal abuse, and endangerment

A five-dimension typology of CWB:

- abuse against others
- production deviance
- sabotage
- theft
- withdrawal

An 11-dimension typology of CWB:

- theft of property
- destruction of property
- misuse of information
- misuse of time and resources
- unsafe behavior
- poor attendance
- poor quality of work
- alcohol use
- drug use
- inappropriate verbal action
- inappropriate physical action

A two-dimensional model of CWBs distinguished by organizational versus person target has gained considerable acceptance. Additional dimensions have been proposed for research purposes, including a legal v. illegal dimension, a hostile v. instrumental aggression dimension, and a task-related v. a non-task-related dimension. CWBs that violate criminal law may have different antecedents than milder forms of CWBs. Similarly, instrumental aggression (i.e., aggression with a deliberate goal in mind) may have different antecedents than those CWBs caused by anger.

== Assessment ==
CWB is generally assessed with questionnaires completed by the target employee or by another source, such as a coworker or a supervisor. Several scales have been developed to assess overall CWB as well as subdimensions. The two most often used are the Bennett and Robinson deviance scale that assesses organization-directed and person-directed deviance and the Counterproductive Work Behavior Checklist, CWB-C that can assess the five dimensions noted above.

== Dimensions ==
=== Absenteeism ===
Absenteeism is typically measured by time lost (number of days absent) measures and frequency (number of absence episodes) measures. It is weakly linked to affective predictors such as job satisfaction and commitment. Absences fit into two types of categories. Excused absences are those due to personal or family illness; unexcused absences include an employee who does not come to work in order to do another preferred activity or neglects to call in to a supervisor. Absence can be linked to job dissatisfaction. Major determinants of employee absence include employee affect, demographic characteristics, organizational absence culture, and organization absence policies. Absence due to non-work obligations is related to external features of a job with respect to dissatisfaction with role conflict, role ambiguity, and feelings of tension. Absences due to stress and illness are related to internal and external features of the job, fatigue and gender. Research has found that women are more likely to be absent than men, and that the absence-control policies and culture of an organization will predict absenteeism.

=== Abuse against others ===
Physical acts of aggression by members of an organization, committed in organizational settings are considered as workplace violence. While most researchers examine overall workplace aggression, there is a line of research that separates workplace aggression according to its targets, whether interpersonal or organizational. In this model of workplace aggression, trait anger and interpersonal conflict have been found to be significant predictors of interpersonal aggression, while interpersonal conflict, situational constraints, and organizational constraints have been found to be predictors of organizational aggression. Other factors significantly linked to aggression are sex and trait anger, with men and individuals with higher levels of trait anger showing more aggressive behaviors.

=== Bullying ===
Workplace bullying consists of progressive and systematic mistreatment of one employee by another. It may include verbal abuse, gossiping, social exclusion, or the spreading of rumors. The terms "bullying" and "mobbing" are sometimes used interchangeably, but "bullying" is more often used to refer to lower levels of antisocial behavior that do not include workgroup participation. The costs of bullying include losses in productivity, higher absenteeism, higher turnover rates, and legal fees when the victims of bullying sue the organization. Reported incidence of bullying is ambiguous with rates being reported from under 3% to over 37% depending on the method used to gather incidence statistics. The strongest factor predicting bullying behavior seems to be exposure to incidents of bullying. This suggests that bullying is a cascading problem that needs to be curtailed in its earliest stages. In addition to exposure to incidents of bullying, being male also seems to increase the likelihood that one will engage in bullying behavior. It is proposed that the human resources function can provide guidance in the mitigation of bullying behavior by taking an active role in identifying and stopping the behaviors.

=== Cyber loafing ===
Cyber loafing can be defined as surfing the web in any form of non-job-related tasks performed by the employee. Cyber loafing has emerged as more and more people use computers at work. One survey showed that 64% of US workers use the Internet for personal tasks at work. It has been suggested that cyber-loafing is responsible for a 30–40% decrease in employee productivity and was estimated to have cost US businesses $5.3 billion in 1999.

=== Incivility ===
Workplace incivility is disrespectful and rude behavior in violation of workplace norms for respect." The effects of incivility include increased competitiveness, increases in sadistic behavior, and inattentiveness. A study of cyber incivility showed that higher levels of incivility are associated with lower job satisfaction, lower organizational commitment, and higher turnover rates. Two factors that seem to be associated with becoming a victim of incivility are low levels of agreeableness and high levels of neuroticism. The affective events theory suggests that individuals who experience more incidents of incivility may be more sensitive to these behaviors and therefore more likely to report them.

=== Counterproductive knowledge behavior ===
Counterproductive knowledge behavior (CKB) refers to employees' actions impeding organizational knowledge flows. Seven categories of counterproductive knowledge behaviors have been recognized: disengagement from knowledge sharing, knowledge sharing ignorance, partial knowledge sharing, knowledge hoarding, counter-knowledge sharing, knowledge hiding and knowledge sabotage. Categories differ in terms of their negative impact on an organization.

==== Counter-knowledge sharing ====
Counter-knowledge sharing is employee behavior, where employees share disinformation and misconceptions based on unverified information. Some examples of this unverified information include rumors, gossip, false beliefs, and unsupportable explanations and justifications. Employees may acquire counter-knowledge unwittingly.

==== Knowledge hoarding ====
Knowledge hoarding is the accumulation of knowledge by employees while concealing the fact that they possess this knowledge.

In other words, it means the accumulation of knowledge that may or may not be shared later, but usually is not. Knowledge hoarding can also happen when someone collects information for themselves but does not think that others could benefit from it. Thus, knowledge hoarding is not necessarily intentional, but it may cause the risk of counterproductive behaviour.

Knowledge hoarding is a problem when the transfer and integration of knowledge would create value for the organisation, but individuals prefer to pursue self-interested outcomes through hoarding. Even when the knowledge acquired during working belongs to the organisation rather than the worker, some individuals perceive it as their personal property. That usually takes place due to "knowledge is power" syndrome in organisations.

Knowledge hoarding reduces the worth of the knowledge asset by preventing its widest utilisation. Therefore, it is usually associated with negative organisational outcomes, such as weakened unit performance and work-related interactions. For example, when knowledge hoarding is perceived by colleagues as uncooperative, it may lead to difficult relationships in the workplace. It may also impair employees' equal access to that resource, which causes injustice.

On the other hand, knowledge hoarding may be due to there being no proper platform for information sharing. Therefore, the managerial level and knowledge management should attempt to break the hoarding cycle by creating new models for interaction and knowledge sharing. Also, a friendly and cooperative work environment could potentially reduce knowledge hoarding as counterproductive work behaviour and even contribute to knowledge sharing.

==== Knowledge hiding ====
Knowledge hiding is defined as the intentional attempts of employees to conceal their knowledge when their colleagues request it. Knowledge hiding is a deliberate action to withhold or conceal information from other employees in the organization. Knowledge hiding might influence negatively into the organization's knowledge exchange, reduce efficiency and cause a lack of trust into the organization. Factors that might cause knowledge hiding are for example: leadership, workspace stressors, personality traits and psychological ownership.

There are three categories for knowledge hiding: evasive hiding, playing dumb and rationalized hiding. Rationalized hiding happens when an employee explains the reasons behind non-delivered knowledge. This involves a justification for missing knowledge. Playing dumb occurs when an employee pretends that they do not have the discussed knowledge or they ignore relevant information available for them. Evasive hiding occurs when an employee postpones knowledge delivery or when they deliver less information than discussed.

Knowledge hiding limits productive knowledge transfer in organizations, harms organizational functioning, limits the organization's performance, creativity, growth and effectiveness. At the individual level, knowledge hiding causes distrust and isolates employees from mutual idea exchange. In some cases, knowledge hiding might actually enhance the relationships between colleagues. Knowledge sharing is an important asset from an organizational perspective, but knowledge hiding might actually lead to positive outcomes. Rationalized and evasive knowledge hiding might cause short-term victories and enhance innovative job performance. Evasive hiding does have a negative outcome on in-role performance.

Organizational work culture has a large effect on knowledge hiding and sharing in organizations. Organizations that promote ethical work culture, employee trustworthiness and knowledge sharing reduce their knowledge hiding. Employees might feel psychological ownership over knowledge as they see the knowledge as their personal property. Therefore they want to defend their territory and hide the knowledge.

Knowledge hiding can be prevented with a supportive organizational work culture. Management can prevent knowledge hiding by giving active encouragement to the employees and by creating a collaborative, open and discussion-oriented workplace. New employees should be taught that knowledge hiding leads to negative outcomes and does not benefit the organization, nor the employee themselves. Knowledge sharing should be rewarded and supported in the organization by the management. Management can motivate employees by giving recognition to knowledge sharing employees, give them financial support and give credit to the employees for their ideas. Employees should also be encouraged to attend conferences, publish papers and submit their patentable ideas. Management should then take this into consideration when promoting employees into senior titles or other forms of career progression. Knowledge hiding can be prevented with a knowledge sharing supporting attitude from the management and by rewarding knowledge sharing employees.

==== Knowledge sabotage ====
Knowledge sabotage is considered the most extreme form of counterproductive knowledge behavior. It is an incident when an employee (i.e., the saboteur) intentionally provides wrong knowledge (information, advice, a document, or a recommendation) to another employee (the target). The saboteur can also hide it from another employee. Knowledge saboteur acts intentionally, is aware of the employee's need for knowledge, has the required knowledge, which is important for the employee and knows that the employee could productively apply the required knowledge to work-related tasks.

Knowledge sabotage instances can be categorized as reactive or proactive. This depends on the target's behavior and whether they ask for the required knowledge. The reactive form of knowledge sabotage occurs when the knowledge is asked for. The proactive action occurs when there is no request for the knowledge, but the saboteur is aware of the target's need for the certain knowledge. In both situations the saboteur decides to act counterproductively by lying or sharing incorrect knowledge or by concealing critical knowledge from the person who would benefit from the resource.

Knowledge saboteurs only rarely act against their organization on purpose; instead, they are driven by inter-employee conflict, personality traits, and personality disorders. Despite this, it has negative consequences on organizational level such as time waste, failed or delayed projects, lost clients, unnecessary expenses, hiring costs, understaffing or poor quality of products and services. Thus, these consequences are often unintentional when saboteurs are driven by other motivators than harming the organization. Many of the motivational drivers concerns people's urge to share critical information with their colleagues. Sharing information can be perceived as undermining one's own position or, for example, people do not want to share information due to personal chemistry. Organizational culture also plays a big role in how much information sabotage occurs and how eager people are to help each other. For example, a work culture that puts employees in a competitive position against each other contributes to the occurrence of information sabotage.

=== Lateness ===
Lateness is described as arriving at work later or leaving earlier than required. Problems associated with lateness include compromised organizational efficiency. Late employees responsible for critical tasks can negatively affect organizational production. Other workers may experience psychological effects of the tardy employee including morale and motivational problems as they attempt to "pick up the slack."

=== Production deviance ===
Production deviance is ineffective job performance that is done on purpose, such as doing tasks incorrectly or withholding of effort. Such behaviors can be seen in disciplinary actions and safety violations.

=== Sabotage ===
Employee sabotage are behaviors that can "damage or disrupt the organization's production, damaging property, the destruction of relationships, or the harming of employees or customers." Research has shown that often acts of sabotage or acts of retaliation are motivated by perceptions of organizational injustice and performed with the intention of causing harm to the target.

Michael Crino was investigating the causes of sabotage as early as 1994. He found that the ways in which sabotage is carried out are extensive but they have the same elements. Sabotage has been intentionally caused and is intended to interfere with the normal operation of the company.

==== Service ====
Service sabotage originated from counter-productive behavior literature. Lloyd C. Harris and Emmanuel Ogbonna from Cardiff University drew from employee deviance and dysfunctional behaviors studies to conceptualize service sabotage as a disturbing phenomenon in the work place. Service sabotage refer to organizational member behaviors that are intentionally designed negatively to affect service. Empirical evidence suggested that more than 90% employees accept that service sabotage is an everyday occurrence in their organization.

=== Sexual harassment ===
Sexual harassment is defined as "unwelcome sexual advances, requests for sexual favors, and other verbal or physical contact when (a) submission to the conduct by the employee is either explicitly or implicitly a term or condition of an individual's employment, (b) submission to or rejection of such conduct by an individual is used as a basis for employment decisions affecting the individual and/or (c) such conduct [that] has the purpose or effect of unreasonably interfering with work performance, or creating an intimidating, hostile or offensive working environment." (Equal Employment Opportunity Commission, 1980)

=== Substance abuse ===
Substance abuse by employees at work is a problem that can have an effect on work attendance, performance, and safety and can lead to other injuries outside of work and health problems.

=== Theft ===
Employee theft is defined as employees taking things not belonging to them from an organization. Employee theft is estimated to account for billions of dollars of loss globally each year, with employees accounting for more theft than customers. This may include large embezzlements or the pilfering of pencils and paperclips, but the losses in the aggregate are substantial. At least one study suggests that 45% of companies experience financial fraud, with average losses of $1.7 million. Factors such as conscientiousness have been shown to be negatively related to theft behaviors. Many organizations use integrity tests during the initial screening process for new employees in an effort to eliminate those considered most likely to commit theft. Causes of employee theft include characteristics of the individual and environmental conditions such as frustrating and unfair working conditions.

=== Turnover ===
Turnover is when employees leave the organization, either voluntarily (quitting) or involuntarily (being fired or laid off). Research on voluntary employee job turnover has attempted to understand the causes of individual decisions to leave an organization. It has been found that lower performance, lack of reward contingencies for performance, and better external job opportunities are the main causes. Other variables related to turnover are conditions in the external job market and the availability of other job opportunities, and length of employee tenure. Turnover can be optimal as when a poorly performing employee decides to leave an organization, or dysfunctional when the high turnover rates increase the costs associated with recruitment and training of new employees, or if good employees consistently decide to leave. Avoidable turnover is when the organization could have prevented it and unavoidable turnover is when the employee's decision to leave could not be prevented. The satisfaction–turnover relationship is affected by alternative job prospects. If an employee accepts an unsolicited job offer, job dissatisfaction was less predictive of turnover because the employee more likely left in response to "pull" (the lure of the other job) than "push" (the unattractiveness of the current job). Similarly, job dissatisfaction is more likely to translate into turnover when other employment opportunities are plentiful.

=== Withdrawal ===
Employee withdrawal consists of behaviors such as absence, lateness, and ultimately job turnover. Absence and lateness has attracted research as they disrupt organizational production, deliveries and services. Unsatisfied employees withdraw in order to avoid work tasks or pain, and remove themselves from their jobs. Withdrawal behavior may be explained as employee retaliation against inequity in the work setting. Withdrawal may also be part of a progressive model and relate to job dissatisfaction, job involvement, and organizational commitment.

== Notable behavior exclusions ==
CWBs are "active and volitional acts engaged in by individuals, as opposed to accidental or unintentional actions." CWBs, therefore do not include acts that lack volition, such as the inability to successfully complete a task. Nor do CWBs include involvement in an accident, although purposeful avoidance of the safety rules that may have led to the accident would represent a CWB.

The U.S. Department of Health and Human Services (2002) estimates the cost of accidents to organizations to be $145 million annually. Most research on this topic has attempted to evaluate characteristics of the workplace environment that lead to accidents and determination of ways to avoid accidents. There has also been some research on the characteristics of accident-prone employees that has found they are typically younger, more distractible, and less socially adjusted than other employees. Recent research has shown that an organization's safety climate has been associated with lower accident involvement, compliance with safety procedures, and increased proactive safety behaviors.

Another set of behaviors that do not fit easily into the accepted definition of CWBs, are those described as unethical pro-organizational behaviors (UPBs). UPBs represent illegitimate means intended to further the legitimate interests of an organization. UPBs are not necessarily intended to harm the organization, although the UPBs may result in adverse consequences to the organization, such as a loss of trust and goodwill, or in criminal charges against the organization. In law enforcement, UPBs are exhibited in a form of misconduct called noble cause corruption. Noble cause corruption occurs when a police officer violates the law or ethical rules in order to reduce crime or the fear of crime. An example of this is testilying, in which a police officer commits perjury to obtain the conviction of a defendant. UPBs have not received the same attention from researchers that CWBs have received.

== Organizational citizenship behavior ==
Counterproductive work behavior and organizational citizenship behavior (OCB), which consists of behaviors that help organizations but go beyond required tasks, have been studied together and are generally found to be related in that individuals who do one are unlikely to do the other.

== Current research topics and trends ==
By definition, counterproductive work behaviors are voluntary acts that are detrimental to an organization. They have important implications for the well-being of an organization. Theft alone is estimated to cause worldwide losses in the billions of dollars each year. These estimated losses do not include losses from other sources, nor do they consider the fact that many losses attributable to CWBs go undetected.

The consequences of CWBs and their persistence in the workplace have led to increased attention being given to the study of such behaviors. Current trends in industrial organizational psychology suggest a continuing increase in the study of CWBs. Research into CWBs appears to fall into three broad categories: (1) classification of CWBs; (2) predicting counterproductive behaviors; and (3) furthering the theoretical framework of CWBs.

A review of peer reviewed journals following this article shows the broad interest in CWBs. A brief list of noted journals includes The International Journal of Selection and Assessment, The Journal of Applied Psychology, Computers in Human Behavior, Personality and Individual Differences, Occupational Health Psychology, Human Resource Management Review, Military Justice, Criminal Justice Ethics, European Journal of Work and Organizational Psychology, and International Journal of Nursing Studies. The variety of journals reporting in the area of CWBs reflects the breadth of the topic and the global interest in studying these behaviors.

Researchers use many sources in attempting to measure CWBs. These include potentially subjective measures such as self-reports, peer reports, and supervisor reports. More objective methods for assessing CWBs include disciplinary records, absentee records, and job performance statistics. Each of these methods present potential problems in the measurement of CWBs. For example, self-reports always have the potential for bias with individuals trying to cast themselves in a good light. Self-reports may also cause problems for researchers when they measure what an incumbent 'can-do' and what an incumbent 'will-do.' Peer and supervisor reports can suffer from personal bias, but they also suffer from lack of knowledge of the private behaviors of the job incumbent whose behavior is being studied. Archival records suffer from lack of information about the private behaviors of incumbents, providing instead information about instances where incumbents are caught engaging in CWBs. Some researchers have proposed a differential detection hypothesis which predicts that there will be discrepancies between reports of detected CWBs and other reports of CWBs.

The lack of accurate measures for CWBs jeopardizes the ability of researchers to find the relationships between CWB and other factors they are evaluating. The primary criticism of research in CWBs has been that too much of the research relies on a single-source method of measurement relying primarily on self-reports of counterproductive work behavior. Several studies have therefore attempted to compare self-reports with other forms of evidence about CWBs. These studies seek to determine whether different forms of evidence converge, or effectively measure the same behaviors. Convergence has been established between self-reports and peer and supervisor reports for interpersonal CWBs but not organizational CWBs. This finding is significant because it promotes the ability of researchers to use multiple sources of evidence in evaluating CWBs.

== Correlates, predictors, moderators and mediators ==
=== Affect ===
Affect or emotion at work, especially the experience of negative emotions like anger or anxiety, predict the likelihood of counterproductive work behaviors occurring. Affective personality traits, the tendency for individuals to experience emotions, can also predict CWB. For example, employees with high negative affectivity, the tendency to experience negative emotions, typically display more counterproductive work behaviors than those with positive affectivity, the tendency to experience positive emotions.

=== Age ===
Age appears to be an important factor in predicting CWBs. While age does not appear to be strongly related to core task performance, creativity, or performance in training, it does appear to be positively related to organizational citizenship behaviors and negatively related to CWBs. Older employees seem to exhibit less aggression, tardiness, substance abuse, and voluntary absenteeism (although sickness related absenteeism is somewhat higher than younger employees). Some researchers argue that the lower rate of CWBs may be due to better self-regulation and self-control.

=== Cognitive ability ===
Research into the relationship between cognitive ability and CWBs is contradictory. When CWBs are operationalized as disciplinary records of detected CWBs, a strong negative relationship between cognitive ability has been found. This relationship did not hold, however, when cognitive ability was operationalized as educational attainment. A longitudinal study of adolescents through young adulthood found that, among those individuals who exhibited conduct disorders as youths, high levels of cognitive ability were associated with higher levels of CWBs, a positive relationship. Other research has found that general mental ability is largely unrelated to self-reports of CWBs including theft (although a weak link to incidents of lateness was detected). In the same study, grade point average showed a stronger relationship to CWBs. Contradictions in the findings may be explained in the differential effects between measures of cognitive ability and self-reported versus detected incidents of CWBs.

=== Emotional intelligence ===
Emotional intelligence (EI) has been defined as the ability to identify and manage emotional information in oneself and others and focus energy on required behaviors. The factors making up EI include:

- appraisal and expression of emotion in self
- appraisal and recognition of emotions in others
- regulation of emotions, and
- use of emotions.

To the extent that EI includes the ability to manage emotions, it might be expected that it will have an influence on CWBs similar to that found for self-control. Research in this area is limited, however, one study looking for the moderating effects of EI on the relationships between distributive justice, procedural justice, and interactional justice failed to find a significant moderating effect in any of these relationships.

=== Interpersonal conflict ===
Interpersonal conflict in the workplace can also lead to counterproductive work behaviors. Interpersonal conflict with the supervisor can lead to counterproductive work behaviors such as defiance, undermining, and colluding with coworkers to engage in deviant behavior. Interpersonal conflict with peers can lead to counterproductive work behaviors such as harassment, bullying, and physical altercations.

=== Organizational constraints ===
Organizational constraints, the extent to which conditions at work interfere with job tasks, has been shown to relate to CWB so that jobs with high constraints have employees who engage in CWB. Not only do constraints lead to CWB, but CWB can lead to constraints. Employees who engage in CWB can find that constraints increase over time.

=== Organizational justice ===
Organizational justice or fairness perceptions have been shown to influence the display of counterproductive work behaviors. Distributive justice, procedural justice, and interactional justice have all been shown to include both counterproductive work behaviors aimed at individuals, such as political deviance and personal aggression; and counterproductive work behaviors aimed at the organization, such as production slowdown and property deviance.

Overall perceptions of unfairness may particularly elicit interpersonal counterproductive work behaviors such as political deviance and personal aggressions. Interpersonal justice and informational justice may also predict counterproductive work behaviors aimed at the supervisor, such as neglecting to follow supervisory instructions, acting rudely toward one's supervisor, spreading unconfirmed rumors about a supervisor, intentionally doing something to get one's supervisor in trouble, and encouraging coworkers to get back at one's supervisor.

=== Personality ===
Personality is a predictor of an employee's proclivity toward counterproductive work behaviors. With regard to the Big Five personality traits (conscientiousness, agreeableness, extroversion and openness to experience) all predict counterproductive behaviors. When an employee is low in conscientiousness, counterproductive work behaviors related to the organization are more likely to occur. Employees who are low in agreeableness will exhibit counterproductive work behaviors related to interpersonal deviant behaviors. Furthermore, in terms of greater specificity, for employees low in conscientiousness, sabotage and withdrawal are more likely to occur. For employees low in extraversion, theft is likely to occur. Finally, for employees high in openness to experience, production deviance is likely to occur. Moreover, personality disorders – in particular, dependent, narcissistic, and sadistic personality disorders – lead to counterproductive work behavior, including knowledge hiding and sabotage.

==== Narcissism ====
Employees with narcissistic personalities tend to exhibit more counterproductive work behaviors, especially when the workplace is stressful.

==== Psychopathy ====
According to Boddy, because of abusive supervision by corporate psychopaths, large amounts of anti-corporate feeling will be generated among the employees of the organisations that corporate psychopaths work in. This should result in high levels of counterproductive behaviour as employees give vent to their anger with the corporation, which they perceive to be acting through its corporate psychopathic managers in a way that is eminently unfair to them.

==== Self-control ====
Self-control has been evaluated as a significant explanation of CWBs. Like, conscientiousness, self-control, or internal control, is seen as a stable individual difference that tends to inhibit deviant behaviors. The identification of self-control as a factor in deviant behaviors flows from work in criminology, where self-control is seen as the strength of one's ability to avoid short-term gain for long-term costs. Using multiple regression analysis, one study compared the effects of 25 characteristics (including self-control, justicial factors, equity factors, positive affect, levels of autonomy, and a variety of other individual characteristics) on CWBs. The study showed that self-control was the best predictor of CWBs and that most of the other factors had negligible predictive value. Cognitive ability and age were among the remaining factors that showed some effect. These additional findings are consistent with research that tends to show older employees exercise a greater level of self-control.

==== Target personality ====
One line of research in CWBs looks not at the instigators of CWBs, but the victims' provocative target behavior, or the behaviors of the victims of CWBs, which are seen as potential mediating factors in the frequency and intensity of CWBs originated against them. This line of research suggests that low levels of agreeableness and conscientiousness, and high levels of neuroticism, in the victims of CWBs may lead to more incidents of CWBs, like incivility. The affective events theory has been used to explain that some individuals report being the victim of incivility more often because they are more sensitive to it than other workers.

== Peer reporting ==
Normative behavior within organizations tends to discourage workers from reporting the observed CWBs of their peers, although this tendency can be reduced when a group is punished for the CWBs of individual members. There are three factors that seem to be most influential on peer reporting of CWBs: the emotional closeness between the person exhibiting the CWBs and the person observing the CWBs; the severity of the misconduct observed, and the presence of witness. Peers are more likely to report the CWBs of colleagues when the conduct is severe, or when there are other witnesses present, and less likely to report CWBs when they are emotionally close to the person committing the CWBs. A key problem in the use of peer reports of CWBs instead of self-reports of CWBs is that peer reports only capture observed behaviors and are not able to identify CWBs committed secretly.

== Managing strategies ==
A substantial body of research has demonstrated that stable characteristics of individuals are associated with the likelihood of CWBs. Some examples of stable characteristics that have been demonstrated to have relationships with CWBs include conscientiousness and agreeableness, motivation avoidance, cognitive ability, and self-control. To the extent that these stable conditions predict CWBs, reduction of CWBs in an organization can begin at the recruitment and selection phase of new employees.

Integrity screening is one common form of screening used by organizations as is cognitive ability screening. Personality testing is also common in screening out individuals who may have a higher incidence of CWBs. Work samples have been found to be a more effective screening tool than integrity testing alone, but integrity testing and cognitive testing together are even better screening tools. While the use of screening instruments may be an imperfect decision-making tool, the question often facing the recruitment officer is not whether the instrument is perfect, but whether, relative to other available screening tools, the screening tool is functional.

However, organizations must do more than screen employees in order to successfully manage CWBs. Substantial research has demonstrated that CWBs arise out of situational factors that occur in the day-to-day operations of an organization, including organizational constraints, lack of rewards, illegitimate tasks, interpersonal conflicts, and lack of organizational justice. Research has shown that individuals who are treated unfairly are more likely to engage in CWBs. One major step that organizations can take to reduce the impetus for CWBs is therefore to enhance organizational justice. Maintaining communications and feedback, allowing participation of employees, and supervisory training are other suggestions for mitigating CWBs. Organizations must also pay close attention to employees for signs and sources of interpersonal conflicts so that they can be identified and tended to as necessary.

Combating CWBs comes with some costs, including the costs of selection, monitoring, and implementing preventive measures to reduce triggers for CWBs. Before undertaking costly measures to reduce CWBs, it may be worthwhile for an organization to identify the costs of CWBs. If the cost-benefit analysis does not show a savings, then the organization must decide whether the battle against CWBs is worth fighting. There is at least one set of researchers that suggest that production deviance (withholding effort) and withdrawal can be a benefit to employees by allowing them to relieve tension in certain circumstances.

== See also ==
- Cognitive resource theory
- Cyberslacking
- Employee silence
- Industrial and organizational psychology
- Machiavellianism in the workplace
- Malicious compliance
- Occupational burnout
- Passive–aggressive behavior
- Procrastination
- Quiet quitting
- Workplace harassment
- Anti-pattern
