= Tyler Thomas =

Tyler Thomas may refer to:

- Tyler Thomas (baseball) (born 1995)
- Tyler Thomas (basketball) (born 2000)
- Tyler Thomas (gridiron football) (born 1990)

== See also ==
- Thomas Tyler (disambiguation)
- Tyler Thompson
