= Fair procedure =

Common-law doctrine

Fair procedure is a common-law doctrine that arises from a line of groundbreaking decisions of the Supreme Court of California dating back to the 1880s. Certain types of private actors (especially professional associations, unions, hospitals, and insurance companies), due to their overwhelming economic power within certain fields, cannot arbitrarily expel members or employees or deny persons admission for no logical reason; they are obligated to provide a rudimentary form of procedural due process (in the form of notice and a hearing). It is contrasted against due process in that it applies to private actors, while due process normally applies only to state actors.

Damages for violating the right of fair procedure can be substantial. For example, the State Compensation Insurance Fund was found liable for $1,131,000 for arbitrarily denying a small medical clinic admission to its preferred provider network. But the right of fair procedure only applies where the conduct of the challenged private entity would destroy the plaintiff's right to practice a lawful trade or profession. Because it is possible (though slightly more difficult) to find gainful employment in the motion picture industry without being the holder of an Academy Award, the conduct of the guilds that determine eligibility for the Oscars is not subject to fair procedure.

Another limitation, of course, is that although the right of fair procedure (if applicable) clearly requires something slightly less than procedural due process, it does not require the affected party to be afforded more rights than would be available under procedural due process. Thus, when the plaintiff's professional association had clearly given him the benefit of far more procedural protections than he would have been entitled to from any government entity, he had received the benefit of fair procedure and had no cause of action for the mildly adverse action that resulted.

In the US, the existence of a separate doctrine of fair procedure for private actors is necessary because due process generally controls only decisions taken by state actors. In contrast, the broader UK doctrine of natural justice applies to both public and private entities.

== See also ==
- Procedural justice
