= Service recovery paradox =

Paradox in economics

The service recovery paradox (SRP) is a situation in which a customer thinks more highly of a company after the company has corrected a problem with their service, compared to how they would regard the company if non-faulty service had been provided. The main reason behind this thinking is that successful recovery of a faulty service increases the assurance and confidence from the customer.

For example, a traveller's flight is cancelled. When she calls the airline, they apologise and offer her another flight of her choice on the same day, and a discount voucher against future travel. Under the service recovery paradox, the traveller is now happier with the airline, and more loyal to it, than she would have been had no problem occurred.

Understanding SRP has been an important goal for both researchers and managers, as service failure is one of the main determinants of customer switching behavior and successful recovery from these failures is seen by some as critical for customer retention. Recovery is especially important for service providers for whom ensuring an error-free service is impossible.

== Background and history ==
The term service recovery paradox was first coined in 1992 by McCollough and Bharadwaj who described a situation when customers post-failure satisfaction exceeded pre-failure satisfaction. The service recovery paradox contends that effective service recovery can go beyond merely maintaining customer satisfaction, but can also elevate it to a higher level, winning customers and engendering long term customer loyalty. They defined it as "a situation in which a consumer has experienced a problem which has been satisfactory resolved, and where the consumer subsequently rates their satisfaction to be equal to or greater than that in which no problem had occurred".

Since the concept was introduced in the early 1990s, a number of empirical studies have sought to establish when and under what circumstances the paradox operates in practice. However, these studies report mixed findings.

Before the term Service Recovery Paradox was first used, the concept of service recovery was described by Hart, Hessket and Sasser in the following terms: "A good recovery can turn angry, frustrated customers into loyal ones. It can, in fact, create more goodwill than if things had gone smoothly in the first place”. It was also theorized that this concept could be used strategically to increase customer retention.

== Blame attribution ==
Service failures occur when service delivery falls short of customer expectations. Service failures are profoundly different to product failures in that service failures are far more personal with psychological outcomes. In the event of a service failure, customers will often seek to attribute blame. In attributing blame, customers typically consider three things:

- Locus: Who is responsible for the failure?
- Stability: How likely is the failure to recur?
- Controllability: Did the responsible party have control over the causes of the service failure?

Blame may be attributed to:

- the service organisation (system and personnel failures)
- external sources (e.g. weather, volcanic eruption)
- the customer who may have contributed, at least partially, to service failure

In the aftermath of service failure, dissatisfied customers have five major courses of action open to them:

- Do nothing – suffer in silence, but the service provider’s reputation may deteriorate with the dissatisfied segment
- Complain privately – by, for example, spreading negative word-of-mouth about the company or by writing about the negative experience on social media
- Complain - in some form to the service firm.
- Take some kind of overt action with a third party e.g. complain to a consumer claims tribunal, or even launch a legal action to obtain redress.
- Defect - simply not patronise the firm again—or spread negative word of mouth messages about the firm

Research consistently shows that customers who blame external factors are more forgiving. However, customers who blame the service system are more likely to complain. When customers complain directly to the service provider, there is an opportunity to turn customers around, increase their satisfaction and win loyal customers. For this reason, companies should develop strategies for handling service failures.

== Service recovery response types ==
Service recovery consists of all the actions taken to move a customer from a state of dissatisfaction to a state of satisfaction, following a service failure. In the event that a service failure occurs, the service organisation's response has the potential to either create or reinforce a strong customer relationship or change a minor incident into a major distraction. Hence, the way that organisations respond can have a bearing on winning customers in the long term.

Service failures can be categorised according to the following typology:

- Responses to service delivery system failures: failures in the core service offering of the firm.
- Responses to customer needs and requests: employee responses to individual consumer needs and special requests (whether implicit or explicit)
- Unprompted and unsolicited employee actions: events and employee behaviours, both good and bad, that are totally unexpected by the customer.
- Failures relating to problematic customers: instances where neither the staff nor the service organisation is at fault for the service failure

== Perceived justice ==
When consumers who have suffered as a result of service failures, seek redress, they are seeking some type of perceived justice defined as the process in which "consumers weigh their inputs against their outputs when forming recovery evaluations." Perceived justice consists of three components: distributive justice, procedural justice and interactional justice:

- Distributive justice: focuses on the specific outcome of the firm’s recovery effort. It is a form of equity in exchange. In other words, what specifically did the offending firm offer the customer in the form of compensation for the service failure, and did the compensation offset the costs/ inconvenience of the service failure?
- Procedural justice: examines the process that is undertaken to arrive at the final outcome. Hence, even though a customer may be satisfied with the type of recovery strategy offered, recovery evaluation may be poor due to the time and effort spent trying to obtain recompense or recovery outcome.
- Interactional justice: refers to the manner in which the service recovery process is implemented and how recovery outcomes are presented.

All three types of justice should be taken into consideration when devising recovery remedies.

== Factors ==
There are several factors behind the Service Recovery Paradox phenomenon:

Customer dissatisfaction
Customer dissatisfaction plays an important role for a firm in improving service quality and gaining loyal customers. Customer dissatisfaction may have a bigger effect on service quality and customer loyalty than customer satisfaction. A firm should aim to minimise customer dissatisfaction. Therefore, good recovery of a certain service by a firm may lead a customer's dissatisfaction to return to at least the level before a service failure occurred and even turn into satisfaction.
Customer perceived value
High perceived value is believed to lead to high satisfaction. In case of a service failure, a firm's goal should be to provide service recovery, to increase perceived value by customers and decrease dissatisfaction. Depending on the quality of the service recovery, a customer's perceived value may be higher than his/her pre-failure perceived value.
Customer trust
A customer's trust in a firm leads to that individual thinking that the firm will provide quality service, which results in the firm gaining a loyal customer. Even in the case of service failures, which decrease customer trust, firms can provide recovery efforts to increase trust and re-gain loyalty.
Customer switching Behavior
Customers may voice their complaints or switch their preferred firm in the case of a service failure. In both cases, the profitability of a firm is damaged. Good service recovery is important in terms of customer retention and can lead to stronger loyalty for customers, thus further increasing customer retention exceeding the pre-failure level.

== Empirical Evidence ==
Empirical studies examining the Service Recovery Paradox have yielded mixed results. Some studies support the existence of SRP while other studies have contradictory findings. One study concludes that although Service Recovery Paradox exists, and its effects are significant, it is a very rare occurrence and it should not have any managerial relevance. Another empirical study which examined the repurchasing behaviors of the customers of a telecommunication company, discovered that the number of customers who repurchased after a good service recovery were significantly higher than those who did not. However, Michel and Coughlan in their 2009 study, using data from Swiss bank customers, concluded that service recovery paradox may only occur in case of mediocre service but not excellent service. Another conclusion was that the effect was most likely to occur when a number of conditions were met, such as the customer considering the failure not to be serious and to be out of the firm’s control. Some research has suggested that the service recovery paradox may be limited in scope and frequency. Meta-analytic evidence shows that while the paradox has a significant positive effect on customer satisfaction, it does not consistently influence behavioural outcomes such as repurchase intentions, word-of-mouth, or corporate image. In addition, empirical studies using large real-world customer datasets suggest that the paradox is a relatively rare event and that its overall impact may be small, limiting its managerial relevance. A meta-analysis by de Matos, Henrique and Rossi aimed to get a better understanding of the SRP phenomenon to help further research by:

1. Estimating its combined effect for the key variables such as repurchase intentions and satisfaction.
2. Testing how studies might influence these results.
3. Suggesting further research directions.

== See also ==
- Attribution theory
- Attribution bias
- Customer satisfaction
- Distributive justice
- Organisational justice
- Service recovery
- Services marketing
