= Employee morale =

Morale of employees in workspace environment

Employee morale or workspace morale is the morale of employees in workspace environment. It is proven to have a direct effect on productivity.

== History ==
Long used by the military as a "mission-critical" measure of the psychological readiness of troops, high morale has been shown to be a powerful driver of performance in all organizations. Extensive research demonstrates its benefits in productivity, profitability, customer satisfaction and worker health. By measuring morale with employee surveys many business owners and managers have long been aware of a direct, causative connection between that morale, (which includes job satisfaction, opinions of their management and many other aspects of the workplace culture) and the performance of their organization.

== Importance and effects ==
Recognized as one of the major factors affecting productivity and overall financial stability of any business, low morale may lead to reduced concentration, which in turn can cause mistakes, poor customer service and missed deadlines. It also can contribute to a high turnover rate and absenteeism. Employee morale proves to be detrimental to the business in these respects. Morale can drive an organization forward or can lead to employee discontent, poor job performance, and absenteeism (Ewton, 2007). With low morale comes a high price tag. The Gallup Organization estimates that there are 22 million actively disengaged employees costing the American economy as much as $350 billion per year in lost productivity including absenteeism, illness, and other problems that result when employees are unhappy at work. Failing to address this issue lead to decreased productivity, increased rates of absenteeism and associated costs, increased conflicts in the work environment, increased customer or consumer complaints, and increased employee turnover rates and costs associated with selection and training replacement staff.

== Possible definitions of morale ==
Morale- a state of individual psychological well being based upon a sense of confidence and usefulness and purpose. The spirit of a group that makes the members want the group to succeed.

== Positive effect of high employee morale ==
The effects of high employee morale have been studied and are both proven and numerous. One of the biggest benefits is productivity. Happy workers are 12% more productive. The increased productivity can be attributed to a number of factors, including reduction in workplace accidents, decreased stress levels, and even a downturn in number of sick days taken due to the positive effect on employee health that high morale provides. High morale effects employee's motivation, their performance, and their willingness to adapt to organizational strategies. High morale will cause employees to put in extra effort, find ways to work more efficiently, and do higher quality work. An employer with a well-known track record of high morale among employees is also much more likely to attract and retain high talent employees. High morale provides a competitive edge in good times and bad. It also increases customer satisfaction rates.

== Negative effect of low employee morale ==
There are many negative effects that come along with low employee morale. When a business shows little to no consideration to their employees, many will look for work elsewhere, resulting in a high turnover rate. High turnover can cost the business a lot of money, since they will need to now advertise for these positions and pay for new employee training. This becomes a bad investment when they are constantly paying to train for the same position. High turnover can cost anywhere from 30%-400% of an annual salary, and with an estimated 22 million disengaged employees per year, low morale is costing the economy as much as $350 billion in lost productivity. Leaders who fail to address morale issues in the workplace face the following: decreased productivity, increased rates of absenteeism and associated costs, increased conflicts in the work environment, increased patient complaints and dissatisfied consumers of care, and increased employee turnover rates and costs associated with hiring and training replacement staff. In closing, low employee morale can negatively affect a business in many ways that will cost them much more money in the long run than it would to have better morale.

== See also ==
- Employee engagement
- Eustress
- Industrial and organizational psychology
- Job satisfaction
- Occupational burnout
- Occupational inequality
- Occupational justice
- Occupational injustice
- Occupational segregation
- Social support
