= Thomas Tyler =

Thomas or Tom Tyler may refer to:

- Tom Tyler (1903–1954), American actor
- Tom R. Tyler (born 1950), professor of psychology and law
- Thomas Tyler (scholar) (1826–1902), writer and Shakespeare expert
- Tom Tyler (musician), British singer/songwriter
- Thomas Tyler (martyr) in Marian persecutions
- Thomas Tyler, character played by Mel Novak
- Thomas M. Tyler, Maine State Representative
- Detective Inspector Tom Tyler, series of books by Maureen Jennings
