= Occupational injustice =

Occupational injustice derives from the concept of occupational justice, which originated in 1997 with social scientists/ occupational therapists Ann Wilcock of Australia and Elizabeth Townsend of Canada. As a particular application of social justice, occupational injustice occurs when a person is denied, excluded from or deprived of opportunity to pursue meaningful occupations or when unchosen occupations are imposed upon them thus limiting life satisfaction. The construct of occupational rights stems from human rights but focuses on the inherent right of individuals to participate in occupations, construed as their personally meaningful and goal-directed use of time. Through this participation, occupational rights contribute to fulfillment and self-actualization. Groups that may be vulnerable to experiencing occupational injustices include cultural, religious, and ethnic minority groups, child labourers, the unemployed, prisoners, persons with substance use disorder, residents of institutions, refugees, women, and nonhuman animals.

There are several categories of occupational injustice:

- Occupational apartheid occurs when a certain population, generally those who are marginalized, are denied access to participation in occupations due to environmental conditions. Moreover, they are not granted the right to participate in meaningful occupations, thus limiting their health and well-being. This can occur at an individual, community, or societal level. OTs providing interventions within a segregated population must focus on increasing occupational engagement through large-scale environmental modification and occupational exploration. OTs can address occupational engagement through group and individual skill-building opportunities, as well as community-based experiences that explore free and local resources.
- Occupational deprivation evolves over time and results from external factors that prevent an individual from engaging in meaningful occupations. Occupational deprivation can negatively impact feelings of self-efficacy and identity. Prisoners represent a population that experiences prolonged occupational deprivation. · OTs can help in raising awareness and bringing communities together to reduce occupational deprivation. OTs can recommend removal of environmental barriers to facilitate occupation, while designing programs that enable engagement. Advocacy by providing information to policy to prevent possible unintended occupational deprivation and increase social cohesion and inclusion.
- Occupational marginalization occurs when the decision-making process is taken away from people attempting to participate in occupations. An overarching force places standards on how, where, and when an individual should participate in occupations. Thus, there is not a limit on participation itself, however the choices associated with occupational participation are restricted. A higher power such as government, or managerial policies put restrictions on time, places, policies, laws, and funding, that ultimately limit client choice. OTs can design, develop, and/or provide programs that mitigate the negative impacts of occupational marginalization and enhance optimal levels of performance and wellbeing that enable participation.
- Occupational alienation represents prolonged isolation, disconnectedness, sense of meaninglessness, and emptiness resulting from lack of resources and opportunities to experience enrichment in occupations. A population vulnerable to experiencing occupational alienation is refugees in confinement who are required to work in unpreferred environments doing unpreferred tasks for little or no wages. OTs can develop individualized activities tailored to the interests of the individual to maximize their potential. OTs can design, develop and promote programs that can be inclusive and provide a variety of choices that the individual can engage in.
- Occupational imbalance occurs when a certain population is unable to reap the benefits of economic production. The underemployed and over-employed are left out of occupations that enrich one's lives. Social and economic segregation occurs, leading to an imbalance in privileges and benefits that are associated with certain occupations of a higher socioeconomic status. OTs can advocate fostering for supportive environments for participation in occupations that promote individuals’ well-being and in advocating for building healthy public policy.
- Territorial occupational injustice (occupational displacement): represents a negative impact on occupational life that occurs when individuals or groups of people are removed or uprooted from territories of occupational, cultural, or economic significance.

The role of occupational therapists working with this population involves advocating for justice to ensure that the occupational rights of clients are fulfilled. More specifically, this includes ensuring that individuals are given equal opportunities to engage in meaningful occupations. Occupational therapists collaborate with their clients to form goals and objectives that give way to social inclusion, and focus on client-centered therapy in order to allow individuals to participate in occupations of their choosing. Advocacy by practitioners and researchers can include funding for the underprivileged, all-inclusive research that encompasses excluded populations, bringing occupational therapy services to developing countries, and conscious advocacy with schools, transportation systems, government, corrections, higher education, and worldwide systems. Occupational therapists can also address occupational injustices through increasing awareness of injustices, providing occupation-focused services, and promoting collaboration with those experiencing injustices as well as other relevant stakeholders such as community organizations, government programs, or other professionals.

== See also ==
- Employee morale
- Injustice
- Organizational justice
- Occupational science
