= Tony Dundon =

Irish academic

- Citizenship: Irish British
- Occupations: Academic, professor, researcher
- Known for: Research in Human Resource Management, Employment Relations, Industrial Relations and Employee Voice

Tony Dundon is an Irish academic and specialises in human resource management (HRM), employment relations, and industrial relations.

== Career ==
Dundon is a professor of Human Resource Management and Employment Relations in the Department of Work and Employment Studies at the Kemmy Business School, University of Limerick. He is also a visiting professor at the Work and Equalities Institute at the University of Manchester.

Earlier in his career, Dundon was a researcher and lecturer in Employment Studies at the Manchester School of Management, University of Manchester Institute of Science and Technology (UMIST); and later Professor at the J.E. Cairnes School of Business and Economics, National University of Ireland Galway, where he served as Head of the Management Department.

He was also involved in the university's Center for Innovation and Structural Change. He was editor-in-chief of the Human Resource Management Journal 2009–2016. Between 2014 and 2019 he was Head of the Human Resource Management and Employment Relations Group (HRMERL) at Alliance Manchester Business School, University of Manchester.

His previous visiting academic appointments have included the University of Sydney, Queensland University of Technology, TBS Education (formerly Toulouse Business School) and the University of St. Andrews Management School, where he also held a visiting professorship.

== Research ==
Dundon's research examines employment relations, human resource management, industrial relations and the relationship between organisational performance and workplace practices. His work has addressed employee voice and representation, trade union organisation and renewal, employment regulation, non-union workplaces and the changing nature of work. His more recent research interests include the effects of digital technologies on employment, platform-based work and the gig economy, labour market inequalities, worker participation and employment rights.

Dundon's research has appeared in academic journals including Human Relations, British Journal of Industrial Relations, Work, Employment and Society, Human Resource Management Journal and Academy of Management Perspectives.

He has also contributed to public discussions on employment and workplace issues. In 2018, he co-authored an article with Debra Howcroft for The Conversation examining automation, robotics and the proposition that technological developments would bring about the end of work.

Dundon is a Fellow of the Academy of Social Sciences (FAcSS), the Royal Society of Arts (FRSA) and the Chartered Institute of Personnel and Development (FCIPD).

== Selected publications ==
- Dundon, T., Wilkinson, A., Marchington, M., & Ackers, P. (2004). The meanings and purpose of employee voice. The International Journal of Human Resource Management, 15(6), 1149–1170.
- Cullinane, N., & Dundon, T. (2006). The psychological contract: A critical review. International Journal of Management Reviews, 8(2), 113–129.
- Donaghey, J., Cullinane, N., Dundon, T., & Wilkinson, A. (2011). Reconceptualising employee silence: Problems and prognosis. Work, Employment and Society, 25(1), 51–67.
- Wilkinson, A., Donaghey, J., Dundon, T., & Freeman, R. B. (2020). Handbook of research on employee voice (2nd ed.). Edward Elgar Publishing. DOI:https://doi.org/10.4337/9781788971188
- Heffernan, M., & Dundon, T. (2016). Cross-level effects of high-performance work systems (HPWS) and employee well-being: The mediating effect of organisational justice. Human Resource Management Journal, 26(2), 211–231.
- Harney, B., & Dundon, T. (2006). Capturing complexity: Developing an integrated approach to analysing HRM in SMEs. Human Resource Management Journal, 16(1), 48–73.
- Wilkinson, A., Dundon, T., Marchington, M., & Ackers, P. (2004). Changing patterns of employee voice: Case studies from the UK and Republic of Ireland. Journal of Industrial Relations, 46(3), 298–322.
- Dundon, T., & Rafferty, A. (2018). The (potential) demise of HRM? Human Resource Management Journal, 28(3), 377–391.
- Dundon, T., & Gollan, P. J. (2007). Re-conceptualizing voice in the non-union workplace. The International Journal of Human Resource Management, 18(7), 1182–1198.
- Nechanska, E., Hughes, E., & Dundon, T. (2020). Towards an integration of employee voice and silence. Human Resource Management Review, 30(1), Article 100674.
