= Occupational science =

Scientific discipline

Occupational science is a discipline dedicated to the study of humans as "doers" or "occupational beings". As used here, the term "occupation" refers to the intentional or goal-directed activities that characterize daily human life as well as the characteristics and patterns of purposeful activity that occur over lifetimes.

== History ==
Occupational science evolved as a loosely organized effort by many scholars in different disciplines to understand human time use. It was named and given additional impetus in 1989 by a team of faculty at the University of Southern California (USC) led by Dr. Elizabeth Yerxa, who had been influenced by the work of graduate students under the supervision of Mary Reilly at the same university. Since its formal beginning at that time, which coincided with the establishment of a Ph.D. program in Occupational Science at USC; occupational science has evolved as an additional source of research to expand empirical knowledge underlying the profession of occupational therapy.

== Links between occupational science and occupational therapy ==
Occupational science was developed by scholars (mainly from the profession of occupational therapy) who drew from original ideas predating the founding of occupational therapy. It may thus be considered as a developing or emerging academic discipline. The substrates (or underlying dimensions) of occupation (form, function, and meaning) are difficult to observe and quantify, and thus require and benefit from a multidisciplinary approach. While both occupational science and occupational therapy are rooted in systems theory and holistic views of human agency, the methods for observing and understanding an occupation's form (how something is done), function (its purpose), and meaning (how it is understood and experienced by the doer) are not always holistic in approach. For instance, disciplines such as biomechanics and psychology inform occupational science but, individually, are not necessarily concerned about how their explanations contribute to an integrated understanding of the factors collectively influencing a person's daily life. Professional practice in occupational therapy can prompt new ideas and spark potential research within the discipline of occupational science; although typically, knowledge from academic disciplines precedes the application of such knowledge in applied fields. Occupational science has the capacity to provide insight into the primary modality of occupational therapy (occupation) through studying the consequences of participation in occupation and its therapeutic benefits. Reciprocally, occupational therapy research may provide insights into how human agency and the factors influencing it change under conditions of illness, disability or therapeutic intervention. Additional viewpoints about these relationships may be found in documents describing relationships between occupational science and occupational therapy that have been published by the World Federation of Occupational Therapists (WFOT) and the Society for the Study of Occupation in the United States (SSO:USA). Research has been reported that begins to delineate key or essential concepts from occupational science as they pertain to the practice of occupational therapy. Further refinement of this work may help focus research initiatives in occupational science to guide educators, scientists, and practitioners to advance the evidence-based use of occupation in occupational therapy practice.

== Relationships between human occupation and health and well-being ==
Beyond the well-documented benefits of regular physical activity, occupations that engender purpose, competence and self esteem may provide psychological benefits related to satisfying needs for meaning. Living situations that limit or restrict participation in meaningful occupations (such as geographic isolation, refugeeism or incarceration) or lead to participation in harmful occupations, (such as substance abuse, deviant or risky behaviors), can lead to "illness, isolation and despair," or even death. However, participation in occupations shown to be beneficial or restorative can enhance health. Through participation in engaging or restorative occupations, the mental state of individuals can be improved and result in feelings of regeneration. Sleep, an area of occupation, not only regenerates physical and cognitive processes, but also is required for satisfactory occupational functioning. Participating in other relaxing or tension-reducing occupations, such as (for example) reading a book, getting a massage, going for a walk, exercising, or pursuing an engaging hobby; may provide physical, cognitive and mental restoration, and stress reduction.

Empirical research linking the perceived psychological and physiological benefits of participation in different types of daily human occupation is ongoing. Questions about the nature of different dimensions of human occupation and their influences on human identity, behavior and states of being are viewed by occupational scientists as suitable areas of investigation. Developmental theorists have long hypothesized that the occupations of childhood and activity related events characteristic of different stages of adulthood are critical factors in physical, cognitive and psychological growth and maturation.

Similarly, there is ongoing interest in how patterns of daily time use, including habits, routines, and lifestyles, may be related to states of well-being. Adolf Meyer, a prominent early psychiatrist and advocate for occupational therapy in the United States, was among the first to speculate that a regular pattern, rhythm or flow of daily occupations contributed to mental health. Meyer also postulated that the life history of his patients could be used to identify situational conditions and events that helped explain their disorders, thus providing an avenue for prevention through community interventions to promote public health (mental hygiene).

== Academic application ==
The development of occupational science as an academic discipline has been advanced through the creation of several university-based programs of study leading to undergraduate and graduate degrees in the field. Disciplines within which occupational scientists can be found include architecture, engineering, education, marketing, psychology, sociology, anthropology, economics, occupational therapy, public health, and geography. There are several national, regional and international societies dedicated to promoting the evolution of this specialized area of human science. Academic journals containing content directly relevant to occupational science include the Journal of Occupational Science, OTJR: Occupational Therapy Journal of Research, Journal of Happiness Studies, 'Quality of Life Research, Applied Research in Quality of Life, Canadian Journal of Occupational Therapy, The Scandinavian Journal of Occupational Therapy, the American Journal of Occupational Therapy and various other occupational therapy journals.

== See also ==
- Occupational therapist
- Occupational therapy
- Occupational justice
