= Service recovery =

Concept in customer service

Service recovery is an organization's resolution of problems from dissatisfied customers, converting those customers into loyal customers. It is the action a service provider takes in response to service failure. By including customer satisfaction in the definition, service recovery is a thought-out, planned process of returning aggrieved/dissatisfied customers to a state of satisfaction with an organization/service. Service recovery differs from complaint management in its focus on immediate reaction to service failures. Complaint management is based on customer complaints, which, in turn, may be triggered by service failures. But since most dissatisfied customers are reluctant to complain, service recovery attempts to solve problems at the service encounter before customers complain or before they leave the service encounter dissatisfied. Both complaint management and service recovery are customer retention strategies. Researchers recently proved that strategies such as value co-creation and follow-up can improve the effectiveness of service recovery efforts.

== Effects ==
Literature on service recovery suggests that a good recovery has a positive impact on satisfaction, recommendation intention, word-of-mouth, loyalty, image, and trust.

Effective service recovery could not only eliminate the loss of service failure, but also improve much higher service satisfaction on contrast with the situation without service failure. Some even argue that a good recovery can increase satisfaction to a higher level than if nothing had gone wrong in the first place, which is referred to as the service recovery paradox. Many researchers provided evidence in the existence of service recovery paradox from rational customer expectation through interaction between employees and customers under service failure.

== Categories ==
Three categories of recovery strategies can be distinguished: Customer recovery is aiming at satisfied customers, process recovery tries to improve processes and employee recovery as an internal marketing strategy to help employees coping with failure and recovery situations.

== See also ==
- Services marketing
