= Organizational justice =

Social justice theory

Greenberg (1987) introduced the concept of organizational justice with regard to how an employee judges the behavior of the organization and the employee's resulting attitude and behaviour. For example, if a firm makes redundant half of the workers, an employee may feel a sense of injustice with a resulting change in attitude and a drop in productivity.

Justice or fairness refers to the idea that an action or decision is morally right, which may be defined according to ethics, religion, fairness, equity, or law. People are naturally attentive to the justice of events and situations in their everyday lives, across a variety of contexts. Individuals react to actions and decisions made by organizations every day. An individual's perceptions of these decisions as fair or unfair can influence the individual's subsequent attitudes and behaviors. Fairness is often of central interest to organizations because the implications of perceptions of injustice can impact job attitudes and behaviors at work. Justice in organizations can include issues related to perceptions of fair pay, equal opportunities for promotion, and personnel selection procedures.

There are two forms of Organizational Justice; outcome favorability and outcome justice. Outcome favorability is a judgement based on personal worth, and outcome justice is based on moral propriety. Managers often believe that employees think of justice as merely the desired outcome.

== Overview ==
Four components of organizational justice are distributive, procedural, interpersonal, and informational justice. Research also suggests the importance of affect and emotion in the appraisal of the fairness of a situation as well as one's behavioral and attitudinal reactions to the situation. Much literature in the industrial/organizational psychology field has examined organizational justice as well as the associated outcomes. Perceptions of justice influence many key organizational outcomes such as motivation and job satisfaction.

Recent criticism of the conception of organizational justice as an attitudinal perception note the danger of mistaking a worker’s perception of just treatment with a worker being treated fairly.

== Corporate social responsibility ==
A concept related to organizational justice is corporate social responsibility (CSR). Organizational justice generally refers to perceptions of fairness in treatment of individuals internal to that organization while corporate social responsibility focuses on the fairness of treatment of entities external to the organization. Corporate social responsibility refers to a mechanism by which businesses monitor and regulate their performance in line with moral and societal standards such that it has positive influences on all of its stakeholders. Thus, CSR involves organizations going above and beyond what is moral or ethical and behaving in ways that benefit members of society in general. It has been proposed that an employee's perceptions of their organization's level of corporate social responsibility can impact that individual's own attitudes and perceptions of justice even if they are not the victim of unfair acts.

== Roots in equity theory ==
The idea of organizational justice stems from equity theory, which posits that judgments of equity and inequity are derived from comparisons between one's self and others based on inputs and outcomes. Inputs refer to what a person perceives to contribute (e.g., knowledge and effort) while outcomes are what an individual perceives to get out of an exchange relationship (e.g., pay and recognition). Comparison points against which these inputs and outcomes are judged may be internal (one's self at an earlier time) or external (other individuals).

== Types ==
Researchers have classified three main components of organizational justice: distributive, procedural, and interactional.

=== Distributive ===
Distributive justice is conceptualized as the fairness associated with decision outcomes and distribution of resources. The outcomes or resources distributed may be tangible (e.g., pay) or intangible (e.g., praise). Perceptions of distributive justice can be fostered when outcomes are perceived to be equally applied. Distributive justice may involve one or more of three different rationales for how resources are distributed: equity, equality and need. Equity focuses more on rewarding employees based on their contribution, and thus can be viewed as capitalist justice: the ratio of one's inputs to one's outcomes. Equality on the other hand provides each employee with the same compensation. Finally, need is providing a benefit based on one's personal requirement.

=== Procedural ===
Procedural justice is defined as the fairness of the processes that lead to outcomes. When individuals feel that they have a voice in the process or that the process involves characteristics such as consistency, accuracy, ethicality, and lack of bias then procedural justice is enhanced. Procedural justice is the appropriateness of the allocation process. It includes six main points which are consistency, lack of bias, accuracy, representation of all concerned, correction and ethics. Procedural justice seems to be essential to maintaining institutional legitimacy. What is more interesting is that procedural justice affects what workers believe about the organization as a whole.

=== Interactional ===
Interactional justice refers to the treatment that an individual receives as decisions are made and can be promoted by providing explanations for decisions and delivering the news with sensitivity and respect. A construct validation study published in 2001 suggests that interactional justice should be broken into two components: interpersonal and informational justice. Interpersonal justice refers to perceptions of respect and propriety in one's treatment while informational justice relates to the adequacy of the explanations given in terms of their timeliness, specificity, and truthfulness

Interpersonal justice "reflects the degree to which people are treated with politeness, dignity, and respect by authorities and third parties involved in executing procedures or determining outcomes".

Informational justice "focuses on explanations provided to people that convey information about why procedures were used in a certain way or why outcomes were distributed in a certain fashion".

=== Proposed models ===
Three different models have been proposed to explain the structure of organizational justice perceptions including a two factor model, a three factor model, and a four factor model. Many researchers have studied organizational justice in terms of the three factor model; while others have used a two factor model in which interpersonal justice is subsumed under procedural justice while yet some other studies suggest a four factor model best fits the data. Greenberg (1990) proposed a two-factor model and Sweeney and McFarlin (1993) found support for a two-factor model composed of distributive and procedural justice. Through the use of structural equation modeling, Sweeney and McFarlin found that distributive justice was related to outcomes that are person-level (e.g., pay satisfaction) while procedural justice was related to organization-level outcomes (e.g., organizational commitment).

The accuracy of the two-factor model was challenged by studies that suggested a third factor (interactional justice) may be involved. Some argue that interactional justice is distinct from procedural justice because it represents the social exchange component of the interaction and the quality of treatment whereas procedural justice represents the processes that were used to arrive at the decision outcomes. Generally researchers are in agreement regarding the distinction between procedural and distributive justice but there is more controversy over the distinction between interactional and procedural justice. Colquitt demonstrated that a four-factor model (including procedural, distributive, interpersonal, and informational justice) fit the data significantly better than a two or three factor model. Colquitt's construct validation study also showed that each of the four components have predictive validity for different key organizational outcomes (e.g., commitment and rule compliance).

Another model of organizational justice proposed by Byrne and colleagues suggested that organizational justice is a multi-foci construct, one where employees see justice as coming from a source - either the organization or their supervisor. Thus, rather than focus on justice as the three or four factor component model, Byrne suggested that employees personify the organization and they distinguish between whether they feel the organization or supervisor have treated them fairly (interactional), use fair procedures (procedural), or allocate rewards or assignments fairly (distributive justice). A number of researchers used this model exploring the possibility that justice is more than just 3 or 4 factors.

== The role of affect in perceptions ==
One of the key constructs that has been shown to play a role in the formation of organizational justice perceptions is affect. The precise role of affect in organizational justice perceptions depends on the form of affectivity being examined (emotions, mood, disposition) as well as the context and type of justice being measured. Affect may serve as an antecedent, outcome, or even a mediator of organizational justice perceptions.

Barsky, et al. provide a model that explains the role of affect and emotions at various stages of the appraisal and reaction stages of justice perception formation and illustrates that injustice is generally an affect-laden and subjective experience. Affect and emotions can be part of the reactions to perceived injustice, as studies have shown that the more injustice that is perceived, the higher degrees of negative emotions are experienced. In addition, affect can act as a mediator between justice perceptions and actions taken to redress the perceived injustice. Affect plays this role in equity theory such that negative affective reactions act as a mediator between perceptions and actions, as emotional reactions to justice motivate individuals to take action to restore equity.

A 2007 meta-analysis by Barsky and Kaplan condenses many studies on this topic and explains that state and trait level affect can influence one's perceptions of justice. It supports the idea that both state and trait level negative affect can act as antecedents to justice perceptions. State and trait level negative affect are negatively associated with interactional, procedural, and distributive justice perceptions. Conversely, positive state and trait affectivity was linked to higher ratings of interactional, procedural and distributive justice.

Based on the research regarding the central role of affect in justice perceptions, Lang, Bliese, Lang, and Adler (2011) extended this research and studied the idea that sustained clinical levels of negative affect (depression) could be a precursor to perceptions of injustice in organizations. They tested longitudinal cross-lagged effects between organizational justice perceptions and employee depressive symptoms and found that depressive symptoms do lead to subsequent organizational justice perceptions. Thus, affect can serve as an antecedent to justice perceptions in this instance.

== Antecedents of perceptions ==
=== Employee participation ===
One antecedent to perceptions of organizational justice is the extent to which employees feel that they are involved in decision-making or other organizational procedures. Higher levels of justice are perceived when employees feel that they have input in processes than when employees do not perceive that they have the opportunity to participate. (Greenberg & Folger, 1983) The opportunity or ability to participate in decision making improves an individual's perceptions of procedural justice, even when the decision is unfavorable to the individual. In addition, other studies have shown that employee input is related to both procedural and interpersonal justice perceptions.

=== Communication ===
A second antecedent to organizational justice perceptions is organizational communication with employees. Communication has been shown to be related to interpersonal and informational justice perceptions. The quality of communication by an organization or manager can improve justice perceptions by improving employee perceptions of manager trustworthiness and also by reducing feelings of uncertainty. It is important that the information provided be accurate, timely, and helpful in order for the impact on justice perceptions to be positive.

=== Justice climate ===
Perceptions of organizational justice can be influenced by others, such as co-workers and team members. Recent research suggests that team level perceptions of justice form what is called a 'justice climate' which can impact individuals' own views of justice. Employees working within a team may share their perceptions with one another which can lead to a shared interpretation of the fairness of events. Research findings show that individuals can "learn" justice evaluations from team members and these can lead to homogeneity of justice perceptions within teams, creating a strong justice climate. Thus, group-level perceptions of justice can be conceptualized as an antecedent to individuals' justice perceptions.

== Outcomes of perceptions ==
Employees' perceptions of injustice within the organization can result in a myriad of outcomes both positive and negative. Outcomes are affected by perceptions of organizational justice as a whole or by different factors of organizational justice. Commonly cited outcomes affected by organizational justice include trust, performance, job satisfaction, organizational commitment, organizational citizenship behaviors (OCBs), counterproductive work behaviors (CWBs), absenteeism, turnover, and emotional exhaustion.

=== Trust ===
The relationship between trust and organizational justice perceptions is based on reciprocity. Trust in the organization is built from the employee's belief that since current organizational decisions are fair, future organizational decisions will be fair. The continuance of employee trust in the organization and the organization continuing to meet the employee's expectations of fairness creates the reciprocal relationship between trust and organizational justice. Research has found that procedural justice is the strongest predictor of organizational trust. A positive relationship between an employee and supervisor can lead to trust in the organization.

=== Performance ===
The impact of organizational justice perceptions on performance is believed to stem from equity theory. This would suggest that when people perceive injustice they seek to restore justice. One way that employees restore justice is by altering their level of job performance. Procedural justice affects performance as a result of its impact on employee attitudes. Distributive justice affects performance when efficiency and productivity are involved. Improving justice perceptions improves productivity and performance.

=== Job satisfaction and organizational commitment ===
Job satisfaction was found to be positively associated with overall perceptions of organizational justice such that greater perceived injustice results in lower levels of job satisfaction and greater perceptions of justice result in higher levels of job satisfaction. Additionally, organizational commitment is related to perceptions of procedural justice such that greater perceived injustice results in diminished commitment while greater perceived justice results in increases commitment to the organization.

=== Organizational citizenship behavior ===
Organizational citizenship behaviors are actions that employees take to support the organization that go above and beyond the scope of their job description. OCBs are related to both procedural justice and distributive justice perceptions. As organizational actions and decisions are perceived as more just, employees are more likely to engage in OCBs. Karriker and Williams (2009) established that OCBs are directed toward either the supervisor or the organization depending on whether the perception of just stems from the supervisor or the organization. Additionally, a relationship was found between interpersonal justice and OCBs; however, this relationship was not mediated by the source of justice perceptions.

=== Counterproductive work behaviors ===
Counterproductive work behaviors (CWBs) are "intentional behaviors on the part of an organizational member viewed by the organization as contrary to their legitimate interests." There are many reasons that explain why organizational justice can affect CWBs. Increased judgments of procedural injustice, for instance, can lead to employee unwillingness to comply with an organization's rules because the relationship between perceived procedural injustice and CWBs could be mediated by perceived normative conflict, i.e., the extent to which employees perceive conflict between the norms of their workgroup and the rules of the organization. Thus, the more perceptions of procedural injustice lead employees to perceived normative conflict, the more it is likely that CWBs occur.

=== Absenteeism and withdrawal ===
Absenteeism, or non-attendance, is another outcome of perceived injustice related to equity theory. Failure to receive a promotion is an example of a situation in which feelings of injustice may result in an employee being absent from work without reason. Johns (2001) found that when people saw both their commitment to the organization and the organization's commitment to them as high, absenteeism is diminished. Additionally, withdrawal, or leaving the organization, is a more extreme outcome stemming from the same equity theory principles. Distributive justice perceptions are most strongly related to withdrawal.

=== Emotional exhaustion ===
Emotional exhaustion, which related to employee health and burnout, is related to overall organizational justice perceptions. As perceptions of justice increase employee health increases and burnout decreases. Distributive, procedural, and interactional justice perceptions are able to capture state specific levels of emotional exhaustion which fade over time; however, overall organizational justice perceptions give the most stable picture of the relationship between justice perceptions and emotional exhaustion over time.

=== Health ===
According to Schunck et al., physical health is related to an employee's perception of distributive justice. As the employee's perception of earnings justice decreases, the physical health of the employee decreases.

=== Turnover intention ===
Perceptions of injustice and unfairness are significant antecedents and determinants of turnover intention. In other words, turnover intention is a considerable outcome of an employee's fairness perceptions. Although all three dimensions of organizational justice may play a role in an employee's intention to exit an organization, interactional and distributive justice are more predictive of turnover intention than procedural justice.

=== Conflict management ===
Managers who are sensitive to organizational justice issues are more likely to adopt cooperative conflict management methods in the face of conflicts with employees.

== See also ==
- Corporate social responsibility
- Counterproductive work behavior
- Distributive justice
- Emotional exhaustion
- Equity theory
- Interactional justice
- Perceived psychological contract violation
- Perceived organizational support
- Job performance
- Job satisfaction
- Occupational injustice
- Organizational citizenship behavior
- Organizational commitment
- Procedural justice
- Structural equation modeling
