= Tom R. Tyler =

- Born: March 3, 1950 (age 76); Columbus, OH
- Citizenship: U.S.A.
- Education: Columbia University (BA); University of California, Los Angeles (PhD)
- Known for: Why people obey the law
- Awards: Kalven prize for "paradigm shifting scholarship in the study of law and society". Law and Society Association, 2000. Lifetime achievement award for promoting interdisciplinary research on social justice. International Society for Justice Research, 2012. The Stockholm Prize in Criminology for research on legitimacy of legal institutions and governance. The Stockholm Prize in Criminology, 2024.
- Scientific career
- Fields: Social Psychology and Law
- Workplaces: New York University; Yale Law School
- Thesis: Drawing inferences from experiences: the effects of crime victimization experiences upon crime-related attitudes and behaviors (1978)
- Website: http://www.law.yale.edu/faculty/TTyler.htm

Tom R. Tyler (born March 3, 1950) is a professor of psychology and law at Yale Law School, known for his contributions to understanding why people obey the law. A 2012 review article on procedural justice by Anthony Bottoms and Justice Tankebe noted that, "Unquestionably the dominant theoretical approach to legitimacy within these disciplines is that of 'procedural justice,' based especially on the work of Tom Tyler.". Professor Tyler was at New York University, where he was a university professor, from 1997 until he joined the faculty at Yale in January 2012. He earned his B.A. from Columbia University and Ph.D. from the University of California, Los Angeles. In 2024, he was awarded the world's most prestigious award in the field of criminology - The Stockholm Prize in Criminology - for his research on procedural justice.

== Scholarship ==
Tyler is the author or co-author of 9 books and an editor for 6 others. His widely cited 1990 book on Why People Obey the Law was republished in 2006 with a new afterword discussing more recent research and changes in his thinking since its initial publication.

Tyler and Huo (2002) is based on surveys of people in different ethnic groups to understand their concepts of justice. They found that minority African-Americans and Hispanics have essentially the same concept of justice as majority whites but different experiences. They describe two alternative strategies for effective law enforcement:

- Deterrence: effective but inefficient
- Process-based: efficient and effective

The difference in efficiency follows, because people who perceive that they may be victimized unfairly by law enforcement are less likely to cooperate. Tyler and Huo's analyses suggests that biased, unprofessional behavior of police, prosecutors and judges not only produces concerns of injustice, it cripples law enforcement efforts by making it more difficult for police and prosecutors to obtain the evidence needed to convict guilty parties.

Tyler and Blader (2000) discussed procedural justice and cooperative behavior and how they impact the performance of more general groups through their effect on social identity and cooperative behavior.

== Works cited ==
- Tom R. Tyler (1990), Why People Obey the Law, Yale University Press, OL 4783698W, Wikidata Q106943199
- Tom R. Tyler (2006). Why People Obey the Law. Princeton University Press. ISBN 978-0-691-12673-9. LCCN 2005938383. OCLC 69260106. OL 7759207M. Wikidata Q111097755.
- Tyler, Tom R.; Huo, Yuen J. (2002). Trust in the Law: Encouraging Public Cooperation with the Police and Courts. Russell Sage Foundation. ISBN 0871548895.
- Tyler, Tom R.; Blader, Steven L. (2000). Cooperation in Groups: Procedural Justice, Social Identity, and Behavioral Engagement. Psychology Press. ISBN 1-84169-006-6.
