= Occupational justice =

Social justice emphasizing the need for humans and other animals

Occupational justice is a type of social justice emphasizing the need for humans and other animals to freely participate in necessary and meaningful activities. Examples include obtaining, preparing, and eating food, maintaining a home or living space, sleeping, playing, socializing, working, and participating in leisure activities. As scholars in the fields of occupational science and occupational therapy have argued, barriers to participation in such occupations can lead to negative physical and mental health outcomes. Occupational justice, as a living concept and praxis, focuses on the ways in which barriers to occupation are socially produced and unevenly distributed across class, race, gender, sexual orientation, ability, species, and other social dividing lines.

According to The American Occupational Therapy Association, it is the role of occupational therapists (OTs) to help individuals live a life free of systematic barriers put in place by society. OTs do this by advocating for individuals and empowering them.

The originators of the concept, social scientists and occupational therapists Ann Wilcock of Australia and Elizabeth Townsend of Canada, maintain that abundant research in the social and behavioral sciences demonstrates the adverse consequences of isolation, sensory deprivation, unemployment, incarceration, alienation, and boredom, suggesting that the denial of opportunities to engage in purposeful activities necessary for health and well-being creates a type of social injustice, or occupational deprivation, which has been termed "occupational injustice." Occupational justice advocates for occupational opportunities for minority or underrepresented groups, such as the LGBTQIA+ community, refugees, and people of color. Contemplating a utopian vision of an 'occupationally just' world, the originators of the concept note that while "social justice addresses the social relations and social conditions of life, occupational justice addresses what people do in their relationships and conditions for living" (p. 84).

== See also ==
- Employee morale
- Injustice
