= Occupational apartheid =

Occupational therapy concept

Occupational apartheid is the concept in occupational therapy that different individuals, groups and communities can be deprived of meaningful and purposeful activity through segregation due to social, political, economical factors and for social status reasons.

Occupational apartheid may occur due to race, disability, age, gender, sexuality, religious preference, political preference, and creed. A war environment can also contribute to occupational apartheid in which the constraints of war prevent the people living in the midst of combat from accessing past occupations. Occupational therapists recognize that many people facing occupational apartheid do not have the opportunity to freely choose their occupations, and thus are disadvantaged. The health and wellbeing of these individuals, groups and communities is compromised through the deprivation of meaningful and purposeful activities.

In the light of day to day existence, every individual should be of equal status, no matter what their economic, political, health or social status. Occupational apartheid explains the reality that some people may be occupationally more equal than others.

== Groups that may experience occupational apartheid ==
- Homeless adults
- Lesbian, gay, bisexual and transgender people
- Refugee and asylum seekers
- Individuals with disabilities
- Religious groups
- Street children
- Survivors of domestic violence
- Women
- Incarcerated people
- Indigenous People
- Racial Minorities
- The working poor
- Freeters

== See also ==
- Banishment room
- Disparate impact
- Disparate treatment
- Economic inequality
- Exploitation of labour
- Milieu control
- Occupational injustice
- Psychological impact of discrimination on health
- Racial inequality in the United States
- The purpose of a system is what it does
- Toxic workplace
