= Interactional justice =

Interactional justice is defined by sociologist John R. Schermerhorn as the "degree to which the people affected by decision are treated by dignity and respect" (Organizational Behavior, 2013). The theory focuses on the interpersonal treatment people receive when procedures are implemented.

== Classification ==
Interactional justice, a subcomponent of organizational justice, has come to be seen as consisting of two specific types of interpersonal treatment (e.g. Greenberg, 1990a, 1993b). The first labeled interpersonal justice, reflects the degree to which people are treated with politeness, dignity, and respect by authorities or third parties involved in executing procedures or determining outcomes.

The second, labeled informational justice, focuses on the explanations provided to people that convey information about why procedures were used in a certain way or why outcomes were distributed in a certain fashion. Where more adequacy of explanation is prevalent, the perceived level of informational justice is higher (Sam Fricchione, 2006).

== Within an organization ==
It is important that a high degree of interactional justice exists in a subordinate/supervisor relationship in order to reduce the likelihood of counterproductive work behavior. If a subordinate perceives that interactional injustice exists, then the subordinate will hold feelings of resentment toward either the supervisor or institution and will therefore seek to "even the score". A victim of interaction injustice will have increased expressions of hostility toward the offender, co-workers, or the entire organization which can manifest in actions of counterproductive work behavior and reduce the effectiveness of organizational communication.

Abuse directed toward a subordinate from a supervisor often stems from displaced aggression. In this case, the individual (supervisor) is unwilling to retaliate against the direct source of mistreatment and will therefore abuse a less threatening target such as a subordinate since the subordinate is incapable of retaliation. Thus, interactional injustice can essentially trickle-down from the top of an organization to the bottom due to displaced aggression that exists in the top ranks of the hierarchy.

== See also ==
- Distributive justice
- Economic justice
- Organizational justice
- Procedural justice
- Service recovery paradox
- Social interaction
