= Procedural justice =

Fairness in the processes that resolve disputes and allocate resources

Procedural justice is the idea of fairness in the processes that resolve disputes and allocate resources. One aspect of procedural justice is related to discussions of the administration of justice and legal proceedings. This sense of procedural justice is connected to due process (U.S.), fundamental justice (Canada), procedural fairness (Australia), and natural justice (other Common law jurisdictions), but the idea of procedural justice can also be applied to nonlegal contexts in which some process is employed to resolve conflict or divide benefits or burdens. Aspects of procedural justice are an area of study in social psychology, sociology, and organizational psychology.

Procedural justice concerns the fairness (formal equal opportunity) and the transparency of the processes by which decisions are made, and may be contrasted with distributive justice (fairness in the distribution of rights and outcomes), and retributive justice (fairness in the punishment of wrongs). Hearing all parties before a decision is made is one step which would be considered appropriate to be taken in order that a process may then be characterised as procedurally fair. Some theories of procedural justice hold that fair procedure leads to equitable outcomes, even if the requirements of distributive or restorative justice are not met. It has been suggested that this is the outcome of the higher quality interpersonal interactions often found in the procedural justice process, which has shown to be stronger in affecting the perception of fairness during conflict resolution.

== Giving group members a voice ==
Procedural justice deals with the perceptions of fairness regarding procedures and process. It reflects the extent in which an individual perceives that outcome allocation decisions have been fairly made and, in psychological and organizational studies, whether the individual feels he or she has been treated fairly in interactions with others, especially interactions with authorities. The use of fair procedures helps communicate that employees are valued members of the group. Procedural Justice can be examined by focusing on the formal procedures used to make decisions. Procedural justice, a subcomponent of organizational justice, is important in communication and in the workplace because it involves fair procedures, it allows the employees to have a say in the decision process, it gives employees fair treatment, and allows them to have more input in the appraisal process. Additionally, research by Tom R. Tyler and colleagues found that giving disgruntled group members a voice regardless of whether it is instrumental (i.e., a voice that affects the decision-making process) or non-instrumental (i.e., a voice that will not have any weighting on the decision-making process) is sometimes enough for a process to be viewed as fair.

The ability and right to a voice is linked with feelings of respect and value, which emphasizes the importance of the interpersonal factors of procedural justice. This is important in the workplace because employees will feel more satisfied and respected, which can help to increase job task and contextual performance. There is an emphasis on the interpersonal and social aspects of the procedure, which result in employees feeling more satisfied when their voices are able to be heard. This was argued by Greenberg and Folger. Procedural justice also is a major factor that contributes to the expression of employee dissent. It correlates positively with managers' upward dissent. With procedural justice there is a greater deal of fairness in the workplace.

== Leventhal's Rules ==
In 1976, Gerald S. Leventhal attempted to articulate how individuals create their own cognitive maps about the procedures for allocating rewards, punishment, or resources in a given interaction setting or social system (be it a courtroom, classroom, workplace, or other context). He postulated seven categories of structural components to these procedures, and six justice rules by which the "fairness" of each component is evaluated. The seven types of structural components are: selection of agents, setting ground rules, gathering information, decision structure, appeals, safeguards, and change mechanisms. The six justice rules are: consistency, bias suppression, accuracy, correctability, representativeness, and ethicality. These became widely used and referenced, and known as "Leventhal's Rules."

== Rawls on procedural justice ==
In A Theory of Justice, philosopher John Rawls distinguished three ideas of procedural justice:

1. Perfect procedural justice has two characteristics: (1) an independent criterion for what constitutes a fair or just outcome of the procedure, and (2) a procedure that guarantees that the fair outcome will be achieved.
2. Imperfect procedural justice shares the first characteristic of perfect procedural justice—there is an independent criterion for a fair outcome—but no method that guarantees that the fair outcome will be achieved.
3. Pure procedural justice describes situations in which there is no criterion for what constitutes a just outcome other than the procedure itself.

== Evaluating the fairness of different procedural systems ==
There are three main approaches to evaluating whether a particular system of justice is fair: the outcomes model, the balancing model, and the participation model.

=== Outcomes model ===
The idea of the outcomes model of procedural justice is that the fairness of process depends on the procedure producing correct outcomes. For example, if the procedure is a criminal trial, then the correct outcome would be conviction of the guilty and exonerating the innocent. If the procedure were a legislative process, then the procedure would be fair to the extent that it produced good legislation and unfair to the extent that it produced bad legislation. This has many limitations. Principally, if two procedures produced equivalent outcomes, then they are equally just according to this model. However, as the next two sections explain, there are other features about a procedure that make it just or unjust. For example, many would argue that a benevolent dictatorship is not (as) just as a democratic state (even if they have similar outcomes).

=== Balancing model ===
Some procedures are costly. The idea of the balancing model is that a fair procedure is one which reflects a fair balance between the costs of the procedure and the benefits that it produces. Thus, the balancing approach to procedural fairness might in some circumstances be prepared to tolerate or accept false positive verdicts in order to avoid unwanted costs (political) associated with the administration of criminal process. Ronald Dworkin argued that a properly balanced procedure is one that values peoples' rights and treats persons equally.

=== The participation model ===
The idea of the participation model is that a fair procedure is one that affords those who are affected by an opportunity to participate in the making of the decision. In the context of a trial, for example, the participation model would require that the defendant be afforded an opportunity to be present at the trial, to put on evidence, cross examination witnesses, and so forth.

=== Group engagement model ===
Models have also been proposed to understand the psychological basis of justice. One of the more recent of these models is the group engagement model. The group engagement model (GEM), devised by Tom R. Tyler and Steven L. Blader, incorporates past psychological theories to explain the underlying psychological processes of procedural justice. Based on social identity theory and relational models of procedural justice, this model suggests that a group's procedural justice process influences members' identification with the group, which in turn influences their type of engagement within the group.

According to the model, group engagement is seen as either mandatory or discretionary behavior. Mandatory behavior is defined by Tyler and Blader as behavior that is required by the group and thus is motivated by incentives and sanctions. Conversely, discretionary behavior is motivated by internal values and is seen as more cooperative and therefore ideal within a group. Depending on the procedural justice processes of the group, the social identity of the members will be influenced accordingly and different values will be emphasised. The more a member agrees with the type of procedural justice employed, the more they will identify with their group. This increased identification results in the internalization of the group's values and attitudes for the group member. This creates a circular relationship as the group's procedural justice processes will affect group members' levels of identification and, as a consequence, this level and type of identification will affect their own values of what is fair and unfair. This, in turn, will then affect how the individuals will engage with their group, with higher identification leading to discretionary and more desirable behavior.

== Due process and natural justice ==
The idea of procedural justice is especially influential in the law. In the United States, for example, a concern for procedural justice is reflected in the Due Process clauses of the United States Constitution. In other common law countries, this same idea is sometimes called natural justice.

Natural justice generally binds both public and private entities, while the U.S. concept of due process has a "state action" requirement which means it applies only to state actors. But in the U.S., there are analogous concepts like fair procedure which can bind private parties in their relations with others.

== See also ==
- Abuse of process
- Distributive justice
- Interactional justice
- Judicial reform
- Judicial review
- Justice delayed is justice denied
- Organizational justice
- Perverting the course of justice
- Service recovery paradox

== Bibliography ==
- Tom R. Tyler, Why People Obey the Law. Yale University Press. (1990)
- Robert Bone, Agreeing to Fair Process: The Problem with Contractarian Theories of Procedural Fairness, 83 Boston University Law Review 485 (2003).
- Ronald Dworkin, Principle, Policy, Procedure in A Matter of Principle (1985).
- Louis Kaplow, The Value of Accuracy in Adjudication: An Economic Analysis, 23 Journal of Legal Studies 307 (1994).
- Bruce Hay, Procedural Justice--Ex Ante vs. Ex Post, 44 UCLA Law Review 1803 (1997).
- John Rawls, A Theory of Justice (1971).
- Lawrence Solum, Procedural Justice (2004).
- Soon Lay Khuan. (2007). Organizational Justice as an Antecedent of Job Performance. International journal of business, 325-343.
- Jeffre W. Kassing. (2008). Disagreeing about what's Fair: Exploring the Relationship between Perceptions of Justice and Employee Dissent. Communication research reports, 34-43.
- Victoria A. Cave. (2005). Motivating The Factors: Perceptions of Justice and their Relationship with Managerial and Organizational Trust in Australia. Communication and mass media complete, 47-70.
