= Drug test =

Technical analysis of a biological specimen

- MeSH: D015813

A drug test (also often toxicology screen or tox screen) is a technical analysis of a biological specimen, for example urine, hair, blood, breath, sweat, or oral fluid/saliva—to determine the presence or absence of specified parent drugs or their metabolites. Major applications of drug testing include detection of the presence of performance enhancing steroids in sport, employers and parole/probation officers screening for drugs prohibited by law (such as cocaine, methamphetamine, and heroin) and police officers testing for the presence and concentration of alcohol (ethanol) in the blood commonly referred to as BAC (blood alcohol content). BAC tests are typically administered via a breathalyzer while urinalysis is used for the vast majority of drug testing in sports and the workplace. Numerous other methods with varying degrees of accuracy, sensitivity (detection threshold/cutoff), and detection periods exist.

A drug test may also refer to a test that provides quantitative chemical analysis of an illegal drug, typically intended to help with responsible drug use.

== Detection periods ==
The detection windows depend upon multiple factors: drug class, amount and frequency of use, metabolic rate, body mass, age, overall health, and urine pH. For ease of use, the detection times of metabolites have been incorporated into each parent drug. For example, heroin and cocaine can only be detected for a few hours after use, but their metabolites can be detected for several days in urine. The chart depicts the longer detection times of the metabolites. In the case of hair testing, the metabolites are permanently embedded into hair, and the detection time is determined by the length of the hair sample used in the analysis. The standard length of head hair used in the test is 1.5", which corresponds to about 3 months. Body/pubic hair grows slower, and the same 1.5" would result in a longer detection time.

Oral fluid or saliva testing results for the most part mimic that of blood. The only exceptions are THC (tetrahydrocannabinol) and benzodiazepines. Oral fluid will likely detect THC from ingestion up to a maximum period of 6–12 hours. This continues to cause difficulty in oral fluid detection of THC and benzodiazepines.

Breath air for the most part mimics blood tests as well. Due to the very low levels of substances in the breath air, liquid chromatography–mass spectrometry has to be used to analyze the sample according to a recent publication wherein 12 analytes were investigated.

Rapid oral fluid products are not approved for use in workplace drug testing programs and are not FDA cleared. Using rapid oral fluid drug tests in the workplace is prohibited in only:

- California
- Kansas
- Maine
- Minnesota
- New York
- Vermont

The following chart gives approximate detection periods for each substance by test type.

Approximate values for detection periods
Substance	Urine	Hair	Blood / Oral Fluid
Alcohol	6–24 hours Note: Alcohol tests may measure ethyl glucuronide, which can stay in urine for up to 80 hours	up to 90 days	12 to 24 hours
Amphetamines (except methamphetamine)	1 to 4 days	up to 90 days	12 hours
Methamphetamine	1 to 5 days	up to 90 days	1 to 3 days
MDMA (Ecstasy)	3 to 5 days	up to 90 days	3 to 4 days
Barbiturates (except phenobarbital)	1–4 days or 2–3 weeks	up to 90 days	1 to 2 days
Phenobarbital	2 to 3 weeks	up to 90 days	4 to 7 days
Benzodiazepines	Therapeutic use: up to 7 days. Chronic use (over one year): 4 to 6 weeks	up to 90 days	6 to 48 hours
Cannabis	Passive inhalation: up to 22 minutes** Infrequent users: 7–10 Days; Heavy users: 30 to 100 days	up to 90 days	2 to 3 days in blood of infrequent users, up to 2 weeks in blood of heavy users However, it depends on whether actual THC or THC metabolites are being tested for, the latter having a much longer detection time than the former. THC (found in marijuana) may only be detectable in saliva/oral fluid for 2 to 24 hours in most cases, though in rare cases has been detected up to 28 days after consumption.
Cocaine	2 to 4 days (with exceptions for heavy users who can test positive up to 4/6 weeks, and individuals with certain kidney disorders)	up to 90 days	2–10 days, heavy users or individuals with previous substance use 6/8 weeks
Codeine	2 to 3 days	up to 90 days	1 to 4 days
Cotinine (a breakdown product of nicotine)	2 to 4 days	up to 90 days	2 to 4 days
Morphine	2 to 3 days	up to 90 days	1 to 3 days
Tricyclic antidepressants (TCA's)	7 to 10 days		Detectable but dose relationship not established.
LSD	1–4 days (including metabolites)	up to 90 days	2 to 4 days
Methadone	3 days	up to 90 days	24 hours
Steroids	3 to 30 days		
PCP	3 to 7 days for single use; up to 30 days in chronic users	up to 90 days	1 to 3 days

== Types ==
=== Urine drug screen ===
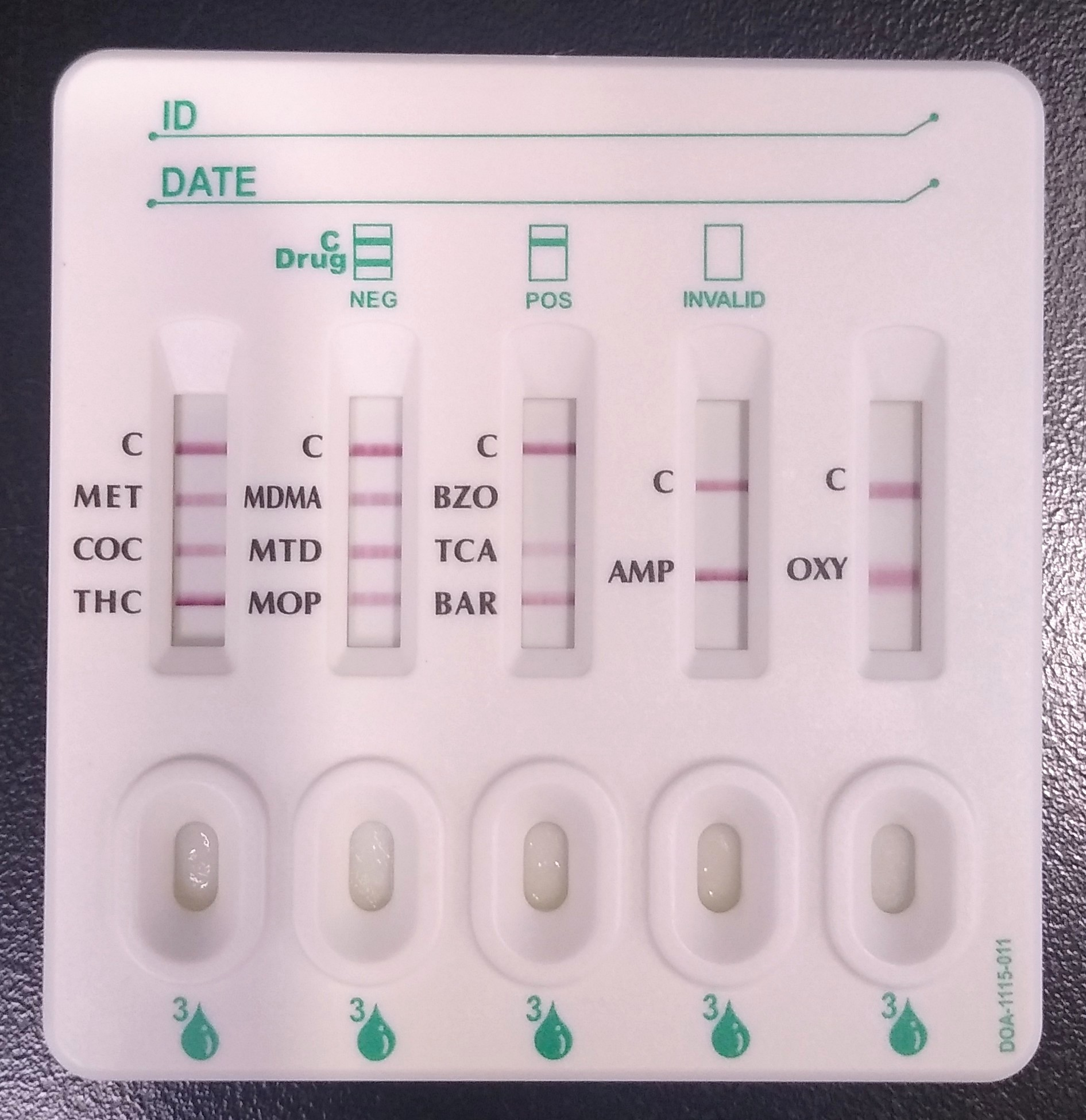
Example of a lateral-flow device used to screen urine for drugs. There is no line present at the benzodiazepine area, indicating a positive screen for this class of drugs. Other drugs, and the negative control (labelled "C"), are negative.

Urine analysis is primarily used because of its low cost. Urine drug testing is one of the most common testing methods used. The enzyme-multiplied immune test is the most frequently used urinalysis. Complaints have been made about the relatively high rates of false positives using this test.

Urine drug tests screen the urine for the presence of a parent drug or its metabolites. The level of drug or its metabolites is not predictive of when the drug was taken or how much the patient used.

Urine drug testing is an immunoassay based on the principle of competitive binding. Drugs which may be present in the urine specimen compete against their respective drug conjugate for binding sites on their specific antibody. During testing, a urine specimen migrates upward by capillary action. A drug, if present in the urine specimen below its cut-off concentration, will not saturate the binding sites of its specific antibody. The antibody will then react with the drug-protein conjugate and a visible colored line will show up in the test line region of the specific drug strip.

A common misconception is that a drug test that is testing for a class of drugs, for example, opioids, will detect all drugs of that class. However, most opioid tests will not reliably detect oxycodone, oxymorphone, meperidine, or fentanyl. Likewise, most benzodiazepine drug tests will not reliably detect lorazepam. However, urine drug screens that test for a specific drug, rather than an entire class, are often available.

When an employer requests a drug test from an employee, or a physician requests a drug test from a patient, the employee or patient is typically instructed to go to a collection site or their home. The urine sample goes through a specified 'chain of custody' to ensure that it is not tampered with or invalidated through lab or employee error. The patient or employee's urine is collected at a remote location in a specially designed secure cup, sealed with tamper-resistant tape, and sent to a testing laboratory to be screened for drugs (typically the Substance Abuse and Mental Health Services Administration 5 panel). The first step at the testing site is to split the urine into two aliquots. One aliquot is first screened for drugs using an analyzer that performs immunoassay as the initial screen. To ensure the specimen integrity and to detect possible adulterants, additional parameters are tested for. Some test the properties of normal urine, such as, urine creatinine, pH, and specific gravity. Others are intended to catch substances added to the urine to alter the test result, such as, oxidants (including bleach), nitrites, and gluteraldehyde. If the urine screen is positive then another aliquot of the sample is used to confirm the findings by gas chromatography—mass spectrometry (GC-MS) or liquid chromatography - mass spectrometry methodology. If requested by the physician or employer, certain drugs are screened for individually; these are generally drugs part of a chemical class that are, for one of many reasons, considered more habit-forming or of concern. For instance, oxycodone and diamorphine may be tested, both sedative analgesics. If such a test is not requested specifically, the more general test (in the preceding case, the test for opioids) will detect most of the drugs of a class, but the employer or physician will not have the benefit of the identity of the drug.

Employment-related test results are relayed to a medical review office (MRO) where a medical physician reviews the results. If the result of the screen is negative, the MRO informs the employer that the employee has no detectable drug in the urine, typically within 24 hours. However, if the test result of the immunoassay and GC-MS are non-negative and show a concentration level of parent drug or metabolite above the established limit, the MRO contacts the employee to determine if there is any legitimate reason—such as a medical treatment or prescription.

On-site instant drug testing is a more cost-efficient method of effectively detecting substance use amongst employees, as well as in rehabilitation programs to monitor patient progress. These instant tests can be used for both urine and saliva testing. Although the accuracy of such tests varies with the manufacturer, some kits have rates of accuracy correlating closely with laboratory test results.

=== Breath test ===
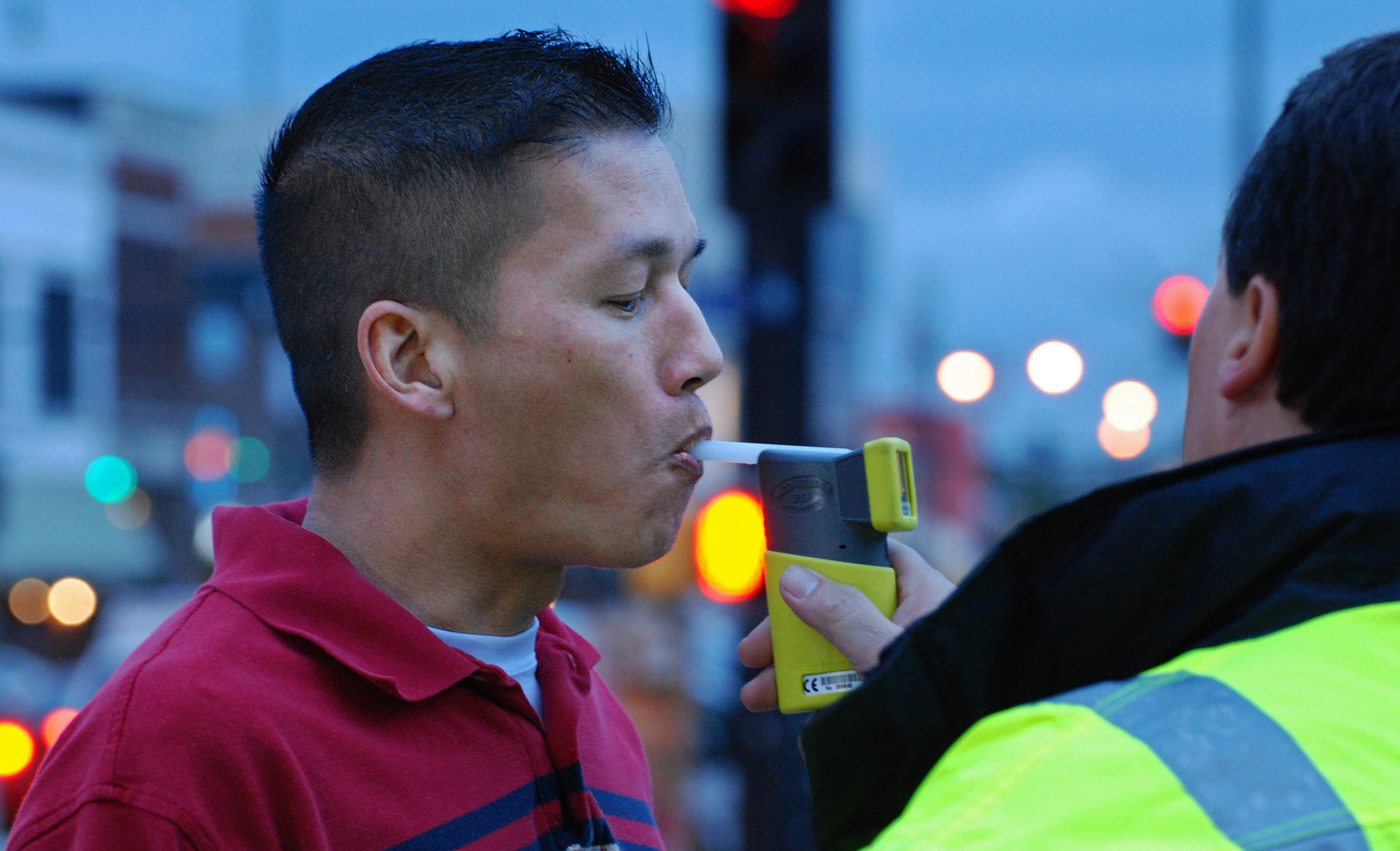
Breath test being used on a volunteer.

Breath testing is a widespread method for quickly determining alcohol intoxication. A breath test measures the alcohol concentration in the body by a deep-lung breath. There are different instruments used for measuring the alcohol content of an individual though their breath. A Breathalyzer is a widely known instrument which was developed in 1954 and contained chemicals unlike other breath-testing instruments. More modern instruments include infrared light-absorption devices and fuel cell detectors.

To get accurate readings on a breath-testing device the individual must blow for approximately 6 seconds and need to contain roughly 1.1 to 1.5 liters of breath. For a breath test to provide an accurate result an operator must take steps such as avoiding measuring "mouth alcohol" which is a result from regurgitation, belching, or recent intake of an alcoholic beverage. To avoid measuring "mouth alcohol" the operator must not allow the individual being tested to consume any materials for at least fifteen minutes before the breath test. In the United States, a driver who refuses to take a breath test can have their driver's license suspended for a period of 6 to 12 months.

=== Hair testing ===
Hair analysis to detect addictive substances has been used by court systems in the United States, United Kingdom, Canada, and other countries worldwide. In the United States, hair testing has been accepted in court cases as forensic evidence following the Frye Rule, the Federal Rules of Evidence, and the Daubert Rule. As such, hair testing results are legally and scientifically recognized as admissible evidence. Hair testing is commonly used in the USA as pre-employment drug test. The detection time for this test is roughly 3 months, which is the time, that takes head hair to grow ca. 1.5 inches, that are collected as a specimen. Longer detection times are possible with longer hair samples.

A 2014 collaborative US study of 359 adults with moderate-risk drug use found, that a large number of participants, who reported drug use in the last 3 months, had negative hair tests. The tests were done using an immunoassay followed by a confirmatory GC-MS. For marijuana, only about half of self-disclosed users had a positive hair test. Under-identification of drug use by hair testing (or over-reporting) was also widespread for cocaine, amphetamines, and opioids. Because such under-identification was more common among participants, who self-reported an infrequent use, the authors suggested, that the immunoassay did not have the sensitivity required for such infrequent uses. It is worth noting, that most earlier studies reported, that hair tests found ca. 50-fold higher prevalence of illicit drug use, than self reports.

In late 2022 the US Federal Motor Carrier Safety Administration denied a petition to recognize hair samples as an alternative (to the currently used urine samples) drug-testing method for truckers. The agency did not comment on the test validity, but rather stated, that it lacks the statutory authority to adopt new analytical methods.

Although some lower courts may have accepted hair test evidence, there is no controlling judicial ruling in either the federal or any state system declaring any type of hair test as reliable.

Hair testing is now recognized in both the UK and US judicial systems. There are guidelines for hair testing that have been published by the Society of Hair Testing (a private company in France) that specify the markers to be tested for and the cutoff concentrations that need to be tested. Addictive substances that can be detected include Cannabis, Cocaine, Amphetamines and drugs new to the UK such as Mephedrone.

==== Alcohol ====
In contrast to other drugs consumed, alcohol is deposited directly in the hair. For this reason the investigation procedure looks for direct products of ethanol metabolism. The main part of alcohol is oxidized in the human body. This means it is released as water and carbon dioxide. One part of the alcohol reacts with fatty acids to produce esters. The sum of the concentrations of four of these fatty acid ethyl esters (FAEEs: ethyl myristate, ethyl palmitate, ethyl oleate and ethyl stearate) are used as indicators of the alcohol consumption. The amounts found in hair are measured in nanograms (one nanogram equals only one billionth of a gram), however with the benefit of modern technology, it is possible to detect such small amounts. In the detection of ethyl glucuronide, or EtG, testing can detect amounts in picograms (one picogram equals 0.001 nanograms).

However, there is one major difference between most drugs and alcohol metabolites in the way in which they enter into the hair: on the one hand like other drugs FAEEs enter into the hair via the keratinocytes, the cells responsible for hair growth. These cells form the hair in the root and then grow through the skin surface taking any substances with them. On the other hand, the sebaceous glands produce FAEEs in the scalp and these migrate together with the sebum along the hair shaft (Auwärter et al., 2001, Pragst et al., 2004). So these glands lubricate not only the part of the hair that is just growing at 0.3 mm per day on the skin surface, but also the more mature hair growth, providing it with a protective layer of fat.

FAEEs (nanogram = one billionth of a gram) appear in hair in almost one order of magnitude lower than (the relevant order of magnitude of) EtG (picogram = one trillionth of a gram). It has been technically possible to measure FAEEs since 1993, and the first study reporting the detection of EtG in hair was done by Sachs in 1993.

In practice, most hair which is sent for analysis has been cosmetically treated in some way (bleached, permed etc.). It has been proven that FAEEs are not significantly affected by such treatments (Hartwig et al., 2003a). FAEE concentrations in hair from other body sites can be interpreted in a similar fashion as scalp hair (Hartwig et al., 2003b).

=== Presumptive substance testing ===
Presumptive substance tests attempt to identify a suspicious substance, material or surface where traces of drugs are thought to be, instead of testing individuals through biological methods such as urine or hair testing. The test involves mixing the suspicious material with a chemical in order to trigger a color change to indicate if a drug is present. Most are now available over-the-counter for consumer use, and do not require a lab to read results.

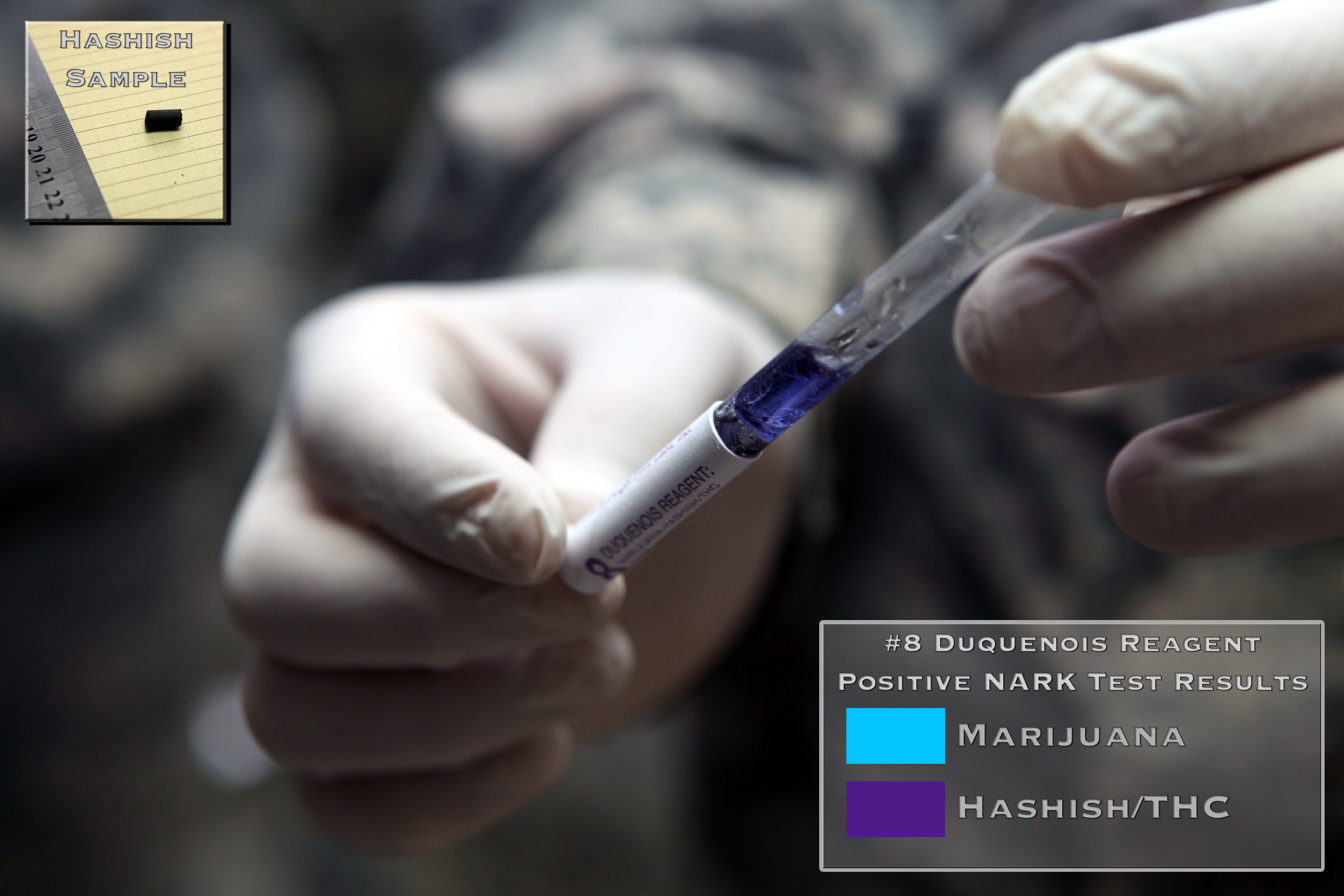
Duquenois reagent

Benefits to this method include that the person who is suspected of drug use does not need to be confronted or aware of testing. Only a very small amount of material is needed to obtain results, and can be used to test powder, pills, capsules, crystals, or organic material. There is also the ability to detect illicit material when mixed with other non-illicit materials. The tests are used for general screening purposes, offering a generic result for the presence of a wide range of drugs, including heroin, cocaine, methamphetamine, amphetamine, ecstasy/MDMA, methadone, ketamine, PCP, PMA, DMT, MDPV, and may detect rapidly evolving synthetic designer drugs. Separate tests for cannabis are also available.

There are five primary color-test reagents used for general screening purposes. The Marquis reagent turns into a variety of colors when in the presence of different substances. Dille-Koppanyi reagent uses two chemical solutions which turns a violet-blue color in the presence of barbiturates. Duquenois-Levine reagent is a series of chemical solutions that turn to the color of purple when the vegetation of marijuana is added. Van Urk reagent turns blue-purple when in the presence of LSD. Scott test's chemical solution shows up as a faint blue for cocaine base.

In recent years, the use of presumptive test kits in the criminal justice system has come under great scrutiny due to the lack to forensic studies, questioned reliability, rendering of false positives with legal substances, and wrongful arrests.

=== Saliva drug screen / Oral fluid-based drug screen ===
Saliva / oral fluid-based drug tests can generally detect use during the previous few days. It is better at detecting very recent use of a substance. THC may only be detectable for 2–24 hours in most cases. On site drug tests are allowed per the Department of Labor.

Detection in saliva tests begins almost immediately upon use of the following substances, and lasts for approximately the following times:

- Alcohol: 6-12 h
- Marijuana: 1-24h

A disadvantage of saliva based drug testing is that it is not approved by FDA or SAMHSA for use with DOT / Federal Mandated Drug Testing. Oral fluid is not considered a bio-hazard unless there is visible blood; however, it should be treated with care.

=== Sweat drug screen ===
Sweat patches are attached to the skin to collect sweat over a long period of time (up to 14 days). These are used by child protective services, parole departments, and other government institutions concerned with drug use over long periods, when urine testing is not practical.

There are also surface drug tests that test for the metabolite of parent drug groups in the residue of drugs left in sweat. An example of a rapid, non-invasive, sweat-based drug test is fingerprint drug screening. This 10 minute fingerprint test is in use by a variety of organisations in the UK and beyond, including within workplaces, drug treatment and family safeguarding services at airport border control (to detect drug mules) and in mortuaries to assist in investigations into cause of death.

=== Blood ===
Drug-testing a blood sample measures whether or not a drug or a metabolite is in the body at a particular time. These types of tests are considered to be the most accurate way of telling if a person is intoxicated. Blood drug tests are not used very often because they need specialized equipment and medically trained administrators.

Depending on how much marijuana was consumed, it can usually be detected in blood tests within six hours of consumption. After six hours has passed, the concentration of marijuana in the blood decreases significantly. It generally disappears completely within 30 days.

=== Random drug testing ===
Can occur at any time, usually when the investigator has reason to believe that a substance is possibly being used by the subject by behavior or immediately after an employee-related incident occurs during work hours. Testing protocol typically conforms to the national medical standard, candidates are given up to 120 minutes to reasonably produce a urine sample from the time of commencement (in some instances this time frame may be extended at the examiner's discretion).

=== Diagnostic screening ===
In the case of life-threatening symptoms, unconsciousness, or bizarre behavior in an emergency situation, screening for common drugs and toxins may help find the cause, called a toxicology test or tox screen to denote the broader area of possible substances beyond just self-administered drugs. These tests can also be done post-mortem during an autopsy in cases where a death was not expected. The test is usually done within 96 hours (4 days) after the desire for the test is realized. Both a urine sample and a blood sample may be tested. A blood sample is routinely used to detect ethanol/methanol and ASA/paracetamol intoxication. Various panels are used for screening urine samples for common substances, e.g. triage 8 that detects amphetamines, benzodiazepines, cocaine, methadone, opiates, cannabis, barbiturates and tricyclic antidepressants. Results are given in 10–15 min.

Similar screenings may be used to evaluate the possible use of date rape drugs. This is usually done on a urine sample.

=== Optional harm reduction scheme ===
Drug checks/tests (also known as pill testing) are provided at some events such as concerts and music festivals. Attendees can voluntarily hand over a sample of any drug or drugs in their possession to be tested to check what the drug is and its purity. The scheme is used as a harm reduction technique so people are more aware of what they are taking and the potential risks.

=== Occupational harm reduction strategies ===
Drug and alcohol impairment while at work increases the risk of work-place accidents and decreases productivity. Employers such as the commercial driving and airline industry may conduct random drug tests on employees with the goal of deterring use to improve safety. There is some evidence that increasing the use of random drug testing in the airline industry reduces the percentage of people who test positive, however, it is unclear if this decrease is associated with a corresponding decrease in fatal or non-fatal injuries, other accidents, number of days absent from work. It is also not clear if there are other unwanted side effects that may result from random drug and alcohol testing in the workplace.

== Commonly tested substances ==
=== Anabolic steroids ===
Anabolic steroids are used to enhance performance in sports and as they are prohibited in most high-level competitions drug testing is used extensively in order to enforce this prohibition. This is particularly so in individual (rather than team) sports such as athletics and cycling.

== Methodologies ==
Before testing samples, the tamper-evident seal is checked for integrity. If it appears to have been tampered with or damaged, the laboratory rejects the sample and does not test it.

Next, the sample must be made testable. Urine and oral fluid can be used "as is" for some tests, but other tests require the drugs to be extracted from urine. Strands of hair, patches, and blood must be prepared before testing. Hair is washed in order to eliminate second-hand sources of drugs on the surface of the hair, then the keratin is broken down using enzymes. Blood plasma may need to be separated by centrifuge from blood cells prior to testing. Sweat patches are opened and the sweat collection component is removed and soaked in a solvent to dissolve any drugs present.

Laboratory-based drug testing is done in two steps. The first step is the screening test, which is an immunoassay based test applied to all samples. The second step, known as the confirmation test, is usually undertaken by a laboratory using highly specific chromatographic techniques and only applied to samples that test positive during the screening test. Screening tests are usually done by immunoassay (EMIT, ELISA, and RIA are the most common). A "dipstick" drug testing method which could provide screening test capabilities to field investigators has been developed at the University of Illinois.

After a suspected positive sample is detected during screening, the sample is tested using a confirmation test. Samples that are negative on the screening test are discarded and reported as negative. The confirmation test in most laboratories (and all SAMHSA certified labs) is performed using mass spectrometry, and is precise but expensive. False positive samples from the screening test will almost always be negative on the confirmation test. Samples testing positive during both screening and confirmation tests are reported as positive to the entity that ordered the test. Most laboratories save positive samples for some period of months or years in the event of a disputed result or lawsuit. For workplace drug testing, a positive result is generally not confirmed without a review by a Medical Review Officer who will normally interview the subject of the drug test.

=== Urine drug testing ===
Urine drug test kits are available as on-site tests, or laboratory analysis. Urinalysis is the most common test type and used by federally mandated drug testing programs and is considered the Gold Standard of drug testing. Urine based tests have been upheld in most courts for more than 30 years. However, urinalysis conducted by the Department of Defense has been challenged for reliability of testing the metabolite of cocaine. There are two associated metabolites of cocaine, benzoylecgonine (BZ) and ecgonine methyl ester (EME), the first (BZ) is created by the presence of cocaine in an aqueous solution with a pH greater than 7.0, while the second (EME) results from the actual human metabolic process. The presence of EME confirms actual ingestion of cocaine by a human being, while the presence of BZ is indicative only. BZ without EME is evidence of sample contamination, however, the US Department of Defense has chosen not to test for EME in its urinalysis program.

A number of different analyses (defined as the unknown substance being tested for) are available on Urine Drug Screens.

=== Spray drug testing ===
Spray (sweat) drug test kits are non-invasive. It is a simple process to collect the required specimen, no bathroom is needed, no laboratory is required for analysis, and the tests themselves are difficult to manipulate and relatively tamper-resistant. The detection window is long and can detect recent drug use within several hours.

There are also some disadvantages to spray or sweat testing. There is not much variety in these drug tests, only a limited number of drugs can be detected, prices tend to be higher, and inconclusive results can be produced by variations in sweat production rates in donors. They also have a relatively long specimen collection period and are more vulnerable to contamination than other common forms of testing.

=== Hair drug testing ===
Hair drug testing is a method that can detect drug use over a much longer period of time than saliva, sweat or urine tests. Hair testing is also more robust with respect to tampering. Thus, hair sampling is preferred by the US military and by many large corporations, which are subject to Drug-Free Workplace Act of 1988.

Head hair normally growth at the rate of 0.5 inches per month. Thus, the most common hair sample length of 1.5" from the scalp would detect drug use within the last 90-100 days. 80-120 strands of hair are sufficient for the test. In the absence of hair on the head, body hair can be used as an acceptable substitute. This includes facial hair, the underarms, arms, and legs or even pubic hair. Because body hair usually grows slower than head hair, drugs can often be detected in body hair for longer periods, e.g. up to 12 months.

Most drugs are analysed in hair samples not as the original psychoactive molecules, but rather as their metabolytes. For example, ethanol is determined as ethyl glucuronide, while cocaine use is confirmed using ecgonine. Testing for metabolytes reduces the likelihood of false positive results due to contamination. One disadvantage of hair testing is, that it cannot detect recent drug use, because it takes at least a week after a drug intake for the metabolytes to show up in a growing hair above the skin. Urine tests are better suited for detecting recent (within a week) drug use.

In a practical test, hair sample is usually washed with a low polarity solvent (such as dichloromethane) to remove surface contaminations. Then, the sample is pulverized and extracted with a more polar solvent, such as methanol.

Although thousand different substances can be determined in a single gas chromatography–mass spectrometry or liquid chromatography–mass spectrometry experiment, due to the low concentration of analytes, practical measurements (see selective ion monitoring) are limited to a smaller number (10-20) of analytes. Designer drugs are usually missed in such measurements, because the analyst must know in advance what chemicals to look for.

Most hair testing laboratories use the aforementioned chromato-mass-spectrometry methods for confirmation or for rarely tested drugs only. Mass screening (preliminary or final) is usually done with immunoassays, because of their lower cost.

== Legality, ethics and politics ==
The results of federally mandating drug testing were similar to the effects of simply extending to the trucking industry the right to perform drug tests, and it has been argued that the latter approach would have been as effective at lower cost.

Psychologist Tony Buon has criticized the use of workplace drug testing on a number of grounds, including:

1. Flawed technology: The real world performance of testing is much lower than that claimed by its promoters. Buon suggest that tests are probably adequate for rehabilitation and treatment situations, possibly adequate for pre-employment situations, but not for dismissing employees.
2. Ethical Issues: Because of the fairly simple ways that an employee can invalidate the test, drug testing must be strictly monitored. This means that the specimen must be observed leaving the body. Many legal objections currently being raised in the courts about drug testing are pointing to legal requirements of prior notice, consent, due process, and cause.
3. Wrong focus: As has been shown with Employee Assistance Programs, the focus of management concern should be on work performance decline. Buon suggests effective management practices are an infinitely better approach to managing workplace alcohol and other drug issues.

Tony Buon has also reported by the CIPD as stating that "drug testing captures the stupid—experienced drug users know how to beat the tests".

From a penological standpoint, one purpose of drug testing is to help classify the people taking the drug test within risk groups so that those who pose more of a danger to the public can be incapacitated through incarceration or other restrictions on liberty. Thus, the drug testing serves a crime control purpose even if there is no expectation of rehabilitating the drug user through treatment, deterring drug use through sanctions, or sending a message that drug use is a deviant behavior that will not be tolerated.

=== United Kingdom ===
A study in 2004 by the Independent Inquiry into Drug Testing at Work found that attempts by employers to force employees to take drug tests could potentially be challenged as a violation of privacy under the Human Rights Act 1998 and Article 8 of the European Convention of Human Rights. However, this does not apply to industries where drug testing is a matter of personal and public safety or security rather than productivity.

=== United States ===
In consultation with Dr. Carlton Turner, President Ronald Reagan issued Executive Order 12564. In doing so, he instituted mandatory drug-testing for all safety-sensitive executive-level and civil-service Federal employees. This was challenged in the courts by the National Treasury Employees Union. In 1988, this challenge was considered by the US Supreme Court. A similar challenge resulted in the Court extending the drug-free workplace concept to the private sector. These decisions were then incorporated into the White House Drug Control Strategy directive issued by President George H.W. Bush in 1989. All defendants serving on federal probation or federal supervised release are required to submit to at least three drug tests. Failing a drug test can be construed as possession of a controlled substance, resulting in mandatory revocation and imprisonment.

There have been inconsistent evaluation results as to whether continued pretrial drug testing has beneficial effects.

Testing positive can lead to bail not being granted, or if bail has already been granted, to bail revocation or other sanctions. Arizona also adopted a law in 1987 authorizing mandatory drug testing of felony arrestees for the purpose of informing the pretrial release decision, and the District of Columbia has had a similar law since the 1970s. It has been argued that one of the problems with such testing is that there is often not enough time between the arrest and the bail decision to confirm positive results using GC/MS technology. It has also been argued that such testing potentially implicates the Fifth Amendment privilege against self-incrimination, the right to due process (including the prohibition against gathering evidence in a manner that shocks the conscience or constitutes outrageous government conduct), and the prohibition against unreasonable searches and seizures contained in the Fourth Amendment.

According to Henriksson, the anti-drug appeals of the Reagan administration "created an environment in which many employers felt compelled to implement drug testing programs because failure to do so might be perceived as condoning drug use. This fear was easily exploited by aggressive marketing and sales forces, who often overstated the value of testing and painted a bleak picture of the consequences of failing to use the drug testing product or service being offered." On March 10, 1986, the Commission on Organized Crime asked all U.S. companies to test employees for drug use. By 1987, nearly 25% of the Fortune 500 companies used drug tests.

According to an uncontrolled self-report study done by DATIA and Society for Human Resource Management in 2012 (sample of 6,000 randomly selected human resource professionals), human resource professionals reported the following results after implementing a drug testing program: 19% of companies reported a subjective increase in employee productivity, 16% reported a decrease in employee turnover (8% reported an increase), and unspecified percentages reported decreases in absenteeism and improvement of workers' compensation incidence rates.

According to US Chamber of Commerce 70% of all illicit drug users are employed. Some industries have high rates of employee drug use such as construction (12.8%), repair (11.1%), and hospitality (7.9-16.3%).

=== Australia ===
A person conducting a business or undertaking (PCBU—the new term that includes employers) has duties under the work health and safety (WHS) legislation to ensure a worker affected by alcohol or other drugs does not place themselves or other persons at risk of injury while at work. Workplace policies and prevention programs can help change the norms and culture around substance use.

All organisations—large and small—can benefit from an agreed policy on alcohol and drug misuse that applies to all workers. Such a policy should form part of an organisations overall health and safety management system. PCBUs are encouraged to establish a policy and procedure, in consultation with workers, to constructively manage alcohol and other drug related hazards in their workplace. A comprehensive workplace alcohol and other drug policy should apply to everyone in the workplace and include prevention, education, counselling and rehabilitation arrangements. In addition, the roles and responsibilities of managers and supervisors should be clearly outlined.

All Australian workplace drug testing must comply with Australian standard AS/NZS4308:2008.

In Victoria, roadside saliva tests detect drugs that contain:

- THC (Delta-9 tetrahydrocannabinol), the active component in cannabis.
- methamphetamine, also known as "ice", "crystal" and "crank".
- MDMA (Methylenedioxymethamphetamine), which is known as ecstasy.

In February 2016 a New South Wales magistrate "acquitted a man who tested positive for cannabis". He had been arrested and charged after testing positive during a roadside drug test, despite not having smoked for nine days. He was relying on advice previously given to him by police.

== Refusal ==
In the United States federal criminal system, refusing to take a drug test triggers an automatic revocation of probation or supervised release.

In Victoria, Australia the driver of the car has the option to refuse the drug test. Refusing to undergo a drug test or refusing to undergo a secondary drug test after the first one, triggers an automatic suspension and disqualification for a period of two years and a fine of AUD$1000. The second refusal triggers an automatic suspension and disqualification for a period of four years and an even larger fine.

=== Historical cases ===
- In 2000 an Australian mining company, South Blackwater Coal Ltd, with 400 employees, imposed drug-testing procedures. The trade unions advised their members to refuse to take the tests, partly because a positive result does not necessarily indicate present impairment. The workers were stood-down by the company without pay for a week.
- In 2003, sixteen members of the Chicago White Sox considered refusing to take a drug test, in hopes of making steroid testing mandatory.
- In 2006, Levy County, Florida, volunteer librarians resigned en masse rather than take drug tests.
- In 2010, Iranian super heavyweight class weightlifters refused to submit to a drug test authorized by the Iran Weightlifting League.

== See also ==
- Cannabis drug tests
- Detoxification
- Drug checking
- Drug testing welfare recipients
- Drug-Free Workplace Act of 1988
- Equine drug testing
- Forensic toxicology
- Human Intervention Motivation Study
- Lacing (drugs)
- Occupational health concerns of cannabis use
- Poppy seed defence
- Presumptive and confirmatory tests
- Reagent testing
- School district drug policies
- Urinalysis
