= Workplace bullying =

Harmful mistreatment of others in the workplace

Workplace bullying is a persistent pattern of mistreatment from others in the workplace that causes physical or emotional harm. It includes verbal, nonverbal, psychological, and physical abuse, as well as humiliation. It's considered abuse that is particularly intentional. This type of workplace aggression is particularly difficult because unlike typical school bullies, workplace bullies often operate within the established rules and policies of their organizations and society. In most cases, workplace bullying is carried out by someone who is in a position of authority over the victim. However, bullies can also be peers or subordinates. The participation of subordinates in bullying is referred to as upward bullying. The least visible form of workplace bullying involves upward bullying where bullying tactics are manipulated and applied against a superior, often for strategically motivated outcomes.

Researchers have also investigated the impact of bullying in a larger organizational context, as well as the group-level dynamics that contribute to the occurrence and persistence of bullying behavior. Bullying can be covert or overt, and sometimes go unnoticed by superiors while also being widely known throughout an organization. The negative effects of workplace bullying are not limited to the targeted individuals, and can lead to a decline in employee morale and shifts in organizational culture. Workplace bullying can also manifest as overbearing supervision, constant criticism and obstruction of promotions.

== Definitions ==
Although there is no universally accepted formal definition of workplace bullying, and some researchers question whether a single, uniform definition is possible due to its complex and multifaceted forms, several researchers have attempted to define it:

- According to the widely used definition from Olweus, "[Workplace bullying is] a situation in which one or more persons systematically and over a long period of time perceive themselves to be on the receiving end of negative treatment on the part of one or more persons, in a situation in which the person(s) exposed to the treatment has difficulty in defending themselves against this treatment."
- According to Einarsen, Hoel, Zapf and Cooper, "Bullying at work means harassing, offending, socially excluding someone, or negatively affecting someone's work tasks. In order for the label bullying (or mobbing) to be applied to a particular activity, interaction, or process, it has to occur repeatedly and regularly (e.g. weekly) and over a period of time (e.g. about six months). Bullying is an escalated process in the course of which the person confronted ends up in an inferior position and becomes the target of systematic negative social acts."
- According to Tracy, Lutgen-Sandvik, and Alberts, researchers associated with the Arizona State University's Project for Wellness and Work-Life, workplace bullying is most often "a combination of tactics in which numerous types of hostile communication and behaviour are used."
- Gary and Ruth Namie define workplace bullying as "repeated, health-harming mistreatment, verbal abuse, or conduct which is threatening, humiliating, intimidating, or sabotage that interferes with work or some combination of the three."
- Pamela Lutgen-Sandvik expands this definition, stating that workplace bullying is "persistent verbal and nonverbal aggression at work, that includes personal attacks, social ostracism, and a multitude of other painful messages and hostile interactions."
- Catherine Mattice and Karen Garman define workplace bullying as "systematic aggressive communication, manipulation of work, and acts aimed at humiliating or degrading one or more individual that create an unhealthy and unprofessional power imbalance between bully and target(s), result in psychological consequences for targets and co-workers, and cost enormous monetary damage to an organization's bottom line"
- Dr. Jan Kircher attempts to redefine workplace bullying, what she calls persistent workplace aggression, as an issue thought primarily about through the lens of individual conflict to an issue of organizational culture, arguing, "One of the biggest misconceptions that people have about workplace bullying it that it is similar to conflict and therefore, persistent workplace aggression is handled like conflict." However, according to Kircher, this approach is detrimental, and actually prevents organizations from being able to effectively prevent, handle or resolve bullying situations in the work environment.
- The most common type of complaint filed with the U.S. Equal Employment Opportunity Commission involves retaliation, where an employer harasses or bullies an employee for objecting to illegal discrimination. Patricia Barnes, author of Surviving Bullies, Queen Bees & Psychopaths in the Workplace, argues that employers that bully are a critical but often overlooked aspect of the problem in the United States.

Because it can occur in a variety of contexts and forms, it is also useful to define workplace bullying by the key features that these behaviours share. Bullying is characterized by:

- Repetition (occurs regularly)
- Duration (is enduring)
- Escalation (increasing aggression)
- Power disparity (the target lacks the power to successfully defend themselves)
- Attributed intent

This distinguishes bullying from isolated behaviours and other forms of job stress and allows the term workplace bullying to be applied in various contexts and to behaviours that meet these characteristics. Many observers agree that bullying is often a repetitive behaviour. However, some experts who have dealt with abuse also categorize some events as bullying, for example, with cases where there appear to be severe consequences. Expanding the common understanding of bullying to include single, severe episodes also parallels the legal definitions of sexual harassment in the United States.

According to Pamela Lutgin-Sandvik, the lack of unifying language to name the phenomenon of workplace bullying is a problem because without a unifying term or phrase, individuals have difficulty naming their experiences of abuse, and therefore have trouble pursuing justice against the bully. Unlike sexual harassment, which a specific problem and is now recognized in law of many countries (including the U.S.), workplace bullying is still being established as a relevant social problem and a specific vernacular.

There is no exact definition for bullying behaviours in workplace, which is why different terms and definitions are common. For example, "mobbing" is a commonly used term in Germany, where it refers to a "mob" of bullies, rather than a single bully; this phenomenon is not often seen in other countries. In the United States, the United Kingdom, and Australia, "workplace bullying" is primarily used. While the terms "harassment" and "mobbing" are often used to describe bullying behaviours, "workplace bullying" tends to be the most commonly used term by the research community.

== Statistics ==
Approximately 72% of bullies outrank their victims.

=== Prevalence ===
Research suggests that a significant number of people are exposed to persistent workplace bullying, with a majority of studies reporting a 10 to 15% prevalence in Europe and North America. This figure can vary dramatically upon what definition of workplace bullying is used.

Statistics from the 2007 WBI-Zogby survey show that 13% of U.S. employees report being bullied currently, 24% say they have been bullied in the past and an additional 12% say they have witnessed workplace bullying. Nearly half of all American workers (49%) report that they have been affected by workplace bullying, either being a target themselves or having witnessed abusive behaviour against a co-worker.

Although socioeconomic factors may play a role in the abuse, researchers from the Project for Wellness and Work-Life suggest that "workplace bullying, by definition, is not explicitly connected to demographic markers such as sex and ethnicity".

According to the 2015 National Health Interview Survey Occupational Health Supplement (NHIS-OHS), the national prevalence rate for workers reporting having been threatened, bullied, or harassed by anyone on the job was 7.4%.

In 2008, Dr. Judy Fisher-Blando wrote a doctoral research dissertation on Aggressive behaviour: Workplace Bullying and Its Effect on Job Satisfaction and Productivity. The scientific study determined that almost 75% of employees surveyed had been affected by workplace bullying, whether as a target or a witness. Further research showed the types of bullying behaviour, and organizational support.

=== Gender ===
In terms of gender, the Workplace Bullying Institute (2007) states that women appear to be at greater risk of becoming a bullying target, as 57% of those who reported being targeted for abuse were women. Men are more likely to participate in aggressive bullying behaviour (60%), however when the bully is a woman her target is more likely to be a woman as well (71%).

In 2015, the National Health Interview Survey found a higher prevalence of women (8%) workers who were threatened, bullied, or harassed than men.

However, varying results have been found. The research of Samnani and Singh (2012) reviews the findings from 20 years' literature and claims that inconsistent findings could not support the differences across gender. Carter et al. (2013) found that male staff reported higher prevalence of workplace bullying within UK healthcare.

It is important to consider if there may be gender differences in level of reporting.

=== Race ===
Race also may play a role in the experience of workplace bullying. According to the Workplace Bullying Institute (2007), the comparison of reported combined bullying (current plus ever bullied) prevalence percentages in the USA reveals the pattern from most to least:

1. Hispanics (52.1%)
2. Blacks (46%)
3. Whites (33.5%)
4. Asian (30.6%)

The reported rates of witnessing bullying were:

1. Asian (28.5%)
2. Blacks (21.1%)
3. Hispanics (14%)
4. Whites (10.8%)

The percentages of those reporting that they have neither experienced nor witnessed mistreatment were:

1. Asians (57.3%)
2. Whites (49.7%)
3. Hispanics (32.2%)
4. Blacks (23.4%)

Research psychologist Tony Buon published one of the first reviews of bullying in China in PKU Business Review in 2005.

A University of Cambridge survey found that 88% of Black professionals in the UK reported experiencing racial discrimination at work, highlighting the intersection between racial bias and workplace mistreatment.

=== Marital status ===
Higher prevalence rates for experiencing a hostile work environment were identified for divorced or separated workers compared to married workers, widowed workers, and never married workers.

=== Education ===
Higher prevalence rates for experiencing a hostile work environment were identified for workers with some college education or workers with high school diploma or GED, compared to workers with less than a high school education.

=== Age ===
Lower prevalence rates for experiencing a hostile work environment were identified for workers aged 65 and older compared to workers in other age groups.

With respect to age, conflicting findings have been reported. A study by Einarsen and Skogstad (1996) indicates older employees tend to be more likely to be bullied than younger ones.

=== Industry ===
The prevalence of a hostile work environment varies by industry. In 2015, the broad industry category with the highest prevalence was healthcare and social assistance 10%. According to the Bureau of Labor Statistics, 16,890 workers in the private industry experienced physical trauma from nonfatal workplace violence in 2016.

=== Occupation ===
The prevalence of hostile work environment varies by occupation. In 2015, the occupation groups with the highest prevalence was protective services (24%) and community and social services (15%).

Within UK healthcare, it has been found that 20% of staff have experienced bullying, and 43% witnessed bullying, with managers being the most common source of bullying.

=== Disability ===
In the UK's National Health Service, individuals with disabilities are also at a higher risk of experiencing workplace bullying.

== Profiling ==
Researchers Caitlin Buon and Tony Buon suggest that attempts to profile 'the bully' have been damaging. They state that the "bully" profile is that 'the bully' is always aware of what they are doing, deliberately sets out to harm their 'victims', targets a particular individual or type of person, and has some kind of underlying personality flaw, insecurity, or disorder. But this is unproven and lacks evidence. The researchers suggest referring to workplace bullying as generic harassment along with other forms of non-specific harassment, as this would enable employees to use less emotionally charged language for starting a dialogue about their experiences, rather than being repelled by having to define their experiences as victims. Tony Buon and Caitlin Buon also suggest that the perception and profile of the workplace bully does not facilitate interventions. They suggest that to make significant progress and achieve long-term behaviour change, organisations and individuals need to embrace the notion that everyone potentially houses 'the bully' within them and their organisations. It exists in workplace cultures, belief systems, interactions, and emotional competencies, and cannot be transformed if externalization and demonization further the problem by profiling 'the bully' rather than talking about behaviours and interpersonal interactions.

== Relationship among participants ==
Based on research by H. Hoel and C.L. Cooper, most perpetrators are supervisors. The second most common group is peers, followed by subordinates and customers. The three main relationships among the participants in workplace bullying:

- Between supervisor and subordinate
- Among co-workers
- Employees and customers

Bullying may also occur between an organization and its employees.

Bullying behaviour by supervisors toward subordinates typically manifests as an abuse of power by the supervisor in the workplace. Bullying behaviours by supervisors may be associated with a culture of bullying and the management style of the supervisors. An authoritative management style, specifically, often includes bullying behaviours, which can make subordinates fearful and allow supervisors to bolster their authority over others.

In addition to supervisor – subordinate bullying, bullying behaviours also occur between colleagues. Peers can be either the target or perpetrator. If workplace bullying happens among the co-workers, witnesses will typically choose sides, either with the target or the perpetrator. Perpetrators usually "win" since witnesses do not want to be the next target. This outcome encourages perpetrators to continue their bullying behaviour. In addition, the sense of the injustice experienced by a target might lead that person to become another perpetrator who bullies other colleagues who have less power than they do, thereby proliferating bullying in the organization.

Maarit Varitia, a workplace bullying researcher, found that 20% of interviewees who experienced workplace bullying attributed their being targeted to their being different from others.

The third relationship in the workplace is between employees and customers. Although less frequent, such cases play a significant role in the efficiency of the organization. Overly stressed or distressed employees may be less able to perform optimally and can impact the quality of service overall.

The fourth relationship in the workplace is between the organization or system and its employees. An article by Andreas Liefooghe (2012) notes that many employees describe their employer as a "bully".

These cases, the issue is not simply an organizational culture or environmental factors facilitating bullying, but bullying-like behaviour by an employer against an employee. Tremendous power imbalances between an organization and its employees enables the employer to "legitimately exercise" power (e.g., by monitoring and controlling employees) in a manner consistent with bullying.

Although the terminology of bullying traditionally implies an interpersonal relationship between the perpetrator and target, organizations' or other collectives' actions can constitute bullying both by definition and in their impacts on targets. However, while defining bullying as an interpersonal phenomenon is considered legitimate, classifying incidents of employer exploitation, retaliation, or other abuses of power against an employee as a form of bullying is often not taken as seriously.

== Organizational culture ==
Bullying is seen to be prevalent in organizations where employees and managers feel that they have the support, or at least the implicit blessing of senior managers to carry on their abusive and bullying behaviour. Vertical violence is a specific type of workplace violence based on the hierarchical or managerial structure present in many healthcare based establishments. This type of workplace violence, "is usually generated by a power imbalance, whether due to a real hierarchical structure or perceived by professionals. It generates feelings of humiliation, vulnerability, and helplessness in the victims, limiting their ability to develop competency and defend themselves" (Pérez-Fuentes et al. 2021, pg 2) Furthermore, new managers will quickly come to view this form of behaviour as acceptable and normal if they see others get away with it and are even rewarded for it.

When bullying happens at the highest levels, the effects may be far reaching. People may be bullied irrespective of their organizational status or rank, including senior managers, which indicates the possibility of a negative domino effect, where bullying may cascade downwards, as the targeted supervisors might offload their own aggression onto their subordinates. In such situations, a bullying scenario in the boardroom may actually threaten the productivity of the entire organisation.

=== Workplace bullying and occupational stress ===
The relationship between occupational stress and bullying was drawn in the matter of the UK Health and Safety Executive (HSE) issuing an Improvement Notice to the West Dorset General Hospital NHS Trust. This followed a complaint raised with the HSE by an employee who was off sick having suffered from bullying in the workplace. His managers had responded by telling him that in the event of his returning to work, it was unlikely that anything would be done about the bullying. The HSE found that the Trust did not have an occupational stress policy and directed them to create one in accordance with the soon-to-be-published HSE Management Standards. These are standards that managers should meet in their work if they are to ensure a safe workplace, as is required by the Health and Safety at Work etc. Act 1974 as was amended by the Management of Health and Safety at Work Regulations 1999 (SI 1999/3242), the latter directing that risks in the workplace must be identified, assessed and controlled. These risks include those hazards known to cause occupational stress. One of the six standards relates to managing relationships between employees, a matter in which the Trust had shown itself to be deficient.

=== UK Legal protection from workplace bullying ===
The six HSE Management Standards define a set of behaviours by managers that address the main reported causes of occupational stress. Managers that operate against the standards can readily be identified as workplace bullies i.e. have no regard for the demands, remove control whenever possible, let them struggle, allow bullying to run uncontrolled and never let them know what is going to happen next (mushroom management) i.e. 'show them who is in charge'. The standards define the main known causes of occupational stress, in accord with the DCS Model, but also provide a 'bullying checklist'.

==== The HSE Management Standards ====
- Demands – this includes issues such as workload, work patterns, and the work environment
- Control – how much say the person has in the way they do their work
- Support – this includes the encouragement, sponsorship, and resources provided by the organisation, line management, and colleagues
- Relationships – this includes promoting positive working to avoid conflict and dealing with unacceptable behaviour
- Role – whether people understand their role within the organisation and whether the organisation ensures that they do not have conflicting roles
- Change – how organisational change (large or small) is managed and communicated in the organisation

== Geographical culture ==
Research investigating the acceptability of bullying behaviour across different cultures (e.g. Power et al., 2013) clearly shows that culture affects the perception of acceptable behaviour. National background also influences the prevalence of workplace bullying (Harvey et al., 2009; Hoel et al., 1999; Lutgen-Sandvik et al., 2007).

Humane orientation is negatively associated with the acceptability of work-related bullying. Performance orientation is positively associated with the acceptance of bullying. Future orientation is negatively associated with the acceptability of bullying. A culture of femininity suggests that individuals who live and work in this kind of culture tend to value interpersonal relationships to a greater degree.

Three broad dimensions have been mentioned in relation to workplace bullying: power distance; masculinity versus femininity; and individualism versus collectivism (Lutgen-Sandvik et al., 2007).

In Confucian Asia, which has a higher performance orientation than Latin America and Sub-Saharan Africa, bullying may be seen as an acceptable price to pay for performance. The value Latin America holds for personal connections with employees and the higher humane orientation of Sub-Saharan Africa may help to explain their distaste for bullying. A culture of individualism in the US implies competition, which may increase the likelihood of workplace bullying situations.

== Culture of fear ==
Ashforth discussed potentially destructive sides of leadership and identified what he referred to as petty tyrants, i.e., leaders who exercise a tyrannical style of management, resulting in a climate of fear in the workplace. Partial or intermittent negative reinforcement can create an effective climate of fear and doubt. When employees get the sense that bullies "get away with it", a climate of fear may be the result. Several studies have confirmed a relationship between bullying, on the one hand, and an autocratic leadership and an authoritarian way of settling conflicts or dealing with disagreements, on the other. An authoritarian style of leadership may create a climate of fear, where there is little or no room for dialogue and where complaining may be considered futile. In professions where workplace bullying is common, and employees do not receive sufficient support from their coworkers or managers, it often generates feelings of resignation that lead them to believe that the abuse is a normal and inevitable part of the job. In a study of public-sector union members, approximately one in five workers reported having considered leaving the workplace as a result of witnessing bullying taking place. Rayner explained these figures by pointing to the presence of a climate of fear in which employees considered reporting to be unsafe, where bullies had "got away with it" previously despite management knowing of the presence of bullying.

== Kiss up kick down ==
The workplace bully may be respectful when talking to upper management but the opposite when it comes to their relationship with those whom they supervise: the "kiss up kick down" personality. Bullies tend to ingratiate themselves to their bosses while intimidating subordinates. They may be socially popular with others in management, including those who will determine their fate. Often, a workplace bully will have mastered kiss up kick down tactics that hide their abusive side from superiors who review their performance.

As a consequence of this kiss up kick down strategy:

- A bully's mistakes are always concealed or blamed on underlings or circumstances beyond their control
- A bully keeps the target under constant stress
- A bully's power base is fear, not respect
- A bully withholds information from subordinates and keeps the information flow top-down only
- A bully blames conflicts and problems on subordinate's lack of competence, poor attitude, or character flaws
- A bully creates an unnatural work environment where people constantly walk on eggshells and are compelled to behave in ways they normally would not

The flow of blame in an organization may be a primary indicator of that organization's robustness and integrity. Blame flowing downwards, from management to staff, or laterally between professionals or partner organizations, indicates organizational failure. In a blame culture, problem-solving is replaced by blame-avoidance. Confused roles and responsibilities also contribute to a blame culture. Blame culture reduces the capacity of an organization to take adequate measures to prevent minor problems from escalating into uncontrollable situations. Several issues identified in organizations with a blame culture contradicts high reliability organizations best practices. Blame culture is considered a serious issue in healthcare organizations by the World Health Organization, which recommends to promote a no-blame culture, or just culture, a means to increase patients safety.

== Fight or flight ==
The most typical reactions to workplace bullying are to do with the survival instinct – "fight or flight" – and these are probably a victim's healthier responses to bullying. Flight is often a response to bullying. It is very common, especially in organizations in which upper management cannot or will not deal with the bullying. In hard economic times, however, flight may not be an option, and fighting may be the only choice.

Fighting the bullying can require near heroic action, especially if the bullying targets just one or two individuals. It can also be a difficult challenge. There are some times when confrontation is called for. First, there is always a chance that the bully boss is under the impression that this is the way to get things done and does not recognize the havoc being wrought on subordinates.

== Typology of bullying behaviours ==
With some variations, the following typology of workplace bullying behaviours has been adopted by a number of academic researchers. The typology uses five different categories.

1. Threat to professional status – including belittling opinions, public professional humiliation, accusations regarding lack of effort, intimidating use of discipline or competence procedures.
2. Threat to personal standing – including undermining personal integrity, destructive innuendo and sarcasm, making inappropriate jokes about the target, persistent teasing, name calling, insults, intimidation.
3. Isolation – including preventing access to opportunities, physical or social isolation, withholding necessary information, keeping the target out of the loop, ignoring or excluding.
4. Overwork – including undue pressure, impossible deadlines, unnecessary disruptions.
5. Destabilisation – including failure to acknowledge good work, allocation of meaningless tasks, removal of responsibility, repeated reminders of blunders, setting target up to fail, shifting goal posts without telling the target.

== Tactics ==
Research by the Workplace Bullying Institute, suggests that the following are the 25 most common workplace bullying tactics:

1. Falsely accused someone of "errors" not actually made (71%).
2. Stared, glared, was nonverbally intimidating and was clearly showing hostility (68%).
3. Unjustly discounted the person's thoughts or feelings ("oh, that's silly") in meetings (64%).
4. Used the "silent treatment" to "ice out" and separate from others (64%).
5. Exhibited presumably uncontrollable mood swings in front of the group (61%).
6. Made-up rules on the fly that even they did not follow (61%).
7. Disregarded satisfactory or exemplary quality of completed work despite evidence (discrediting) (58%).
8. Harshly and constantly criticized, having a different standard for the target (57%).
9. Started, or failed to stop, destructive rumours or gossip about the person (56%).
10. Encouraged people to turn against the person being tormented (55%).
11. Singled out and isolated one person from other co-workers, either socially or physically (54%).
12. Publicly displayed gross, undignified, but not illegal, behaviour (53%).
13. Yelled, screamed, threw tantrums in front of others to humiliate a person (53%).
14. Stole credit for work done by others (plagiarism) (47%).
15. Abused the evaluation process by lying about the person's performance (46%).
16. Declared target "insubordinate" for failing to follow arbitrary commands (46%).
17. Used confidential information about a person to humiliate privately or publicly (45%).
18. Retaliated against the person after a complaint was filed (45%).
19. Made verbal put-downs/insults based on gender, race, accent, age or language, disability (44%).
20. Assigned undesirable work as punishment (44%).
21. Created unrealistic demands (workload, deadlines, duties) for person singled out (44%).
22. Launched a baseless campaign to oust the person; effort not stopped by the employer (43%).
23. Encouraged the person to quit or transfer rather than to face more mistreatment (43%).
24. Sabotaged the person's contribution to a team goal and reward (41%).
25. Ensured failure of person's project by not performing required tasks, such as sign-offs, taking calls, working with collaborators (40%)

== Abusive workplace behaviours ==
According to Bassman, common abusive workplace behaviours are:

1. Disrespecting and devaluing the individual, often through disrespectful and devaluing language or verbal abuse
2. Overwork and devaluation of personal life (particularly salaried workers who are not compensated)
3. Harassment through micromanagement of tasks and time
4. Over evaluation and manipulating information (for example concentration on negative characteristics and failures, setting up subordinate for failure).
5. Managing by threat and intimidation
6. Stealing credit and taking unfair advantage
7. Preventing access to opportunities
8. Downgrading an employee's capabilities to justify downsizing
9. Impulsive destructive behaviour

According to Hoel and Cooper, common abusive workplace behaviours are:

1. Ignoring opinions and views
2. Withholding information in order to affect the target's performance
3. Exposing the target to an unmanageable workload
4. Threatening employees' personal self esteem and work status.
5. Giving tasks with unreasonable or impossible targets or deadlines
6. Ordering the target to do work below competence
7. Ignoring or presenting hostility when the target approaches
8. Humiliation or ridicule in connection with work
9. Excessive monitoring of a target's work (see micromanagement)
10. Spreading gossip
11. Insulting or making offensive remarks about the target's person (i.e. habits and background), attitudes, or private life
12. Removing or replacing key areas of responsibility with more trivial or unpleasant tasks.

According to Faghihi, some abusive workplace behaviours include:

1. Excessive workload
2. Placement in an area where there is less experience or uncomfortable
3. Low salary
4. Working overtime without benefits
5. Poor work environment
6. Increase in stress in the workplace
7. Lack of facilities

Abusive cyberbullying in the workplace can have serious socioeconomic and psychological consequences on the victim. Workplace cyber-bullying can lead to sick leave due to depression which in turn can lead to loss of profits for the organisation.

== In specific professions ==
=== Academia ===
Several aspects of academia, such as the generally decentralized nature of academic institutions and the particular recruitment and career procedures, lend themselves to the practice of bullying and discourage its reporting and mitigation.

=== Blue-collar jobs ===
Bullying has been identified as prominent in blue collar jobs including on oil rigs, and in mechanical areas and machine shops, warehouses and factories. It is thought that intimidation and fear of retribution cause decreased incident reports, which, in the socioeconomic and cultural milieu of such industries, would likely lead to a vicious circle. This is often used in combination with manipulation and coercion of facts to gain favour among higher ranking administrators. For example, an investigation conducted following a hazing incident at Portland Bureau of Transportation within the city government of Portland, Oregon, found ritual hazing kept hidden for years under the guise of "no snitching", where whistleblowing was punished and loyalty was praised. Two-thirds of the interviewed employees in this investigation declared they deemed the best way they found to deal with the workplace's bad behaviours was "not to get involved", as they "feared retaliation if they did intervene or report the problems."

=== Information technology ===
A culture of bullying is common in information technology (IT), leading to high sickness rates, low morale, poor productivity and high staff turnover. Deadline-driven project work and stressed-out managers take their toll on IT workers.

=== Legal profession ===
Bullying in the legal profession is believed to be more common than in some other professions. It is believed that its adversarial, hierarchical tradition contributes towards this. Women, trainees and solicitors who have been qualified for five years or less are more impacted, as are ethnic minority lawyers and lesbian, gay and bisexual lawyers.

=== Medicine ===
Bullying in the medical profession is common, particularly of student or trainee doctors. In a study on the violence that occurs in healthcare, it was found that from 2002 to 2013 alone, the occurrence of abuse became four times as likely. It is thought that this is at least in part an outcome of conservative traditional hierarchical structures and teaching methods in the medical profession which may result in a bullying cycle.

=== Military ===
Bullying exists to varying degrees in the military of some countries, often involving various forms of hazing or abuse by higher members of the military hierarchy.

=== Nursing ===
Bullying has been identified as being particularly prevalent in the nursing profession although the reasons are not clear. It is thought that relational aggression (psychological aspects of bullying such as gossiping and intimidation) are relevant. Relational aggression has been studied amongst girls but not so much amongst adult women. A lot of bullying directed towards nurses is inflicted by patients, and nurses are at such higher risk because the most patient exposure out of any healthcare professional. Especially today with the shortage of nurses, nurses are seeing more patients for longer amounts of time which can lead to increased stress levels if they are a victim of bullying.

=== Teaching ===
School teachers are commonly the subject of bullying but they are also sometimes the originators of bullying within a school environment.

=== Volunteering ===
Bullying can be common in volunteering settings. For example, one study found bullying to be the most significant factor of complaints amongst volunteers. Volunteers often do not have access to protections available to paid employees, so while laws may indicate that bullying is a violation of rights, volunteers may have no means to address it.

== Forms ==
Tim Field suggested that workplace bullying takes these forms:

- Serial bullying – the source of all dysfunction can be traced to one individual, who picks on one employee after another and destroys them, then moves on. Probably the most common type of bullying.
- Secondary bullying – the pressure of having to deal with a serial bully causes the general behaviour to decline and sink to the lowest level.
- Pair bullying – this takes place with two people, one active and verbal, the other often watching and listening.
- Gang bullying or group bullying – is a serial bully with colleagues. Gangs can occur anywhere, but flourish in corporate bullying climates. It is often called mobbing and usually involves scapegoating and victimisation.
- Vicarious bullying – two parties are encouraged to fight. This is the typical "triangulation" where the aggression gets passed around.
- Regulation bullying – where a serial bully forces their target to comply with rules, regulations, procedures or laws regardless of their appropriateness, applicability or necessity.
- Residual bullying – after the serial bully has left or been fired, the behaviour continues. It can go on for years.
- Legal bullying – the bringing of a vexatious legal action to control and punish a person.
- Pressure bullying or unwitting bullying – having to work to unrealistic time scales or inadequate resources.
- Corporate bullying – where an employer abuses an employee with impunity, knowing the law is weak and the job market is soft.
- Organizational bullying – a combination of pressure bullying and corporate bullying. Occurs when an organization struggles to adapt to changing markets, reduced income, cuts in budgets, imposed expectations and other extreme pressures.
- Institutional bullying – entrenched and is accepted as part of the culture.
- Client bullying – an employee is bullied by those they serve, for instance subway attendants or public servants.
- Cyberbullying – the use of information and communication technologies to support deliberate, repeated, and hostile behaviour by an individual or group, that is intended to harm others.

Adult bullying can come in an assortment of forms. There are about five distinctive types of adult bullies. A narcissistic bully is described as a self-centred person whose egotism is frail and possesses the need to put others down. An impulsive bully is someone who acts on bullying based on stress or being upset at the moment. A physical bully uses physical injury and the threat of harm to abuse their victims, while a verbal bully uses demeaning language and cynicism to debase their victims. Lastly, a secondary adult bully is portrayed as a person that did not start the initial bullying but participates in afterwards to avoid being bullied themselves ("Adult Bullying").

== Emotional intelligence ==
Workplace bullying is reported to be far more prevalent than perhaps commonly thought. For some reason, workplace bullying seems to be particularly widespread in healthcare organizations; 80% of nurses report experiencing workplace bullying. Similar to the school environment for children, the work environment typically places groups of adult peers together in a shared space on a regular basis. In such a situation, social interactions and relationships are of great importance to the function of the organizational structure and in pursuing goals. The emotional consequences of bullying put an organization at risk of losing victimized employees. Bullying also contributes to a negative work environment, is not conducive to necessary cooperation and can lessen productivity at various levels.

Bullying in the workplace is associated with negative responses to stress. The ability to manage emotions, especially emotional stress, seems to be a consistently important factor in different types of bullying. The workplace in general can be a stressful environment, so a negative way of coping with stress or an inability to do so can be particularly damning. Workplace bullies may have high social intelligence and low emotional intelligence (EI). In this context, bullies tend to rank high on the social ladder and are adept at influencing others. The combination of high social intelligence and low empathy is conducive to manipulative behaviour, such that Hutchinson (2013) describes workplace bullying to be. In working groups where employees have low EI, workers can be persuaded to engage in unethical behaviour. With the bullies' persuasion, the work group is socialized in a way that rationalizes the behaviour, and makes the group tolerant or supportive of the bullying.

Hutchinson & Hurley (2013) make the case that EI and leadership skills are both necessary to bullying intervention in the workplace, and illustrates the relationship between EI, leadership and reductions in bullying. EI and ethical behaviour among other members of the work team have been shown to have a significant impact on ethical behaviour of nursing teams. Higher EI is linked to improvements in the work environment and is an important moderator between conflict and reactions to conflict in the workplace. The self-awareness and self-management dimensions of EI have both been illustrated to have strong positive correlations with effective leadership and the specific leadership ability to build healthy work environments and work culture.

== Related concepts ==
=== Abusive supervision ===
Abusive supervision overlaps with workplace bullying in the workplace context. Research suggests that 75% of workplace bullying incidents are perpetrated by hierarchically superior agents. Abusive supervision differs from related constructs such as supervisor bullying and undermining in that it does not describe the intentions or objectives of the supervisor.

=== Power and control ===
A power and control model has been developed for the workplace, divided into the following categories:

- overt actions
- covert actions
- emotional control
- isolation
- economic control
- tactics
- restrictions
- management privilege

=== Workplace mobbing ===
Workplace mobbing overlaps with workplace bullying. The concept originated from the study of animal behaviour. It concentrates on bullying by a group.

=== Workplace incivility ===
Workplace bullying overlaps to some degree with workplace incivility but tends to encompass more intense and typically repeated acts of disregard and rudeness. Negative spirals of increasing incivility between organizational members can result in bullying, but isolated acts of incivility are not conceptually bullying despite the apparent similarity in their form and content. In bullying, the intent of harm is less ambiguous, an unequal balance of power (both formal and informal) is more salient, and the target of bullying feels threatened, vulnerable and unable to defend themself against negative recurring actions.

=== Lateral/Vertical Violence ===
Terms often used within nursing and healthcare. Lateral violence (also known as horizontal violence) refers to bullying behaviours exhibited by colleagues. Vertical violence refers to bullying behaviours exhibited by supervisors to employees below them hierarchically. Despite the use of the term violence, these terms often do not encompass physically aggressive behaviours.

== Personality characteristics ==
=== Executives ===
In 2005, psychologists Belinda Board and Katarina Fritzon at the University of Surrey, UK, interviewed and gave personality tests to high-level British executives and compared their profiles with those of criminal psychiatric patients at Broadmoor Hospital in the UK. They found that three out of eleven personality disorders were actually more common in executives than in the disturbed criminals. They were:

- Histrionic personality disorder: including superficial charm, insincerity, egocentricity and manipulation
- Narcissistic personality disorder: including grandiosity, self-focused lack of empathy for others, exploitativeness and independence.
- Obsessive-compulsive personality disorder: including perfectionism, excessive devotion to work, rigidity, stubbornness and dictatorial tendencies.

They described these business people as successful psychopaths and the criminals as unsuccessful psychopaths.

According to leading leadership academic Manfred F.R. Kets de Vries, it seems almost inevitable these days that there will be some personality disorders in a senior management team.

Industrial/organizational psychology research has also examined the types of bullying that exist among business professionals and the prevalence of this form of bullying in the workplace as well as ways to measure bullying empirically.

=== Psychopathy ===
Bullying is used by corporate psychopaths as a tactic to humiliate subordinates. Bullying is also used as a tactic to scare, confuse and disorient those who may be a threat to the activities of the corporate psychopath Using meta data analysis on hundreds of UK research papers, Boddy concluded that 36% of bullying incidents were caused by the presence of corporate psychopaths. According to Boddy there are two types of bullying:

- Predatory bullying – the bully just enjoys bullying and tormenting vulnerable people for the sake of it.
- Instrumental bullying – the bullying is for a purpose, helping the bully achieve their goals.

A corporate psychopath uses instrumental bullying to further their goals of promotion and power as the result of causing confusion and divide and rule.

People with high scores on a psychopathy rating scale are more likely to engage in bullying, crime and drug use than other people. Hare and Babiak noted that about 29% of corporate psychopaths are also bullies. Other research has also shown that people with high scores on a psychopathy rating scale were more likely to engage in bullying, again indicating that psychopaths tend to be bullies in the workplace.

A workplace bully or abuser will often have issues with social functioning. These types of people often have psychopathic traits that are difficult to identify in the hiring and promotion process. These individuals often lack anger management skills and have a distorted sense of reality. Consequently, when confronted with the accusation of abuse, the abuser is not aware that any harm was done.

=== Narcissism ===
Narcissism, lack of self-regulation, lack of remorse and lack of conscience have been identified as traits displayed by bullies. These traits are shared with psychopaths, indicating that there is some theoretical cross-over between bullies and psychopaths. In 2007, researchers Catherine Mattice and Brian Spitzberg at San Diego State University, USA, found that narcissism revealed a positive relationship with bullying. Narcissists were found to prefer indirect bullying tactics (such as withholding information that affects others' performance, ignoring others, spreading gossip, constantly reminding others of mistakes, ordering others to do work below their competence level, and excessively monitoring others' work) rather than direct tactics (such as making threats, shouting, persistently criticizing, or making false allegations). The research also revealed that narcissists are highly motivated to bully, and that to some extent, they are left with feelings of satisfaction after a bullying incident occurs.

=== Machiavellianism ===
Research indicates that individuals scoring highly on Machiavellianism commonly engage in various forms of workplace misconduct, including withholding critical information from colleagues, strategically undermining others' reputations with management, failing to fulfill their professional responsibilities, and engaging in the dissemination of false information about their coworkers.

== Health effects ==
According to Gary and Ruth Namie, as well as Tracy, et al., workplace bullying can harm the health of the targets of bullying. Organizations are beginning to take note of workplace bullying because of the costs to the organization in terms of the health of their employees.

According to scholars at The Project for Wellness and Work-Life at Arizona State University, "workplace bullying is linked to a host of physical, psychological, organizational, and social costs." Stress is the most predominant health effect associated with bullying in the workplace. Research indicates that workplace stress has significant negative effects that are correlated to poor mental health and poor physical health, resulting in an increase in the use of "sick days" or time off from work.

The negative effects of bullying are so severe that posttraumatic stress disorder (PTSD) and even suicide are not uncommon. Tehrani found that 1 in 10 targets experience PTSD, and that 44% of her respondents experienced PTSD similar to that of battered women and victims of child abuse. Matthiesen and Einarsen found that up to 77% of targets experience PTSD.

In addition, co-workers who witness workplace bullying can also have negative effects, such as fear, stress, and emotional exhaustion. Those who witness repetitive workplace abuse often choose to leave the place of employment where the abuse took place. Workplace bullying can also hinder the organizational dynamics such as group cohesion, peer communication, and overall performance.

According to the 2012 survey conducted by Workplace Bullying Institute (516 respondents), Anticipation of next negative event is the most common psychological symptom of workplace bullying reported by 80%. Panic attacks afflict 52%. Half (49%) of targets reported being diagnosed with clinical depression. Sleep disruption, loss of concentration, mood swings, and pervasive sadness and insomnia were more common (ranging from 77% to 50%). Nearly three-quarters (71%) of targets sought treatment from a physician. Over half (63%) saw a mental health professional for their work-related symptoms. Respondents reported other symptoms that can be exacerbated by stress: migraine headaches (48%), irritable bowel disorder (37%), chronic fatigue syndrome (33%) and sexual dysfunction (27%).

=== Depression ===
Workplace depression can occur in many companies of various size and profession, and can have negative effects on positive profit growth. Stress factors that are unique to one's working environment, such as bullying from co-workers or superiors and poor social support for high pressure occupations, can build over time and create inefficient work behaviour in depressed individuals. In addition, inadequate or negative communication techniques can further drive an employee to become disconnected from the company's mission and goals. One way that companies can combat the destructive consequences associated with employee depression is to offer more support for counseling and consider bringing in experts to educate staff on the consequences of bullying. Ignoring the problem of depression and decreased workplace performance creates intergroup conflict and lasting feelings of disillusionment.

== Financial costs to employers ==
Several studies have attempted to quantify the cost of bullying to an organization.

- According to the National Institute for Occupational Safety and Health (NIOSH), mental illness among the workforce leads to a loss in employment amounting to $19 billion and a drop in productivity of $3 billion.
- In a report commissioned by the ILO, Hoel, Sparks, & Cooper did a comprehensive analysis of the costs involved in bullying. They estimated a cost 1.88 billion pounds plus the cost of lost productivity.
- Based on the replacement cost of those who leave as a result of being bullied or witnessing bullying, Rayner and Keashly (2004) estimated that for an organization of 1,000 people, the cost would be $1.2 million US. This estimate did not include the cost of litigation should victims bring suit against the organization.
- A recent Finnish study of more than 5,000 hospital staff found that those who had been bullied had 26% more certified sickness absence than those who were not bullied, when figures were adjusted for base-line measures one year prior to the survey (Kivimäki et al., 2000). According to the researchers these figures are probably an underestimation as many of the targets are likely to have been bullied already at the time the base-line measures were obtained.
- The city government of Portland, Oregon, was sued by a former employee for hazing abuse on the job. The victim sought damages of $250,000 and named the city, as well as the perpetrator Jerry Munson, a "lead worker" for the organization who was in a position of authority. The suit stated a supervisor was aware of the issue, but "failed to take any form of immediate appropriate and corrective action to stop it". After an investigation, the municipal government settled for US$80,000 after it believed that "there is risk the city may be found liable."

Researcher Tamara Parris discusses how employers need to be more attentive in managing various discordant behaviours such as bullying in the workplace, as they not only create a financial cost to the organization, but also erode the company's human resource assets. In an effort to bring about change in the workplace, Flynn discusses how employers need to not only support regulations set in place but also need to support their staff when such instances occur.

== By country ==
Workplace bullying is referred to as "power harassment" in Japan and "gapjil" in South Korea. Singapore: In an informal survey among 50 employees in Singapore, 82% said they had experienced toxicity from their direct superior or colleagues in their careers, with some 33.3% experiencing it on a daily basis. Some of the other reports was failing to agree with the boss was considered being a trouble maker, always having to give praise to the superior, the senior colleague has a tendency to shout at people. Many respondents reported that they had to quit because of the toxic environment. In other surveys, it is clear that the company is aware but does nothing. A Kantar survey in 2019 suggested that employees in Singapore were the most likely to be made to "feel uncomfortable" by their employers, compared with those in the other countries that the company polled.

In Poland, workplace bullying is a legal term (mobbing) defined in Article 94³ of the Labour Code; an amendment in force from 5 November 2026 removed the requirements of long duration, intent and damage to health and set minimum compensation at six times the statutory minimum wage.

== History ==
Research into workplace bullying stems from the initial Scandinavian investigations into school bullying in the late 1970s.

== See also ==
- Abuse – Improper usage or mistreatment
- Control freak – Colloquialism for a person obsessed with control
- Coworker backstabbing – Deliberate desire to cause harm to an organization or workplace
- Counterproductive workplace behaviour – Employee behavior that goes against the legitimate interests of an organization
- Cyber-aggression in the workplace – Type of aggression
- Employment discrimination – Form of discrimination
- Queen bee syndrome – Social phenomenon
- Sexual harassment – Unwanted sexual attention or advances
- Social undermining – Type of anti-social behavior
- Toxic leader – Leader who abuses the leader–follower relationship
- Toxic workplace – Informal term for a workplace marked by infighting and personal conflict
- Workplace aggression – Type of aggression
- Workplace harassment – Job related problems
- Workplace politics – Interpersonal interactions within the office
- Workplace revenge – Type of workplace bullying
