= Ethyl glucuronide =

Chemical compound

Pharmacokinetic data
- Elimination half-life: ~2–3 hours

Identifiers
- IUPAC name: (2S,3S,4S,5R)-6-Ethoxy-3,4,5-trihydroxyoxane-2-carboxylic acid
- CAS Number: 913255-98-8 1776950-35-6 (α) 17685-04-0 (β)
- PubChem CID: 152226
- ChemSpider: 134174
- UNII: CV2CWP5YT2
- CompTox Dashboard (EPA): DTXSID00904317

Chemical and physical data
- Formula: C_{8}H_{14}O_{7}
- Molar mass: 222.193 g·mol^{−1}
- 3D model (JSmol): Interactive image
- SMILES: CCOC1[C@@H]([C@H]([C@@H]([C@H](O1)C(=O)O)O)O)O
- InChI: InChI=1S/C8H14O7/c1-2-14-8-5(11)3(9)4(10)6(15-8)7(12)13/h3-6,8-11H,2H2,1H3,(H,12,13)/t3-,4-,5+,6-,8?/m0/s1; Key:IWJBVMJWSPZNJH-XWBUKDKVSA-N

Ethyl glucuronide (EtG) is a metabolite of ethanol which is formed in the body by glucuronidation following exposure to ethanol, usually from drinking alcoholic beverages. It is used as a biomarker to test for ethanol use and to monitor alcohol abstinence in situations where drinking is prohibited, such as by the military, in alcohol treatment programs, in professional monitoring programs (health professionals, attorneys, airline pilots in recovery from addictions), in schools, liver transplant clinics, or in recovering alcoholic patients. In addition to its use to monitor abstinence and detect drinking, EtG also has potential for monitoring the amount of alcohol use over time because it can be detected in hair and nails, though the effectiveness of this has not yet been proven.

A disadvantage of the test is that because EtG can be detected in samples at very low levels, it can also be positive after exposure to alcohol from non-beverage sources, or incidental exposure, which can lead to false positives. The sources of possible exposure in the environment are numerous and include alcohol in mouthwash, foods, over-the-counter medications, and even from inhalation of alcohol from topical use. It is impossible with this biomarker to distinguish small amounts of drinking from extraneous exposure to alcohol.

== Formation ==
In the human liver, glucuronosyltransferase enzymes UGT1A and UGT2B7 convert ethanol to its glucuronide by adding a sugar acid at the hydroxy group, with uridine diphosphate (UDP) as byproduct:

ethanol

+ UDP-glucuronate
UDP

Ethyl glucuronide

== Hair testing controversy ==
A growing number of articles are documenting the high sensitivity and specificity of hair (or nail) EtG for detection of heavy drinking.

EtG testing in hair specimens was previously attempted by laboratories in the United Kingdom, but has suffered from numerous lawsuits. Due to the concerns of legal risk, few laboratories offer this type of testing anymore, as it has been determined to be unreliable and unsupportable. The Society of Hair Testing (SOHT) also notes the limitations of EtG, stating that this form of testing can determine "chronic excessive alcohol consumption only. This consensus is not applicable for determination of abstinence from alcohol or moderate consumption of alcohol." SOHT also states, "It is not advisable to use the results of the hair testing for alcohol markers in isolation".

The U.S. Substance Abuse and Mental Health Services Administration has cautioned that the test is "scientifically unsupportable as the sole basis for legal or disciplinary action" because the highly sensitive tests "are not able to distinguish between alcohol absorbed into the body from exposure to many common commercial and household products containing alcohol and from the actual consumption of alcohol."
