= Drug testing welfare recipients =

Proposed policy for people receiving welfare

Some states in the United States of America have enacted or proposed legislation requiring drug testing of people applying for welfare. As of early 2017, 15 US states had passed legislation enabling drug testing of welfare applicants or recipients, primarily in relation to Temporary Assistance for Needy Families payments. Drug testing of welfare recipients has been proposed but not implemented in Canada, the UK, and Australia. In New Zealand, recipients of some payments may be required to take a drug test if this is a requirement of a potential employer or trainer.

== Arguments for ==
Proponents of such programs have supported them with a variety of goals in mind, including: getting help for drug users on welfare payments by referring those testing positive to treatment, avoiding "subsidizing drug habits" with public money, deterring drug use, reducing state welfare spending, and protecting children.

== Arguments against ==
Arguments against drug testing welfare recipients have claimed that they are unethical, politically motivated, or legally problematic; that they will cause harms; and that they are unlikely to be effectiveness and/or cost-effective. The American Civil Liberties Union has opposed welfare drug testing laws in Florida and expressed concern about the proposal gaining traction in other states.

Ethical/political/legal arguments:

- Eric Liu has criticized drug tests of welfare recipients, which are often promoted by Republican lawmakers, as hypocritical, as they promote government paternalism.
- Some suggest drug testing welfare recipients is linked to discrimination against welfare recipients or to racism.
- Public policy professor Harold Pollack wrote that "Other physical and mental health problems are far more prevalent. Yet these less-moralized concerns receive much less attention from legislators or the general public."
- The ethical acceptability of drug testing welfare recipients has been questioned on the bases that it does not meet ethical standards of necessity, proportionality, and a reasonable chance of success; and that they violate privacy and can strengthen inequalities.
- Almost all scholarly articles on the subject of suspicionless drug testing of welfare recipients have concluded that this testing violates the Fourth Amendment to the United States Constitution. For this reason many programs now involve initial screening with a psychological assessment tool, with those considered likely to have a drug problem then referred for testing.

Potential harm:

- Executives of the non-profit group CLASP have stated that the laws will have a chilling effect on the willingness of existing welfare recipients to admit themselves to drug treatment.

Effectiveness/cost-effectiveness

- Some critics argue the programs are unlikely to meet their aims and that some of the aims are in conflict with each other in practice.
- Opponents have criticized these laws for costing more money than they save. The cost per positive test varies because of differences in state programs, but a review of 14 programs in 2016 reported costs per positive test result of between $200 (Tennessee) and $7,006 (Missouri).

== Laws by state ==
=== Arizona ===
In 2009, Arizona enacted a drug-testing law for welfare applicants that have a felony drug conviction.

=== Florida ===
In December 2013, federal judge Mary Stenson Scriven struck down a Florida law, passed in May 2011, that required welfare recipients to be drug tested before they could receive benefits. Rick Scott, the governor of Florida, had endorsed the legislation, and said he intended to appeal Scriven's decision to the U.S. Court of Appeals.

=== Georgia ===
In April 2014, Georgia governor Nathan Deal signed a bill requiring drug testing for welfare applicants "if authorities have a 'reasonable suspicion' of drug use."

=== Michigan ===
In 1999 a pilot program of drug testing welfare recipients was introduced, but terminated after a legal challenge that it violated the Fourth Amendment. In December 2014, Rick Snyder, the governor of Michigan, signed a bill beginning a pilot program whereby welfare recipients in three Michigan counties will be drug tested if they are suspected of having used drugs.

=== Utah ===
From August 2012 to July 2013, Utah spent over $30,000 on drug testing welfare applicants. State Representative Brad Wilson claimed in September 2013 that the program had saved more than $350,000 based on a drop of 247 applicants for TANF after the drug testing was instituted.

=== Wisconsin ===
Scott Walker, the former governor of Wisconsin, has previously endorsed drug testing for welfare recipients.

== Positive drug test result rates ==
In a pilot drug testing program in Florida in 1999-2000, 5.1% returned a positive urinalysis. A 2015 study by ThinkProgress found that out of seven states reporting data on welfare drug testing, only one had a usage rate above 1%. Analysis of data on US state programs provided by CLASP shows that of the total population screened in 9 states, 0.19% returned positive tests, or 0.57% if refused tests (where reported) are treated as positives (see data in appendix D).
