= Tony Buon =

British psychologist

Tony Buon (born December 1960), is a British workplace psychologist, speaker, mediator and author. He is the Managing Partner of Buon Consultancy based in Edinburgh, Scotland

Buon has been a lecturer at Robert Gordon University in Aberdeen Scotland, a Senior lecturer at Macquarie University Australia and at the University of Western Sydney, Australia and a visiting professor at a number of international universities including Harvard (USA), Shanghai Normal University (PRC) and Trinity College Dublin. His areas of expertise include: Workplace psychology; learning & development, alcohol & other drugs in the workplace; employee assistance programs; workplace mediation; cultural communication, EAPs, recruitment and credentialism

== Education ==
Tony Buon holds diplomas in Mediation, Conflict Resolution, Counseling and Teaching. He has also been awarded degrees in Psychology and Behavioural Sciences and he holds Post-Graduate Qualifications in Education and Organisational Psychology. His post-graduate research was into recruitment and credentialism was conducted at Macquarie University in Australia.

== Work ==
Buon has taught leadership, psychology and human resources management up to Master's Level in universities in Australia and the UK and has also taught an accredited MBA programme. Today he provides consultancy and training services on learning and development, HRM, workplace mediation and other people issues. Tony Buon has worked in a number of countries including the UK, Ireland, Australia, China, Malaysia, USA, Finland, Greece, GCC, Nigeria, France and Italy.

Born in Scotland, Tony spent many years in Australia where he owned and ran a large workplace psychological services consultancy. He also opened the first private psychological services in the People's Republic of China. In 2008 he ran training programmes in China for Psychologists providing trauma counselling to the survivors of the Wenchuan earthquake.

== Books ==
Buon has written a number of books and book chapters on subjects related to psychology, communication, coaching and counseling. His best selling book was "The Leadership Coach" part of the well known "Teach Yourself" series and published by Hodder & Stoughton. His book "Communication Genius: 40 Insights From the Science of Communicating" was published by John Murray John Murray (publishing house) in 2015 in the UK and in 2016 in the USA

== Media appearances ==
Buon has been featured in Rolling Stone magazine and The Reader's Digest. He has appeared on CNN, BBC, Trans-World Sport and many international television and radio stations discussing people problems, and workplace psychology.

== Film production ==
Buon has produced a number of specialist training and educational films, including the Human Rights Australia Award nominated film In Too Deep.

== Selected bibliography ==
- Buon, T (2015) Communication Genius: 40 Insights from the Science of Communicating. Hodder & Stoughton General Division ISBN 9781473605404
- Buon, T & Kinder, A (2015) The Role of Coaching in Supporting Organisations to Address mental Health Issues. Ch.9. in Coaching in Times of Crisis and Transformation: How to Help Individuals and Organizations Flourish. Liz Hall (Ed). Kogan Page
- Buon, T (2014) The Leadership Coach. Hodder & Stoughton: London ISBN 1473601142
- Buon, T (2012) Counselling & Psychology in China. Counselling at Work. Autumn.
- Zhu, X, Wang, Z, and Buon, T (2012). Trauma Counseling and Psychological Support in the People's Republic of China (PRC). in International Handbook of Workplace Trauma Support, 1st Edition. Edited by R. Hughes, C. Cooper, and A. Kinder. John Wiley: UK ISBN 978-0-470-97413-1
- Buon, T & Taylor, J (2008) A Review of the EAP Market in the United Kingdom and Europe. Journal of Workplace Behavioral Health, Vol. 23(4) 425-443
- Buon, T (2008) Perspectives on Managing Workplace Conflict. In Employee Well-being Support: A Workplace Resource (2008) Kinder, A, Hughes, R & Cooper Cary (Eds), John Wiley & Sons, Ltd Publisher ISBN 978-0-470-05900-5
- Buon T & Buon, C (2007) The Bully Within. Counselling at Work. Summer.
- Buon, T (2005). The Management of Workplace Bullying. PKU Business Review, 5, 74–79, Peking University (PRC) (Published in Chinese).
- Buon, T (2005). Employee Counselling and Performance Management, Counselling at Work. Summer, 18–19.
- Buon, T (2004). Future of workplace counselling. Counselling at Work. ACW. Summer
- Buon, T (2003). Not another Syndicate Group! Development and Learning in Organizations: An International Journal. 18, 1, 15–17.
- Buon, Y. and Compton, B. 1994. The Development of Alcohol and Other Drug Programs in the Workplace. In Stone, R. J. (Ed.). Readings in Human Resource Management (Volume 2): 240–252. Brisbane: John Wiley Ltd. ISBN 0471335487
- Buon, T (1994). The Recruitment of Training Professionals. Training & Development in Australia, 21, 17–22.
- Buon, T & Compton, B (1989). Who's on the qualifications merry-go-round? ISBN 1863410104
- Buon, T. (1984). The Newtown Project - A Programme Intended to Reduce Juvenile Shop Stealing Behaviour. Proceedings of the Institute of Criminology, 57, 84–87.
