= Life writing =

Recording of memories and experiences

Life writing is an expansive genre that primarily deals with the purposeful recording of personal memories, experiences, opinions, and emotions for different ends. While what actually constitutes life writing has been up for debate throughout history, it has often been defined through the lens of the history of the autobiography genre as well as the concept of the self as it arises in writing. Framed by these two concepts, life writing as a genre has emerged to include many other subgenres including, but not limited to, the biography, memoir, diary, letter, testimony, and personal essay.

David McCooey highlights the interplay between literary and empirical writing. McCooey emphasizes the distinction between narrative as a literary tool and narrative as a lived experience. By viewing life writing as a practice rather than a discipline, McCooey points out its perpetual preoccupations with several boundaries. These boundaries include the division between the self and others, the limits of remembering and forgetting, etc.

Life writing has functioned as a generic outlet for individuals to assess their personal diverse needs throughout history. In addition, David McCooey argues that the genre of life writing shares a similar quality to history, as both engage in an ongoing discussion that fosters an understanding of their overall significance within the broader scope of literary expression. It has served as a mode for the exploration of identity through critical self-reflection, allowing an individual to consider the internal, external, and temporal forces shaping their complex social identity. Likewise, the supergenre of life writing has permitted an individual to personally decide how they want to present themselves, whether that be to others within their social groups or simply to themselves as a way of imagining their ideal selves. Often accompanying the opportunity presented by life writing to fabricate a different self is the concept of resisting socio-cultural expectations, as the self that is fashioned may rebel against or reinforce societal norms that would otherwise be difficult to do in one's actual lived experience.

Life writing has further persisted in its use as an emotional space for negotiations of various feelings, inner desires, aspirations, and secrets. Individual pieces of life writing have attested to this flexibility and exploration possible within the genre, and such a flexibility has given life writing the role of preserving memory as well; these memories have ranged from keeping family traditions to recollecting one's past experiences as a way to diminish the potential onset or effects of dementia.

Life writing has been associated with bettering an individual's psychological and cognitive welfare significantly. For example, it has served to offer increased insight into an individual's difficult experiences, provide healthy coping management techniques, enable self-empathy with one's past self for consequential improvement of the present and future self, and propel discovery of one's life purpose since it has been altered within the confines of time. In the article called "The Limits of Life Writing," McCooey notes the extensive prevalence of life writing in contemporary society while highlighting the emergence of social media platforms, mobile networks, and electronic devices that have amplified the multi-platform nature of life writing. This broad examination shows how life writing and the real life autobiographies and biographies they are based on are connected in many ways. The area of life writing has gone through a lot of changes, such as focusing on ethics, taking a post-human point of view, and looking at emotions. As a result, these transformations did not occur in isolation but rather in continual conversation with other discourses, particularly in the legal and medical fields.These changes in life writing have gone beyond the usual limits of literary analysis, going into a rich study of the complicated limits that make this form what it is.

== Definition ==
Life writing is a broad generic category encompassing a myriad of diverse literary subgenres related to autobiographical storytelling. The qualities a piece of writing must possess in order to be classified under the umbrella term of "life writing" has been up for debate, as what constitutes life writing has been continually altered and redefined throughout history. Approaches to defining life writing have ranged from establishing loose criteria for its generic language and style – its form – to evaluating its content, topic, and context – its substance.

Despite the sizeable ambiguity revolving around the term, scholars have expressed a sustained general consensus about what life writing entails. Life writing has been determined to be generally nonfictive as well as closely associated with two themes: the genre of the autobiography as well as the relation of writing to the self. The autobiography has been perceived as the precursor to life writing, setting the foundation down for the first-person prose narrative inherently characteristic of the pieces falling within the genre. The terms "life writing" and "autobiography" are used interchangeably in many studies of life writing, despite the fact that other scholars champion slight differences existing between the two that have emerged to be more distinguishable with time. The level of connection existing between life writing and autobiography has been negotiated as well as contested. After all, when writing embraces an autobiographical essence, it emerges from the notion of our existence, grounding itself in the present moment. This sense of one's experiences in the present moment conveys a quality to life itself, enabling its usefulness regardless of surreal and imaginative fiction.

Scholars who view the autobiography to be intimately connected to life writing have conveyed its respective influence on the comprehensive genre. The framework of the autobiography in itself has put forth many of the pieces that have been chosen for critical reflection and study in life writing. Some of those include the memoir, diary, personal journal, annotated almanac, prose narrative, testimony, and poem. The social contexts in which the autobiography has occurred has enhanced the vastness of life writing as a genre; it has touched particularly upon the political, religious, psychological, and feminist spheres. While the autobiography is substantially recognized and discussed within the study of life writing, genres that have been less acknowledged but still considered to be emblematic of life writing have also been identified. Such genres include letters, travel-inspired writing, historical records, and that of the biography.

Coupled with the autobiographical tendency apparent within life writing, life writing involves discerning one or more dimensions of the self. Individuals taking on the endeavor of life writing are at liberty to utilize the generic outlet for personal expression or examination of themselves. In both respects, the self becomes a governing force within life writing, as individuals deliberately engage in the exploration of their emotions, thoughts, intersectional identities, social roles, relationships, temporal position, and their place within their socio-cultural context.

== Historical uses ==
=== Identity and self-reflection ===
Amassing popularity in the early modern period, life writing has been utilized by individuals as a method of exploring the complex dimensions of their identity. In the act of life writing, individuals are encouraged to comprehend what specific facet of their identity most prominently shapes the whole of it, whether that be one affiliated with the romantic, spiritual, racial, gendered, socio-economic, or familial. Because life writing prompts an individual to evaluate themselves personally, it concurrently motivates them to understand themselves not only as isolated and solitary beings but also as a product of numerous external influences pertaining to society and culture. In this manner, life writing is regarded as an outlet for "self-collection," wherein an individual gathers information gradually about themselves by the two-fold means of internal introspection as well as contemplation of outward forces. Life writing consequently bridges the public and the private, creating a union of contexts that ultimately manifests itself within the writing of an individual. Life writing for the aim of further discovering an individual's identity becomes a meaning-making activity, one that entails making sense of the world and the experiences they endure within it.

=== Presentation of the self and form of resistance ===
Individuals have employed life writing to fabricate a certain image of themselves in order to control how they appeal to others as well as to themselves. Through the subjectivity of life writing, individuals are imbued with the option to represent who they are by either attempting to objectively recount their experiences or by crafting a version of themselves they ideally imagine to be through purposeful or subconscious deliberation. This use of life writing has been historically represented in relation to gender, as cultural assumptions ingrained within the fabric of society have often hindered individuals from deviating from their assigned social roles and achieving their ideal selves. Commencing in first half of the 16th century, women utilized diaries, a genre of life writing, to craft their own personas. For example, Anne Askew through her autobiography The Examinations of Anne Askew attempted to convince herself of her religious nature and her involvement within her church. Katherine Austen in the 17th century portrayed herself as a widowed evangelist. Likewise, Anne Clifford in her personal diary depicted herself predominantly as a woman in possession of property rather than through the traditional social role of an "obedient wife." In order to stray away from societal expectations, Dionys Fitzherbert in her autobiographical writings in the 17th century refuses to acknowledge her own mental illness, denying its existence in order lessen the strength of the cultural association between femininity and hysteria. Through this personal control of narrative, life writing allows individuals to exercise their sense of authority in deciding what to reveal about themselves.

In addition to women, men have also found refuge in the genres of life writing, particularly through that of the journal. In such autobiographical pieces, men fashioned themselves in alignment with cultural assumptions. Simon Forman and Thomas Whythorne within their autobiographies play into the traditional notions of masculine traits—power and strength—within their portrayal of themselves as being objects of pursuit by the opposite sex. In her article called "Reading Silence in the Long Nineteenth-Century Women's Life Writing Archive", Alexis Wolf explores the women's life writing archive of the nineteenth century as a concept and physical space. Through analyzing various sources, including unconventional ones, Wolf emphasizes the need for researchers to carefully select materials and interpret them critically. The author advocates for expanding the conventional boundaries of an archive to better engage with the surviving remnants of women's life writing from this significant historical era. Moreover, Lois Burke wrote an article titled "A Present for My Daughter': Gender and Posterity in Victorian Intergenerational Life Writing", which delves into insights into gender dynamics and concerns surrounding future generations in Victorian intergenerational life writing. Through her analysis, Burke uncovers the profound impact that societal and cultural norms had on women's life narratives during the Victorian era. These narratives, in turn, emerged as powerful agents, challenging traditional gender roles and defying societal expectations.

Life writing, through the presentation of the self, has simultaneously served as a private form of resistance for individuals. Individuals writing pieces that exemplify life writing experiment with the subversion of socio-cultural norms, stereotypes, and overgeneralizations. They challenge how others perceive themselves, consequently enabling them to acquire an individual autonomy through their writing and thus personal fulfillment and satisfaction. In the article called "Archival and Affective Displacements: The Ethics of Self-reflexivity, Shame, and Sacrifice in J.M. Coetzee's Life-Writing," Marc Farrant delves into the realm of J.M. Coetzee's life-writing, specifically examining the ethical dimensions that exist within this genre. It encourages authors to critically analyze their own experiences, urging them to reflect on the implications of their work. The study places significance on Coetzee's life writing and its impact on the broader field of literature, highlighting both the challenges and opportunities it presents for ethical self-reflection and literary engagement. Moreover, the article delves into the concept of archival displacement, where authors interact with personal archives, exploring the profound emotional impact on both writer and reader. It examines how this compliance reasoning, tied to self-awareness and the imperfect nature of existence, is intertwined with secular confession and language while exploring how humiliation motivates authors to shape their narratives.

==== Emotional space ====
Life writing has been used as a generic outlet for individuals to explore and evaluate their emotions. In narrating one's life, an individual is placed in a position to purposefully choose certain words to describe how they are feeling, which has been demonstrated to provide increased self-clarity. Life writing in this manner assists in formally recognizing that an event has happened. For example, in being able to articulate the passing of her child through life writing, a mother was able to identify as well as use her writing as a resource to cope with her grief. Life writing, too, has been claimed to assist individuals banished from certain social communities to register and manage the circumstances of their exiles. While life writing allowed individuals to accept the occurrence of a situation, it also functioned as a place to investigate primitive desires and voice secret aspirations. In the 17th century, Thomas Whythone and Anne Clifford within their autobiographical writings navigated sexual tensions and the power dynamics existing between those engaging in the intimate act. Furthermore, individuals use forms of life writing such as the diary to convey personal opinions on political topics pertaining to their temporal period. Life writing in this way enables individuals to place history within their own perspective.

=== Memory ===
When information is recorded as a form of life writing, it takes up the quality of permanence embedded within it. Life writing enables an individual to retain otherwise fleeting emotions and feelings as well as history about one's personal growth and family environment. As a reference for stimulating recollection of the past, life writing preserves traditions, events, and experiences so that they may transcend the confines of time. Because it keeps the past animate within the present, life writing permits an individual to adopt an outsider's perspective on their past experiences; they are given the ability to examine the life choices they made as well as their upbringing and relationships more critically in order to increase their understanding of themselves. Recording one's experiences through life writing also enables intellectual activity and cognitive stimulation, resulting in the effect of strengthening memory and subsequently lowering the individual risk of dementia and Alzheimers. In the permanence of information within life writing, individuals suffering from loss of memory can recall their experiences in their authentic initial forms. Paul John Eakin's book entitled Writing Life Writing: Narrative, History, Autobiography provides a comprehensive overview of life writing in capturing personal experiences and shaping collective understanding. Eakin highlights the intersection between life writing and other academic disciplines, such as history and sociology, and explores the profound impact of the internet and social media on our perception of selfhood and identity, drawing on the perspectives of his friend Philippe Lejeune, who suggested that computer-age devices have significantly transformed the nature of life writing.

== Benefits ==
=== Psychological and cognitive welfare ===
Studies of life writing have affirmed its psychological and cognitive benefits. Life writing can facilitate a fluid expression of feeling, a shift in personal thinking, and the development of self-control and confidence, especially within individuals possessive of low self-esteem. Expressive writing as a relative mode of life writing has been a technique involved in fostering an individual's psychological and cognitive well-being. It is a technique wherein one can write freely concerning their emotions about a personal difficult experience without worrying about linguistic and structural constraints. Such difficult experiences that may be reflected upon in this type of writing include physical and health issues, witnessing environmental catastrophes, and first-hand interactions with violence. In a study conducted by Charles Matthew Stapleton and his colleagues, they find that individuals who use writing to cope obtain a strength of mind that prevents self-criticism and doubt from holding dominion. As a result of writing about a difficult experience, these individuals exhibited a decrease in distress, a healthy management of stress and anxiety, the increased acquisition of a positive mood, and became less cognitively avoidant of acknowledging the particular event. Because they are able to organize and interpret the difficult experience they encountered on their own terms through their writing, the subjects within the study were able to integrate the experiences into their repertoire of identity, amassing the courage to face it head-on.

Autobiographical writing enables personal issues to be dealt with intentionally and practically. As individuals involve themselves with their own life writing, they reduce the mental and associated physical burden of having to suppress secrets or negative events by transferring the emotional weight and cognitive load onto paper. Within the aforementioned study by Stapleton, individuals reported increased gratitude and relief in releasing pent-up contemplations through personal autobiographical narration.

=== Reconciliation of the selves ===
Life writing has been employed by individuals to reexamine, redefine, rearrange, and retell their life stories. Yue Gu has championed that life writing is a conversation occurring between the two different selves of an individual. Self 1 is the foundational self, the one that actually endured the experience in the past, whereas Self 2 is the self in the present, writing the autobiographical narrative and looking back at the past. Because Self 2 is situated in the present, the individual takes on the position of a counselor and guide to their self in the past. The individual in this sense is able to break through previously maintained assumptions through empathizing, validating, and forgiving the self within their past. Life writing in this way allows for the merging of the two selves, a self-unity that permits one to view time collectively, with a new outlook and sense of meaning. The individual becomes in sync with their authentic selves, allowing them to heal from within. For example, Suzette A. Hencke, in her study of women's life writing, showed that life writing offered women writers the opportunity to put narrator and participant in conversation with one another in order to re-integrate parts of the self that were fragmented by trauma. In such a case, life writing allowed individuals to assume both the role of the "client" and "therapist" in themselves. Life writing has not only occurred in solitude but also has been opened for collaboration as well. Professionals within the realm of medicine, therapy, and education utilize life writing as a technique for individuals to better understand their motives for acting, thinking, and feeling. These professionals serve almost as "writing coaches," offering feedback and guidance for individuals as they come to revelatory conclusions from authoring their own life stories.

Life writing has also been determined to help an individual better understand the purpose they have in the world. In 1975, psychologist Ira Progoff identified the positive psychological benefits that journal writing, or autobiographical writing, could have on one's self-concept. The findings of Progoff's research demonstrated that an intensive journal method could "draw each person's life towards wholeness at its own tempo." Life writing in systematic sections mediates between past and present and creates a continuity of the self that can further be improved.

== Limitations ==
=== Power imbalances and ownership ===
In life writing, particularly in biographies and memoirs, the possible power imbalance between a writer and a subject as well as clashes over ownership may act as limiting factors to the benefits of the genre. One power imbalance scenario is when the writer "outranks" the subject in terms of race, class, gender, literacy, or another difference which imposes a hierarchy. In this case, the writer's voice may dominate the subject's voice, especially if they are one of "those who do not write". Another power imbalance scenario happens when the subject outranks the writer in terms of wealth, status, or clout, a situation which favors the subject. This may lead to a situation in which the writer struggles to stay true to historical facts while also having the obligation to portray the subject's possibly inaccurate memories.

The issue of ownership may arise when the writer and subject clash over their differences, such as in the court case of subject Fay Vincent, former commissioner of baseball, and writer David A. Kaplan. In 1994, Vincent withdrew his consent to publish his memoir "Baseball Breaks Your Heart" which was written in collaboration with Kaplan. Vincent was hesitant to publish the memoir as he was concerned about reviving past controversies. Kaplan argued that he had a right to publish the memoir as its co-author and joint copyright owner and that by not allowing the memoir to be published, Vincent was depriving him of the "fruits of his labor". Vincent ultimately won the court case, but the situation brought forth the question of "whose life really is it?".

In the article "Relational Ethics in Writing a Women’s Life" by Betty Franklin and Lucy Townsend, they discuss the risks of the traditional process of writing one's life in which the writer assumes a superior "all-knowing" position which is neutral, and therefore is able to interpret the subject's experiences accurately, though that is not always the case. This creates an unbalanced relationship between the writer and the subject.

=== Portrayal of a subject or writer ===
Critiques of the life writing genre point out the detached and objective voice of the writer as it erases their personal creativity, unique background and colors from their own research and work. Erasing the writer from the final product, erases the writer's personal choices and perspective which they used to write about the subject's life.

In translating a real life into a text, the depth of the subject's reality may be distorted. For example, Sienkiewicz-Mercer's memoir I Raise My Eyes to Say Yes was written by Steven B. Kaplan on behalf of Ruth Sienkiewicz, but there may have been distortions to her story caused by her disability and by her communication using a word board. The difference in their voices may have accidentally masked the true reality of Sienkiewicz-Mercer's disability, the very factor which defined most of her life.

=== Psychological and physical distress ===
Authors may experience psychological and physical effects when writing about their personal trauma. The risk of writing about personal trauma can be divided into two types, the first being the production of a life writing piece which involves an emotional and physical toll on the author as they relive their hardest moments. The second type is the reception which comes after the author has published their work. Writing a life story can cause a relinquishment of agency as the author no longer has control and their work is up to the interpretations of the public. The process of writing, editing, and polishing a traumatic life writing piece can put pressure on a writer and may pose the risk of re-traumatization.

== Academic study ==
There are now Centres for Life Writing Research at the University of Oxford, King's College London, and the University of Sussex.

The Centres are multi-disciplinary, with contributors from history, sociology, anthropology, philosophy, cultural studies and psychology as well as English language and literature and aim to produce academic publications in the field of life writing as well as contributing through other mediums, such as television, radio and the internet.

The University of Sussex Library is also home to the Mass-Observation Archive, a large collection of material from everyday life, personally kept routines and diaries that were collated between 1937 and the early 1950s. More recently Mass-Observation Archive has been collecting new material since the early 1980s, in order to generate a comparable record of everyday life from a personal perspective. The archive is considered of great social and cultural importance as well as supplying previously unheard accounts and stories of routine wartime and contemporary Britain.

The International Auto/Biography Association holds a biannual conference which brings together some of the leading scholars in the field.

== Examples ==
Life writing has been evident for nearly 2,000 years. St Augustine's autobiographical work being one example from the late 4th century AD.

Margery Kempe, an early 15th-century English woman, is believed to have written the first autobiography in the English language, though it was a production that depended upon the help of scribes. This text provides what could be the best insight into a female, middle class experience in the Middle Ages.

Other well-known examples include Mein Kampf by Adolf Hitler and Long Walk to Freedom by Nelson Mandela.

The continued popularity of the biographic form can be seen with the recent publication of the Oxford Dictionary of National Biography, an updated version of a 19th-century publication, containing 50,113 biographic articles about 54,922 people who have significantly affected and shaped Britain.

== See also ==
- Narrative identity
- Carl Leggo
