= Kevin Masters (psychologist) =

American psychologist

Kevin S. Masters
- Born: 1958 (age 67–68)
- Education: Brigham Young University (PhD)
- Scientific career
- Fields: Psychology, Behavioral medicine
- Workplaces: University of Colorado Denver
- Website: Faculty page

Kevin S. Masters (born 1958) is a Professor of Psychology at the University of Colorado Denver. Since 2009, he has been editor-in-chief of the Journal of Behavioral Medicine, where he was earlier an associate editor (2005–2009). He has also served as associate editor at Annals of Behavioral Medicine (2009–2011). and is currently the Editor-in-Chief of Annals of Behavioral Medicine.

Masters has published numerous articles on the health effects and correlates of religion and spirituality.

== Biography ==
Masters was born in 1958. He obtained his baccalaureate degree in psychology in 1980 from Cedarville College, (BA, 1980), later obtaining graduate degrees in clinical psychology from the University of Dayton, (MA, 1982) and Brigham Young University (PhD, 1989). His doctoral thesis focused on why people run the marathon.

== Publications (selected) ==
Spirituality, religion, and health:

- Masters, Kevin S.; Spielmans, Glen I. (May 2007). "Prayer and Health: Review, Meta-Analysis, and Research Agenda". Journal of Behavioral Medicine. 30 (4): 329–338. doi:10.1007/s10865-007-9106-7. PMID 17487575. S2CID 3621477.
- Steffen, Patrick R.; Masters, Kevin S. (2005). "Does compassion mediate the intrinsic religion-health relationship?". Annals of Behavioral Medicine. 30 (3): 217–224. doi:10.1207/s15324796abm3003_6. PMID 16336073.
- Kapuscinski, Afton N.; Masters, Kevin S. (2010). "The current status of measures of spirituality: A critical review of scale development". Psychology of Religion and Spirituality. 2 (4): 191–205. doi:10.1037/a0020498.
- Masters, Kevin S.; Carey, Kate B.; Maisto, Stephen A.; Caldwell, Paul E.; Wolfe, Thomas V.; Hackney, Harold L.; France, Christopher R.; Himawan, Lina (March 2009). "Psychometric Examination of the Brief Multidimensional Measure of Religiousness/Spirituality Among College Students". International Journal for the Psychology of Religion. 19 (2): 106–120. doi:10.1080/10508610802711194. S2CID 143818118.

Other:

- Masters, Kevin S.; Ogles, Benjamin M. (September 1998). "Associative and dissociative cognitive strategies in exercise and running: 20 years later, what do we know?". The Sport Psychologist. 12 (3): 253–270. doi:10.1123/tsp.12.3.253. ISSN 0888-4781.
