= Journal therapy =

Types of therapy where the patient records thoughts and memories in writing

Journal therapy is a writing therapy focusing on the writer's internal experiences, thoughts and feelings. This kind of therapy uses reflective writing enabling the writer to gain mental and emotional clarity, validate experiences and come to a deeper understanding of themself. Journal therapy can also be used to express difficult material or access previously inaccessible materials.

Like other forms of therapy, journal therapy can be used to heal a writer's emotional or physical problems or work through a trauma, such as an illness, addiction, or relationship problems, among others. Journal therapy can supplement an on-going therapy, or can take place in group therapy or self-directed therapy.

== Brief history ==
Ira Progoff created the intensive journal writing program in 1966 in New York. The intensive journal method is a structured way of writing about nature that allows the writer to achieve spiritual and personal growth. This method consists of a three-ring, loose-leaf binder with four color-coded sections: lifetime dimension, dialogue dimension, depth dimension and meaning dimension. These sections are divided into several subsections. Some of these subsections include topics like career, dreams, body and health, interests, events and meaning in life. Progoff created the intensive journal so that working in one part of the journal would in turn stimulate one to work on another part of the journal, leading to different viewpoints, awareness and connections between subjects. The intensive journal method began with recording the session in a daily log.

The field of journal therapy reached a wider audience in the 1970s with the publication of three books, namely, Progoff's At a Journal Workshop (1978), Christina Baldwin's One to One: Self-Understanding Through Journal Writing (1977) and Tristine Rainer's The New Diary (1978).

In 1985, psychotherapist and journal therapy pioneer, Kathleen Adams, started providing journal workshops, designed as a self-discovery process.

In the 1990s, James W. Pennebaker published multiple studies which affirmed that writing about emotional problems or traumas led to both physical and mental health benefits. These studies drew more attention to the benefits of writing as a therapy.

In the 2000s, journal therapy workshops were conducted at the Progoff's Dialogue House, Adams' Center for Journal Therapy and certificates were given through educational institutions. Generally, journal therapists obtain an advanced degree in psychology, counseling, social work, or another field and then enter a credentialing program or independent-study program.

== Effects ==
Journal therapy is a form of expressive therapy used to help writers better understand life's issues and how they can cope with these issues or fix them. The benefits of expressive writing include long-term health benefits such as better self-reported physical and emotional health, improved immune system, liver and lung functioning, improved memory, reduced blood pressure, fewer days in hospital, fewer stress-related doctor visits, improved mood and greater psychological well-being. Other therapeutic effects of journal therapy include the expression of feelings, which can lead to greater self-awareness and acceptance and can in turn allow the writer to create a relationship with his or herself. The short-term effects of expressive writing include increased distress and psychological arousal. Journaling has also been shown to improve mental health outcomes such as self-reflection and emotional management in juvenile prisoners.

== Practice ==
Many psychotherapists incorporate journal "homework" in their therapy but few specialize in journal therapy. Journal therapy often begins with the client writing a paragraph or two at the beginning of a session. These paragraphs would reflect how the client is feeling or what is happening in his or her life and would set the direction of the session. Journal therapy then works to guide the client through different writing exercises. Subsequently, the therapist and the client then discuss the information revealed in the journal. In this method, the therapist often assigns journal "homework" that is to be completed by the next session. Journal therapy can also be provided to groups.

== Techniques ==
Journal therapy consists of many techniques or writing exercises. In all journal therapy techniques, the writer is encouraged to date everything, write quickly, keep writings and always tell the complete truth. Some of the journal therapy techniques are as follows:

Sprint
Catharsis is encouraged by allowing a writer to write about anything for a designated period, such as for five minutes or for ten minutes.

Lists
The writer writes any number of connected items in order to help prioritize and organize.

Captured moments
Writer attempts to completely describe the essence and emotional experience of a memory.

Unsent letters
This attempts to silence a writer's internal censor; it can be used in a grieving process or to get over traumas, such as sexual abuse.

Dialogue
The writer creates both sides to a conversation involving anything, including but not limited to, people, the body, events, situations, time etc.

Feedback
Important to journal therapy as feedback makes the writer be aware of his or her feelings; it also allows the writer to acknowledge, accept and reflect on what they he/she has written before (thoughts, feelings, etc.).

== Setting ==
A quiet and private environment must be created and provided throughout the entire journal writing process. This environment should contain features or elements that can make the writer feel good such as music, candles, a hot drink etc. This environment works to empower the writer and to associate good feelings with journal writing. To transition into writing, a journal writing session can be started with a drawing or sketch. After journal writing, something active should be done, such as running, walking, stretching, breathing etc. or something that is enjoyable like taking a bubble bath, baking cookies, listening to music, talking to someone, etc.
