= Tracey Revenson =

American health psychologist

- Occupation: Professor of Psychology
- Awards: APA Nathan Perry Career Service Award in Health Psychology (2013); Society for Health Psychology Excellence in Health Psychology Mentoring Award (2019); Society of Behavioral Medicine Distinguished Mentor Award (2020)

Academic background
- Education: Yale College; New York University
- Thesis: Stressful life events, coping, and illness course among middle-aged and elderly diabetics: a prospective study.

Academic work
- Institutions: Hunter College; CUNY Graduate Center

Tracey A. Revenson is an American health psychologist known for her research on how people cope with chronic illness and how people's lifestyles can affect their health and influence their coping mechanisms. She holds the position of Professor of Psychology at Hunter College and the Graduate Center of the City University of New York, and directs the Coping and health in context (CHiC) lab.

Revenson was awarded the Nathan Perry Career Service Award in Health Psychology from the American Psychological Association (APA) Division 38 in 2013, the Society for Health Psychology Excellence in Health Psychology Mentoring Award in 2019, and the Society of Behavioral Medicine's 2020 Distinguished Mentor Award. In 2020 she was named a Fellow of the European Health Psychology Society.

== Biography ==
Revenson received a B.A. in psychology and theatre from Yale College, where she worked with Dorothy Singer. She completed a Ph.D. in psychology at New York University in 1982. Her Ph.D. thesis, conducted under the supervision of Barbara Felton and funded by the National Institutes of Mental Health, examined stress and coping strategies of middle-aged and elderly diabetics. After completing her Ph.D., she received post-doctoral training in social ecology at the University of California, Irvine. Revenson worked at Barnard College of Columbia University before joining the faculty of the CUNY Graduate Center in 1988.

Revenson was the founding Editor-in-Chief of Women's Health: Research on Gender, Behavior and Policy. She is the Editor-in-Chief of the Annals of Behavioral Medicine and on the editorial board of the International Journal of Behavioral Medicine. Revenson served as President of the Society for Health Psychology (APA Division 38) from 2004 to 2005.

== Research ==
Revenson's research program focuses on coping mechanisms of individuals dealing with chronic illnesses, such as asthma or cancer, and the social support provided by their loved ones, including how spouses can affect their partner's health. Other research has examined loneliness in elderly individuals, and its prevalence across different demographic groups. As examples of her varied research contributions, Revenson has studied how participating in self-help groups may help people who have scoliosis to adjust, how economic stress and mental health coincide, how age can play a role in determining which coping strategies individuals use and their effectiveness, and how coping strategies affect people's psychological symptoms. Revenson has also looked into expressive writing and how it can help people deal with trauma.

Her research has been funded by the National Cancer Institute of the National Institutes of Health.

== Books ==
- Baum, A., Revenson, T. A., & Singer, J. (2012). Handbook of health psychology. Psychology Press.
- Revenson, T. A., D'Augelli, A. R., French, S. E., Hughes, D., Livert, D. E., Seidman, E., ... & Yoshikawa, H. (Eds.). (2002). Ecological research to promote social change: Methodological advances from community psychology. Springer Science & Business Media.
- Revenson, T. A., Kayser, K. E., & Bodenmann, G. E. (Eds.) (2005). Couples coping with stress: Emerging perspectives on dyadic coping. American Psychological Association.
- Revenson, T. A., Saab, P. G., Zoccola, P. M., & Traeger, L. N. (2019). Becoming a health psychologist. Routledge.
- Singer, D. G., & Revenson, T. A. (1997). A Piaget primer: How a child thinks. International Universities Press, Inc.

== Representative publications ==
- Felton, B. J., & Revenson, T. A. (1984). Coping with chronic illness: a study of illness controllability and the influence of coping strategies on psychological adjustment. Journal of Consulting and Clinical Psychology, 52(3), 343–353.
- Felton, B. J., Revenson, T. A., & Hinrichsen, G. A. (1984). Stress and coping in the explanation of psychological adjustment among chronically ill adults. Social Science & Medicine, 18(10), 889–898.
- Revenson, T. A. (1994). Social support and marital coping with chronic illness. Annals of Behavioral Medicine, 16(2), 122–130.
- Revenson, T. A., Schiaffino, K. M., Majerovitz, S. D., & Gibofsky, A. (1991). Social support as a double-edged sword: The relation of positive and problematic support to depression among rheumatoid arthritis patients. Social Science & Medicine, 33(7), 807–813.
- Stanton, A. L., Revenson, T. A., & Tennen, H. (2007). Health psychology: psychological adjustment to chronic disease. Annual Review of Psychology, 58, 565–592.
