= Writing therapy =

Technique for self-guided improvement

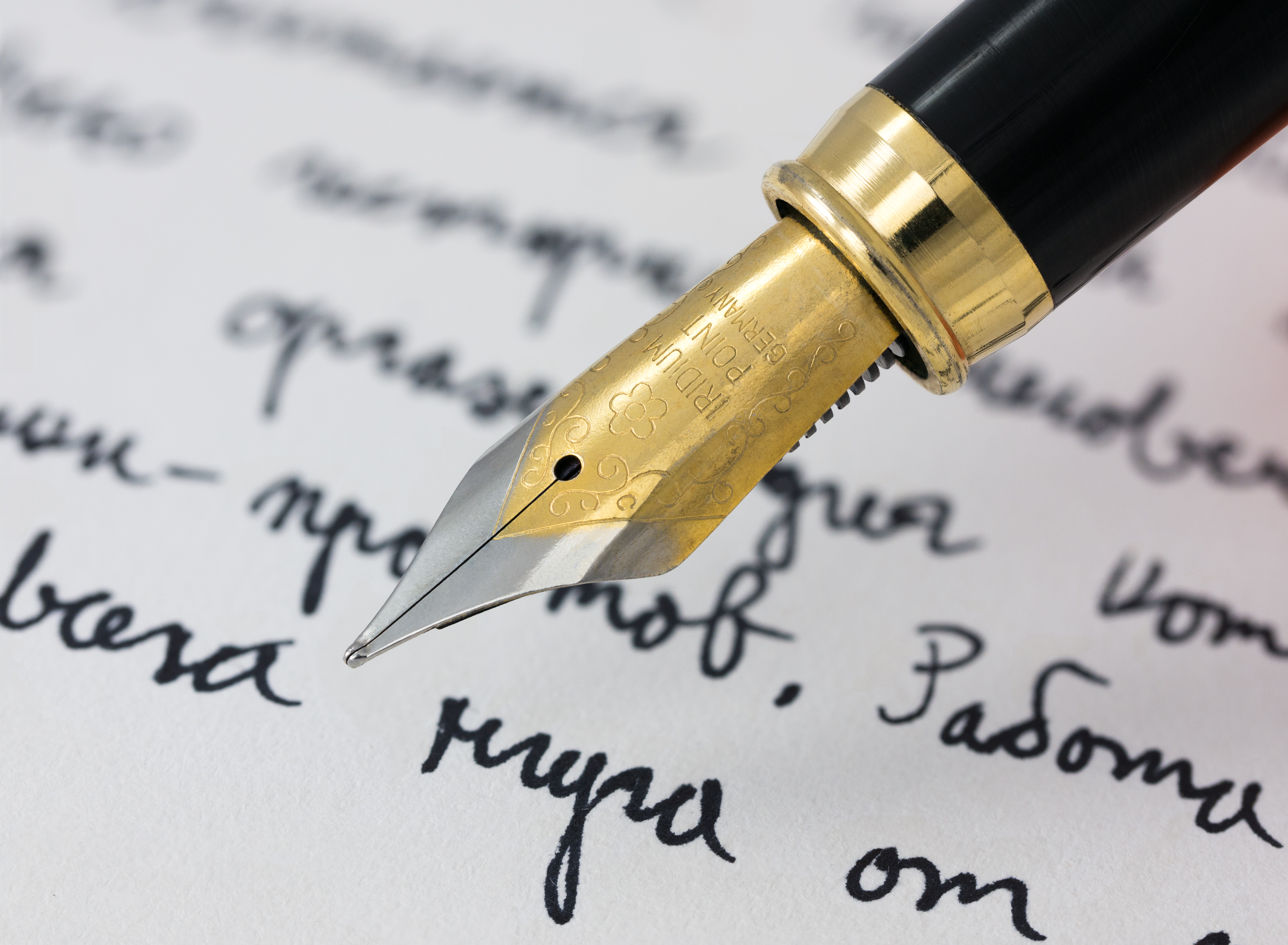
Writing therapy; relieving tension and emotion, establishing self-control and understanding the situation after words are transmitted on paper

Writing therapy is a form of expressive therapy that uses the act of writing and processing the written word in clinical interventions for healing and personal growth. Writing therapy posits that writing one's feelings gradually eases feelings of emotional trauma; studies have found this therapy primarily beneficial for alleviating stress caused by previously undisclosed adverse events and for those suffering from medical conditions associated with the immune system. Writing therapeutically can take place individually or in a group and can be administered in person with a therapist or remotely through mailing or the Internet.

The field of writing therapy includes many practitioners in a variety of settings, usually administered by a therapist or counselor. Writing group leaders also work in hospitals with patients dealing with mental and physical illnesses. In university departments, they aid student self-awareness and self-development. Online and distance interventions are useful for those who prefer to remain anonymous and/or are not ready to disclose their most private thoughts and anxieties in a face-to-face situation.

As with most forms of therapy, writing therapy is adapted and used to work with a wide range of psychoneurotic issues, including bereavement, desertion and abuse. Many interventions take the form of classes where clients write on specific themes chosen by the therapist or counselor. Assignments may include writing unsent letters to selected individuals, alive or dead, followed by imagined replies from the recipient, or a dialogue with the recovering alcoholic's bottle of alcohol.

== Research ==
=== Expressive writing paradigm ===
Expressive writing is a form of writing therapy developed primarily by James W. Pennebaker in the late 1980s. The seminal expressive writing study instructed participants in the experimental group to write about a 'past trauma', expressing their very deepest thoughts and feelings surrounding it. In contrast, control participants were asked to write as objectively and factually as possible about neutral topics (e.g., a particular room or their plans for the day) without revealing their emotions or opinions. Both groups wrote continuously for 15 minutes per day for 4 consecutive days. If participants felt they could not write any more details, they were instructed to return to the beginning, potentially repeating what they wrote or writing it in a different manner.

The following quote provides an example of writing instructions for expressive writing:

For the next 4 days, I would like you to write your very deepest thoughts and feelings about the most traumatic experience of your entire life or an extremely important emotional issue that has affected you and your life. In your writing, I'd like you to really let go and explore your deepest emotions and thoughts. You might tie your topic to your relationships with others, including parents, lovers, friends, or relatives; to your past, your present or your future; or to who you have been, who you would like to be or who you are now. You may write about the same general issues or experiences on all days of writing or about different topics each day. All of your writing will be completely confidential. Don't worry about spelling, grammar or sentence structure. The only rule is that once you begin writing, you continue until the time is up.

Pennebaker and his team took several measurements before and after, but the most striking finding was that relative to the control group, the experimental group made significantly fewer visits to a physician in the following months. Although many reported being upset by the writing experience, they also found it valuable and meaningful.

Pennebaker has either written or co-written over 130 articles on expressive writing. One publication suggested expressive writing may boost the immune system, perhaps explaining the reduction in physician visits. This was shown by measuring lymphocyte response to the foreign mitogens phytohaemagglutinin (PHA) and concanavalin A (ConA) just prior to and six weeks after writing. The significantly increased lymphocyte response led to speculation that expressive writing enhances immunocompetence. The results of a preliminary study of 40 people diagnosed with Major Depressive Disorder suggests that routinely engaging in expressive writing may be effective in reducing symptoms of depression.

Pennebaker's experiments have been widely replicated and validated. Following on from Pennebaker's original work, there has been a renewed interest in the therapeutic value of abreaction. This was first discussed by Josef Breuer and Freud in Studies on Hysteria but not much explored since. At the heart of Pennebaker's theory is the idea that actively inhibiting thoughts and feelings about traumatic events requires effort, serves as a cumulative stressor on the body, and is associated with increased physiological activity, obsessive thinking or ruminating about the event, and longer-term disease.

==== Criticism ====
As Baikie and Wilhelm note in following quote, the theory has intuitive appeal but mixed empirical support.

Studies have shown that expressive writing results in significant improvements in various biochemical markers of physical and immune functioning (Pennebaker et al, 1988; Esterling et al, 1994; Petrie et al, 1995; Booth et al, 1997). This suggests that written disclosure may reduce the physiological stress on the body caused by inhibition, although it does not necessarily mean that disinhibition is the causal mechanism underlying these biological effects. On the other hand, participants writing about previously undisclosed traumas showed no differences in health outcomes from those writing about previously disclosed traumas (Greenberg & Stone, 1992) and participants writing about imaginary traumas that they had not actually experienced, and therefore could not have inhibited, also demonstrated significant improvements in physical health (Greenberg et al, 1996). Therefore, although inhibition may play a part, the observed benefits of writing are not entirely due to reductions in inhibition.

In a 2013 article by Nazarian and Smyth, the salivary cortisol for 5 writing instructions for the expressive writing task were measured: cognitive processing, exposure, self-regulation, and benefit-finding, standard expressive writing. None of the conditions significantly influenced cortisol compared to control group, but instructions did impact mood differentially depending on the condition. The cognitive processing as measured post-intervention was influenced not only by the cognitive processing instructions but also, by exposure and benefit-finding. These results demonstrate a spillover effect from instructions to outcomes.

=== Other theories related to writing therapy ===
In related research, Travagin, Margola, Dennis, and Revenson compared cognitive-processing instructions to standard expressive writing for adolescents with peer problems. This research demonstrated better long-term social adjustment compared to standard expressive writing and greater increased positive affect for those adolescents who reported more peer problems than most.

An additional line of inquiry, which has particular bearing on the difference between talking and writing, derives from Robert Ornstein's studies into the bicameral structure of the brain.

Julie Gray, founder of Stories Without Borders notes that "People who have experienced trauma in their lives, whether or not they consider themselves writers, can benefit from creating narratives out of their stories. It is helpful to write it down, in other words, in safety and in non-judgment. Trauma can be quite isolating. Those who have suffered need to understand how they feel and also to try to communicate that to others."

== Potential clinical benefits ==
Additional research since the 1980s has demonstrated that expressive writing may act as an agent to increase long-term health. Expressive writing can result in physiological, psychological, and biological outcomes, and is part of the emerging medical humanities field. Experiments demonstrate quantitative physiological readouts such as changes in immune counts, and blood pressure, in addition to qualitative readouts relating to psychiatric symptoms. Past attempts at implementing expressive writing interventions in clinical settings indicate that there are potential benefits for treatment plans. However, the specifics of such expressive writing procedures or protocols, and the populations most likely to benefit are not entirely clear.

=== Expressive writing ===
One of the most important aspects of expressive writing used in therapy is the short-term, and long-term effects on the individuals participating. Karen Baikie and Kay Wilhelm go into a brief description of the effects people will have after completing a therapeutic expressive writing session.

While some people have experienced negative feelings, physical and mental, instantly after using expressive writing as a tool to cope, following up with clients after a longer amount of time to measure those effects finds evidence of many mental and physical health benefits.

These benefits include but are not limited to "reduced blood pressure, improved mood, reduced depressive symptoms, and fewer post-traumatic intrusion/avoidance symptoms."

This study also showed that these positive long-term emotional outcomes correlated to positive physical outcomes such as improved memory, improved performance at work, quicker re-employment, and many more. While the short-term effects of this therapeutic practice may seem daunting, they are just the steppingstones for individuals to begin a cycle of growth.

=== For cancer patients ===
Illness and disease are experienced on multiple different fronts: biological, psychological, and social. Recent research has explored how narrative medicine and expressive writing, independently, may play a therapeutic role in chronic diseases such as cancer. Comparisons in practice have been made between expressive writing and psychotherapy. Similarly, practices such as integrative, holistic, humanistic, or complementary medicine have already been incorporated into the field. Expressive writing is self-administered with minimal prompting. With further research and refinement, it may be used as a more cost-effective alternative to psychotherapy.

Recent experiments, systematic reviews, and meta-analyses examining the effects of expressive writing on ameliorating negative cancer symptoms yielded primarily non-significant initial results. However, analysis of sub-groups and moderating variables suggest that particular symptoms, or situations, may benefit some more than others with the implementation of an expressive writing intervention. For example, a review by Antoni and Dhabhar (2019) examined how psychosocial stress negatively impacts the immune response of patients with cancer. Even if an expressive writing intervention cannot directly impact cancer prognosis, it may play an important role in mediating factors such as chronic stress, trauma, depression, and anxiety.

=== War trauma victims ===
It is widely acknowledged that trauma is prevalent among veterans, and research indicates that writing therapy can play a significant role in their self-healing journey. A primary contributor to trauma is the sense of powerlessness. Writing facilitates self-healing against this sense of helplessness through the strategy of mythologization.

Neil P Baird defines mythologization as the process of establishing standardized narratives that transform uncontrollable events into ones that are contained and predictable. Janis Haswell expands on this concept by highlighting how individuals can utilize writing to manipulate and reshape the traumatic events they have experienced. This allows them to convey the emotional truths of their pasts to not only themselves but to others through the words on a page. Marian M MacCurdy has argued that there is a link between trauma and the brain, where traumatic events exist in the brain as images, rather than a clear and direct story, which causes difficulty for victims to describe their experiences fully. When victims decide to write these experiences down, it allows them to take control of the story and piece together the images they have held in their brains, which can help lead them to healing parts of that trauma.

Mark Bracher emphasizes the benefits of literacy in general for self-healing. His research indicates that literacy acknowledges the challenges veterans face during their deployment. This acknowledgement can in turn boost their morale and contribute to them feeling valued. Additionally, it aids in diminishing the recollection of distressing memories and reinforces one's sense of self-identity. Nancy Miller explores further the reinforcement of self-identity by examining Kim Phuc, a victim of napalm burns during the Vietnam War. In Kim's biographical memoir, she sought to transform her portrayal from that of a helpless child frightened by war into a tale of forgiveness. Her objective with her writing was to illustrate how she overcame her trauma from war through her deliberate effort to reshape her past with a more optimistic perspective.

=== Recovering from addiction ===
Writing therapy may play a significant role in recovery for individuals with a substance use disorder. Writing exercises have been found to have the potential to improve those in addiction recovery the ability to cope with their conditions, and overall health. When a person in addiction recovery is given writing exercises to complete, it can allow them to reflect on their past actions and figure out what they must do differently to improve their behavior. When they put together their stories, and discover that other people can relate to them, any negative feelings they may have felt, can potentially decrease as they get deeper into the writing therapy process.

Studies done involving creative writing and people who deal with substance abuse have shown to become more confident and develop a higher self-esteem. When therapists introduce creative writing as a healing tool, there are higher chances of a better relationship between the therapist and the patient.

== Forms ==
=== Distance therapies ===
With the accessibility provided by the Internet, the reach of writing therapies has increased considerably, as clients and therapists can work together from anywhere in the world, provided they can write the same language. They simply "enter" into a private "chat room" and engage in an ongoing text dialogue in "real-time". Participants can also receive therapy sessions via e-text and/or voice with video, and complete online questionnaires, handouts, workout sheets, and similar exercises.

This requires the services of a counselor or therapist, albeit sitting at a computer. Given the huge disjunction between the amount of mental illness compared with the paucity of skilled resources, new ways have been sought to provide therapy other than drugs. In the more advanced societies pressure for cost-effective treatments, supported by evidence-based results, has come from both insurance companies and government agencies. Hence the decline in long-term intensive psychoanalysis and the rise of much briefer forms, such as cognitive therapy.

While distance therapy has been deemed to be beneficial, therapists and patients have mentioned the downsides of treatment through a phone or video call. Some of these downsides include patients struggling to find a secluded place in their homes where they are comfortable being vulnerable. Therapists have also mentioned that distance therapy can be more draining than in-person therapy and more difficult to focus, for both the therapist and the patient. When they interact through a screen, the therapist has less ability to examine the patient's body language.

==== Via the Internet ====
Currently, the most widely used mode of Internet writing therapy is via e-mail (see analytic psychotherapist Nathan Field's paper "The Therapeutic Action of Writing in Self-Disclosure and Self-Expression"). It is asynchronous; i.e. messages are passed between therapist and client within an agreed time frame (for instance, one week), but at any time within that week. Where both parties remain anonymous the client benefits from the online disinhibition effect; that is to say, feels freer to disclose memories, thoughts, and feelings that they might withhold in a face-to-face situation. Both client and therapist have time for reflecting on the past and recapturing forgotten memories, time for privately processing their reactions and giving thought to their own responses. With e-therapy, space is eliminated, and time is expanded. Overall, it considerably reduces the amount of therapeutic input, as well as the speed and pressure that therapists habitually have to work under.

The anonymity and invisibility provides a therapeutic environment that comes much closer than classical analysis to Freud's ideal of the "analytic blank screen". Sitting behind the patient on the couch still leaves room for a multitude of clues to the analyst's individuality; e-therapy provides almost none. Whether distance and reciprocal anonymity reduces or increases the level of transference has yet to be investigated.

In a 2016 randomized controlled trial, expressive writing was tested against direction to an online support group for individuals with anxiety and depression. No difference between the groups was found. Both groups showed a moderate improvement over time but of a magnitude comparable to what one would expect to see over the time period concerned without intervention.

=== Journaling ===
The oldest and most widely practiced form of self-help through writing is that of keeping a personal journal or diary—as distinct from a diary or calendar of daily appointments—in which the writer records their most meaningful thoughts and feelings. Kathleen Adams states that through the act of journal writing, the writer is also able to "literally [read] his or her own mind" and thus "to perceive experiences more clearly and thus feels a relief of tension".

- Self-concealment
- Self-disclosure
- Reflective writing

=== Poetry ===
Poetry has been a very powerful form of writing for many and there are beneficial factors that correspond with writing and reading poetry. Alicia Ostriker explains how personal experience and memories, whether traumatic or repressed, can be tackled by the person through the artistic ability of writing and facing these emotions that have been neglected in order to release and ease a writer's pain. Robert Baden elaborates how poetry allows a wide range of emotions to be portrayed to describe the feeling or what the writer had felt within their experience to later allow others to engage and relate to their work. Baden expands this concept with the idea that no emotion is too grand or too small for poetry, which allows others to engage with the healing experience. Baden also points out that for there to be an act of healing and release between the emotions that have been held within the conscience, the writer must recognize that there must be a strong enough need to be vulnerable and willing to be able to confront these emotions and trust that the audience will then be able to relate and potentially make others want to use this written release within their own lives. Vasiliki Antzoulis believes that writers should be vulnerable because ignorance should never be the course of action when experiencing all kinds of emotions. Without the ability to talk about what the writer is experiencing, it becomes more difficult to understand what each of these emotions represents and how they affect the writer's current views of life.

Dale M. Bauer provides insight that poetry has the power to allow people to be able to talk about inner suffering without judgment and rather gain the ability to have others be able to compare and connect with the writer's experience. Bauer goes on to say that these experiences, no matter if they are good or bad, correspond with the human experience. Being able to have others relate to them allows the writer to feel supported and reflect on what has been shared and what they have obtained with this release and be able to begin healing. Veteran Writer, Liam Corley, healed significantly from his trauma through the means of poetry. By sharing this method with fellow veterans and examining its positive impacts, Corley's research indicates the concise nature and inherent significance of poetry works greatly for self-healing. This is because poetry fulfills the crucial need for self-expression and assists in providing a voice to those who have felt silenced. James W. Pennebaker has discovered that "writing about trauma allows writers to externalize an event, thereby detaching themselves from the experience" (Writing to Heal 98). Pennebaker argues that once the writer can free themselves from what has been weighing them down, they are then able to begin healing and decide whether they are going to learn from the experience, or if it is something that has been long overdue for a release. Benjamin Batzer recognized that only the writer knows what they have gone through, so the first steps into healing and coping with what life has given, we must first be able to talk about these experiences to take back the power and decide the next point of action.

== See also ==
- Journal therapy
- Medical humanities
- Graphic medicine
- Narrative criticism
- Storytelling
- Narration
- Slow medicine
- Health humanities
- Reflective writing
