= Translational Behavioral Medicine =

- Discipline: Behavioral medicine
- Language: English
- Edited by: Suzanne Miller-Halegoua

Publication details
- History: 2011-present
- Publisher: Oxford University Press
- Frequency: Quarterly
- Impact factor: 3.626 (2021)

Standard abbreviations
- ISO 4: Transl. Behav. Med.

Indexing
- ISSN: 1869-6716 (print); 1613-9860 (web)
- LCCN: 2011243704
- OCLC no.: 900966273

Links
- Journal homepage; Online archive

Translational Behavioral Medicine is a quarterly peer-reviewed medical journal covering behavioral medicine. It is one of two official journals of the Society of Behavioral Medicine. The journal was launched in 2011 by founding editor and editor in-chief, Bonnie Spring (Northwestern University Feinberg School of Medicine) with a team of field editors (Sherry Pagoto, Rodger Kessler, Brian Oldenburg, and Frank Keefe). By 2016, Translational Behavioral Medicine had been indexed in PubMed, MEDLINE, and Thomson Reuters, and earned its first impact factor. The journal was originally published by Springer Science+Business Media until January 1, 2018. Since then, it has been published by Oxford University Press. The current editor-in-chief is Cheryl L. Knott (University of Maryland). According to the Journal Citation Reports, the journal has a 2021 impact factor of 3.626.
