= Odette Wegwarth =

German psychologist

Odette Wegwarth (born 1973) is a German psychologist and educational researcher. She is primarily concerned with risk competence and risk information in the medical field, evidence-based decision making, and conflicts of interest in medicine. Her research findings are used in particular in medical continuing education and in the design of patient brochures. She is currently Heisenberg Professor for Risk Literacy & Evidence-Based Decisions at Charité hospital in Berlin.

== Biography ==
Odette Wegwarth studied psychology at the University of Potsdam, and obtained her Diplom (German degree roughly similar to a Masters) in 2003. After completing her degree, she moved to Berlin to do doctoral studies in psychology at the Humboldt University of Berlin. Her PhD was entitled "Deciding the fast & frugal way on the application of pharmacodiagnostic tests in cancer care?", and was completed in 2007.

Her first job as a postdoc was an appointment at the Max Planck Institute for Human Development, within the Harding Center for Risk Literacy. In 2008, she was promoted to research associate. Wegwarth obtained her Habilitation at the Charité in Berlin in 2015, which authorized her to teach medical sociology and rehabilitation science.

During 2015 and 2016, Wegwarth served as Chairwoman of the Board of the foundation Stiftung Gesundheitswesen (Foundation for Healthcare) in Berlin. After leaving this post, she returned to the Max Planck Institute for Human Development, this time as a senior research scientist and research group leader in the Adaptive Behavior and Cognition department. She was appointed as Heisenberg Professor at Charité in 2020, and remains in this position as of 2025.

== Awards and honors ==
- 2013: Early Investigator Award, Society of Behavioral Medicine
- 2016: Dr. Lothar and Martin Beyer Prize (3rd place) of the Deutsche Gesellschaft für Allgemeinmedizin und Familienmedizin (German Society for General Practice and Family Medicine)
