= Michelle Segar =

American academic

Michelle L. Segar
- Born: Flint, Michigan
- Education: University of Michigan
- Known for: Her work on creating sustainable health-related behaviors and suggesting that exercise should be "rebranded" as a vehicle of well-being to align with the science of motivation and decision making.
- Awards: Outstanding Dissertation, Society of Behavioral Medicine
- Scientific career
- Fields: Sustainable Behavior Change, Cultures of Health, Motivation, Positive Psychology
- Workplaces: University of Michigan

Michelle L. Segar is an American behavioral sustainability scientist, author, and speaker. She is known for her research on how to create autonomous and sustained motivation for self-care behaviors (e.g., exercise, sleep, eating). This work integrates ideas from marketing, persuasion, executive functioning, learning, goal pursuit, positive psychology, organizational change, behavioral economics, and socialization to understand and leverage the unconscious influences on the daily decision making that underlies sustained health, fitness, and well-being. She has written two books. One book is about the science behind lasting exercise motivation, No Sweat: How the Simple Science of Motivation Can Bring You a Lifetime of Fitness. The other, The Joy Choice: How to Finally Achieve Lasting Changes in Eating and Exercise, explains the new science and method for breaking down all-or-nothing thinking and cultivating the in-the-moment decisions that support sustainable self-care, health, and well-being. Reviewing this book for The Washington Post in 2022, health columnist Gretchen Reynolds wrote: "It offers gentle, practical guidance about how to stop setting and then backsliding on ambitious exercise and eating goals and instead find the 'perfect imperfect option' that motivates us … now."

== Biography ==
Michelle Segar received her undergraduate degree from the University of Michigan's Residential College, where she studied how socialization and culture influence attitudes, motivation, and behavior. Between her undergraduate and graduate education she worked for the 25th Olympic Committee in Barcelona, Spain where she also ran with the Olympic Torch. After Segar received master's degrees in Kinesiology (M.S.) and in Health Behavior-Health Education (M.P.H.), she studied for and was awarded a doctorate in Personality Psychology (PhD) at the University of Michigan. Her dissertation on how exercise goals undermine or promote sustainable behavior was selected as the 2008 Outstanding Dissertation by the Society of Behavioral Medicine. Segar's research is published in scientific journals and has formed the basis of recommendations and behavioral trainings used in health care, public health, health promotion, corporate well-being, and fitness contexts. In addition to being on the faculty at the University of Michigan. Segar has also been a health coach to individuals for almost 30 years. She has been an advisor to IHRSA (The Global Health & Fitness Association), the Department of Health and Human Services, WELCOA (The Wellness Council of America), as well as a speaker for the World Health Organization, and director of the University of Michigan Sports, Health, and Activity Research and Policy Center.

== Research ==
Segar conducts interdisciplinary, translational research at the University of Michigan. Her work focuses on the messages and methods that guide people to consistently choose health-related behaviors (e.g., walking, healthy eating, sleep) and create sustainable behavioral changes.

Segar was the first researcher to recommend that exercise should be rebranded (away from medicine and health) as a vehicle to foster daily energy, well-being, and success. She has found that self-care behaviors (exercise, dietary change, sleep) are not compelling for many adults when motivation is linked to future and/or abstract goals related to clinical health outcomes. Instead, Segar's research suggests that promoting health behaviors based on their instantaneous payoffs and their role in fueling intrinsic values/identity more reliably results in sustained motivation and behavior.

These recommendations to improve public health were picked up by the American mass media, including a New York Times featured interview and other national and international news sources. Her research on rebranding exercise has also been used by the United States Department of Health and Human Services, the American College of Sports Medicine, and the World Health Organization.

Segar was the inaugural Chair of the U.S. National Physical Activity Plan's Communications Committee (2014–2017), charged with advising the Plan on more persuasive messaging strategies for American citizens and policy makers. She delivered a Presidential Lecture at the American College of Sport Medicine's 2017 annual conference and her work is being integrated into health coaching protocols, digital health, and diabetes prevention programs in the United States.
