= Kevin Masters =

Kevin Masters may refer to:

- Kevin Masters (cricketer) (born 1961), English cricketer
- Kevin Masters (psychologist), American psychologist
- Kevin Masters (EastEnders), fictional character
