= Parent–teacher conference =

Short meeting between parents and teachers

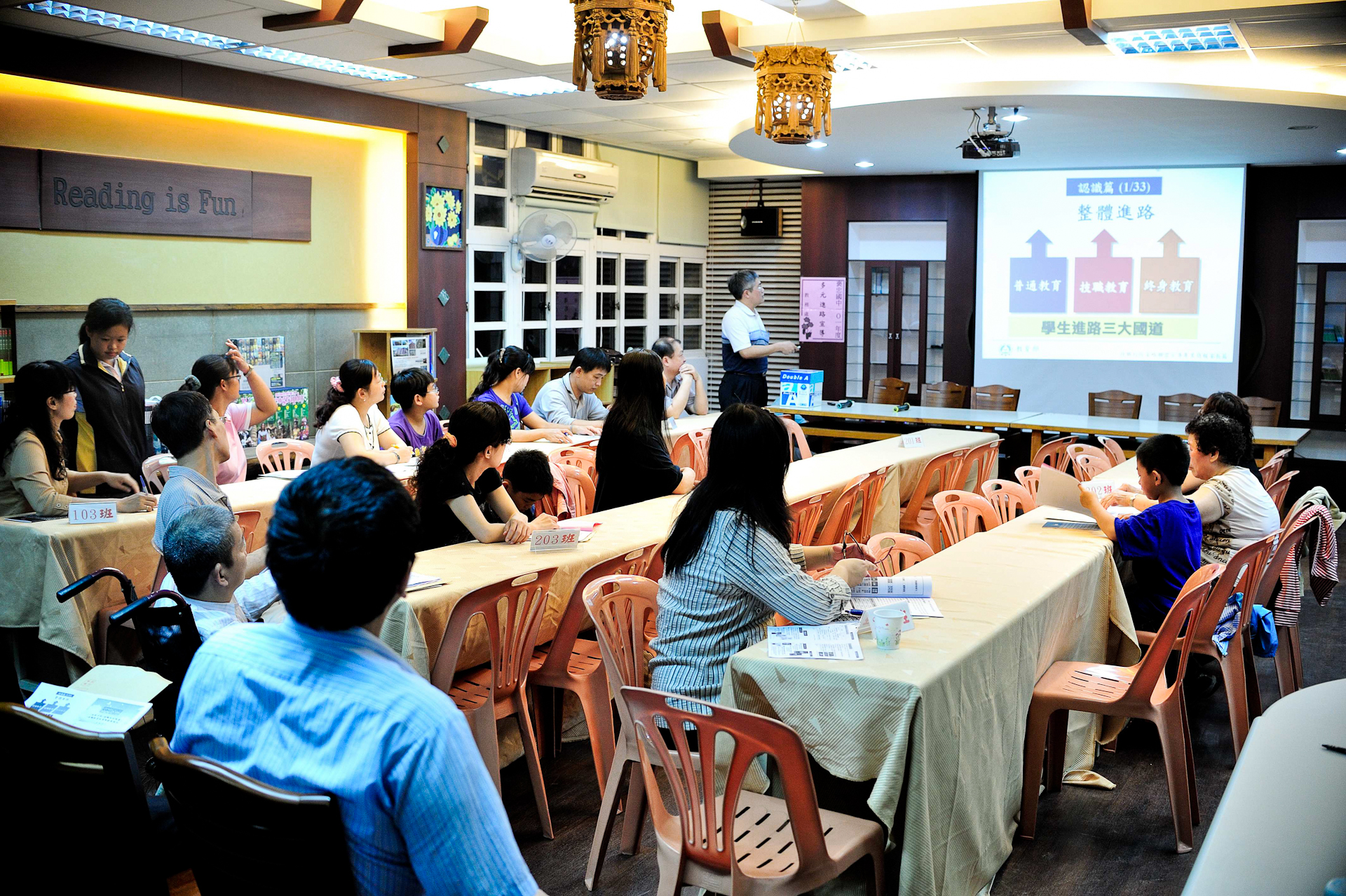
A parent teacher meeting at a junior high school in Taiwan

A parent–teacher conference, parent–teacher interview, parent–teacher night, parents' evening or parent teacher meeting is a short meeting or conference between the parents and teachers of students to discuss a child's progress at school and find solutions to academic or behavioral problems. Parent–teacher conferences supplement the information conveyed by report cards by focusing on students' specific strengths and weaknesses in individual subjects and generalizing the level of inter-curricular skills and competences.

Most conferences take place without the presence of the students whose progress is being discussed, although there is evidence that their inclusion increases the productivity of the meetings. The meetings are generally led by teachers who take a more active role in information sharing, with parents relegated mostly to the role of listeners.

== Types ==
Parent–teacher conferences exist in a variety of different forms, depending on a country, school district and individual school. The subtypes are characterized by the following attributes.

=== Mode ===
Like most other meetings, parent–teacher conferences can take the form of face-to-face meetings in which parents and teachers meet in person, or electronic meetings that are conducted over the phone or via video conferencing systems like Microsoft Teams, Zoom or Google Meet. Face-to-face meetings offer personal contact but require that parents and teachers meet at physically the same place during the meeting. These interviews are usually between five and fifteen minutes long.

In case of electronic parent–teacher conferences, neither parents nor teachers need to be at school or other common location and can participate in the meeting from home or while working or traveling. The school does not need to reserve rooms for the meetings and there is more flexibility in finding suitable time. The disadvantages of electronic are a lack of face time that many participants are used to and a need for the availability to unfailing technology.

Parent–teacher interviews are a tradition in Western school systems, such as Australia, Canada, the UK and the United States. In the United States, many elementary schools will shorten the school day by 2–3 hours (often for an entire week) in mid fall to allow extra time for teachers to give these conferences.

=== Participants ===
Parent–teacher conferences can be

- one-on-one meetings between a parent and a teacher. This type is used when different subjects are taught by different teachers and parents meet the teachers for all different subjects individually. The type offers most confidentiality and allows the discussion of information specific to a student in a particular subject. The downside of the type is that the meetings are hard to schedule because they require multiple time slots and meeting places.
- many-to-one meeting is a meeting between multiple parents and one teacher. Usually the students whose parents attend the meeting are in the same class/year and the teacher is either the teacher of a particular subject or the assigned class teacher. This type is common in elementary schools. It is relatively easy to schedule but lacks privacy for discussing the progress of particular students.
- one-to-many meeting between one parent and multiple teachers. This type can be used if a child has problems in multiple subjects or when a parent comes to school outside the regularly scheduled parent–teacher conference time to meet several teachers at once.
- many-to-many meetings between multiple parents and multiple teachers. This type of meeting is easy to use for electing board members or disseminating general information about school, calendar of events, changes in common regulations, etc. It is inefficient for discussing issues that are specific of particular students and lacks needed privacy.

=== Frequency ===
Parent–teacher conferences usually take place once every school term, although some schools organize only one meeting during (mostly at the beginning of) the school year.

=== Duration ===
The duration of parent–teacher conferences depends on the frequency of conferences and the number of participating parents and teachers. Annual meetings with multiple participants may last two hours or longer; one-to-many and many-to-one meetings once a term may last for an hour; one-on-one meetings once a year may last 15 minutes, one-on-one meetings once a term tend to last 5–10 minutes.

=== Location ===
Most face-to-face meetings take place at school. One-to-many meetings may take place in separate meeting rooms, many-to-one meetings in larger classrooms and one-to-one and many-to-one meetings in the school hall, aula or auditorium, with many one-to-one meetings happening simultaneously in different parts of the room.

== Regional variations ==
=== Australia ===
In Australian educational system, the meetings are known as parent–teacher interviews or parents' nights. The exact practice varies by state and by school type. Some states mandate that the interviews be conducted, others do not. Government and non-government schools also follow different federal educational laws.

Some schools have only one round of interviews per year, others have more. Two rounds is common, with terms 1 (February–April) and 3 (July–September) being popular times. Many schools offer multiple dates, splitting interviews either by class or by name (e.g. a-k/l-z).

There is often keen demand by parents for times with teachers, though a common observation from teachers is that it is the parents who they do not need to see who attend interviews, while parents who should attend often do not.

=== Canada ===
In Canadian educational system, the meetings are known as parent–teacher interviews.

Parent–teacher interviews are mandatory for all Ontario (Canada) elementary and secondary school teachers. Parents have the right to be allotted time for this purpose under the Ministry of Education.

Canadian Living criticizes parent–teacher interviews for their class bias. Often only the most privileged children's parents will attend the interviews and the children more likely to need extra assistance will not have their parents attend.

=== India ===
In India, the meeting is known as parent–teacher meeting or simply PTM. A shortened phrase parents' meeting is also commonly used.

=== Singapore ===
In Singapore, the meeting is known as parent–teacher meeting.

=== United States ===
In US educational system, the meeting is known as parent–teacher conference.

The conferences are usually held twice a year, at the end of the first quarter and at the end of the third quarter, with each meeting lasting about 15–20 minutes. The parents typically choose the time that is best for them, and the teacher schedules the conference accordingly. The specific practices vary within school districts.

In the United States, many elementary schools will shorten the school day by 2–3 hours (often for an entire week) in mid fall to allow extra time for teachers to give these conferences.

The difference between parent–teacher conferences and a PTA meetings is that the former focus on students' academic progress while the latter organize more extra-curricular activities.

Some counties in the US have proposed to consider it a legal violation for parents or guardians who fail to attend at least one parent–teacher conference during the school year. Some charter schools have already made the event a required event for parents to attend.

=== United Kingdom ===
In UK educational system, the meeting is known as parent–teacher conference or parents' evening. The event is often held in the school hall and adjacent communal spaces where parents move through a series of eight to nine face-to-face 5 minute consultations with individual teachers. Some schools during 2020 and 2021 replaced this with an online version due to COVID-19.

== Scheduling ==
=== The task ===
Scheduling parent–teacher conferences involves finding a time that suits both parents and teachers with their existing time constraints and finding locations for the meetings. If all meetings would be independent without any dependencies, the planning of the meetings simplifies to unordered timetabling rather than full-scale scheduling where events need to be scheduled in a certain order, often because the output of one event forms an input for another.

In most cases, certain dependencies exist: parents prefer not to wait too long between different interviews but need long enough breaks to move from one location to another or locations in close proximity. Also sometimes these conferences can be done online. These conferences talk about a child's or student's grade.

=== Methods ===
Various methods exist for scheduling parent–teacher conferences.

In the simplest case, the meetings are not pre-scheduled at all, parents come to school and line up to see each teacher they want to see. Meetings happen on a first-come basis.

Meetings can be scheduled in person, by phone or online.

==== In person ====
In person scheduling can be done in two ways:

1. Parents come to school's administrative office to schedule meetings; scheduling is done by a school administrator.
2. Students schedule meeting times with teachers by carrying a booking sheet and asking teachers to allocate times that are still available. Teachers have their own booking sheet and they mark the time on both sheets. Parents usually have the option of indicating which teachers they wish to see and the preferred times.

The advantage of the first is that teachers need not be involved in scheduling, the disadvantages are that a special middleman is required. The method is centralized in the sense that it is directed by neither a parent nor a teacher.

The advantage of the second is that parents need not be involved in scheduling, the disadvantages are that teachers need to do the scheduling after their classes are over or during break times that they would otherwise need for rest, prepare for classes or advising students, parents do not know which slots the teachers have available and often get times that aren't suitable or optimal (booking schedules are optimized from the point of view of the teacher, not the parent); if a student doesn't want his/her parent to see teachers, all he/she may just not make the bookings, or leave it so late that there are no times available.

==== By phone ====
Scheduling by phone also involves a parent and a school administrator to do the scheduling without parents needing to be physically at school at the time of the scheduling. In principle, the middlemen could be avoided by automated scheduling by phone but is currently hindered by the lack of sophisticated speech analysis. This process can cause high levels of demand on school offices.

==== Online ====
Online scheduling is done by using appointment scheduling software on the internet. The advantages of the system are that it is automated without a need for a middleman, centrally optimized both for parents and for teachers without the need to involve students.

=== Complexity ===
Computationally, the scheduling problem is a NP-complete problem and in the same complexity class with other problems that involve constraint satisfaction and combinatorial optimization (so no fast algorithms are known for solving it).

This can be seen as follows. We can check in time polynomial to the input size whether certain time slot assignment satisfies parent–teacher conference scheduling (PTCS) constraints. Therefore, PTCS ∈ NP. Ignoring constraints that complicate scheduling even further, let's only consider the constraints on parent availability (e.g. assuming that all teachers, rooms and time slots are always available). Then there exists a simple polynomial transformation of the class-teacher assignment problem with teacher availability constraints (CTTA) in school timetable construction to the PTCS problem: namely, map class instances to teacher instances, teacher instances to parent instances, time slots to time slots (identity map), and teacher availability to parent availability. So if the PTCS problem were polynomial-time solvable by some algorithm, the transformation described above and the algorithm could be used to solve the CTTA problem too and the CTTA task would be polynomially solvable as well. But CTTA has been earlier proved to be NP-complete by the reduction from the NP-complete 3-SAT problem, so the PTC scheduling problem cannot be polynomially solvable either, and has to be NP-complete.

== Management ==
Optimized scheduling is advantageous only as long as the participants keep to the schedule by attending the meetings and starting and finishing on time. The latter can be achieved by a school bell or electronic voice-over message played over the school PA system, at each change of interview time (E.g. "Please move to your next interview"), avoiding to schedule very short interview times that are harder to keep running on time, scheduling empty slots at intervals to assist in bringing events back onto time if they are running over. General time management techniques apply.

=== On-time running ===
Parents sometimes complain that schedules are not running on time, causing them to miss interviews, or be cut short. This is usually due to either parents or teachers electing to continue talking beyond their booked time slot. One factor that naturally reduces this effect is the presence of another parent ready to start the next interview and clearly in view of the teacher. There are several other options that can assist on-time running of events:

- Bell, chime or electronic voice-over automatically played over the school PA system, at each change of interview time. (E.g. "Please move to your next interview")
- Large clock display projected on the hall screen, ensuring there is no doubt of the exact time, and encouraging participants to be mindful of the time.
- Strongly reminding, and encouraging teachers to stick to advertised times.
- Steering away from very short interview times, which are harder to maintain on-time running (e.g. 5 minutes), in favour of slightly longer duration interviews that may better suit the time required to talk about issues. Short durations like five minutes ensure more can fit into the event, yet if on-time running fails, the benefit is lost.
- Provision of spacer interview slots at intervals for all teachers with busy schedules, to act as a time buffer – assisting in bringing events back onto time if they are running over.
- Systems that offer optimised scheduling of interviews can provide significantly more compact parent schedules. Parents then have reason to finish their current conversation on time, namely to get to their own next meeting. The natural tendency is often for parents stay longer at an interview, which may be acceptable if both the parent and the teacher do not have another interview immediately following. Optimised parent schedules are also beneficial to the parents by reducing time on-site, and by significantly reducing numbers of idle parents (event congestion).

== Discussion ==
Parent–teacher conferences have been criticized for their class bias and inefficiency because the meetings are attended mostly by the parents of more privileged children, while the parents of the children who are more likely to need extra assistance do not attend.

== See also ==
- Educational assessment
- Personal development planning
- Parent Teacher Organization
