= A. Janet Tomiyama =

American health psychologist

- Occupation: Professor

Academic background
- Education: Cornell University University of California, Los Angeles

Academic work
- Discipline: Health psychology
- Main interests: Dieting, eating behavior, stress, weight stigma, plant-based eating and alternative proteins
- Website: DiSH Lab

A. Janet Tomiyama is a health psychologist and professor at the University of California, Los Angeles. She is the principal investigator of the Diet, Stigma, and Health (DiSH) Laboratory and studies the consequences of stress, dieting, and fat shaming on health.

== Education ==
Tomiyama received her B.A. in Psychology from Cornell University in 2001 and finished cum laude. She received her M.A. in social psychology from the University of California, Los Angeles in 2004. She graduated with her Ph.D. in social psychology and minors in health psychology and quantitative psychology from the University of California, Los Angeles in 2009.

== Career ==
From 2009-2011, Tomiyama completed the Robert Wood Johnson Foundation Health and Society Scholars fellowship jointly at the University of California, San Francisco and the University of California, Berkeley. Between 2011-2012, Tomiyama worked as an assistant professor in Rutgers University's Psychology and Nutritional Sciences departments. She is now a professor in the Psychology Department at the University of California, Los Angeles.

== Honors and awards ==
Her work has been recognized by early career awards from the Association for Psychological Science, the Society for Behavioral Medicine, and the Society for Health Psychology. She has also received several teaching and mentoring awards from the University of California, Los Angeles, including the Distinguished Faculty Teaching Award in 2016 and Faculty Award for Excellence in Graduate Student Mentoring in 2025.

== Research ==
Tomiyama’s research has been funded by the National Institutes of Health, the National Science Foundation, and the Robert Wood Johnson Foundation, among others.

=== COBWEBS Model ===
Tomiyama is best known for her Cyclic Obesity/Weight-Based Stigma (COBWEBS) model that combines perspectives from social psychology, health psychology, and neuroendocrinology. This model states that weight stigma causes weight gain by acting as a psychological stressor that increases cortisol and comfort eating. As a social-evaluative threat, weight stigma is highly effective at increasing cortisol secretion, which enhances food consumption and amplifies fat deposition. It also sensitizes the food reward system and elicits shame, a key emotion activating the HPA axis and driving cortisol secretion. The resulting weight gain makes individuals more susceptible to further weight stigma, creating a positive feedback loop, or vicious cycle, that is difficult to escape.

=== Calorie-restricting diets ===
In a review, Tomiyama explains why calorie restricting diets are not an effective treatment for obesity. One to two thirds of dieters end up gaining more weight than they lose, making the diets counterproductive. Additionally, studies in the field overestimate effectiveness and underestimate counterproductivity of calorie restricting diets due to methodological issues, such as lack of control groups, low follow-up rate, and self-reported measures of weight. Results may also be confounded with exercise and participation in additional diets. Moreover, studies fail to show evidence that diets improve health outcomes, regardless of weight loss.

Thus, she recommends that Medicare should not fund calorie-restricting diets as an obesity treatment, and instead of further studying diets for weight loss, researchers should study effects of dieting on short and long-term health outcomes.

=== Stress and obesity ===
Tomiyama outlines the cycle that links stress to obesity to stigma that then circles back to stress. Cognitive, behavioral, physiological, and biochemical paths connect stress and obesity. Cognitively, stress reduces self-regulation and leads to more unhealthy eating. Behaviorally, stress induces stress eating, decreases physical activity, and disrupts sleep. Physiologically, stress activates the HPA axis to secrete cortisol (increasing eating and fat deposition), alters reward processing to increase intake of highly palatable foods, and affects the gut microbiome. Biochemically, stress causes resistance to leptin, an appetite suppressing hormone. The social and evaluative nature of weight stigma are likely to make it extremely stressful, in turn creating negative outcomes for future weight gain and obesity.

== Media coverage ==
Tomiyama's research has received coverage in mainstream media outlets including the LA Times, NY Times, NPR, BBC News, USA Today, Chicago Tribune, and CBS News.

== Written works ==
She has also collaborated with other researchers to write chapters in several books, including in Handbook of Food and Addiction, Nutrition in the Prevention and Treatment of Abdominal Obesity, and Oxford Handbook of Stigma, Discrimination, and Health.
