= Monica Baskin =

American psychologist

Monica L. Baskin
- Education: Emory University; Georgia State University
- Scientific career
- Workplaces: Virginia Commonwealth University
- Thesis: A psychoeducational group intervention for adolescents diagnosed with sickle cell disease (SCD) (1999)

Monica Baskin is an American psychologist and behavioral scientist, whose research focuses on cancer prevention, behavioral medicine, and health equity. She is Director of the VCU Massey Comprehensive Cancer Center, Associate Dean for Cancer Innovation and professor of hematology, oncology and palliative care at the Virginia Commonwealth University School of Medicine. She also has a secondary appointment as professor of social and behavioral sciences in the VCU School of Public Health.

She is a former president of the Society of Behavioral Medicine and recently chaired the cancer incidence panel for the World Cancer Research Fund International’s Global Cancer Update Program.

== Early life and education ==
Baskin grew up in Southwest Atlanta. Her mother and father were from rural Georgia and Alabama, respectively. They each grew up in communities with limited resources and during a time of legal racial segregation, but they focused on education and faith as a means to overcome obstacles. These principles were put to use when her father was diagnosed with eye neoplasm when he was in his late adolescence, and ultimately lost his eye. Baskin’s parents met while they attended college in Atlanta, GA. Growing up, Baskin and her older sister attended schools and socialized with the children of multiple African American civil rights leaders, educators, business owners, lawmakers, clergy, and the like. She credits the values instilled by her parents and seeing many examples of civic engagement and professional excellence in her community as the foundation of how she works.

Later, while Baskin was in high school, her father died from his second cancer after being diagnosed at an advanced stage of the disease. This loss influenced her interest in understanding cancer, health disparities, and the barriers that affect access to prevention, early detection, and care, particularly among communities that have historically experienced worse outcomes.

Baskin studied psychology and sociology at Emory University before completing graduate training at Georgia State University, where she earned a master's degree in community counseling and a doctoral degree in counseling psychology. Her interdisciplinary training in psychology, counseling, and public health shaped her later research in behavioral medicine, cancer prevention, and community-engaged research.

After completing her doctoral training, Baskin returned to Emory University, where she completed a pediatric psychology fellowship prior to obtaining her license as a professional psychologist.

== Research and career ==
Baskin's research focuses on behavioral medicine, cancer prevention and early detection, obesity, and community-engaged approaches to improving health outcomes and eliminating health disparities. Her work examines how social, behavioral, and environmental factors influence health outcomes and how community-based interventions can improve health outcomes for all.

In the early stages of her career, Baskin investigated behavioral and psychological factors related to chronic disease prevention, including obesity and health behaviors. Her research contributed to understanding obesity prevalence and the role of behavioral interventions in improving health outcomes among diverse populations.

In 2005, Baskin co-authored a review examining the prevalence of obesity in the United States and factors contributing to obesity trends. Her later work expanded into community-based health promotion, including research on faith-based interventions as a strategy for addressing health disparities. In 2007, she co-authored "Church-Based Health Promotion Interventions: Evidence and Lessons Learned," which examined the effectiveness of partnerships between researchers and faith communities to promote health behaviors.

In 2013 Baskin coordinated the report "PLACE MATTERS for Health in Jefferson County, Alabama: The Status of Health Equity on the 50th Anniversary of the Civil Rights Movement in Birmingham, Alabama". The report was released fifty years after the protests in Birmingham marking when the Jim Crow laws were overruled. The report collected information of life expectancy, infant mortality and access to healthy food in various areas across the county, and studied how they depended on the demographics of the communities (including ethnicity and socioeconomic status). She identified that Black mothers in Jefferson County were 2.5 times more likely to die during child birth as white mothers, and that Black households in Jefferson County had annual incomes $22,000 below the federal poverty guideline. The report made a series of recommendations, including funding early childhood education programmes, implementing financial programmes to provide healthy food in poor neighbourhoods and expanding Medicaid.

In 2015 Baskin was awarded an National Cancer Institute grant to develop strategies to prevent obesity in African American women. Her research has shown the close relationships between cancer and obesity, and identified that African American women are most at risk.

At the University of Alabama at Birmingham, Baskin served as Director of Community Outreach and Engagement at the O'Neal Comprehensive Cancer Center, an NCI-designated Comprehensive Cancer Center. In this role, she led community-engaged research initiatives designed to strengthen partnerships between researchers, healthcare providers, and communities. Her work focused on improving cancer prevention, screening participation, research engagement, and access to health resources among underserved populations.

In 2020, Baskin was elected President of the Society of Behavioral Medicine, a professional organization focused on advancing behavioral science research and practice to improve health outcomes.

In 2022, Baskin moved to Pittsburgh, PA where she served as Associate Director for Community Outreach and Engagement and Associate Director for Health Equity and subsequently promoted to Deputy Director of UPMC Hillman Cancer Center. She was also professor of internal medicine and Assistant Vice Chancellor for Community Health Equity at the University of Pittsburgh.

In 2025, Baskin joined Virginia Commonwealth University as Deputy Director of Research at the VCU Massey Comprehensive Cancer Center and Associate Dean for Cancer Innovation in the VCU School of Medicine. She also joined the faculty as professor of hematology, oncology and palliative care and professor of social and behavioral sciences.

In 2026, Baskin was appointed Director of the VCU Massey Comprehensive Cancer Center, where she oversees the cancer center's research, clinical, education, and community engagement missions. She is the first Black woman to serve as director of an NCI-designated cancer center.

== Selected publications ==
- Baskin, M. L.; Ard, J.; Franklin, F.; Allison, D. B. (2005). "Prevalence of obesity in the United States". Obesity Reviews. 6 (1): 5–7. doi:10.1111/j.1467-789X.2005.00165.x. ISSN 1467-7881. PMID 15655032. S2CID 41526232.
- Campbell, Marci Kramish; Hudson, Marlyn Allicock; Resnicow, Ken; Blakeney, Natasha; Paxton, Amy; Baskin, Monica (2007-03-16). "Church-Based Health Promotion Interventions: Evidence and Lessons Learned". Annual Review of Public Health. 28 (1): 213–234. doi:10.1146/annurev.publhealth.28.021406.144016. ISSN 0163-7525. PMID 17155879.
- * Lumpkins, Crystal Y; Dibble, Kate E.; Baskin, Monica; Ceballos, Rachel M.; Rodriguez Espinosa, Patricia; Lewis-Thames, Marquita W.; Pratt, Rebekah; Kleckner, Amber; Kim Yeary, Karen H.; Sheinfeld Gorin, Sherri; McLeod, Andrew; Manne, Sharon; Niranjan, Soumya J. (2026) (2026). "Centering Community-engaged Research in NCI Cancer Centers: Optimizing Community Outreach & Engagement (COE)". JNCI Cancer Spectrum. 10 (3) pkag025. doi:10.1093/jncics/pkag025. PMC 13175176. PMID 41866302.
- Ard, JD; Carson, TL; Shikany, JM; Hardy, CM; Robinson, JC; Williams, AG; Baskin, ML (2017). "Weight loss and improved metabolic outcomes amongst rural African American women in the Deep South: six month outcomes from a community-based randomized trial". Journal of Cancer Education. 282 (1): 102–113. doi:10.1007/s13187-026-02938-6. PMID 42426323.
- Courtney, Emily P.; Meade, Cathy D.; Gwede, Clement K.; Barrios-Monroy, Veronica; Scarinci, Isabel C.; Menon, Usha; Baskin, Monica; Schwartz, David; Peek, Monica E.; Vines, Anissa I.; Peoples, Z'Kera; Vishwanatha, Jamboor K.; Martin, Michelle; Christy, Shannon M. (2026). "Development of a Community-engaged Research Training Workshop for Clinician-Scientists and Early-stage Investigators". Journal of Cancer Education. doi:10.1007/s13187-026-02938-6. PMID 42426323.
- Shikany, J; Carson, TL; Hardy, CM; Li, Y; Sterling, S; Hardy, S; Walker, C; Baskin, ML (2018). "Assessment of the nutrition environment in rural counties in the Deep South". Journal of Nutritional Science. 7 (27) e27. doi:10.1017/jns.2018.18. PMC 6218927. PMID 30402218.

== Awards and honours ==
- 1997 American Psychological Association Minority Fellow
- 2007 Jefferson County Public Health Hero Awards
- 2013 University of Alabama Institute for Rural Health Research Rural Health Heroes Award
- 2016 Max Cooper Award for Excellence in Research
- 2016 Robert Wood Johnson Foundation (RWJF) Culture of Health Leader
- 2017 Fellow of the Society of Behavioral Medicine
- 2021 Dorothy Booz Black Award, Society of Counseling Psychology
- 2023 Fellow of the Academy of Behavioral Medicine Research

== Personal life ==
Baskin and her husband Stacy have two daughters, Kennedy and Alexandria.
