= Reflective writing =

Analytical practice used in scholarship and education

Reflective writing is an analytical practice in which the writer describes a real or imaginary scene, event, interaction, passing thought, or memory and adds a personal reflection on its meaning. Many reflective writers keep in mind questions such as "What did I notice?", "How has this changed me?" or "What might I have done differently?" when reflecting. Thus, in reflective writing, the focus is on writing that is not merely descriptive. The writer revisits the scene to note details and emotions, reflect on meaning, examine what went well or revealed a need for additional learning, and relate what transpired to the rest of life. Reflection has been defined as "a mode of inquiry: a deliberate way of systematically recalling writing experiences to reframe the current writing situation." The more someone reflectively writes, the more likely they are to reflect in their everyday life regularly, think outside the box, and challenge accepted practices.

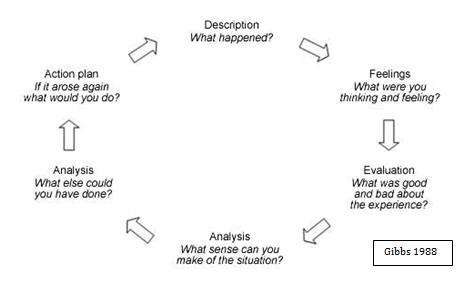
Adaptation of learning researcher Graham Gibbs's model of reflection

== Background ==
When writing reflectively, a writer attempts to convey their own thought process. Therefore, reflective writing is one of the more personal styles of writing as the writer is clearly inserted into the work. This style of writing invites both the reader and the writer to introspect and examine their own thoughts and beliefs, and gives the writer and the reader a closer relationship.

Reflective writing tends to consist of description, or explaining the event and its context; interpretation, or how the experience challenged existing opinions; and outcome, or how the experience contributed to personal or professional development.

Most reflective writing is written in first person, as it speaks to the writer's personal experience, but often it is supplemented with third person in academic works as the writer must support their perspective with outside evidence.

Reflective writing is usually a style that must be learned and practiced. Most novice writers are not reflective initially and must progress from imitative writing to their own style of genuine, critical reflection.

Kathleen Blake Yancey notes that reflection "is the dialectical process by which we develop and achieve, first, specific goals for learning; second, strategies for reaching those goals; and third, means of determining whether or not we have met those goals or other goals."

The concepts of reflection and reflective writing are social constructs prevalent in academic literature, and in different contexts, their meanings have different interpretations.

== Characteristics of reflective writing ==
The main characteristics of reflective writing include:

1. Reflection: The writer reflects on the issue (that is, the topic they are writing about) and considers how their own experience and points of view might influence their response. This helps the writer learn about themselves as well as contribute to a better final product that considers biases.
2. Evidence: The writer considers and cites different perspectives and evidence to provide a truly comprehensive reflection. "Evidence" can mean either academic evidence or the writer's own reflections and experiences, depending on whether the piece of reflection is personal or academic.
3. Clarity: The writer must be clear and cohesive. As reflective writing takes the reader through both the writer's own thoughts and sometimes other outside perspectives, unity and readability are crucial to ensure the reader does not get lost between points of view.

If the reflection is written for academia—that is, it is not a personal reflection or journal—additional features include:

1. Theory: An academic reflection will integrate theories and other academic works to explain the reflection. For example, a writer might say: "Smith's theory of social engagement might explain why I reacted the way I did."
2. Learning outcomes: An academic reflection will include commentary on how the writer learned from the experience, what they would have done differently, or how their perspectives or opinions have changed as a result of the experience.

== Reflective writing in academia ==
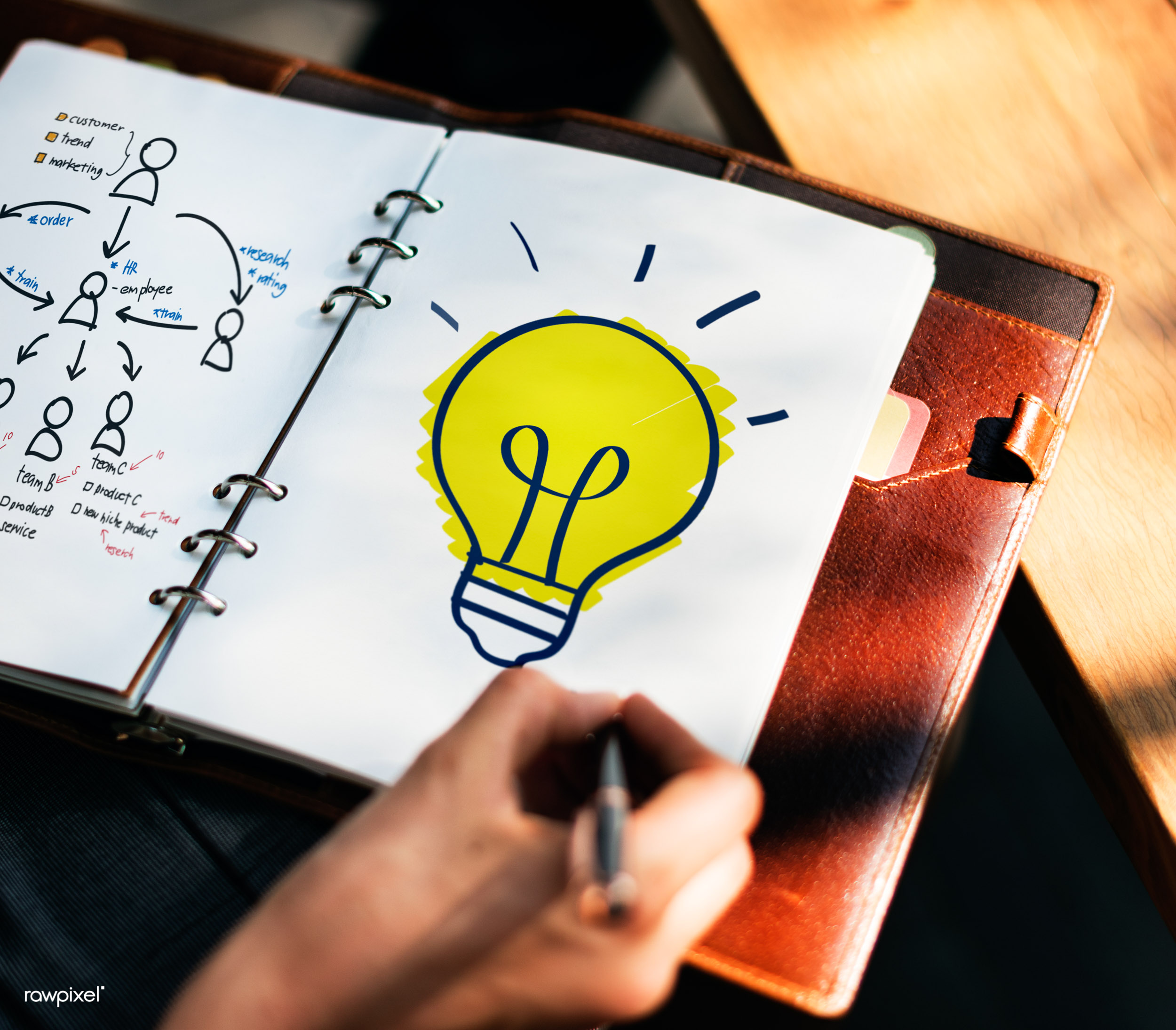
Reflective writing helps students to develop a better understanding of their goals.

Reflective writing is regularly used in academic settings, as it helps students think about how they think and allows students to think beyond the scope of the literal meaning of their writing or thinking. In other words, it is a form of metacognition. Proper reflective writing is heavily influenced by metacognition. Metacognition allows for better self-reflection and allows the writer to take the material beyond the literal meaning.

Metacognition is broken down into two parts; metacognitive knowledge and metacognitive regulation. In academia, metacognitive knowledge is specified by three categories including declarative, procedural, and conditional knowledge. Declarative knowledge is a person's self awareness and ability to recognize one's own strengths and weaknesses. Procedural knowledge defines the ability to execute a learning strategy. It is developed through experience and used to apply declarative knowledge. Conditional knowledge is knowing which skills to use under different circumstances and is defined by its relationship to the other two kinds of knowledge. It is the combination of applying the strategies one accumulates to the appropriate contexts.

Reflective writing can be seen as a metacognitive genre that heavily influences literacy narrative assignments due to the increased reflective thinking it applies to students. Students can consciously and unconsciously analyze their experiences and interactions through this assessment tool. It is frequently assigned to postsecondary students and is particularly useful to students and practitioners in composition, education, and health-related fields as it helps them reflect on their practice. Typical academic reflective writings include portfolios, summaries, and journals. Reflective writing is not limited to academic writing because it often takes many different forms. Sometimes it is used in stand-alone assessment tasks, and other times it is incorporated into other tasks such as essays.

Reflective writing in education systems aids in adapting students' "knowledge in waiting" into "knowledge in practice" which encourages students to analyze previous professional experiences when applying these to future situations. This type of analytical skill is advantageous for students pursuing professions that have recurring unpredictable situations and allows students to be better prepared for the workplace.

Evidence shows that reflective writing is a good way to increase empathy in medical students. Another study showed that students who were assigned reflective writing during a camp developed greater self-awareness, had a better understanding of their goals, and were better able to recognize their personal development.

It is also found that students who partake in critical reflective assignments use it as a way to let out their pent-up emotions, making critical reflection a way to seek cathartic relief.

Reflective writing is useful to improve collaboration, as it makes writers aware of how they sound when they voice their thoughts and opinions to others. Additionally, it is an important part of the reflective learning cycle, which includes planning, acting, observing, and reflecting.

Students can be hesitant to write reflectively as it requires them to not just consider but actively cite things they typically would hide or ignore in academic writing, like their anxieties and shortcomings.

Reflective writing in academic settings is sometimes criticized, as concerns exist regarding its effectiveness. Reflective writing assignments are often weighted low in a course's grade calculations, and among a crowded workload, students can see them as an afterthought. It has also been argued that reflective writing assignments are only assigned as "busy work", as they are low maintenance and relatively easy to grade. Additionally, because students know they will be graded on their reflection, it might be written in an inauthentic way.

Reflective writing shifts the focus from the final product to the learning process. This encourages students to evaluate their writing and consider how different audiences might engage with their work, as well as learning more about their writing styles along the way. Engaging in reflective writing helps students develop metacognitive skills, enabling them to monitor their learning, evaluate their thought processes, and adjust their understanding accordingly.

Reflective writing facilitates a deeper understanding of students' awareness of their writing processes and serves as a valuable tool for studying this knowledge across diverse student populations. It also encourages students to analyze their learning experiences and think about the reasoning behind their choices in various projects. Designing reflective writing tasks that encourage students to use their learning as a collaborative classroom activity can enhance their meta-awareness and show the role of collaboration in their educational thinking. Integration of reflective writing must be shown in the classroom and the student's curriculum to ensure they address student learning as well as classroom objectives.

Nonetheless, reflective writing is becoming increasingly important in education, as reflecting on completed work helps students see room for improvement.

== Benefits of reflective writing ==
There are many benefits to reflective writing. A few are: increased self-awareness about personal writing techniques; improved critical analysis; and ability to examine and understand social, cultural, and political issues that involve language.

Within professions, reflective writing can be used as a therapeutic form of expression, especially useful in stress-filled professions. For example, therapeutic journalism blends writing with healing, helping individuals explore emotions and improve mental health.

Writing reflectively is an important aspect of nursing education, as it enhances clinical reasoning, promotes personal growth in the profession, and helps overcome obstacles to learning. It has been found to improve student's ability to remain mindful in clinical situations; however the depth of reflection may be surface level. Reflective writing serves as a mechanism for both professional growth and personal development. For implementation facilitators in health settings, reflective writing has also been shown to improve critical thinking, adaptability, and the ability to apply lessons to future challenges.

Reflective thinking helps individuals make sense of their learning by analyzing past experiences and using those insights to create meaningful personal and intellectual growth. It fosters high order thinking by enabling students to evaluate their experiences, and using their conclusions drawn from that to support their conclusions with insights from their learning process. It plays a key role in helping students evaluate their writing practices. However, many students require structured opportunities, demonstrations, and feedback to develop effective reflective thinking and metacognitive skills. Audio responses to student writing can help move beyond basic corrective feedback by encouraging more meaningful reflection and self-revision. Within a classroom setting, the addition of reflective writing assignments can help improve intellectual thinking by introducing assignments that encourage a deeper relationship between the individual and their writing. Using reflective assignments in classroom settings further aids in student retention of information being discussed in the classroom.

Within a classroom setting, the addition of reflective writing assignments can help improve intellectual thinking by introducing assignments that encourage a deeper relationship between the individual and their writing. The introduction of reflective assignments in classroom settings further aids in student retention of information being discussed in the classroom.

Additionally, when teachers cultivate a reflective environment around writing, students develop transferable writing skills known as constructive metacognition. Constructive metacognition is a type of reflection done across different writing contexts to develop a writer's identity. It is developed by using reflective techniques to understand writing choices and apply them to new contexts. Being able to apply writing choices in new contexts is known as transferable writing. One of the most valuable tools for this process is sharing rhetorical knowledge in collaborative spaces. When given the opportunity to both receive feedback and have an open conversation about it, students gain a deeper understanding of their writing process and can approach new contexts with a strong writerly identity.

Once a writer recognizes all their skills, strategies, and experiences through reflective writing, they gain access to integrated knowledge, a term combining metacognitive ability and the reflective process and a tool which can be utilized for any writing context.

Writing provides a safe space for expressing difficult emotions or memories, making it easier to process complex feelings. It can enhance self-awareness, helping people understand themselves better. Therapeutic writing can uncover unconscious thoughts and beliefs, providing insight into personal challenges or emotional barriers. Reflective writing, in particular, provides a way to process these emotions by encouraging individuals to examine and reframe their experiences, leading to greater emotional insight and healing. It is frequently combined with other therapeutic approaches, like narrative therapy, to support the healing process. Reflective journaling has been linked to improved emotional regulation, stronger metacognitive skills, and enhanced student self-awareness. Classrooms can be a transformative space for healing and processing emotional pain, and reflective wiring can become big part of the process. The academy's intellectual goals can align with the emotional and empathetic processes necessary for trauma recovery. Writing can be use as a tool for self-expression and emotional release in the classroom. In social work education, reflective writing has been shown to help students develop empathy, better understand others' experiences, and build emotional resilience. Students are encouraged to engage in writing, using an unfiltered form of expression that connects them to their inner emotions and personal experiences. As they share their stories and read others, they develop a sense of empathy for one another. Students affected by trauma may struggle with emotional regulation, making it harder for them to express themselves or engage fully in academic settings. In a trauma-informed writing pedagogy, collaboration with counselors or mental health professionals can provide additional support for students who need it. Educators may refer students to resources or integrate mental health awareness into their teaching practices, ensuring that students are receiving appropriate care.

A guide for this process might include:

1. Self-reflection exercises to explore emotions and behaviors.
2. Journaling prompts designed for self-exploration.
3. Writing rituals that enhance emotional awareness.
4. Exploring life challenges through structured writing.
5. Mindfulness techniques integrated into writing practices.
6. Positive affirmations and goal-setting through writing.

Best practices for reflective writing include creating emotionally safe environments, accepting uncertainty, and encouraging openness to emotional expression as a part of learning.

== See also ==
- Narration
- Storytelling
- Writing therapy
