= Dionys Fitzherbert =

English spiritual life writer (c.1580–1640)

Dionys Fitzherbert (c.1580–1640) was an English spiritual life writer, known for her autobiographical work An Anatomie for the Poore in Spirit. Or the Case of an Afflicted Conscience layed open by Example.

== Biography ==
Fitzherbert was born around 1580 to a minor gentry family. She was one of the eight sons and three daughters born to Humphrey Fitzherbert and Ursula Fitzherbert (née Waring). Her father was a landowner in Begbroke, Oxfordshire and she was raised a Protestant. In her late teenager years, Fitzherbert refused a proposal of marriage, so was sent to serve in the households of local noblewomen. She received some education in the household of Katherine Hastings, Countess of Huntingdon.

Around 1608–1610, Fitzherbert wrote a manuscript account to record a six month period of psychological disturbances; religious turmoil, crisis and despair; and a celestial vision. This was titled An Anatomie for the Poore in Spirit. Or the Case of an Afflicted Conscience layed open by Example. Fitzherbert interpreted her experiences as a "spiritual battle for her soul", due to the "lamentable calamities" of the English Church and in punishment for her sins. She was placed in the care of a doctor in Holborn, but wrote that her recovery was due to reading devotional literature, such as John Freeman’s The Comforter (1600), and the Holy Bible, and resisting temptation to convert to Catholicism. Fitzherbert was "at odds with the interpretation of those around her", as her friends and family thought, that her state of distraction, delusions and eccentric behaviour were actually insanity or melancholia.

Fitzherbert's work is considered an early example of spiritual autobiography, which became a widespread genre by the end of the 1600s. As Fitzherbert controlled her narrative and refused to acknowledge her mental illness in her life writing, she exercised authority in deciding what to reveal about herself in her work. In 1633, Fitzherbert gave copies of her manuscript to Sion College in London and the Bodleian Library of the University of Oxford. She also wrote another copy of the work with detailed instructions for its intended circulation as a public text. Fitzherbert's later life was devoted to participation in religious life and she died in London.
