= Carl Leggo =

Canadian autobiographical poet and scholar (1953–2019)

- Born: 1953; Corner Brook, Newfoundland, Canada
- Died: March 7, 2019 (aged 65–66)
- Spouse: Lana Verge
- Children: 2

Academic background
- Education: Memorial University of Newfoundland (BA, BEd); University of New Brunswick (MA); University of Alberta (PhD)

Academic work
- Sub-discipline: Life writing, narrative inquiry, poetic inquiry, creative writing, contemplative practices, and arts-based research
- Institutions: University of British Columbia

Carleton Derek Leggo (1953 - March 7, 2019) was a Canadian autobiographical poet and scholar.

== Personal life and education ==
Leggo was born in Corner Brook, Newfoundland to Russell and Kerry Leggo.

He received a Bachelor of Arts and Bachelor of Education from Memorial University of Newfoundland, a certificate in Biblical studies from Tyndale Seminary, a Master of Arts and Master of Education from University of New Brunswick, and a Doctor of Philosophy from University of Alberta.

Leggo was married to Lana Verge, and they had two children, Anna and Aaron.

== Career ==
During the 1980s, Leggo worked as a teacher in Newfoundland for nine years before accepting a faculty position at the University of British Columbia(UBC). Leggo taught in the Department of Language and Literacy Education from 1990 to 2019. Throughout his time at UBC, Leggo received various awards, including the Killam Teaching Award, Faculty of Education (1995), Sam Black Award for Excellence in Education and Development in the Visual and Performing Arts (2001), Killam Award for Excellence in Mentoring (2012), and Ted T. Aoki Award for Distinguished Service in Canadian Curriculum Studies (2013). His research interests focused on life writing, narrative inquiry, poetic inquiry, creative writing, contemplative practices, and arts-based research.

Leggo was a member of the Canadian Society for the Study of Education (CSSE) and was active in the Canadian Association for Curriculum Studies (CACS), Language and Literacy Researchers of Canada (LLRC), and the Arts Researchers and Teachers Society (ARTS).

Following Leggo's death, the University of British Columbia established the Carl Leggo Graduate Scholarship in Arts-Based Inquiry Fund in his honour.

== Books ==
=== As author ===
- Leggo, Carl (1994). Growing up Perpendicular on the Side of a Hill. St. John's: Killick Press. ISBN 978-1-895387-36-0.
- Leggo, Carl (1997). Teaching to Wonder: Responding to Poetry in the Secondary Classroom. Pacific Educational Press. ISBN 978-1-895-76631-8.
- Leggo, Carleton Derek (1999). View from My Mother's House. St. John's, Nfld: Killick Press. ISBN 978-1-894294-06-5.
- Leggo, Carl (2006). Come-by-Chance: A Collection of Poems. Breakwater Books Ltd. ISBN 978-1-550-81082-0.
- Hasebe-Ludt, Erika; Chambers, Cynthia; Leggo, Carleton Derek (2009). Life Writing and Literary Métissage as an Ethos for Our Times. New York: Peter Lang. ISBN 978-1-4331-0306-3.
- Cohen, Avraham; Porath, Marion; Clarke, Anthony; Bai, Heesoon; Leggo, Carl; Meyer, Karen (2012). Speaking of Teaching: Inclinations, Inspirations, and Innerworkings. Rotterdam Boston: Sense Publishers. ISBN 978-94-6091-787-5.
- Leggo, Carl (2012). Sailing in a Concrete Boat: Retrospective and Prospective. Social fictions series. Rotterdam: SensePublishers Imprint: SensePublishers. ISBN 978-94-6091-955-8.
- Leggo, Carl; Holmes, Kimberley (2020). The Spaces in Between: A Poetic Duo-ethnographical Exploration. Dio Press Inc. ISBN 978-1645040477.

=== As editor ===
- Springgay, Stephanie; Irwin, Rita L.; Leggo, Carl; Gouzouasis, Peter, eds. (2009). Being with A/r/tography. Rotterdam: Sense Publishers. ISBN 978-90-8790-262-9.
- Kelly, Robert W.; Leggo, Carleton Derek, eds. (2008). Creative Expression, Creative Education: Creativity as a Primary Rationale for Education. Calgary: Detselig Enterprises. ISBN 978-1-55059-359-4. OCLC 227508756.
- Prendergast, Monica; Leggo, Carl; Sameshima, Pauline, eds. (2009). Poetic Inquiry: Vibrant Voices in the Social Sciences. Boston: Brill. ISBN 9789087909512.
- Chambers, Cynthia; Hasebe-Ludt, Erika; Leggo, Carl; Sinner, Anita, eds. (2012). A Heart of Wisdom: Life Writing as Empathetic Inquiry. Peter Lang Inc. ISBN 978-1-433-11529-5.
- James, Kedrick; Dobson, Teresa M.; Leggo, Carl, eds. (2012). English in Middle and Secondary Classrooms. Pearson Canada. ISBN 978-0-132-98113-2.
- Fels, Lynn; Leggo, Carleton Derek; Martin, Ruth Elwood; Korchinski, Mo, eds. (2014). Arresting hope: women taking action in prison health inside out. Toronto: Inanna Publications and Education Inc. ISBN 978-1-77133-158-6. OCLC 890512048.
- Walsh, Susan; Bickel, Barbara; Leggo, Carol, eds. (2014). Arts-based and Contemplative Practices in Research and Teaching: Honoring Presence. Routledge. ISBN 978-0-415-74387-7.
- Hasebe-Ludt, Erika; Leggo, Carl, eds. (2018). Canadian Curriculum Studies: A Métissage of Inspiration / Imagination / Interconnection. Canadian Scholars. ISBN 9781773380551.
- Sameshima, Pauline; Fidyk, Alexandra; James, Kedrick; Leggo, Carl, eds. (2018). Poetic Inquiry: Enchantment of Place. Vernon Press. ISBN 978-1-622-73122-0.
- Irwin, Rita L.; Hasebe-Ludt, Erika; Sinner, Anita, eds. (2019). Storying the World the Contributions of Carl Leggo on Language and Poetry. Routledge. ISBN 9780429025600.
