= Sidney Jourard =

Canadian psychologist, professor and author (1926–1974)

Sidney Marshall Jourard
- Born: 1926; Toronto, Ontario, Canada
- Died: 1974 (aged 47–48); Gainesville
- Education: University of Toronto; University of Buffalo
- Scientific career
- Fields: Psychology; Humanistic psychology
- Workplaces: Emory University; University of Alabama; University of Florida
- Thesis: A study of ego strength by means of the Rorschach test and the interruption of tasks experiment (1952)

Sidney Marshall Jourard (1926–1974) was a Canadian psychologist, professor, and writer. He was best known as the author of the books The Transparent Self and Healthy Personality: An Approach From the Viewpoint of Humanistic Psychology, which was a synthesis of the concepts and techniques that humanistic psychologists utilized and built upon in the 1960s and 1970s. Jourard is also known for his "Self-Disclosure Theory" of humanistic therapy. He has written many other works, including essays, books, and lectures on growth as a human being.

== Life and career ==
Sidney Marshall Jourard was born in 1926 in Mount Dennis, a neighbourhood of Toronto, Ontario, Canada. He was the son of Albert Louis Jourard and Anna Rubinoff Jourard, both Russian immigrants. He graduated from the University of Toronto in 1947 and received a master's degree in 1949. He began teaching at the University of Buffalo where he received his PhD in psychology. Jourard moved to Atlanta, Georgia and taught at Emory University, then moved to Birmingham, Alabama, where he taught at the University of Alabama.

In 1958, he was invited to work with the J. Hillis Miller Health Science Center at the University of Florida in Gainesville, working with the School of Nursing. He joined the Psychology Department in 1959, where he lectured and taught large sections of Introductory Psychology. He also had a private practice up until his death on December 2, 1974. Jourard was working on his small sports car in his garage at his home when the jack slipped and brought about his accidental death.

== Self-Disclosure Theory ==
Jourard's "Self-Disclosure Theory" is a therapeutic model of humanistic treatment where total disclosure is encouraged between the client and the therapist. The therapist would also disclose himself to the client in reciprocation, however, the therapist, being a psychologist, would rely on training and the concepts of psychological theories to relate to the client. According to Jourard, disclosure is important in any relationship, as it fosters openness, healthy relationships, and an enthusiasm to grow within the personal and social sphere.

== See also ==
- Self-concealment
