= Personal development planning =

Personal development planning is the process of creating an action plan for current and future based on awareness, values, reflection, goal-setting and investment in personal development within the context of a career, education, relationship, and self-improvement.

== Overview ==
Personal development planning is based on the input that the person gets from the various psychosocioeconomic interactions and triggered responses. The environment that this happens in and the quality of experiences that the person gets significantly affect the person's nature of planning, and it creates a base for their worldview.

=== Professional ===
The PDP (personal development plan) or an IDP (individual development plan) is a form of personal development planning done through pen and paper. They are commonly tentative, as they are not critical in nature, mostly unguided and ill-informed, and sometimes simply an exercise to visualise or project their future. It usually includes a statement of one's aspirations, strengths or competencies, education and training, and stages or steps to indicate how the plan is to be realized. Personal development plans may also include a statement of one's career and lifestyle priorities, where they like to see themselves at a point of time, analysis of opportunities and risks, an expected portfolio of skills required for the career and how the person intends to earn them over a particular frame of time, alternative plans (Plan B), and a curriculum vitae (CV).

Human-resource management uses PDPs. Employees who participate in employee training are often asked to complete a personal development plan. An individual would be asked to develop a five-year personal development plan to organize personal goals and to make them achievable within a certain time-period.
