= Annals of Behavioral Medicine =

- Discipline: Behavioral medicine, health psychology
- Language: English
- Edited by: Tracey A. Revenson

Publication details
- History: 1979-present
- Publisher: Oxford University Press on behalf of the Society of Behavioral Medicine
- Frequency: Monthly
- Impact factor: 4.908 (2020)

Standard abbreviations
- ISO 4: Ann. Behav. Med.

Indexing
- CODEN: ABMEEH
- ISSN: 0883-6612 (print); 1532-4796 (web)
- LCCN: 86642204
- OCLC no.: 12181616

Links
- Journal homepage

Annals of Behavioral Medicine is a monthly peer-reviewed medical journal published by Oxford University Press on behalf of the Society of Behavioral Medicine. It publishes original research on behavioral medicine and the integration of biological, psychosocial, and behavioral factors and principles. The editor-in-chief is Tracey Revenson (City University of New York).

It is the flagship journal of the Society of Behavioral Medicine and was established in 1979.

== Abstracting and indexing ==
The journal is abstracted and indexed in:

- MEDLINE/PubMed
- Social Sciences Citation Index
- Scopus
- PsycINFO
- EMBASE
- BIOSIS Previews
- Current Contents/Social & Behavioral Sciences
- EMCare

According to the Journal Citation Reports, the journal has a 2020 impact factor of 4.908.
