= James W. Pennebaker =

U.S. psychology professor and language analyst

James Whiting Pennebaker
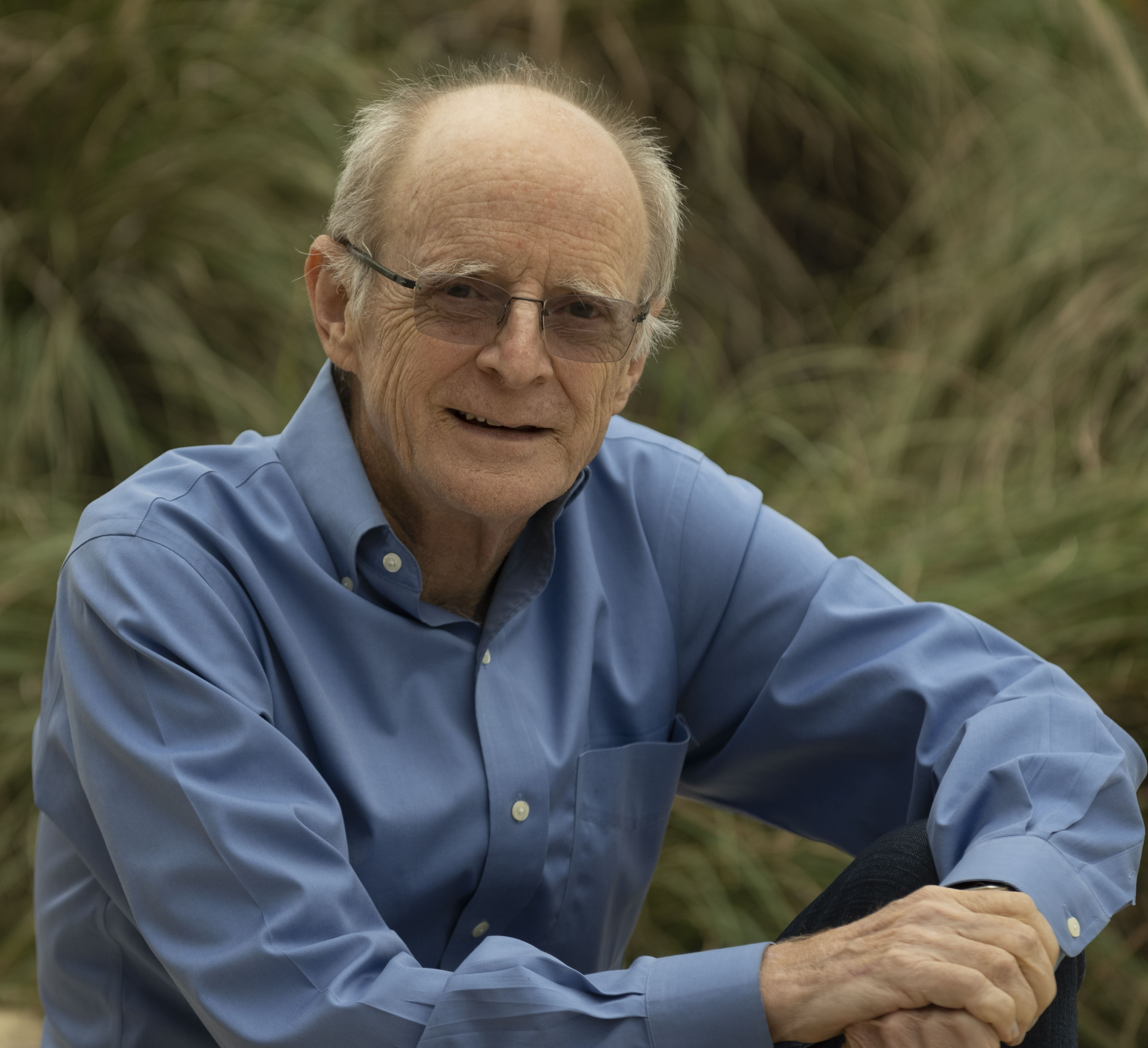
- Born: March 2, 1950 (age 76); Midland, Texas, U.S.
- Occupations: Regents Centennial Professor of Psychology at the University of Texas at Austin and Co-founder of Receptiviti
- Known for: Social psychology Writing therapy Anthropological linguistics Psycholinguistics; Sociolinguistics physical symptoms

James Whiting Pennebaker (born March 2, 1950) is an American social psychologist. He is a Professor Emeritus of Psychology at the University of Texas at Austin and a member of the Academy of Distinguished Teachers. His research focuses on the relationship between natural language use, health, and social behavior, most recently "how everyday language reflects basic social and personality processes".

Pennebaker is widely recognized for his discovery of the effects of expressive writing and for developing computational methods to analyze natural language as a marker of psychological states. He was elected a Member of the National Academy of Sciences in 2025 for his contributions to psychology, psycholinguistics, and the study of language and health.

== Education and career ==
Pennebaker received his B.A. in psychology from Eckerd College in 1972 with honors and his Ph.D. from the University of Texas at Austin in 1977.

He has held the following positions:

- 1977–1983: Assistant Professor of Psychology, Department of Psychology, University of Virginia.
- 1983–1997: Associate and Full Professor, Southern Methodist University; 1995–1997: Chair of Psychology Department.
- 1997–present: Professor of Psychology, University of Texas at Austin.
- 2005–2009: Bush Regents Professor of Liberal Arts and Barbara Bush Professor of Psychology.
- 2009–2023: Regents Centennial Professor of Liberal Arts.
- 2023–present: Emeritus Professor of Psychology.
- 2005–2014: Chair of Psychology Department.
- 2005–2010: International Research Professor, University of Central Lancashire, Preston, England.
- 2016–2018: Executive Director, Project 2021 to rethink undergraduate education University of Texas at Austin.

In addition to his academic appointments, Pennebaker has held leadership roles in university-wide initiatives, including serving as Executive Director of Project 2021 (2016–2018), an effort to redesign undergraduate education at the University of Texas at Austin.

== Research ==
Over the course of his career, Pennebaker has studied the nature of physical symptoms, health consequences of secrets, expressive writing, and natural language, and has received grants from the National Science Foundation, the National Institutes of Health, the Templeton Foundation, the U.S. Army Research Institute, and other federal agencies for studies in language, emotion, and social dynamics.

=== Expressive writing and health ===
A pioneer of writing therapy, he has researched the link between language and recovering from trauma and been "recognized by the American Psychological Association as one of the top researchers on trauma, disclosure, and health."

His experimental work demonstrated that structured writing about emotional experiences can lead to improvements in immune function, reduced health care use, and enhanced psychological well-being, helping to establish expressive writing as a widely used intervention in both clinical and non-clinical settings.

=== Language, personality, and social behavior ===
In particular, he finds a person's use of "low-level words", such as pronouns and articles, predictive of recovery as well as indicative of sex, age, and personality traits: "Virtually no one in psychology has realized that low-level words can give clues to large-scale behaviors."

His research showed that these function words can reliably signal psychological states, social status, and interpersonal dynamics. This work has influenced research in personality psychology, communication, political psychology and computational linguistics.

== Linguistic Inquiry and Word Count (LIWC) ==
In the early-1990s, he and colleagues developed the Linguistic Inquiry and Word Count (LIWC; pronounced "Luke"), a computerized text analysis program that outputs the percentage of words in a given text that fall into one or more of over 80 linguistic (e.g., first-person singular pronouns, conjunctions), psychological (e.g., anger, achievement), and topical (e.g., leisure, money) categories.

LIWC represented a major methodological innovation by enabling large-scale, automated, and objective analysis of language, replacing earlier hand-coding approaches. It has since become one of the most widely used tools for psychological text analysis in the social and computer sciences.

LIWC has been applied in domains including political communication, mental health assessment, organizational behavior, deception detection, and large-scale analysis of digital communication such as social media.

Later versions of LIWC expanded its dictionaries and analytical capabilities and have been integrated into research involving artificial intelligence and natural language processing, contributing to the development of computational social science.

== Receptiviti ==
Pennebaker is a co-founder of Receptiviti, a Toronto-based technology company that applies psycholinguistic analysis to real-world language data. The company builds on methods developed through LIWC to generate insights into personality, emotion, and social behavior.

Receptiviti's platform is used in areas such as business intelligence, marketing, healthcare, and security, representing a translation of academic research into applied technology and commercial practice.

== Recent research and artificial intelligence ==
Pennebaker's work has increasingly intersected with developments in artificial intelligence and large language models. His articles examine how large language models can be used to study psychological processes and human behavior.

The research highlights both the opportunities and limitations of AI in psychological research, including its potential for large-scale behavioral analysis as well as challenges related to bias, interpretation, and ethics. This work connects his earlier contributions in language analysis to contemporary developments in computational psychology and artificial intelligence.

== Awards and honours ==
Pennebaker has received numerous honors in recognition of his contributions to psychology and interdisciplinary research. In addition to his election to the National Academy of Sciences (2025) and the American Academy of Arts and Sciences (2023), he has received major career awards from leading scientific organizations.

These include honors from the American Psychological Association and the Association for Psychological Science for contributions to health psychology, social and personality psychology, and the application of psychological science. His work has been widely cited, and he is regarded as a leading figure in the study of language, emotion, and health.

== Selected publications ==
=== Books ===
- The Psychology of Physical Symptoms. New York: Springer, 1982. ISBN 978-0-387-90730-7
- (Ed., with Daniel M. Wegner) Handbook of Mental Control. Englewood Cliffs, New Jersey: Prentice Hall, 1993. ISBN 978-0-13-379280-5
- Emotion, Disclosure, and Health. Washington, D.C.: American Psychological Association, 1995. ISBN 978-1-55798-308-4
- Opening up: The Healing Power of Confiding in Others. New York: Morrow, 1990. Repr. Opening Up: The Healing Power of Expressing Emotions. New York: Guilford, 1997. ISBN 978-1-57230-238-9
- Writing to Heal: A Guided Journal for Recovering from Trauma and Emotional Upheaval. Oakland, California: New Harbinger, 2004. ISBN 978-1-57224-365-1
- The Secret Life of Pronouns: What Our Words Say About Us. New York: Bloomsbury Publishing, 2011. ISBN 978-1-60819-480-3

=== Edited and co-authored books ===
- Expressive Writing: Words that Heal. Idyll Arbor, 2014. James Pennebaker; John Evans. ISBN 9781611580464
- Opening Up by Writing It Down, Third Edition: How Expressive Writing Improves Health and Eases Emotional Pain. Guilford Press, 2014. James Pennebaker, Joshua M. Smyth. ISBN 978-1462524921
- Emotion, Disclosure, and Health. Washington, D.C.: American Psychological Association, 1995. James Pennebaker (Ed).doi:10.1037/10182-000
- Collective Memories of Political Events: Social Psychological Perspectives. Erlbaum, 1997. James Pennebaker, Dario Paez, Bernard Rimé (Eds).ISBN 978-0805821826

=== Articles ===
- with Sandra Klihr Beall (1986). "Confronting a traumatic event: Toward an understanding of inhibition and disease" (PDF). Journal of Abnormal Psychology. 95 (3): 274–281. doi:10.1037/0021-843x.95.3.274. PMID 3745650. Archived from the original (PDF) on 2016-03-04.
- with Janice K. Kiecolt-Glaser; Ronald Glaser (1988). "Disclosure of traumas and immune function: health implications for psychotherapy" (PDF). Journal of Consulting and Clinical Psychology. 56 (2): 239–245. doi:10.1037/0022-006x.56.2.239. PMID 3372832. Archived from the original (PDF) on 2016-03-04.
- Pennebaker, James W. (1989). "Confession, Inhibition, and Disease". Advances in Experimental Social Psychology Volume 22. Vol. 22. Academic Press. pp. 211–244. doi:10.1016/S0065-2601(08)60309-3. ISBN 978-0-12-015222-3.
- with David Watson (April 1989). "Health complaints, stress, and distress: exploring the central role of negative affectivity" (PDF). Psychological Review. 96 (2): 234–254. doi:10.1037/0033-295X.96.2.234. PMID 2710874. Archived from the original (PDF) on 2012-09-05.
- Pennebaker, James W. (July 1993). "Putting stress into words: Health, linguistic, and therapeutic implications". Behaviour Research and Therapy. 31 (6): 539–548. doi:10.1016/0005-7967(93)90105-4. PMID 8347112.
- Pennebaker, James W. (May 1997). "Writing About Emotional Experiences as a Therapeutic Process" (PDF). Psychological Science. 8 (3): 162–166. doi:10.1111/j.1467-9280.1997.tb00403.x. S2CID 15516728. Archived from the original (PDF) on 2011-11-12.
- with Janel D. Seagal (1999). "Forming a story: The health benefits of narrative" (PDF). Journal of Clinical Psychology. 55 (10): 1243–1254. doi:10.1002/(SICI)1097-4679(199910)55:10<1243::AID-JCLP6>3.0.CO;2-N. PMID 11045774. Archived from the original (PDF) on 2012-05-05.
- with Jennifer K. Bosson; William B. Swann, Jr. (2000). "Stalking the perfect measure of implicit self-esteem: The blind men and the elephant revisited?" (PDF). Journal of Personality and Social Psychology. 79 (4): 631–643. doi:10.1037/0022-3514.79.4.631. PMID 11045743.
- with Ewa Kacewicz; Matthew Davis; Moongee Jeon; Arthur C. Graesser (2014). "Pronoun use reflects standings in social hierarchies". Journal of Language and Social Psychology. 33 (2): 125–143. doi:10.1177/0261927X14526856 (inactive 9 October 2026).
- with Cindy K. Chung; Joey Frazee; Gary M. Lavergne; David I. Beaver (2014). "When small words foretell academic success: The case of college admissions essays". PLOS ONE. 9 (12) e115844. Bibcode:2014PLoSO...9k5844P. doi:10.1371/journal.pone.0115844. PMC 4281205. PMID 25551217.
- with Ryan L. Boyd; Kate G. Blackburn (2020). "The narrative arc: Revealing core narrative structures through text analysis". Science Advances. 6 (32) eaba2196. doi:10.1126/sciadv.aba2196. PMC 7413736. PMID 32821822.
- with Dorottya Demszky; Diyi Yang; David S. Yeager; Christopher J. Bryan; Margarett Clapper; Susannah Chandhok; Johannes C. Eichstaedt; Cameron Hecht; Jeremy Jamieson; Meghann Johnson; Michaela Jones; Danielle Krettek-Cobb; Leslie Lai; Nirel JonesMitchell; Desmond C. Ong; Carol S. Dweck; James J. Gross; James W. Pennebaker (2023). "Using large language models in psychology" (PDF). Nature Reviews Psychology. 2: 688–701. doi:10.1038/s44159-023-00241-5.
- Seraj, S., Blackburn, K.G., & Pennebaker, J.W. (2021). Language left behind on social media exposes the emotional and cognitive costs of a romantic breakup. Proceedings of the National Academy of Science, February 16, 2021,118 (7) e2017154118; doi:10.1073/pnas.2017154118

== See also ==
- Self-concealment
- Self-disclosure
