= International Journal of Behavioral Medicine =

- Discipline: Behavioral medicine
- Language: English
- Edited by: Michael A. Hoyt; Tracey A. Revenson

Publication details
- History: 1994-present
- Publisher: Springer Science+Business Media
- Frequency: Quarterly
- Impact factor: 2.012 (2017)

Standard abbreviations
- ISO 4: Int. J. Behav. Med.

Indexing
- ISSN: 1070-5503 (print); 1532-7558 (web)
- OCLC no.: 644154431

Links
- Journal homepage; Online access

The International Journal of Behavioral Medicine is a quarterly peer-reviewed medical journal covering behavioral medicine. It was established in 1994 and is published by Springer Science+Business Media on behalf of the International Society of Behavioral Medicine, of which it is the official journal. The editors-in-chief is Michael A. Hoyt. According to the Journal Citation Reports, the journal has a 2017 impact factor of 2.012.
