= Self-concealment =

Predisposition to hide embarrassing information

Self-concealment is a psychological construct defined as "a predisposition to actively conceal from others personal information that one perceives as distressing or negative". Its opposite is self-disclosure.

The concealed personal information (thoughts, feelings, actions, or events) is highly intimate, negative in valence and has three characteristics: it is a subset of private information, can be consciously accessed, and is actively concealed from others. Self-concealment significantly contributes to negative psychological health.

== Historical context ==
Secrets and secret keeping have been a longstanding interest of psychologists and psychotherapists. Jourard's work on self-disclosure and Pennebaker's research on the health benefits of disclosing traumatic events and secrets set the stage for the conceptualization and measurement of self-concealment.

Jourard's research pointed to the conclusion that stress and illness result not only from low self-disclosure, but more so from the intentional avoidance of being known by another person. In a later line of research, Pennebaker and his colleagues examined the confiding-illness relation or the inhibition-disease link and found that not expressing thoughts and feelings about traumatic events is associated with long-term health effects. Pennebaker attributed the unwillingness to disclose distressing personal information to either circumstances or individual differences. The self-concealment construct, and the scale for its measurement, the Self-Concealment Scale, were introduced to permit assessment and conceptualization of individual differences on this personality dimension.

== Psychological effects ==
Self-concealment uniquely and significantly contributes to the prediction of anxiety, depression, and physical symptoms. Subsequent research has examined the effects of self-concealment on subjective well-being and coping, finding that high self-concealment is associated with psychological distress and self-reported physical symptoms, anxiety and depression, shyness, negative self-esteem, loneliness, rumination, trait social anxiety, social anxiety, and self-silencing, ambivalence over emotional expressiveness, maladaptive mood regulation, and acute and chronic pain.

Individuals with increased inferiority feelings have a higher tendency toward self-concealment, which in turn results in an increase in loneliness and a decrease in happiness.

== Research ==
Theoretical models offered to explain the consistent finding of negative health effects for self-concealment include:

- An inhibition model developed by Pennebaker, which would attribute these effects to the physiological work that is a consequence of the behavioral inhibition accompanying the self-concealment process.
- A preoccupation model based on the work of Wegner that sees the thought suppression associated with self-concealment as ironically leading to intrusive thoughts and even greater preoccupation with distressing personal information, which in turn leads to poor well-being.
- Self-perception theory, which argues that behavior influences attitudes—the self-concealing person observes his or her own concealing behavior and concludes that there must be a good reason for the behavior, leading to negative characterological self-attributions that fit with this conclusion (e.g. "I must be bad because I am concealing this aspect of myself").
- Self-determination theory, which explains the negative health effects of self-concealment as the consequence of the frustration of the individual's basic needs of autonomy, relatedness, and competence.

Kelly offers a comprehensive review of several explanatory models and the evidence supporting each of them, concluding that a genetic component shared by high self-concealers might make them both more prone to self-conceal and more vulnerable to physical and psychological problems.

Research studies have focused on the relation of self-concealment to attachment orientations, help seeking and attitudes toward counseling, desire for greater (physical) interpersonal distance, stigma, distress disclosure, lying behavior and authenticity, and psychotherapy process.

Research also focuses on self-concealment in specific populations: LGBT, multicultural, and adolescents, families, and romantic partners.

A recent review of 137 studies using the Self-Concealment Scale presented a working model for the antecedents of self-concealment and the mechanisms of action for its health effects. The authors conceptualize self-concealment as a "complex trait-like motivational construct where high levels of SC motivation energize a range of goal-directed behaviors (e.g., keeping secrets, behavioral avoidance, lying) and dysfunctional strategies for the regulation of emotions (e.g., expressive suppression) which serve to conceal negative or distressing personal information." These mechanisms are seen as then affecting health through direct and indirect pathways, and as being "energized by a conflict between urges to conceal, and reveal—a dual-motive conflict which eventually leads to adverse physiological effects and a breakdown of self-regulatory resources".

=== Self-Concealment Scale ===
The 10-item Self-Concealment Scale (SCS) measures the degree to which a person tends to conceal personal information perceived as negative or distressing. The SCS has proven to have excellent psychometric properties (internal consistency and test-retest reliability) and unidimensionality. Representative items include: "I have an important secret that I haven't shared with anyone", "There are lots of things about me that I keep to myself", "Some of my secrets have really tormented me", "When something bad happens to me, I tend to keep it to myself", and "My secrets are too embarrassing to share with others".

== In marginalized populations ==
Minority groups employ self-concealment to manage perceived stigma. For example, LGBT people (lesbian, gay, bisexual, trans) people, who are stigmatized (see coming out) for the characteristics inherent to their sexual identities or gender identity, employ self-concealment as a result.

Self-concealment is observed in African, Asian and Latin American international college students. For African Americans in particular their self-concealment correlates with the degree of their Afrocentric cultural values. Arab and Middle Eastern people have been documented employing the following identity negotiation strategies:

- Humorous Accounting: A stigmatized minority will employ humor as a way to establish common ground.
- Educational Accounting: A stigmatized minority will make an effort to educate the person questioning their stigmatized identity. This method is a common method used by Muslim women who wear hijabs in the study.
- Defiant Accounting: A stigmatized minority will challenge the person questioning their identity by confronting the right to interrogate a stigmatized identity.
- Cowering: A stigmatized minority will meet the demands of the person questioning their stigmatized identity due to real, or perceived fears of violence.

Self-concealment strategies can also present in those with sexual paraphilias. Research in the experiences of furries, a stigmatized group, found that they are more likely to self disclose if there is little difference in power between the furry and the individual with whom they are disclosing their identity to.

== See also ==
- Coping
- Impression management
- Personal boundaries
- Personality psychology
- Secrets and secrecy
- Social anxiety disorder § Psychological factors
