= Psychology of Religion and Spirituality =

- Discipline: Psychology of religion
- Language: English
- Edited by: Crystal L. Park

Publication details
- History: 2009-present
- Publisher: American Psychological Association (United States)
- Frequency: Quarterly
- Impact factor: 2.2 (2024)

Standard abbreviations
- ISO 4: Psychol. Relig. Spiritual.

Indexing
- ISSN: 1941-1022 (print); 1943-1562 (web)
- OCLC no.: 233180244

Links
- Journal homepage; Online access

Psychology of Religion and Spirituality is a quarterly peer-reviewed academic journal covering the psychology of religion and spirituality. It was established in 2009 and is published by the American Psychological Association.

== Abstracting and indexing ==
The journal is abstracted and indexed by Scopus, PsycINFO, Arts & Humanities Citation Index, ATLA Religion Database, Current Contents, and the Social Sciences Citation Index. According to the Journal Citation Reports, the journal has a 2024 impact factor of 2.2.
