= Reflective learning =

Reflective learning is a form of education in which the student reflects upon their learning experiences. A theory about reflective learning cites it as an intentional and complex process that recognizes the role of social context and experience. The goals of the process are the clarification and the creation of meaning in terms of self, which then lead to a changed conceptual perspective.

== Development ==
Reflective learning is a development of the concept of experiential learning as propounded by John Dewey, who wrote Experience and Education in 1938. Later theorists include David Kolb, David Boud ("reflection in learning"), and Donald Schön. In a professional context, this is known as reflective practice, wherein the use of the reflective process allows a practitioner to understand their experiences differently and take action accordingly.
