= Intensive journal method =

Psychotherapeutic technique

The intensive journal method is a psychotherapeutic technique largely developed in 1966 at Drew University and popularized by Ira Progoff (1921–1998). It consists of a series of writing exercises using loose leaf notebook paper in a simple ring binder, divided into sections to help in accessing various areas of the writer's life. These include a dialogue section for the personification of things, a "depth dimension" to aid in accessing the subconscious and other places for recording remembrances and meditations.

The original Intensive Journal contained only 16 sections, but was later expanded to include five additional sections as part of Progoff's "process meditation" method. It has been the inspiration for many other "writing therapies" since then and is used in a variety of settings, including hospitals and prisons, by individuals as an aid to creativity or autobiography, and often as an adjunct to treatment in analytic, humanistic or cognitive therapy.

The intensive journal method is a registered trademark of Progoff and used under license by Dialogue House Associates, Inc of New York, who train facilitators and consultants in the use of the method and coordinate an ongoing series of public workshops using the method throughout the United States and elsewhere.

== Books ==
- At a Journal Workshop by Ira Progoff, 1975.
- The Practice of Process Meditation by Ira Progoff, 1980.
- At a Journal Workshop: Writing to Access the Power of the Unconscious and Evoke Creative Ability by Ira Progoff, 1992. ISBN 0-87477-638-4
