= Society of Behavioral Medicine =

- Formation: 1978
- Legal status: Non-profit organization
- Purpose: Research
- Members: 2,400 (2016)
- President: Monica Baskin
- President-elect: David Conroy
- Website: www.sbm.org

The Society of Behavioral Medicine (abbreviated SBM) is an American nonprofit organization dedicated to promoting research in the field of behavioral medicine.

== History ==
SBM was established in 1978, with its first meeting taking place in Chicago, Illinois, on November 16, 1978. Along with the Academy of Behavioral Medicine Research, it grew out of the Yale Conference on Behavioral Medicine, which had been held in 1977. As a multidisciplinary organization, it attempts to connect professionals working in many disparate disciplines, ranging from nursing to public health to psychology.

== Publications ==
The SBM has two official journals: the Annals of Behavioral Medicine and Translational Behavioral Medicine.
