= Ira Progoff =

American psychologist (1921–1998)

Ira Progoff (August 2, 1921 – January 1, 1998) was an American psychotherapist, best known for his development of the Intensive Journal Method while at Drew University. His main interest was in depth psychology and particularly the humanistic adaptation of Jungian ideas to the lives of ordinary people. He founded Dialogue House in New York City to help promote this method.

== Career ==
Progoff served in the United States Army during World War II. He received a PhD in psychology from New School for Social Research in New York City, and in the early 1950s studied with Carl Jung in Switzerland. In that same time period he began exploring psychological methods for creativity and spiritual experience in their social applications. His doctoral dissertation in the field of the social history of ideas at the New School was on the work of C.G. Jung. In 1953, the dissertation was published in hardcover by the Julian Press as Jung's Psychology and its Social Meaning. Later editions were published by the Grove Press, Anchor/Doubleday, and Dialogue House. After receiving his doctorate, Progoff was awarded a Bollingen fellowship, and studied privately with Jung in Switzerland.

This work led to a reconstruction of depth psychology in terms of the later work of Freud, Adler, Jung, and Rank in The Death and Rebirth of Psychology and a first statement of Holistic Depth Psychology in Depth Psychology and Modern Man. In 1963, Progoff put forward the method of Psyche-Evoking in The Symbolic and the Real.

In 1966, Progoff drew from the principles described in these books to introduce the Intensive Journal method of personal development, the innovation for which he is most remembered. This is a nonanalytic, integrative system for evoking and interrelating the contents of an individual life. Progoff wrote two books describing the method: At a Journal Workshop and The Practice of Process Meditation. The system's popularity spread rapidly.

As the public use of the method increased, the National Intensive Journal Program was formed in 1977. It supplied materials and leaders for the conduct of Intensive Journal workshops in the United States and other countries in cooperation with local sponsoring organizations.

The Intensive Journal education program was expanded upon in 1983 with the publication of Life-Study, which described the application of the Intensive Journal process in experiencing the lives of significant persons from past generations.

== Selected works ==
- The Death and Rebirth of Psychology: An integrative evaluation of Freud, Adler, Jung and Rank and the impact of their culminating insights on modern man. New York City, Julian Press. 1956. OCLC 1375551.
- Depth psychology and modern man: A new view of the magnitude of human personality, its dimensions & resources. New York City, Julian Press. 1959. OCLC 1025952.
- The Symbolic & The Real; A New Psychological Approach to the Fuller Experience of Personal Existence. New York City, McGraw-Hill. 1963. OCLC 1039530.
- The Star/Cross: A Cycle of Process Meditation. New York City, Dialogue House Library. 1971. ISBN 0-87941-001-9. OCLC 206826.
- The White Robed Monk: A cycle of process meditation. New York City, Dialogue House. 1972. ISBN 0-87941-002-7. OCLC 409796.
- Jung, synchronicity, & human destiny: Noncausal dimensions of human experience. New York City, Julian Press. 1973. ISBN 0-87097-056-9. OCLC 763819.
- Death and Rebirth of Psychology. New York City, Julian Press. 1974.
- At a Journal Workshop: The Basic Text and Guide for Using the Intensive Journal Process. New York City, Dialogue House. 1975. ISBN 0-87941-003-5. OCLC 1580592.
- The Well and the Cathedral: With an Introduction on Its Use in the Practice of Meditation. New York City, Dialogue House Library. 1977. OCLC 2318423.
- The White Robed Monk: As an Entrance to Process Meditation. New York City, Dialogue House Library. 1979. ISBN 0-87941-007-8. OCLC 4776805.
- The Practice of Process Meditation: The Intensive Journal Way to Spiritual Experience. New York City, Dialogue House Library. 1980. ISBN 0-87941-008-6. OCLC 7064455.
- The Dynamics of Hope: Perspectives of Process in Anxiety and Creativity, Imagery and Dreams. New York City, Dialogue House Library. 1985. ISBN 0-87941-013-2. OCLC 12419811.
- Jung's Psychology and Its Social Meaning: An Integrative Statement of C. G. Jung's Psychological Theories and an Interpretation of Their Significance. New York City, Dialogue House Library. 1985. ISBN 0-87941-014-0. OCLC 12752371.
- Jung, Synchronicity, and Human Destiny: C.G. Jung's Theory of Meaningful Coincidence. New York City, Julian Press. 1987. ISBN 0-517-56636-2. OCLC 15790031.

== See also ==
- Analytical psychology
- Depth psychology
- Intensive Journal Method
