= Journal of Behavioral Medicine =

Behavioural sciences medicine journal

- Discipline: Behavioral sciences, medicine
- Language: English
- Edited by: Alan Christensen

Publication details
- History: 1978–present
- Publisher: Springer Science+Business Media
- Frequency: Bimonthly
- Impact factor: 2.5 (2016)

Standard abbreviations
- ISO 4: J. Behav. Med.

Indexing
- CODEN: JBMEDD
- ISSN: 0160-7715 (print); 1573-3521 (web)
- LCCN: 78645188
- OCLC no.: 03763102

Links
- Journal homepage

The Journal of Behavioral Medicine is an interdisciplinary medical journal published by Springer Science+Business Media, addressing the interactions of the behavioral sciences with other fields of medicine.
