= List of pupils of Jean-Léon Gérôme =

This is an incomplete list of the pupils of Jean-Léon Gérôme.

- Laureano Barrau
- Jacques Barcat
- Henri Beau
- Osman Hamdi Bey
- Pascal Dagnan-Bouveret
- Georges Ferdinand Bigot
- Frank Myers Boggs
- Frederick Arthur Bridgman
- George de Forest Brush
- Edwin Lord Weeks
- George Bridgman
- Dennis Miller Bunker
- Eugène Burnand
- Mary Cassatt
- Stanisław Chlebowski
- Gustave-Claude-Etienne Courtois
- Kenyon Cox
- William de Leftwich Dodge
- Wynford Dewhurst, R.B.A.
- Thomas Millie Dow
- Thomas Eakins
- Wyatt Eaton
- Albert Edelfelt
- Delphin Enjolras
- Herbert Cyrus Farnum
- Jacques Gay
- Gabriel Guay
- Wlastimil Hofman
- Edmund Aubrey Hunt
- Jerzy Karszniewicz
- Paul-Eugène Mesplès
- Henri-Paul Motte
- Henry Siddons Mowbray
- Aloysius O'Kelly
- Lawton S. Parker
- William McGregor Paxton
- Paul Peel
- R. G. Harper Pennington
- William Picknell
- Théophile Poilpot
- Théodore Ralli
- Odilon Redon
- Jules Ernest Renoux
- Carl Frederick von Saltza
- Julius LeBlanc Stewart
- Abbott Handerson Thayer
- Vasili Vasilyevich Vereshchagin
- Douglas Volk
- J. Alden Weir
- William Stott of Oldham
- Hosui Yamamoto
