= Pediatric psychology =

Child and adolescent health psychology

Pediatric psychology is a multidisciplinary field of both scientific research and clinical practice which attempts to address the psychological aspects of illness, injury, and the promotion of health behaviors in children, adolescents, and families in a pediatric health setting. Psychological issues are addressed in a developmental framework and emphasize the dynamic relationships which exist between children, their families, and the health delivery system as a whole.

Common areas of study include psychosocial development, environmental factors which contribute to the development of a disorder, outcomes of children with medical conditions, treating the comorbid behavioral and emotional components of illness and injury, and promoting proper health behaviors, developmental disabilities, educating psychologists and other health professionals on the psychological aspects of pediatric conditions, and advocating for public policy that promotes children's health.

== Role of the pediatric psychologist ==
The field of pediatric psychology developed to address unmet needs for psychological services in the pediatric setting and the field blends together several distinct areas in psychology (such as behavioral medicine, health psychology, developmental psychology, etc.) (Roberts, Maddux, Wurtele, & Wright, 1982). Pediatric psychology is an integrated field of science and practice in which the principles of psychology are applied within the environment of pediatric health. The Society of Pediatric Psychology (SPP, Division 54) resides under the American Psychological Association (APA), see http://www.apadivisions.org/division-54/index.aspx. SPP aims to promote health and psychological well-being of children, adolescents, and their families through the promotion of evidence-based science and practice, education, training, and advocacy. The field was founded in 1969 and includes a broad interdisciplinary foundation, drawing on clinical, developmental, social, cognitive, behavioral, counseling, community and school psychology.

Pediatric psychologists work in a variety of settings and fulfill various roles such as (Spirito, 2003):

(1) Providing psychosocial services for problems related to pediatric health conditions

(2) Psychological services for mental health problems appearing in medical settings—which involves mental issues related to medical conditions or the treatment of them, coping related to acute and chronic illnesses, adherence, quality of life, pain, traumatic medical stress, adjustment related issues on the psycho-social continuum, school reintegration, and behavioral problems

(3) Psychological services for mental health problems without concomitant health condition

(4) Programs for promotion of health/prevention and early intervention

(5) Provide assistance for those with intellectual and/or developmental disabilities

(6) Psychological training and consultation for physicians

(7) Public health and public policy.

Interventions are not just illness-related, but address behavioral problems as well. The settings that pediatric psychologists work in allows for brief interventions that are economical and time efficient. Collaboration with the health care providers allows for more targeted assessment and interventions.

Pediatric healthcare providers seem to value the work of pediatric psychologists (Stancin, Perrin, and Ramirez, 2009): "Recently, a surge of interest by pediatricians on the identification and care of children with mental health problems has resulted from the recognition that:

• Precursors of mental health disorders in adulthood can often be identified in early childhood (e.g. Anda et al., 2007)

• At least 10% of children and adolescents have functional impairment due to a diagnosed mental health and/or substance abuse disorder (U.S. Department of Health and Human Services, 1999), and up to 25% have clinically significant problems that may not (yet) rise to the level of a diagnosable psychiatric disorder (Briggs-Gowan et al., 2003).

• There is a shortage of qualified mental health clinicians, especially for children younger than 5, and for families in middle-and-low income groups and/or of minority background.

• Primary care settings provide the most accessible and least stigmatizing resources for many families who have concerns about their children's developmental and/or behavior."

== Scope ==
According to the work of a recent task force commissioned by the Society of Pediatric Psychology, Division 54 of the American Psychological Association, 12 topic areas adapted from Roberts et al. (1998) were identified as important areas of expertise in pediatric psychology:

1. Lifespan development
2. Lifespan developmental psychopathology: the effects of one's disease and medical regimen on emotional, social, and behavioral development; additionally, normal developmental milestones may be used such that preventative efforts can be created and well-child visits can include a psychological-developmental perspective
3. Child, adolescent, and family assessment: experience with the assessment of health-related concerns such as health promotion, health risk, health outcome, and quality of life
4. Intervention strategies: Exposure to and experience with empirically supported interventions specifically applicable in pediatric psychology and delivered in health care settings
5. Research methods and systems evaluation: Exposure to research design issues especially pertinent to pediatric psychology such as health services research and clinical trials
6. Professional, ethical, and legal issues pertaining to children, adolescents, and families: knowledge and experience with issues such as health care delivery, practice of psychology in medical settings, and rights of caregivers vs. children when making decisions regarding medical care
7. Issues of diversity: Experience with patients from diverse ethnic and cultural backgrounds, as well as sexual orientations, in health care settings and understanding of nonmainstream health practices influenced by a family's cultural or religious beliefs
8. The role of multiple disciplines in service-delivering systems: Experience on multidisciplinary teams delivering health care services
9. Prevention, family support, and health promotion: understanding the principles of behavior change as they relate to healthy development, health-risk behavior, and prevention of disease in adulthood
10. Social issues affecting children, adolescents, and families: exposure to and experience with advocacy in pediatric health care including social issues that affect health care delivery
11. Consultant and liaison roles in health care settings: Exposure to different consultation-liaison models and supervised experience providing consultation
12. Disease process and medical management: A basic understanding of various diseases and their medical management.

The field of pediatric psychology recognizes that pediatric conditions have emotional/psychological aspects, the presenting problems require integrated medical-psychological interventions, and traditional pediatric and/or clinical psychology could not meet the needs.

== Future issues ==
Pediatric psychology is a growing field and several topics have been raised that need to be addressed within the field and were discussed in a Delphic Poll on the future of pediatric psychology:

1. Pediatric psychologists must demonstrate viability through empirical support for treatment interventions, which requires continued efforts to demonstrate improvements in pediatric outcomes (health, quality of life, psychological functioning, development) due to pediatric psychologists' efforts. This also requires evidence of medical cost offset, evidence of the efficacy of the integration of clinical research and practice, and evidence of the effectiveness of psychological interventions in decreasing societal costs related to pediatric conditions.

2. We must also increasingly integrate psychologist into the pediatric primary care setting by providing mental health services directly to patients in primary care settings, provide consultation and collaborative relationships with pediatricians and allied staff, and conduct clinically based research on primary care barriers in care.

3. Financial reimbursement policies need to be changed and the responsibility to makes these changes lies within several interacting disciplines—health policy-makers, health care institutions, and pediatric psychologists and their collaborators such as pediatricians. Several factors should be addressed, such as: creating non-DSM categories of reimbursable services, eliminating behavioral health carve-outs, payment for multidisciplinary team services, and developing service systems that recognize the complexity of problems in children and families. Currently, depending on the clinic and hospital that the psychologist is affiliated with, their services may or may not be covered by insurance or the institution's funds and reimbursement issues prevent pediatric psychologists from intervening in the most effective ways. Pediatric psychologists are trained in data analysis and research and so efforts should be made to demonstrate the benefits of pediatric psychologists and pediatricians collaborating such that the necessary reimbursements are instituted (http://www.nextgenmd.org/archives/808). Currently, research findings indicate that psychological interventions can decrease medical costs (Chiles, Lambert & Hatch, 1999). Future research should also target patient satisfaction.

4. Collaboration between pediatricians and psychologists in clinical research and practice activities.

5. Emphasize importance of prevention of problems in childhood and promotion of optimal physical and mental health Here are a few examples concerning how pediatric psychologists have improved services:

Primary Care Example: There are an increasing number of empirically supported interventions available for the treatment of common childhood problems appropriate to treat in the primary care setting (i.e. disruptive behavior disorders, mood disorders, non-adherence to medical treatments, etc.). For example, Lavigne and colleagues (2008) compared three interventions for Oppositional defiant disorder (ODD) in primary care. Pediatric practices (N = 24) were randomly assigned to receive (1) nurse-led or (2) psychologist-led group manualized parent training treatment, or (3) minimum intervention in which the treatment book was used. Sustained improvements occurred in all three conditions. However, there were better results for parents who attended more of the intervention sessions. This is evidence that primary care environments are an appropriate setting for delivering services.

Prevention/Early Intervention Example: Pediatric psychologists can take a lead both in developing interventions and test their effectiveness in promoting vaccine acceptance and knowledge such that children are more likely to be vaccinated (Short, Rosenthal, Sturm, Zimet, 2009). For example, education-based tutorials created by pediatric psychologists to improve providers' knowledge of and comfort with addressing parents' concerns related to childhood immunizations is one promising approach that has been researched and found to be effective (i.e. Boom, Nelson, Laugman, Kohrt, & Kozinetz, 2007; Levi, 2006).

== History of pediatric psychology ==
The "official" history of pediatric psychology dates to 1968 when the Society of Pediatric Psychology was established within the American Psychological Association. However, its origins date back to the early 1900s and Lightner Witmer. Often considered the father of clinical psychology, Witmer spent a good deal of his time working in tandem with physicians to improve children's behaviors. Considering the roughly 70 years between Witmer and the formation of the SPP, this merging of medicine and psychology was a slow progression.

In 1911, the APA conducted a survey of medical schools regarding their view of psychology within medicine. While responses were favorable to the benefit of psychology in the medical school setting, there was no action to implement such teachings. This action started following the Second World War, when there was an increase in federal funding for clinical psychology and the employment of psychologists in medical schools. In fact, 80 percent of schools surveyed in 1951–1952 reported employing psychologists. However, it was thought that most were in psychiatric settings, not pediatric psychology positions

Specific to pediatric psychology, in 1930, Anderson presented to the American Medical Association that he thought pediatrics and child psychology should work together on mutually important issues, but there was apparently limited response. The 1960s saw a growing number of pediatricians fielding questions regarding parent training. As a result, in 1964, the then president of the American Pediatric Society, Julius Richmond, suggested that pediatricians hire clinical psychologists to work with behavioral problems in children.

The field was advanced when Jerome Kagan identified a number of areas the psychologist could be of help in the "new marriage" of pediatrics and psychology. He addressed psychologists' role in early identification of disorders and interventions. Much like a clinical-child psychologist, Kagan believed this role included a wide range of psychopathology. Logan Wright, however, had a different idea of what a pediatric psychologists job should address. Narrower in scope, he suggested pediatric psychologists take a more behavioral approach and deal with issues of parent training, child development, and short-term therapy.

With the public and professional momentum for pediatric psychology forged by Wright, the APA formed a committee to determine whether a formal organization was needed. The committee, consisting of Logan Wright, Lee Salk, and Dorothea Ross, discovered a need would be filled, and at the annual APA convention in 1968, formed the Society for Pediatric Psychology. The following year, SPP was recognized as an affiliate of APA Division 12 (Clinical Psychology), Section 1 (Clinical Child Psychology) . At the inaugural SPP meeting in 1969, Logan Wright was elected the first president.

Medical schools employing psychologists in pediatric settings were also on the rise. This increase in demand resulted in federal funding for the establishment of the National Institute of Child Health and Human Development in 1962. Four years later it helped fund the first pediatric psychology training program at the University of Iowa.

Over the next decade, SPP would consider sectionhood with several divisions (12, 37, 38) before officially becoming Section 5 of Division 12 in 1980. ." Here it would continue to grow until 2000 when it developed into Division 54 of the APA .

By 1984, SPP had a solid foundation with growing membership and journal recognition. While pediatric psychologists work under the science-practitioner model, the trend at this time saw more practitioners. Employed predominantly in medical settings, there was immediate need for clinical application of skills to work with severe behavior problems. Kagan's vision of researcher in this setting would have to wait.

Gary Mesibov noted that pediatric psychologists worked frequently with developmental disorders in children. Specifically, children with intellectual disabilities, learning disabilities, cerebral palsy, autism, and related developmental problems. When not working directly with children, pediatric psychologists role included had a few other components. The demand and importance of parent training for children with developmental problems made it the subject of the SPP programming at the APA convention for 1983. The collaboration with other professionals on site (e.g., speech and language therapists) provided education in outside domains and in working as a member of an interdisciplinary team. Furthermore, pediatric psychologists helped to create programs in the community addressing children's needs.

In 1988, then SPP president Walker presented recent survey findings to address current and future trends in the field regarding the areas of research, training, and clinical service. Psychologists surveyed were selected based on either serving on the Journal of Pediatric Psychology review board, or functioning as the director of a pediatric training program. Twenty-seven pediatric psychologists participated in the survey. The top three research trends ranked at the time included: chronic illness, prevention, and cost/benefit of interventions. Walker personally emphasized his concern with parenting practices with regard to prevention. In addressing children's emotional well-being, Walker stated prevention provides the best solution

Clinical service trends ranked in order of importance for the future included: pediatric behavioral medicine, effective treatment protocols from common problems, and the role in medical setting. Walker attempted to assuage the contention surrounding the definition of pediatric psychologists role by teasing out the differences from clinical child psychology. Walker noted differences lie in conceptualization, intervention setting, and the intervention course of treatment, among others. While most pediatric psychologists were employed in medical schools and universities, Walker believed future trends would include more pediatric psychologists working as part of a multidisciplinary team in hospitals and health clinics.

The final area of interest ranked training areas of importance for future pediatric psychologists. The top three included: brief treatment techniques, residency model, and biological and medical issues. At the time, pediatric psychology was considered a subspecialty within the field of clinical child psychology debating whether to branch out as its own field.

In a brief article following his reception of the 1990 Distinguished Service Award from the SPP, Mesibov reflected on three unique, or "special" characteristics he identified within the field of pediatric psychology. Specifically, he applauded the field's practical application to tackle difficult human needs, multidisciplinary approach, and character of pediatric psychologists he has worked with throughout his career.

== History of Journal and Newsletter ==
The development of SPP produced the need for formal communication among members in the field. Thanks to the work of Allan Barclay and Lee Salk, a newsletter was created. The Pediatric Psychology Newsletter, distributed quarterly, was launched in 1969, with Gail Gardner acting as first editor. However, due to SPP's limited funds in the early years, publication ceased from 1970 to 1972. With the help of growing membership and generous contributions from early members, the newsletter was restarted and saw continued growth from 1972 to 1975. The quality and volume of submissions to the newsletter resulted in the transition to the Journal of Pediatric Psychology (JPP) in 1976. The newsletter per se would not emerge again until 1980, under the leadership of Michael Roberts.

The JPP began steady publication in 1973 under the appointment of Diane Willis as editor. A professor of psychology at University at Oklahoma and psychologist at the OU Child Study Center, she served as editor from 1973 to 1975, helping create the peer review system in place today, expanding content published, and seeing it go from Newsletter to Journal.

In 1976, Don Routh began serving as editor with Gary Mesibov serving as associate editor. He would serve two terms. Although still under financial uncertainty, several important events occurred during this time. In 1976, Psychological Abstracts recognized the JPP. This also marked the beginning of international subscriptions requested. The following year, APA gave JPP status as a division journal. The popularity of the Journal continued to grow. Common topics of the JPP included chronic pain and hyperactivity. The most important event, however, may be the successful contract negotiation with Plenum Publishing in 1979 which helped alleviate the ongoing financial concerns of the organization.

The third editor of JPP, Gerald Koocher, served from 1983 to 1987. Michael Roberts became associate editor. The growth of JPP was evident as approximately 100 articles were submitted annually for publication. As a result, the Journal became more selective in its acceptance, at a rate of 29 percent. Furthermore, partnership with Plenum Publishing was renegotiated, and the editorial board expanding membership. Chronic illness continued to be topic "de jour," but more applied research emerged.

Michael Roberts served as editor from 1988 to 1992. Associate editors included Annette La Greca, Dennis Harper, and Jan Wallander. Under Roberts' leadership, JPP transitioned from a quarterly to bimonthly publication. While chronic pain remained the theme of most publications, more publications featured grant-funded research.

Annette La Greca followed Roberts as editor, serving from 1993 to 1997. Associate editors across this span included Wallander, Dennis Drotar, Kathleen Lemanek, and later, Anne Kazak. The JPP continued its steady growth, and more papers were dedicated to special themes, explanatory and longitudinal in design, and nonintentional injuries. The submission rate grew and, as a result, only 16–18 percent submitted were published.

Kazak took over as editor from 1998 to 2002. Associate editors included Lemanek, Christine Eiser, Antohony Spirito, Jack Finney, and Robert Thompson. The JPP finished its contract with Plenum Publishing at this time and decided to sign a new contract with Oxford University Press. Her term also saw the journal increase to 8 issues a year and provide online access to its members. Kazak was succeeded by Ron Brown, who served as editor from 2003 to 2007. Drotar took taking over the editorial reins during 2008–2012 and Grayson Holmbeck served starting in 2013.

== Biopsychosocial model and health psychology ==
In the past, most physicians followed the biomedical model which posited that all illness can be explained by improper functioning of the biological systems. By 1977, With the large leaps in medical science forced and changing views of health and illness doctors and psychologists to begin, alike, began to questioning their old methods of treating patients. This new method of thought is the biopsychosocial model, and it was heavily influenced by two main issues: the specificity problem and the base rate problem.

=== Specificity problem ===
This problem address the fact one environmental stressor is often associated with many different disorders. An example of this would be work stress. Being stressed out at work can lead to hypertension; however, it can also lead to coronary heart disease. It is nearly impossible to tell which path will be taken as a result of the stress, and it could result in both.

=== Base rate problem ===
This problem states that it is very hard to predict whether the presence of a stressor will lead to the development of a disorder. The reason behind this is that experiencing the environmental stressor may lead to developing the disorder. However, diagnosing a patient on this alone would result in an absurd number of false positives. An example of this would be smoking and cancer. If doctors were to diagnose everyone who ever smoked a cigarette or a cigar with cancer it would quickly become apparent that it is an ineffective diagnostic criterion because many individuals would not develop lung cancer.

=== Holistic method ===
The main premise of the biopsychosocial model is that you cannot separate the biological factors from the environmental factors when addressing an illness; you must view a person as part of a whole, or a system. The system theory is one of the best methods in which to observe this holistic model. The systems theory states that an individual exists within a hierarchy of subsystems (e.g. cells, person, family, society, etc.), and all of these subsystems interact. For example, if one were to lose a family member the individual may feel stressed which in turn may weaken his immune system and cause him or her to catch a cold. While the cold is considered biological in nature (i.e. a bacterium or a virus), it was aided by outside factors. This is a great example of how the biopsychosocial model approaches medical conditions. In order to effectively assess an illness, one must identify and treat all contributing factors as well as the actual biological factors. This need to address physical, mental, and social needs (among many others) leads to health psychology, and from this the field of pediatric psychology.

== Origins ==
World War II gave way to a rise in the number of psychologists that worked in medical schools. The pediatric population doctors worked with had a variety of problems in addition to their illness. Doctors had children as patients with a variety of problems (e.g., developmental, behavioral, academic). Patients and their families were not receiving adequate attention from psychology clinics at the time.

To meet the needs of pediatric patients Jerome Kagan requested a "new marriage" between psychology and pediatrics, stressing early detection of psychopathology and psychosocial problems. Understanding prenatal- and perinatal factors relating to psychological problems was also emphasized.

The term "pediatric psychology" was first used in 1967 by Logan Wright in the article "The Pediatric Psychologist: A Role Model," and was defined as "dealing primarily with children in a medical setting which is nonpsychiatric in nature". Wright emphasized the importance of:

- group identity for the pediatric psychology field (formal organization, distributing newsletter)
- specifications for training future pediatric psychologists
- body of knowledge accumulated by means of applied research

== Organizational developments ==
Pediatric psychologists established a group identity with the Society of Pediatric Psychology (SPP). SPP was initially an interest group in the Clinical Child Psychology division of the APA. As membership elevated, SPP was recognized by the APA as a group whose purpose was to "exchange information on clinical procedures and research, and to define training standards for the pediatric psychologist". With this new-found recognition, division 54 of the APA was created. Some of the main goals of this organization are to promote the unique research and clinical contributions from pediatric psychology.

The Journal of Pediatric Psychology was founded in 1976, and it has helped to further the professional recognition of the field. It allowed for clinicians, teachers, and researchers alike to exchange ideas and new discoveries. It is a respected scholarly journal which aims to increase the knowledge regarding children who have acute and chronic illness and attempt to identify and resolve the contributing factors in order to yield optimal outcomes.

== Society of Pediatric Psychology Special Interest Groups (SPP) ==
The Pediatric Psychology APA Division 54 formed Special Interests Groups (SIGs) and they consist of the following: Adherence Special Interest Group, Consultation and Liaison Special Interest Group, Craniofacial Special Interest Group, Complementary and Alternative Medicine Special Interest Group, Diversity Special Interest Group, Epilepsy Special Interest Group, Obesity Special Interest Group, Pediatric Bioethics Special Interest Group, Pediatric Cardiology Special Interest Group, Pediatric Gastroenterology Special Interest Group. The motive of a SIG is to promote the nationwide connection of SPP members for a determined area of interest.

=== Adherence & Self-Management Special Interest Group ===
The Adherence & Self-Management Interest Group promotes evidence-based approaches to research and clinical service targeting the assessment and treatment of regimen adherence concerns in youth and families across a variety of chronic health conditions.

The World Health Organization (2003) has labeled poor adherence to prescription medications and treatment a "worldwide problem of striking magnitude". Adherence according to the WHO (2003) is defined as "the extent to which a person's behavior—taking medication, following a diet, and/or executing lifestyle changes, corresponds with agreed recommendations from a health care provider" (Haynes, 1979; Rand, 1993). Non-adherence influences health care utilization and costs, morbidity, and health outcomes (Drotar, 2000). Potentially effective treatments become ineffective by non-adherence and clinical benefits are not received. For example, up to 20% of patients fail to fill new prescriptions and 50% of people with chronic health conditions discontinue their medication within six months. Adherence to behavioral treatments is also poor. For example, no more than 30% of patients quit smoking at their provider's request, even those with lung conditions. At the same rate, the leading causes of death (Heart disease, cancer, stroke and chronic lower respiratory diseases- see https://www.cdc.gov/nchs/fastats/lcod.htm) contain behavioral related causes and treatments. Therefore, adherence is a lifelong, mortality risk.

Additionally, higher rates of adherence result in economic benefits. For example, direct savings may be accrued by reduced use of expensive and sophisticated health services needed in cases of crises, relapse, and worsening disease outcomes due to non-adherence. Research suggests that when self-management and adherence program are combined with regular treatment, there is an increase in health-promoting behaviors and a cost to savings ratio of approximately 1:10 in some cases and results persisted over 3 years (see Holman et al., 1997; Tuldra et al., 2000

Access to medical care is vitally important, but if people do not comply with their professional recommendations, then mere access will not lead to better health outcomes. Thus, generating innovative methods to enhance childhood adherence has become increasingly more important because effective preventive efforts must begin at an early age, starting with healthy lifestyle behaviors and increased adherence. For example, "a pediatric psychologist may work with a young child who has cystic fibrosis and who refuses to complete all his daily medical treatments that are essential to his health. The psychologist might work with the child's caregivers on how to interact with the child when he refuses his medical treatments and how to implement a reward system to reinforce his adherence to treatments." http://www.nextgenmd.org/archives/808. Also, challenging family interaction styles can play a role in adherence. In particular, families with divorced parents may struggle with communication concerning a child's illness and treatment. Pediatric psychologists may intervene by working with the parents to find a way to communicate more effective so that barriers to adherence are removed.

=== Craniofacial Special Interest Group ===
The Craniofacial special interest groups consists of members of the Society of Pediatric Psychology who share an interest in craniofacial conditions.

=== Complementary and Alternative Medicine Special Interest Group ===
The Complementary and Integrative Medicine special interest group is a forum for communication and discussion about the role of CIM as it relates to advancing the health and well-being of pediatric populations.

=== Consultation and Liaison Special Interest Group ===
The mission of the Consultation and Liaison Special Interest Group is to promote discussion, education, research, and networking among pediatric psychologists who provided consultation and liaison services to pediatric patients and their families.

Pediatric Consultation-Liaison is a subspecialty practice of pediatric psychology and represents the most active collaboration between pediatricians and pediatric psychologists. According to the 2003 Society of Pediatric Psychology Task Force Report: Recommendations for the Training of Pediatric Psychologists, consultation-liaison roles are one of the types of experience most important to developing competencies in pediatric psychology. Pediatric psychologists often consult with pediatricians and providers from other disciplines in a variety of inpatient and outpatient settings. They have a working understanding of various consultation models and often consult with and educate patients, their families, physicians, other health-care providers school psychologists, counselors, teachers, and other professionals regarding pediatric illness and accompanying psychosocial issues. Pediatric psychologists also act as liaisons with medical subspecialties and provide support to other professionals for issues related to the management of difficult families, stressful physician and family interactions, professional burnout, bereavement, and negotiating stressful situations.

==== Consultation-Liaison Models ====
===== Consultation vs. Liaison Emphasis =====
Often considered synonymous, the terms "consultation" and "liaison" have important distinctions. While many psychologists provide both services, pediatric psychologists acting in a consultant role are directly involved in patient care only at the request of a referring physician or service. In a consultation arrangement, the relationship between the consultant and physicians is often time-limited—when consultation services are terminated, the relationship often ends. Pediatric psychologists in a liaison role are often involved in the day-to-day workings of a particular hospital service or unit and are formally embedded within a department or working service. Psychologists in a liaison role are often involved in all of the systemic and mental health concerns of the unit, not just the concerns of referred patients.

===== Patient-Centered vs. Systems-Centered Focus =====
Consultation-liaison models are sometimes differentiated based on whether the focus of the services are primarily on the patient ("patient-centered") or on the larger system the patient and family must rely on for medical care ("systems-centered"). In patient-centered services, the primary goal is to evaluate the patient in order to provide direct treatment. In systems-centered services, the focus of the services are on creating change in the professionals requesting the services to make them more effective in the intervention with the case in question, as well as in other similar cases.

==== Inpatient Pediatric Consultation-Liaison ====
As an inpatient pediatric consultation—liaison, the pediatric psychologist advises physicians or other medical professionals or provides direct services to medically hospitalized children regarding behavioral, emotional, or familial aspects of the child's illness and symptoms. The consultation-liaison psychologist's primary role includes evaluating children and their families for mental health concerns; recommending and providing treatments; and educating families, staff, and referring physicians on a wide array of factors associated with adjustment to medical illness and injury. Patient interventions include teaching coping skills, evaluating side effects of medication, helping manage physical pain, and addressing physical pain, among others. Defined narrowly, inpatient pediatric consultation-liaison involves a pediatric psychologist providing assessment and guidance to a pediatrician colleague regarding the care of a specific patient. Broadly defined, the pediatric consultation-liaison psychologist is a systems-level catalyst—in educating and empowering multiple interacting components of the health care system, fostering a responsive environment that maximizes the overall quality of life and psychological adjustment of patients and their families.

===== Research on inpatient pediatric consultation-liaison services =====
There are few studies illustrating the breadth of services provided by pediatric consultation-liaison psychologists. In a survey of 144 children's hospital-based child psychiatry consultation-liaison services, Shaw and colleagues reported that returned surveys (33%) indicated that the most common referral concerns for consultation-liaison services included patient depression, anxiety, suicide risk assessment, and medication evaluation.

In the only case-controlled study of pediatric consultation-liaison services, Carter and colleagues (2003) matched 104 referrals with controls for age, gender, and illness type or severity and completed parent- and self-report behavioral rating scales to assess for adjustment. Nurses completed in-hospital ratings of behavioral or adjustment difficulties. Goal attainment and satisfaction ratings were obtained from referring physicians, parents, and the consultant. Results indicated that referrals exhibited more behavior, adjustment, or coping difficulties than nonreferrals by parent-, nurse- and self-report. Referring physician and consultant ratings of goal attainment were high, as were physician ratings of satisfaction and parent or guardian ratings of overall helpfulness of the consultation-liaison services. Referral sources included equal distributions from hematology/oncology, surgery/trauma, pulmonology, and other sources. Reasons for referral included assisting children in coping with physical illness/injury, improving treatment adherence, assessing and treating depression and anxiety, teaching pain management techniques, assisting with parent coping, helping with adjustment to medical diagnoses, and resolving family conflicts.

In a review of clinical reports and treatment outcome studies on pediatric consultation-liaison services, Knapp and Harris surveyed illness-specific and general investigations into the psychiatric care of children with medical illnesses. They concluded that pediatric consultation–liaison services are playing an increasing role in addressing the emotional and behavioral needs of pediatric inpatients by helping patients and their families adapt to stressors associated with chronic illness.

Olson and colleagues reviewed the records of 749 inpatient referrals seen by pediatric psychologists at Oklahoma Children's Hospital over a 5-year period. In order of greatest frequency, referrals were for depression or suicide attempt, adjustment problems to chronic illness, and behavior problems. Consultations were most frequently requested by general pediatrics followed by surgery and adolescent medicine. Nearly a third of the referrals were also seen for outpatient follow-up. Health care providers making referrals were generally very satisfied with the services of the pediatric consultation-liaison team and reported a high likelihood of making future referrals.

In another study, Rodrigue and colleagues reviewed 1,467 records of referrals (448 inpatient, 1,019 outpatient) to a health sciences center-based pediatric psychology service at the University of Florida Health Sciences Center. The majority of inpatient referrals were from general pediatrics (40%), pediatric hematology or oncology (31%), adolescent psychiatry (15%), pediatric intensive care (5%), and the burn unit (4%). The most common reason for referral (inpatient and outpatient) was assessment of cognitive or neuropsychological functioning. Next were externalizing behavior problems, comprehensive psychological evaluation, pre-surgery or transplant evaluation, and adjustment problems to chronic illness. They also reported that retrospective survey results suggested high overall satisfaction with service quality.

In an early study of referral problems for pediatric consultation-liaison services, Drotar reported that referral questions included evaluation of developmental delay, adaptation and adjustment to chronic illness or physical disability, concerns regarding the psychological factors in physical symptom presentation, behavior problems, and managing psychological crises.

===== Five C's of pediatric consultation-liaison services =====
Using an alliterative mnemonic device called the "Five C's of Consultation: Crisis, Coping, Compliance (Adherence), Communication and Collaboration," Carter and von Weiss characterize the activities of pediatric-liaison services according to overlapping arenas of intervention and practice under which the majority of referrals can be categorized.

====== Crisis ======
Following diagnosis of a potentially serious illness or injury, patients and their families are often in a state of shock and disbelief. At this time, the details and decisions of medical evaluation and treatment may be overwhelming and bewildering. Very focused interventions are often needed to help them achieve some sense of basic understanding and control of the situation. Consultation-liaison skills that enable psychologists to act in crisis situations include crisis intervention, needs assessment, providing direction, mobilization of social supports, identifying areas for parental or child control, and interpreting and reframing child or family reactions to staff. A medical crisis counseling model that lends itself particularly well to pediatric crisis situations has been developed by Pollin. In this model, the consultant focuses on the patient's medical condition, and directs interventions toward normalizing the patient's and the family's state of emotional distress while helping the patient and family identify concrete actions they can take in order to cope successfully.

====== Coping ======
Children are exposed to many stressors associated with acute and chronic illness and injury during the course of evaluation and treatment. Acute stressors include short and lengthy medical procedures such as venipunctures, injections, hospitalizations, surgeries and chemotherapy, among others. Other stressors accompanying chronic illnesses may impact the child and family for months, years, or even a lifetime, often with an uncertain prognosis.

Pediatric consultation-liaison psychologists need to be aware of individual and developmental factors when designing interventions to help children adapt to the stressors of illness or injury and treatment; for example, limited linguistic and cognitive abilities limit the knowledge and understanding of health concepts of younger children, thus limiting their ability to use internal coping resources and reach out to external supports when compared to older children or adolescents. Children's coping styles also differ; for example, some children attempt to gather information and familiarize themselves with upcoming procedures, whereas others avoid discussing stressors and refuse to look at or distract themselves from stressful stimuli. Differences in coping styles have been shown to be associated with the child's adaptation to surgery and hospitalization, lower physiological stress response, and child cooperation pre- and post-surgery. There is evidence suggesting that primary control, strategies whereby a child modifies the objective situation, are most effective when employed to cope with stressors over which the child has control, whereas secondary control strategies, strategies involving the child modifying emotional and behavioral reactions to the stressor, are most effective with uncontrollable stressors.

Interventions to facilitate child and family coping often begin with providing basic information and education about their illness and treatment procedures, often using videotaped or in vivo models to demonstrate the use of positive coping strategies and teach mastery skills. Other coping interventions include cognitive-behavioral and strength-building interventions, operant reward programs, integrating parent participation, evaluation and mobilization of family and social supports, assisting patient and family in understanding and navigating the medical system, directive and expressive medical play therapy, pain and anxiety management skills training, sensitizing medical staff to patient needs and perceptions, and psychopharmacological interventions.

====== Compliance (Adherence) ======
Adherence to medical treatment regimens is a major pediatric health concern, with estimates on nonadherence as high as 50% or higher. Children's adherence to their medical regimens is heavily influenced by developmental, as well as family factors. Medical management of chronic and serious pediatric illness often requires stressful role relationship changes within the family that require redistribution of time and redefinition of responsibilities. The impact of these changes can be far reaching, affecting such factors as marital satisfaction and parent adjustment. Nonadherence to prescribed medical regimens can be the result of variety of factors including lack of education and training in the regimen, difficulty in understanding the procedures, fearfulness and anxiety, interference of the treatment with normal activities, and parent or child dynamics, among others.

Nonadherence or poor adherence to medical regimens may adversely affect the health of the pediatric patient, resulting in hospitalization to address disease processes and adherence issues. Nonadherence issues include failure to administer medications as prescribed, failure to follow dietary guidelines, defiance of physical activity restrictions, and uncooperativeness with medical procedures. Several methods might be employed the help patients and their families monitor adherence, including direct observations of the patient's behavior; assays of blood, urine, or saliva; self-report, health care provider ratings, pill counts, and a variety of monitoring devices, for example, blood glucose meters. Interventions that can be sued to facilitate patient and family adherence in the inpatient pediatric setting include providing information and education, teaching mastery skills, behavioral management contracting, removing barriers, monitoring and charting performance of medical treatment components, addressing family or health care system dynamics, normalizing or reframing the patient's condition, altering patient or family lifestyle behaviors, altering expectations of family or health care providers to coincide with realistic developmental needs, negotiation and compromise.

====== Communication ======
Pediatric consultation-liaison psychologists often deal with situations wherein medical staff members have made a referral due to behavioral difficulties with the child or their family that are disruptive to the functioning of the hospital unit. Often overwhelmed, bewildered, and at the point of significant frustration and defensiveness, the patient and their family are frequently unaware of the referral, which places the consultant in a potentially volatile situation. Strong diplomatic and communication skills, as well as sensitivity to patient, family, and hospital staff issues, are required in such situations By arranging and coordinating staffings on difficult and complex cases, maintaining a regular presence at service rounds and team meetings, fostering ongoing collaborative relationships with hospital staff, promoting ever increasing cultural sensitivity, and respectfully listening to and reframing patient or family and staff behaviors to facilitate understanding across all parties involved, the pediatric consultation-liaison psychologist can do much to defuse potentially volatile situations.

====== Collaboration ======
Carter and von Weiss suggest that while Collaboration is listed one of the five C's, it cannot be emphasized enough because it underlies the potential successfulness of practice in the other four. The relationship between the pediatric psychologist and the referring services has evolved out of shared goals in the areas of research, teaching, and service. Close collaborative relationships have the potential of having a critical impact on the clinical care of patients and their families.

=== Diversity Special Interest Group ===
The Diversity Special Interest Group is committed to promoting diversity in pediatric psychology research and clinical care, to increasing the number of Society of Pediatric Psychology members from diverse backgrounds, and to providing services and resources for members who are from underrepresented groups.

=== Epilepsy Special Interest Group ===
The Epilepsy Special Interest Group's goals are to increase awareness of epilepsy among Society of Pediatric Psychology members, foster communication between and support for pediatric psychologists, and liaison with the American Epilepsy Society.

=== Obesity Special Interest Group ===
The Obesity Special Interest Group provides education, training and mentoring of psychologists in the care of overweight/obese youth and advocacy for public policy.

=== Pediatric Bioethics Special Interest Group ===
The Pediatric Bioethics Special Interest Group provides a forum to discuss challenges, share ideas and resources, and pursue collaborative relationships with a community of other pediatric psychologists.

=== Pediatric Cardiology Special Interest Group ===
The Pediatric Cardiology special interest group promotes the discussion of issues faced by pediatric psychologists who work with children who have congenital heart disease, cardiac transplant, or other cardiac conditions.

=== Pediatric Gastroenterology Special Interest Group ===
The mission of this Pediatric Gastroenterology Special Interest Group is to facilitate the study and discussion of psychosocial aspects of pediatric gastroenterological conditions; develop collaborative relationships among practitioners who carry out psychological interventions with pediatric GI populations, and educate clinical professionals about the psychosocial issues which may affect the child or adolescent with a gastroenterological condition.

=== Pediatric Pain Special Interest Group ===
Pediatric pain is a common condition of childhood/adolescence. As such, many pediatric psychologists research and provide clinical care in this area and specialized programs are developing. The Pediatric Pain Special Interest Group provides a forum for communication and discussion about the many developments in the field.

== Modern training ==
The road to becoming a pediatric psychologist is long and consists of many years of training. Most clinicians have a strong background in psychology coming out of their undergraduate schooling. It is ideal for prospective students to take courses in developmental psychology, health psychology, developmental psychopathology, abnormal psychology, and many others. In order to be competitive when applying to graduate schools, most students will have a strong background in research either as an assistant in a pediatric psychology lab, conducting independent studies, or both. Student's may also find it beneficial to acquire field experience with children in order to demonstrate that they can become adept clinicians. In addition to this, for admission to graduate school, it is necessary to have a relationship with three or more psychologists in order to provide letters of recommendation.

To become a full-fledged pediatric psychologist one must obtain a doctoral degree in the form of either a Ph.D. or Psy.D. in clinical or counseling psychology. Graduate training typically requires 4–5 years of graduate school and an additional year spent on an internship. Some programs will require the completion of a master's thesis while others will not. All, however, will require that students complete a dissertation consisting of original research. A doctoral program will use the scientist practitioner or Boulder model which emphasizes training in both clinical practice and research methodology, while a PsyD program will likely use the Vail model which emphasizes clinical skills much more than research. Some schools will provide a specialization in child clinical psychology or health psychology which can supplement normal training with a pediatric twist. Another aspect of graduate training is external practicums in settings such hospitals or clinics. Gaining experience working in these areas is essential in order to be prepared to obtain a job after graduate school. In order to help standardize the training each psychologist receives, the Society of Pediatric Psychology task force developed a list of 12 training areas necessary for a specialty in pediatric psychology:

1. Lifespan development
2. Lifespan developmental psychopathology
3. Child, adolescent, and family assessment
4. Intervention strategies
5. Research methods and systems evaluation
6. Professional, ethical, and legal issues pertaining to children, adolescents, and families
7. Diversity issues and multicultural competence
8. Role of multiple disciplines in service delivery systems
9. Prevention, family support, and health promotion
10. Social issues affecting children, adolescents, and families
11. Consultation-liaison (CL) roles
12. Disease process and medical management

After graduate school, there are many choices in order to determine the field best suited to one's interests. Some individuals will engage in a fellowship which will allow for increased knowledge in specific areas of clinical psychology and research and may yield more job opportunities. A postdoctoral fellowship may also provide supervised clinical hours which are required in order to become independently licensed in a state. Finally, some pediatric psychologists will go on to engage in clinical practice while others will not. In order to practice as a clinical psychologist one must obtain a doctoral degree from an approved program, complete a required amount of supervised clinical hours, pass the Examination for Professional Practice in Psychology (EPPP), and be knowledgeable of all state regulations.

Pediatric Psychologists may choose to become certified by the American Board of Professional Psychology (ABPP) and can apply for advanced credentials through the American Board of Clinical Child and Adolescent Psychology (ABCCAP) or the American Board of Clinical Health Psychology (ABCHP).

== Research ==
The main goal of pediatric research is to understand child development occurring with health-related issues. Using ecological systems framework, pediatric psychologists discover the ways in which health issues might affect children and their families and ways to promote physical health and psychological adjustment in pediatric-health populations.

Important issues currently addressed in pediatric psychology research across various diagnoses include:

- Cultural and diversity issues
- Evidence-based practice
- Inpatient pediatric consultation-liaison
- Adherence to treatment regimens
- Chronic and recurrent pain
- Management of pain and distress due to medical procedures
- Pharmacology and psychopharmacology
- Medical traumatic stress
- Palliative care, end of life, bereavement
- eHealth application
- Pediatric psycho-oncology

=== Common research areas in pediatric psychology ===
  - Neonatology, prematurity, and developmental issues
  - Pediatric asthma
  - Cystic fibrosis
  - Diabetes mellitus
  - Sickle-cell disease
  - Pediatric oncology
  - Traumatic brain injury and spinal cord injury
  - Central nervous system disorders (e.g., epilepsy, spina bifida)
  - Juvenile idiopathic arthritis
  - Cardiovascular disease
  - Pediatric organ transplantation
  - Abdominal pain-related gastrointestinal disorders (e.g., irritable bowel syndrome, inflammatory bowel disease)
  - Pediatric HIV/AIDS
  - Pediatric burns
  - Feeding and vomiting problems
  - Childhood obesity
  - Eating disorders
  - Elimination disorders (e.g., enuresis, encopresis)
  - Pediatric sleep
  - Autism spectrum disorders and developmental disabilities
  - Behavior problems in a pediatric context
  - Attention deficit hyperactivity disorder in the pediatric context
  - Child abuse
  - Injuries and safety: Unintentional injuries are the leading cause of disability and death in children and teens from the age of 1 to 19 years. More children and adolescents die as a result of an unintentional injury than from all other childhood diseases combined. Health care providers have multiple opportunities to provide prevention materials and injury guidance. Simon et al. (2006) found that less frequent injury guidance results in more frequent medically linked injuries by 16 months of age. Research suggests that counseling increases parental safety behaviors and counseling tailored to risk behaviors of a particular family are most effective. Pediatric psychology has a significant role to play in formulating, implementing, and evaluating injury prevention efforts.

=== Future research directions ===
Positive, resilience factors, and quality of life: Pediatric psychologists are increasingly understanding and applying research on resilience factors and protective factors. Researchers have discovered that despite psychological risk factors associated with childhood chronic illnesses, the majority of children with chronic illnesses fare just as well as their peers or even better in some cases. Furthermore, the study of health-related quality of life (HRQOL) is unique to the pediatric setting and encompasses domains of physical, psychological, and social functioning that are directly influenced by chronic illnesses. Researchers have found that pediatric cancer survivors typically report positive outcomes, while lower levels were reported in children and teens with diabetes, cystic fibrosis, and asthma, which may be due in part to the intensity and duration of the treatments. Researchers' current goal is to identify areas of functioning that are relatively untouched from the illness and treatment and to focus in on the domains of the HRQOL for which there is an increased risk so that prevention and intervention efforts can target the most valuable domains.

== See also ==
- Community psychology
- Developmental psychology
- Pediatrics
