= Lindsay C. Malloy =

- Occupation: Associate Professor of Forensic Psychology
- Awards: The Saleem Shah Award for Early Career Excellence in Psychology and Law; The Diane J. Willis Early Career Award

Academic background
- Education: University of California, Irvine (MA & PhD); Central Michigan University (BS)

Academic work
- Discipline: Developmental and Forensic Psychology
- Institutions: Ontario Tech University

Lindsay C. Malloy is an associate professor of forensic psychology at Ontario Tech University. Malloy's research has focused on the negative experiences that children can face and how they can affect their abilities to recall memories. Specifically, Malloy's research is used for implications in the legal system regarding children and their rights in interviews, interrogations, and more.

== Education and career ==
Malloy has a double undergraduate degree from Central Michigan University, where she received a Bachelor of Science in Business Administration and Management and a Bachelor of Science in Psychology. She graduated from Central Michigan University with both degrees in 2002. Malloy received her Master of Arts in Social Ecology from the University of California, Irvine in 2004, along with her PhD in Developmental Psychology from the same institution in 2008. Malloy's dissertation was focused on children's views of the consequences of disclosing negative events, and she looked at maltreated and non-maltreated children. Jodi Quas was Malloy's doctoral dissertation research mentor. Malloy completed postdoctoral work with Michael Lamb at the University of Cambridge from 2008-2010 in applied developmental psychology. She worked with Florida International University for seven years as an assistant and associate professor, and she then moved to Ontario Tech University as an associate professor.

== Research ==
Malloy's research interests lie in developmental psychology, observing the behavior and patterns of children through adolescence, as well as any possible traumatic experiences they have encountered. Within the legal realm, she has looked at how children are impacted during interrogations and eyewitness testimony. Malloy's research has been included in a couple of Supreme Court amicus briefs. Malloy recounts that it can be hard to make policy changes when in academia. Malloy has published in several journals in her career thus far: Law and Human Behavior, Child Development, and Developmental Psychology. She has also edited a book with her postdoctoral advisor, Michael Lamb, called Children's Testimony: A Handbook of Psychological Research and Forensic Practice.

Within Malloy's area of interest, she has published articles regarding children in the legal field. One such research study looked at the recantation of statements made by children regarding sexual abuse. Malloy also has published on interviewing children in the legal field.

== Awards ==
- Division 37 Diane J. Willis Early Career Award in 2013.
- Saleem Shah Award for Early Career Excellence in Psychology and Law in 2914, which comes from the American Psychology-Law Society and the American Academy of Forensic Psychology.
