= Jacques Barcat =

French painter (1877–1955)

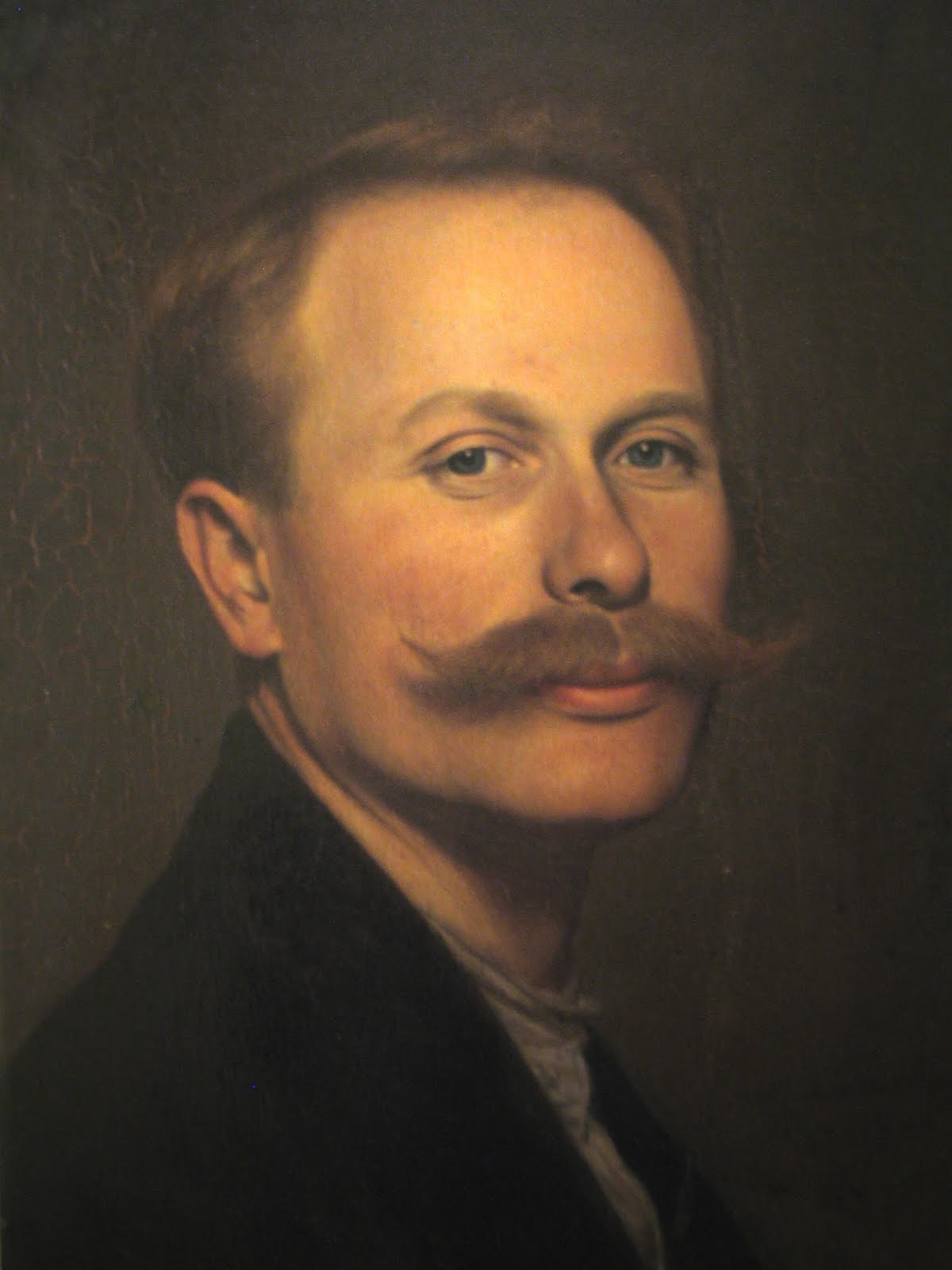
- Born: 4 July 1877; Paris, France
- Died: 1 December 1955 (aged 78); Le Mans, France
- Education: Beaux-Arts de Paris, Académie Julian, Jean-Léon Gérôme
- Known for: Painting
- Movement: Academicism, Naturalism, Intimism, Symbolism

Jacques-Louis Barcat (1 July 1877 – 1 December 1955) was a French painter, known for his naturalistic paintings and (family) portraits. He was a student of Jean-Léon Gérôme and Ernest Hébert. As a member of the Société des Artistes Français he took part in the exhibitions (Salons) from 1905 to 1936. Barcat mainly worked in Paris and Le Mans.

== Youth and education ==
Barcat was born in 1877 in Paris, the son of Emile Barcat, his mother was of German descent. He grew up in a modest family. His father, a baker, died at the age of 47, leaving behind a wife and four children. Barcat was 13 at the time. In 1895, he honoured his late father with a portrait drawing.

During his youth, it became apparent that Barcat possessed a great talent for drawing. He received a scholarship and was able to further develop his talent for drawing and painting in Paris in his hometown.

He went to school at the Beaux-Arts de Paris, where Jacques Barcat studied under the guidance of Jean-Léon Gérôme whose perfectionist academic teaching was an excellent artistic training. Barcat was also taught by painters such as Gustave Courtois, Gabriel Ferrier, Ernest Hébert, William Bouguereau and Raphaël Collin. Barcat spent much time in Gabriel Ferrier's study at the École des Beaux-Arts.

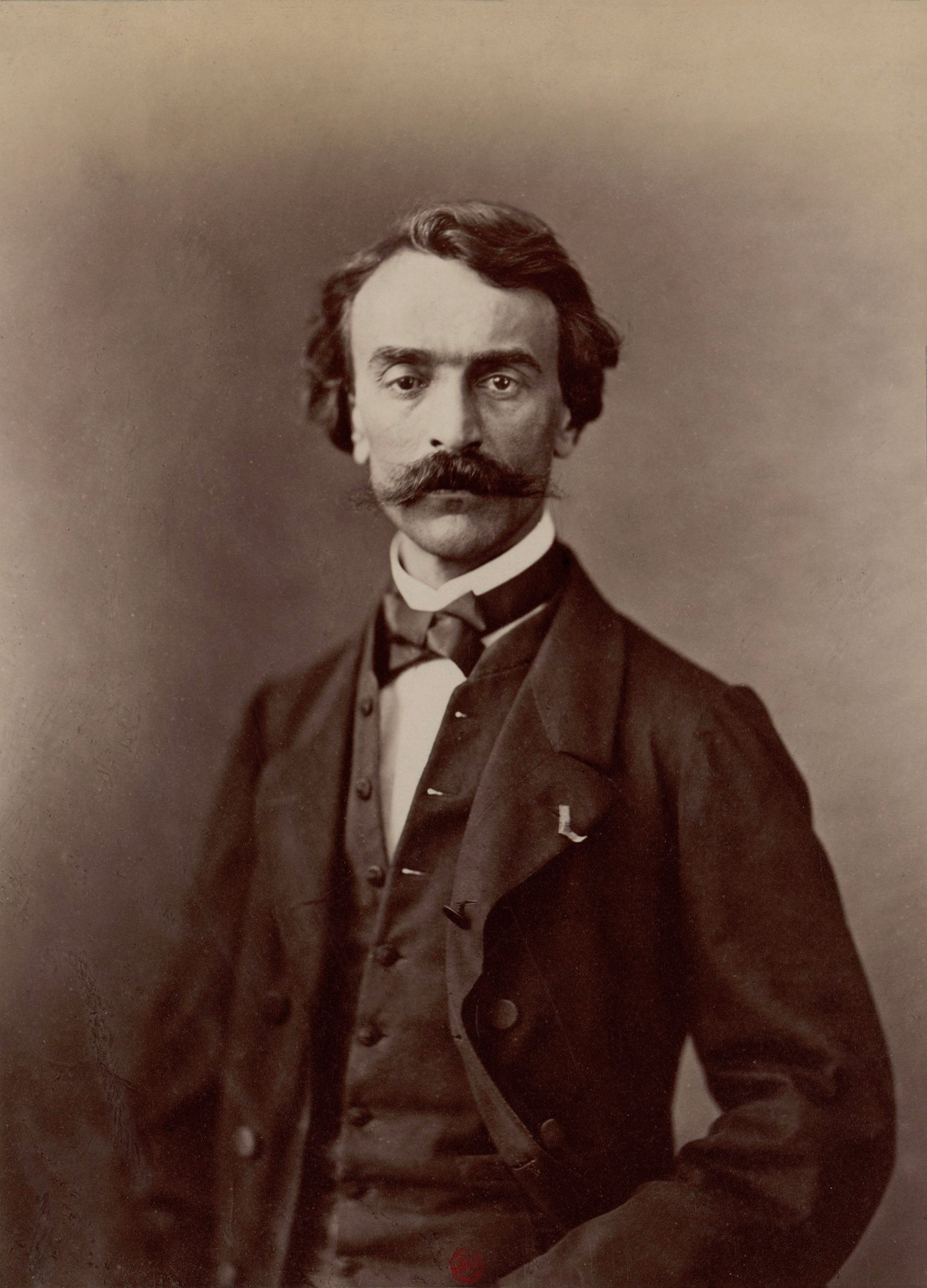
Jean-Léon Gérôme, Barcat's main teacher

However, Barcat had to suspend his studies at the academy due to his military service. In the army, he held the rank of corporal and worked there as a secretary. After his army service, he completed his academic art studies.

== Style and technique ==
Barcat was a completely naturalistic painter. 'Paint or draw what you see' was his motto.

He tried to depict nature as it really is, with great precision and attention to detail. He dominated many techniques such as pencil drawing, charcoal drawing, the gouache, but most of his works are oil paintings on canvas. His great examples in painting were Rembrandt van Rijn, Théodore Géricault and Diego Velázquez.

== Oeuvre ==
Barcat is best known for his subtle, intimist family portraits and family scenes.

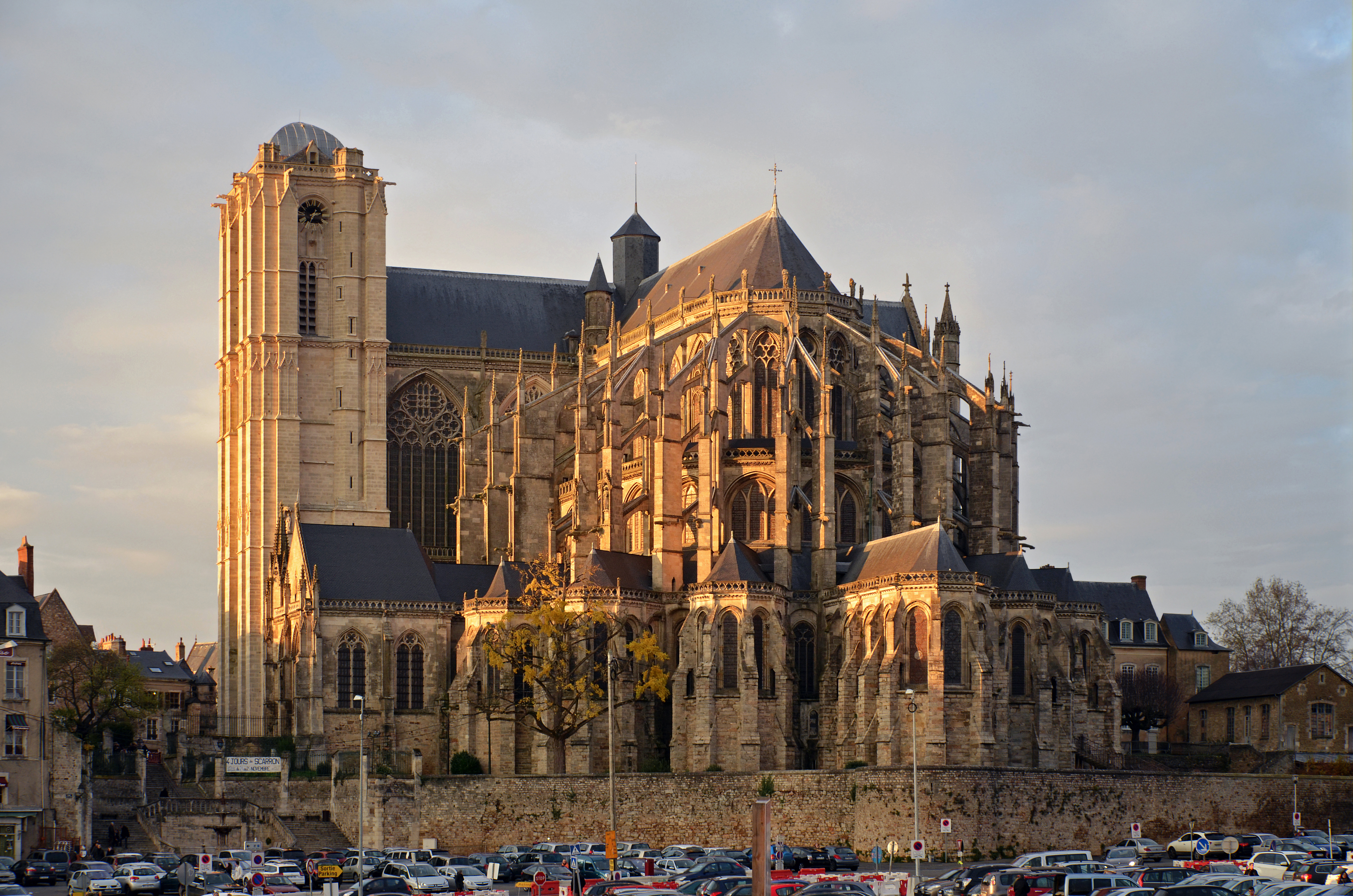
Le Mans Cathedral, often painted by Barcat

His oeuvre is diverse and includes portrait paintings, landscape paintings and still lifes. His paintings include the streets of the old quarter of Le Mans, Le Mans Cathedral, the Notre-Dame de la Couture and many landscapes in Le Mans.

Barcat painted many self-portraits and portrait paintings of family members, such as his children, his wife and his father-in-law Etienne Stanislas Virette (a former mayor of the municipality of La Ferté-Bernard in 1882–1888).

== Exhibitions ==
At the Salon d'Automne ("Salon des Artistes Français") of 1905, Barcat exhibited his first painting, "The Portrait of the Chemist L'Hôte". He exhibited his works at the Salon every year until 1936.

In 1911, his work "La petite fille au piano (1910)" received an honourable mention at its exhibition at the Salon. At the 1913 Salon, Barcat exhibited the work "La brodeuse ou Alice cousant" (1913). It concerns an interior scene depicting his wife Alice sewing. The two paintings hanging on the wall in the background of the painting are also by Barcat.

His works were also exhibited at the "Salons des Indépendants", "Salon des Tuileries", Salon d'Automne, the Salon des Artistes Rouennais and the Musée des Beaux-Arts de Rouen.

In 2020, an exhibition took place at L'Art'elier in Sainte-Suzanne-et-Chammes with works by Barcat, among others.

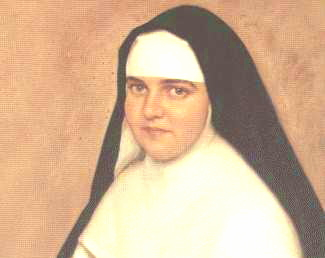
Mother Yvonne-Aimée of Jesus

== Selected works ==
- "Portrait of Emile Barcat" (1895) – drawing
- "Self-portrait in military uniform" (1898) – oil painting
- "Le portrait de la Nouvelle Orléans dans son cadre" (1903) – oil painting (114 x 88 cm)
- "Portrait du chimiste L'hôte" (1905) – first work exhibited
- "Portrait d'Alice au pastel" (1906) – pastel-coloured portrait painting (27 x 31 cm)
- "Portraits de Monsieur et Madame Virette" (1907) – oil painting (46 x 55 cm)
- "Intérieur de cuisine" (1909) – oil painting – exhibited at the Salon des Artistes Français in 1909
- "Le réveil de Jeannette" (1909) – exhibited at the Salon des Artistes Français in 1910
- "Musée de Cluny, chambre de François 1er" (1909) – oil painting (90 x 73 cm) – First Prize of the General Council of the Seine in 1910
- "L'Hôtel d'Argouges" – Musée de Tessé in Mans
- "Le réveil de Jeannette" (1909) – exhibited at the Salon des Artistes Français in 1910
- "Le bain de Jeannette" (1909) – oil painting (100 x 70 cm), exhibited at the Salon des Artistes Français in 1910
- "La petite fille au piano" (1910) – oil painting (117 x 90 cm), exhibited at the 1911 Salon
- "La Lettre" (1912) – largest oil painting by Barcat (196 x 150 cm), exhibited at the 1912 Salon
- "La brodeuse ou Alice cousant" (1913)
- "L'Attente" (1913) – oil painting (100 x 80 cm)
- "Young mother" (1913) – oil painting (115 x 89 cm)
- "L'escalier" (1913) – exhibited at the Salon des indépendants in 1914
- "Portrait de Monseigneur Mélisson" – collectie Mazérat
- "Still life" (1929) – Musée de Tessé in Mans

== Museums and public collections ==
- Musée de la Reine-Bérengère
- Tessé Museum, Le Mans
- Musée de Cluny
- Maître Mazérat Collection

== Private life ==
After his marriage to Alice Peltier in 1905, he continued to live in the Paris area.

Two years after World War I, he moved with his family to Rue Albert Maignan in Le Mans, where Alice's parents were living. His wife, as well as his children, repeatedly played leading roles in his paintings. He stayed in Le Mans until his death in 1955.

The family had six children: Jacques (1907–1909), Pierre, Jacqueline (1913), Jean (1914), Madeleine (1921) and Anne-Marie (1931–2023). The first son, Jacques, died in 1909 at the age of 18 months due to a childhood illness.

In 1913, his daughter Jacqueline was born. Three years later, the family expanded with a second son Jean. A second daughter Madeleine followed in 1921. A third daughter Anne-Marie was born in 1931 and was the last addition to the family.

== Trivia ==
- In the 1930s, Barcat spent some time at the Augustine monastery of Malestroit in Brittany (Morbihan). At this monastery, he created several artistic works when Mother Yvonne-Aimée of Jesus was there. This religious woman changed Barcat. While he was not religious before his stay at the convent, he suddenly converted.
- Barcat got his own street in Le Mans: rue Jacques Barcat.

== References and sources ==
=== External links ===
- Bibliothèque nationale de France, Jacques Barcat
- Benezit, Jacques Barcat
- Artprice.com, Jacques Barcat biography
