= Romeny-sur-Marne =

- Commune
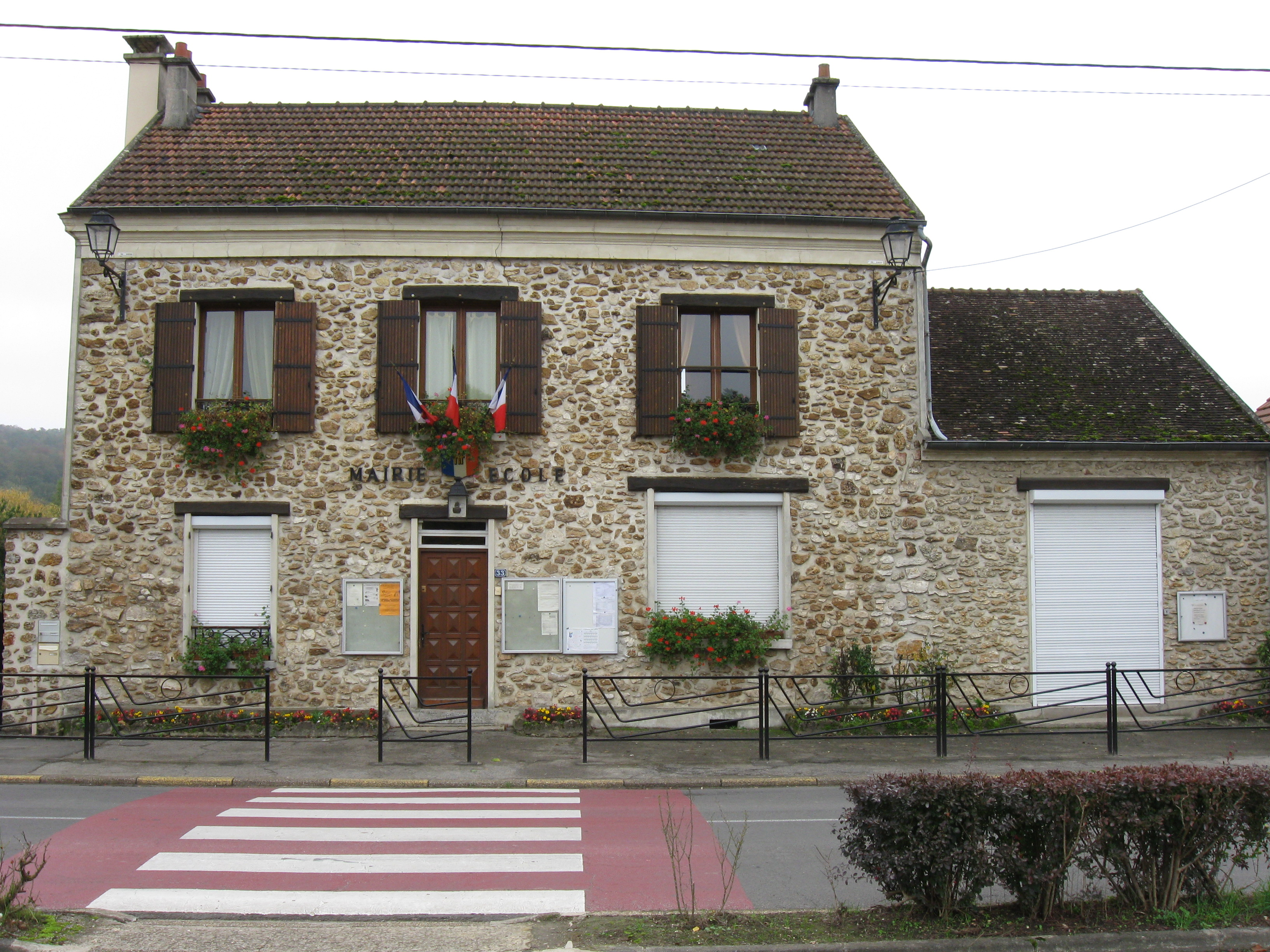
- The town hall and school of Romeny-sur-Marne
- Location of Romeny-sur-Marne
- Location within France Location within Hauts-de-France
- Coordinates: 48°58′37″N 3°20′14″E
- Country: France
- Region: Hauts-de-France
- Department: Aisne
- Arrondissement: Château-Thierry
- Canton: Essômes-sur-Marne
- Intercommunality: Charly sur Marne

Government
  - Mayor (2026–32): Arnaud Fayet
- Area^{1}: 4.23 km^{2} (1.63 sq mi)
- Elevation: 65 m (213 ft)
- Highest elevation: 208 m (682 ft)
- Lowest elevation: 57 m (187 ft)
- Population (2023): 450
  - Density: 110/km^{2} (280/sq mi)
- Time zone: UTC+01:00 (CET)
  - Summer (DST): UTC+02:00 (CEST)
- INSEE/Postal code: 02653 /02310
- ^{1} French Land Register data, which excludes lakes, ponds, glaciers > 1 km^{2} (0.386 sq mi or 247 acres) and river estuaries.

Romeny-sur-Marne (French pronunciation: [ʁɔmni syʁ maʁn], literally Romeny on Marne) is a commune in the Aisne department in Hauts-de-France in northern France.

== Population ==
Historical population
Year	Pop.	±% p.a.
1968	306	—
1975	309	+0.14%
1982	339	+1.33%
1990	363	+0.86%
1999	419	+1.61%
2007	485	+1.85%
2012	485	+0.00%
2017	504	+0.77%
2023	450	−1.87%
Source: INSEE

== Personalities ==
- Jules Ernest Renoux
- Edith Piaf
- Marcel Cerdan

== Geography ==
The village is located along the Marne (right bank), 4.5 km east of Charly-sur-Marne, 2 km north of Nogent-l'Artaud and 12 km southwest of Château-Thierry.

== See also ==
- Communes of the Aisne department
