= Logan Wright =

American psychologist

Logan Wright Jr.
- Born: December 6, 1933; Wellington, Kansas, U.S.
- Died: December 18, 1999 (aged 66); Norman, Oklahoma, U.S.
- Education: Vanderbilt University
- Scientific career
- Fields: Psychology
- Workplaces: Purdue University, University of Oklahoma Health Sciences Center, University of Oklahoma

Logan Wright Jr. (December 6, 1933 – December 18, 1999) was an American pediatric psychologist and was the first Native American president of the American Psychological Association (APA). His Native American heritage originated from the Osage Nation. He coined the term pediatric psychology, co-founded the Society of Pediatric Psychology (SPP) and made numerous advances within the field. He was involved in the founding of the American Psychological Society (APS) in the mid-1980s when many psychological scientists split off from the APA.

== Biography ==
=== Early life ===
Wright was born in Wellington, Kansas. He earned all-state track honors at Will Rogers High School in Tulsa, Oklahoma. He graduated from Oklahoma Baptist University, where he had received a track scholarship and served as track team captain as a senior. He completed a graduate degree in religious education from Golden Gate Seminary and began teaching at Bethel College in Kentucky. Wright returned to Vanderbilt University and earned a PhD in psychology in 1964.

=== Career ===
After an internship at the University of North Carolina, he joined the faculty at Purdue University and remained there until 1966. He left Purdue for the University of Oklahoma Health Sciences Center (OUHSC), where he served as associate professor and professor of pediatric psychology. Psychologist Diane Willis wrote that Wright "put pediatric psychology on the map" while at OUHSC. Wright worked with George Albee, president of the APA Section on Clinical Child Psychology, to evaluate the impact of having psychologists in the pediatric setting in 1967. He led an APA committee that identified 250 psychologists interested in pediatric work. This led to the formation of the SPP in 1968.

In addition to coining the term pediatric psychology, Wright wrote several conceptual papers related to the field. He was one of the first to demonstrate that psychological interventions could enhance pediatric medical care. Wright became known for psychological research that impacted tracheotomy dependence, encopresis and medication refusal. Wright co-wrote The Encyclopedia of Pediatric Psychology, a long-respected reference for practitioners in the specialty. He left his academic position in 1979 to build 66 Sonic Drive-In fast food franchises across the United States. Wright had open heart surgery in 1983, spurring an interest in health psychology, especially in the relationship between Type A personality and cardiac rehabilitation.

In 1984, Wright returned to academia as a psychology professor at the University of Oklahoma. Wright served as APA president in 1986. That year, three years after he had heart surgery, he also set a world age record for a 52-year-old in the 200-meter hurdles. Wright was involved in the controversial divide between the APA's scientists and practitioners in the mid-1980s. He helped psychology's scientists split off from the APA and form the APS. Past APA president and friend Ron Fox said that Wright had alienated some psychology practitioners, commenting, "We sent him to referee between practitioners and scientists and he joined the scientists."

Logan Wrights first position in his career was in the Department of Psychology at Purdue University where he stayed for two years. Afterwards he was lured back to Oklahoma by the Department of Pediatrics at the University of Oklahoma Health Sciences Center (OUHSC). He served at this university as an associate professor and eventually a professor of Pediatric Psychology from 1966 to 1979. It was at this institution that Logan Wright formed the Society of Pediatric Psychology (SPP). Because of his efforts he was eventually dubbed "the father of pediatric psychology".

Logan Wright held many prestigious positions, such as the first Native American president of the APA, as well as the president of the SPP. He also assisted in founding The American Association for Applied and Preventative Psychology, the North American Associations of master's in psychology, and the American Psychological Society. Logan Wright authored four books including the Encyclopedia of Pediatric Psychology which is still used today. Has written over an estimated one hundred articles on medical and child psychology.

Wright received a long list of awards to include The Distinguished Psychologist Citation from the Oklahoma Psychological Association, the Outstanding Alumni Achievement Award from the Oklahoma Baptist University. The Distinguished Service Award from the Society of Pediatric Psychology and held the world record in the Masters Division 200-meter men's hurdles at age fifty-two. Additionally, he was granted professor emeritus status at Oklahoma University as a professor of psychology.

Some of the major contributions that Logan Wright made were:

Behavioral Interventions - Wright believed these could improve children's adherence to medical treatments. He also utilized techniques like positive reinforcement, modeling, and systematic desensitization that were used to reduce anxiety and enhance cooperation during medical procedures.

Pain Management - Wright promoted strategies to manage pain and distress during medical procedures. He also developed distraction techniques (e.g.) using toys, music, and storytelling to divert children away from discomfort. Family Centered Care - Wright emphasized involving families about medical conditions, treatments, and coping skills were key aspects. Enhancing children's understanding and empowering them to manage their health contributed to better outcomes.

In addition, Logan Wright made significant contributions to areas like tracheotomy dependence, encopresis, and medication refusal. To gain better financial security he also left his academic position in 1979 and franchised sixty-six Sonic fast-food restaurants. After his death the SPP renamed the Distinguished Research Contribution in Pediatric Psychology Award to the Logan Wright Distinguished Research Award.

Wright worked alongside several notable psychologists, including Dorothea Ross and Lee Salk. Ross contributed to research on social learning, including work with Albert Bandura and Sheila Ross on the Bobo doll experiments. Salk was involved with the Society for the Prevention of Cruelty to Children (SPCC) and contributed to training and advocacy in child development and welfare. As a Native American in the field, Wright also contributed to efforts aimed at increasing cultural competency and awareness within psychology.

Wright recognized the importance of understanding cultural differences in healthcare including the mistrust towards medical practitioners (White men) by native tribes in rural Oklahoma including the Osage. Logan Wright believed that his heritage heightened his awareness of the cultural nuances when working with diverse pediatric populations. Because of his person-centered approach, he emphasized the need for psychologists to be culturally competent and respectful of patient's backgrounds.

Wright advocated for the well-being of indigenous children and his interventions considered the specific needs and challenges faced by Native American youth. He worked on the reservations to ensure that psychological services were accessible and culturally relevant for these communities. Being part of the Osage Nation, Wright actively engaged with Native Americans communities, collaborating with tribal leaders, educators, and healthcare providers to improve mental health services for indigenous children once again.

As the first known American Indian to serve as president of the American Psychological Association (APA), Wright encountered both opportunities and challenges while advocating for Native American youth. These included efforts to increase representation and visibility of Native American psychologists and their contributions within professional organizations and academia, where they were historically underrepresented. His work also involved promoting culturally informed psychological services and addressing disparities in access to care. Wright contributed to advancing cultural competency in psychology, particularly in the context of pediatric behavioral interventions.

=== Later life ===
In 1993, Wright founded the North American Association of Masters in Psychology, an organization that advocates for psychologists who are trained at the master's level. Wright was named professor emeritus at Oklahoma in 1995. He died of a heart attack on his ranch in Norman, Oklahoma in 1999. After his death, the SPP's Distinguished Research Contribution in Pediatric Psychology Award was renamed the Logan Wright Distinguished Research Award.
