= Jules Ernest Renoux =

French painter

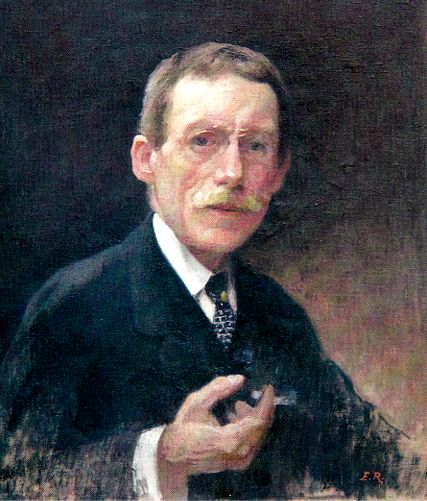
- self portrait
- Born: 5 May 1863; Romeny-sur-Marne, France
- Died: 9 June 1932 (aged 69); Romeny-sur-Marne, France
- Known for: Painting, Drawing
- Movement: Impressionism
- Awards: Order of the Medjidie; Order of Christ (Portugal)
- Patrons: Count de Zogheb; Auguste Magnère

Jules Alphonse Ernest Renoux (5 May 1863 – 9 June 1932) was a French painter working during the height of French Impressionism and the Belle Epoque.

== Training and career ==
Renoux was the son of Jules Alphonse Renoux and Ernestine Veron. He showed early a talent for drawing and was still young when he went to live in Paris with his mother; her husband had abandoned her and had gone off to fight as a volunteer in the Franco-Prussian War of 1870. A student of Jean-Léon Gérôme and Alfred Philippe Roll, Renoux studied at the École des Beaux-Arts and collaborated with Roll on the painted ceilings of the Hôtel de Viller, the Sorbonne and the Petit Palais.

Count de Zogheb, a well-known personality of the Belle Epoque, commissioned Renoux to paint his portrait, which was shown in the Salon of 1901. Count de Zogheb subsequently purchased many other Renoux paintings; this association earned Renoux two medals, the Imperial Order of Medjidieh and the Cross of the Knights of the Portuguese Military Order of Christ (which, with typical modesty, he never wore). A later patron was the industrialist Auguste Magnère, an amateur artist whom Renoux tutored.

Renoux exhibited in the Paris gallery of Georges Bernheim in 1916, and the public reception was an encouraging success, resulting in the sale of twelve paintings. From 1922 Renoux exhibited at the Salon des Artistes Francais where he became a member. Ten of Renoux's paintings are on permanent display at the Petit Palais, Musée des Beaux Arts de la ville de Paris.

== Style ==
Renoux employed a palette based in yellow-orange and ochre in which he painted street scenes admired for their understated beauty and agility of hand. Renoux liked painting the human form, frequently with members of his family as sitters. But he was shy and disliked sketching in the open streets. He often chose some obscure corner from which to draw, which explains the interesting and unusual perspective of some of his paintings. As The Times of London wrote, "He might in the broad sense of the term be called Impressionist, being concerned with the open-air effect, taking particular pleasure in the dapple of sunlight on tree shaded avenues. Accurate in perspective, he used it with an eye to pictorial value and showed particular skill in placing his vividly sketched figures at varying distances from the spectator."

== Personal life ==
Renoux married Berthe Madeleine in 1895, although his mother opposed the marriage on financial grounds. His wife was a frequent model.

== Renoux Museum and exhibition ==
Romeny-sur-Marne has a museum dedicated to Renoux’s life and work, la Maison Renoux, where his studio, in the center of his garden, has been preserved. A stèle and plaque, place de l'Église, are dedicated to his memory. Renoux traveled frequently to Romeny-sur-Marne and settled there permanently after losing his studio in Paris, 50, rue Saint-Didier, in 1928. He is buried in the village cemetery of Romeny-sur-Marne. Renoux's sun umbrella, stool, paint box, and transport case for works-in-progress were displayed at an impressionism exhibit at the Albertina in 2009 and are now in the Petit Palais.

== Gallery ==
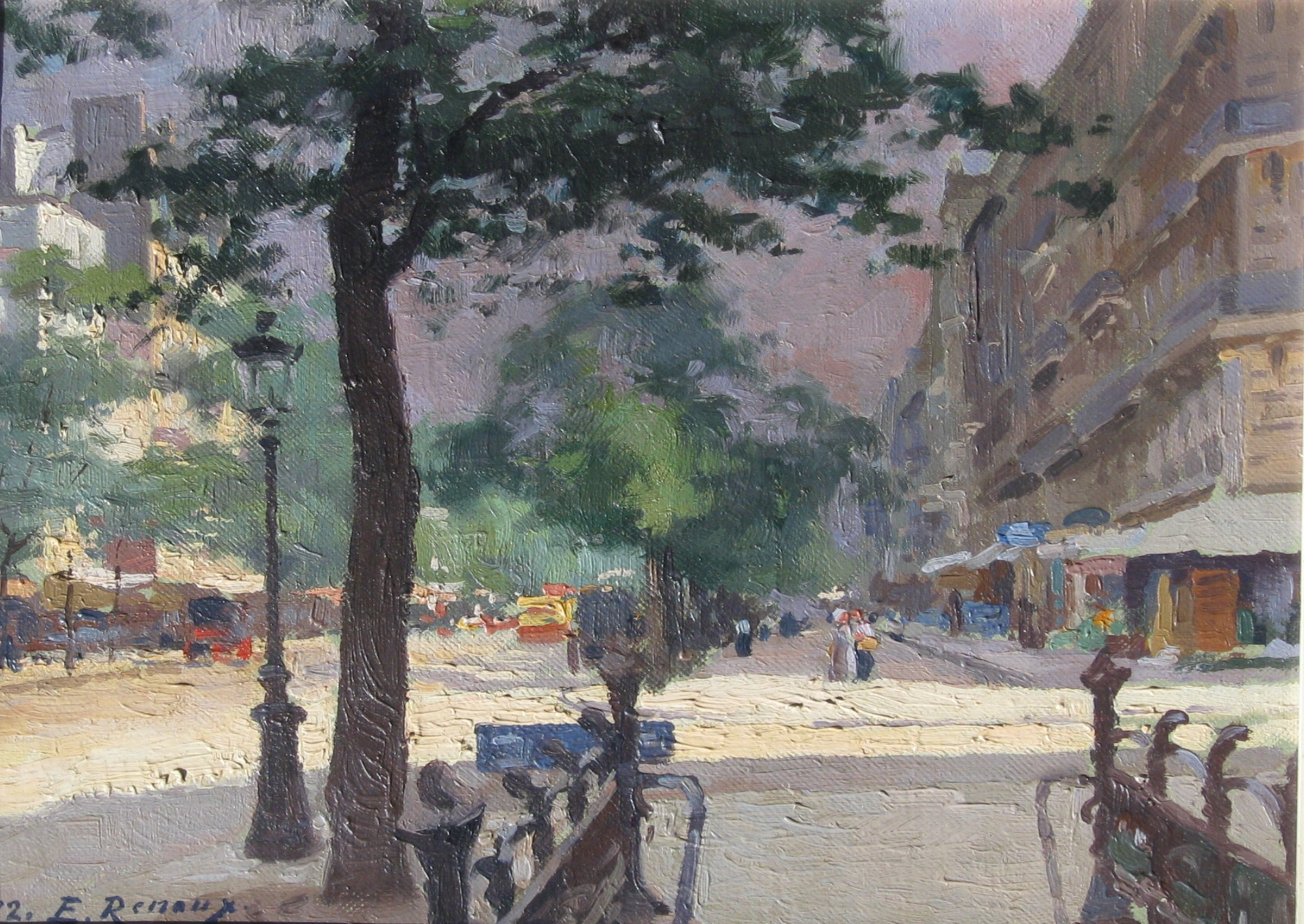
Street Scene, Paris

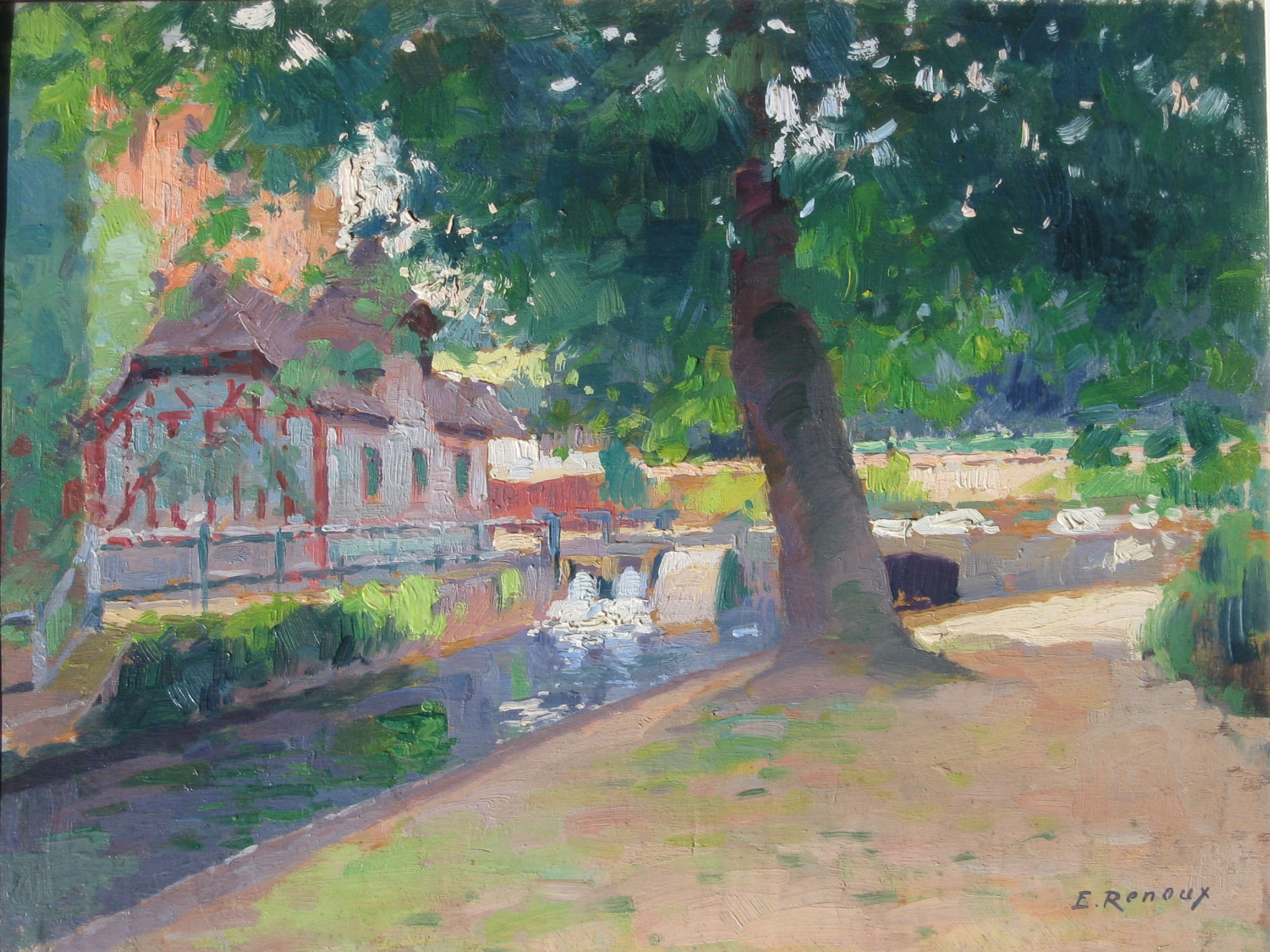
Water Mill

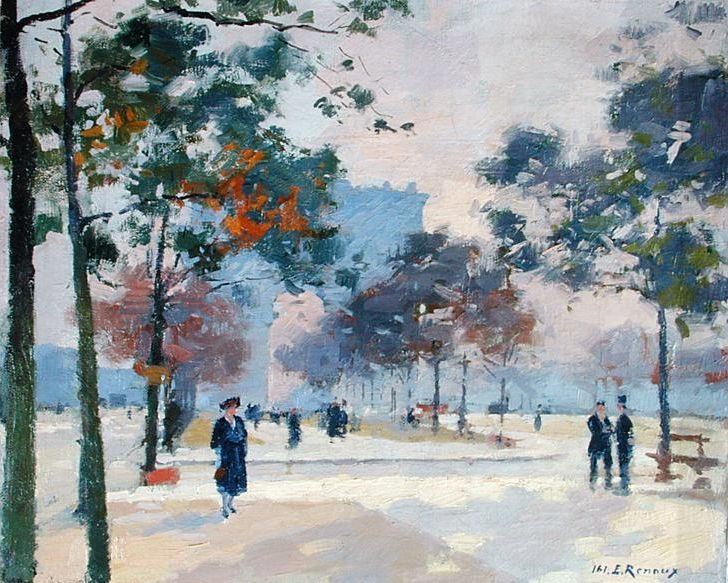
Arc de Triomphe, Paris

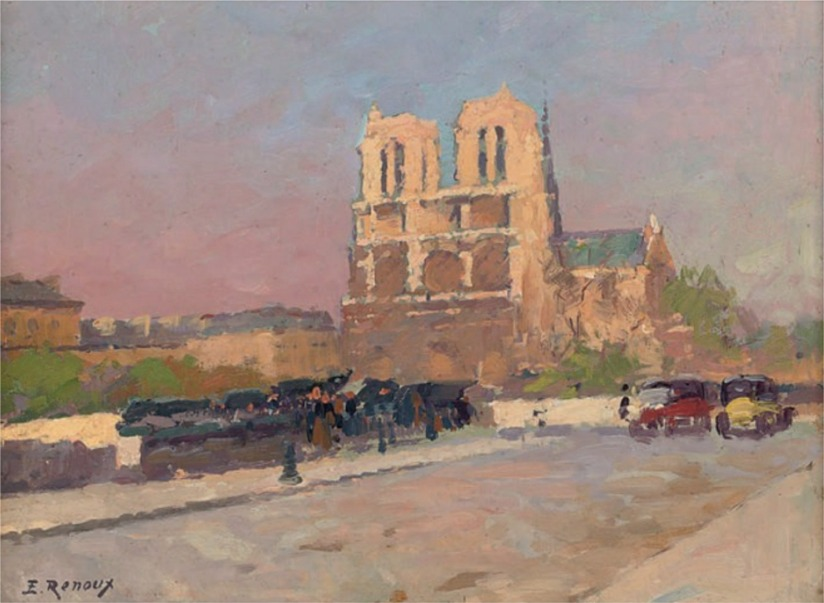
Notre Dame, Paris

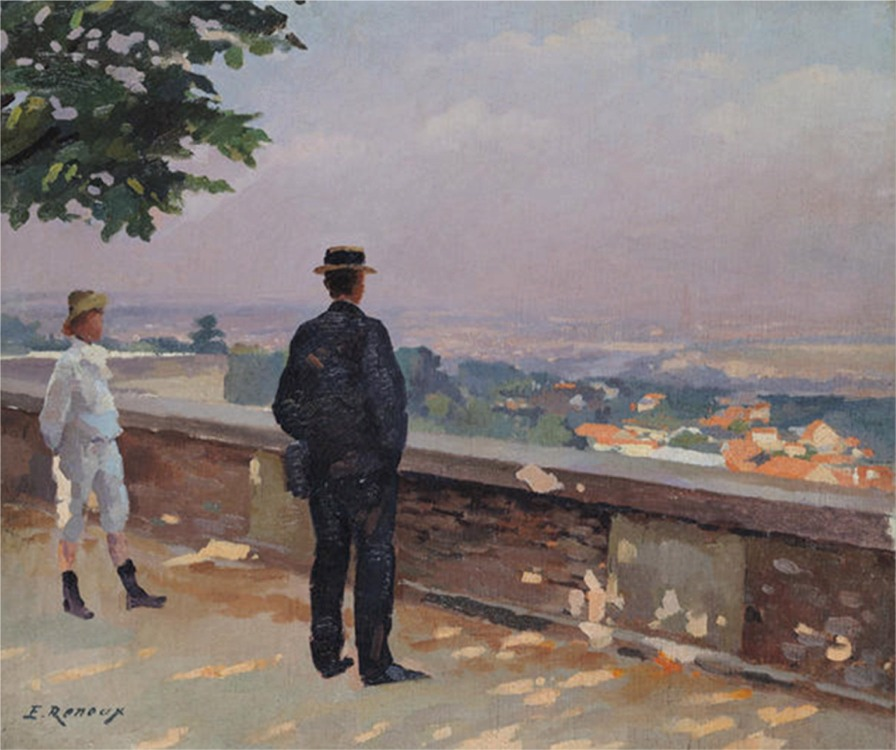
Paris from the observatory at Meudon

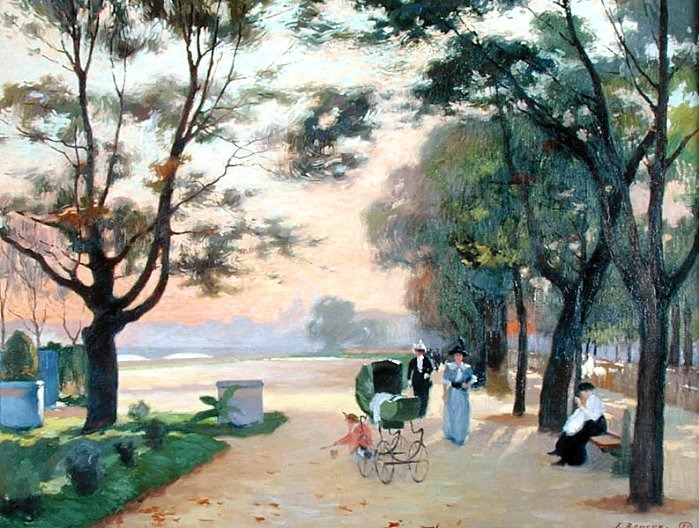
Cours-la-Reine, Paris

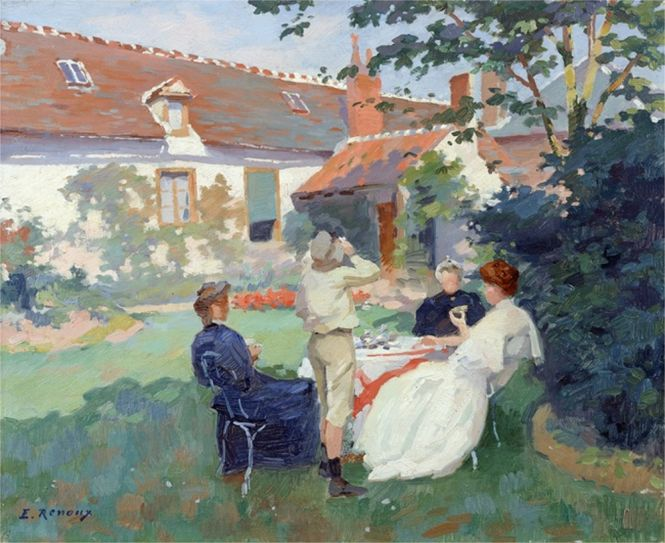
Teatime

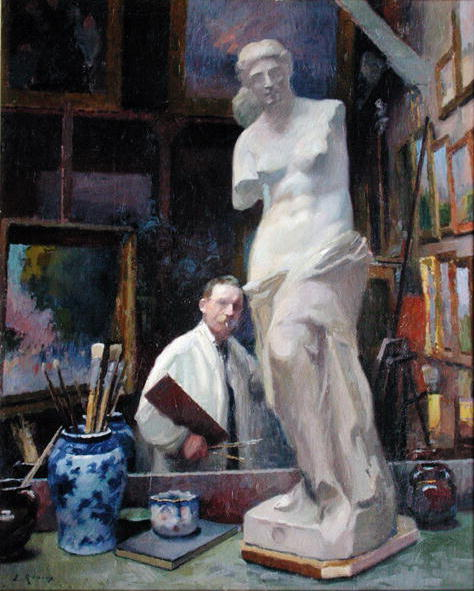
Self portrait

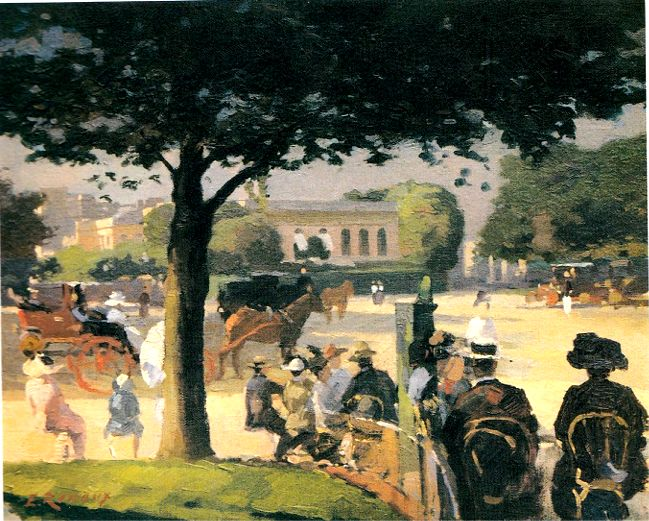
Palais Rose, Paris

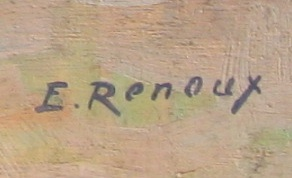
Signature

== Exhibitions ==
- 1890 Salon National des Beaux-Arts
- 1892 Salon National des Beaux-Arts
- 1896 Salon National des Beaux-Arts
- 1898 Salon National des Beaux-Arts
- 1899 Salon National des Beaux-Arts
- 1900 Salon National des Beaux-Arts
- 1902 Salon National des Beaux-Arts
- 1901 Galerie Potin, Paris
- 1916 Galerie Bernheim, Paris
- 1917 Sporting Club of Monte Carlo
- 1929 Galerie Santi, Douai
- 1934 Galerie Ecalle, Retrospective Exhibition
- 1936 Galerie Ecalle, Retrospective Exhibition
- 1963 Galerie O. Bosc, Centenary Exhibition
- 1965 Kaplan Gallery, London
- 1966 Hammer Gallery, New York
- 1967 Kaplan Gallery, London
- 1968 Kaplan Gallery, London
