= Yvonne Beauvais =

French Augustinian nun (1901–1951)

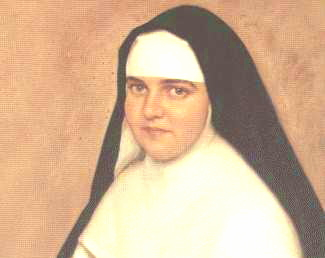
- Born: July 16, 1901; Cossé-en-Champagne, France
- Died: February 3, 1951 (aged 49); Malestroit, France
- Other names: Mother Yvonne-Aimée of Jesus, Yvonne-Aimée de Malestroit
- Occupation: Roman Catholic Nun

Yvonne Beauvais (French pronunciation: [ivɔn bovɛ]; July 16, 1901 – February 3, 1951) was a French Augustinian nun. She took the name Mother Yvonne-Aimée of Jesus. This Catholic nun was known for the phenomenon of bilocation and also helped Allied soldiers and French resistance fighters during World War II, and in 1946, she established the Federation of the Augustinian monasteries.

== Biography ==
Beauvais was born in Cossé-en-Champagne in the Mayenne department. Her father died when she was three and she went to stay with her maternal grandmother. She returned to live with her mother the following year, staying at boarding schools where her mother was director. At the age of twenty, she joined with the Association of the Children of Mary Immaculate in serving the poor. Beauvais fell ill the following year with typhoid fever and was treated at a small hospital at Malestroit run by the Augustinian Sisters of Mercy. In March 1927, she entered the convent at Malestroit as a postulant, and in September 1931 made her perpetual vows. In 1935, she was elected mother superior for the community.

She helped Allied soldiers and French resistance fighters during World War II by sheltering them at the hospital and aiding their escape. She is said to have disguised some Allied airmen as nuns. She was awarded the French Legion of Honour by General Charles de Gaulle.

In 1946, she established the Federation of the Augustinian monasteries and became its first Superior General.

In early 1951, she was planning to visit nuns of the order in Natal, South Africa. However, she died in February before her departure at the age of 49 from a cerebral hemorrhage in Malestroit.

== Apparition ==
Beauvais reported that on August 17, 1922, while staying at the monastery of the Augustinian Canonesses of the Mercy of Jesus at Malestroit, Jesus appeared to her saying, "Morning and evening say, O Jesus, King of Love, I put my trust in Thy Merciful Goodness."

At first, the short invocation spread by word of mouth. In 1932 the Bishop of Vannes, France, approved the invocation for his diocese. Pope John XXIII extended it to the universal Church.
