= Edmund Aubrey Hunt =

American painter (1855–1922)

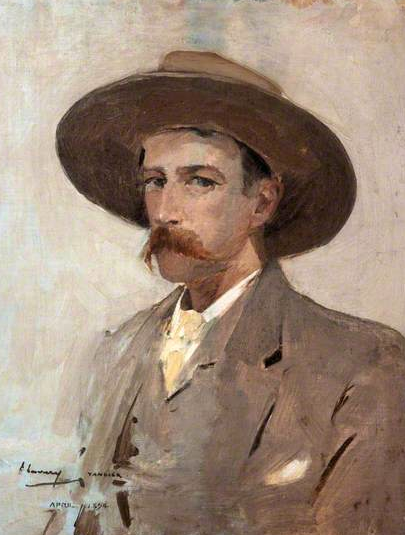
Edmund Aubrey Hunt; portrait by John Lavery (date unknown)

Edmund Aubrey Hunt (17 February 1855, in Weymouth, Massachusetts – 22 November 1922, in Hastings, East Sussex) was an American-born painter; primarily of landscapes and rural scenes, although he also created Orientalist works. Some generally reliable art websites give his first name as Edward. A few erroneously give his birthplace as Weymouth, England.

== Biography ==
His father was the entrepreneur and inventor, Edmund Soper Hunt, who operated a fireworks factory, made ladies' fans, and devised improvements to the line-throwing cannon, used in marine rescue operations.

After graduating from college, he entered the prominent architectural firm of Emerson and Fehmer, but decided to pursue a career as an artist instead. He received his initial art instruction from Jean-Léon Gérôme at the École des Beaux-Arts in Paris. He studied there for five years, altogether. During that time, he also travelled throughout Europe. In 1878, while making copies in the Louvre, he met Agnes Fitzgibbon, from England. They were married shortly after.

The newlywed couple moved to London, where he had recently held several exhibits. He frequently took paintings back to the United States, where they were exhibited at galleries in Boston. His local venues included the Royal Birmingham Society of Artists, the Walker Art Gallery in Liverpool and the Royal Academy. While in England, he continued to travel; visiting France, the Low Countries, Italy and Morocco, which inspired his first Orientalist works.

His marriage to Agnes ended in the late 1880s, and their four children went with her, but he met another Englishwoman, the well-to-do Maude Chadwick, during a trip to North Africa, and they were married in 1892. Both admirers of the area, they settled in Tangier, where they lived for ten years. He perfected his Orientalist paintings there, and became an acquaintance of the local ruler.

After the birth of a daughter, they returned to England and settled in Huntingdonshire, where they had a son. Later, they moved to Rye and, during World War I, to Hastings. When he died, his body was cremated and returned to his hometown for burial.

== Selected paintings ==
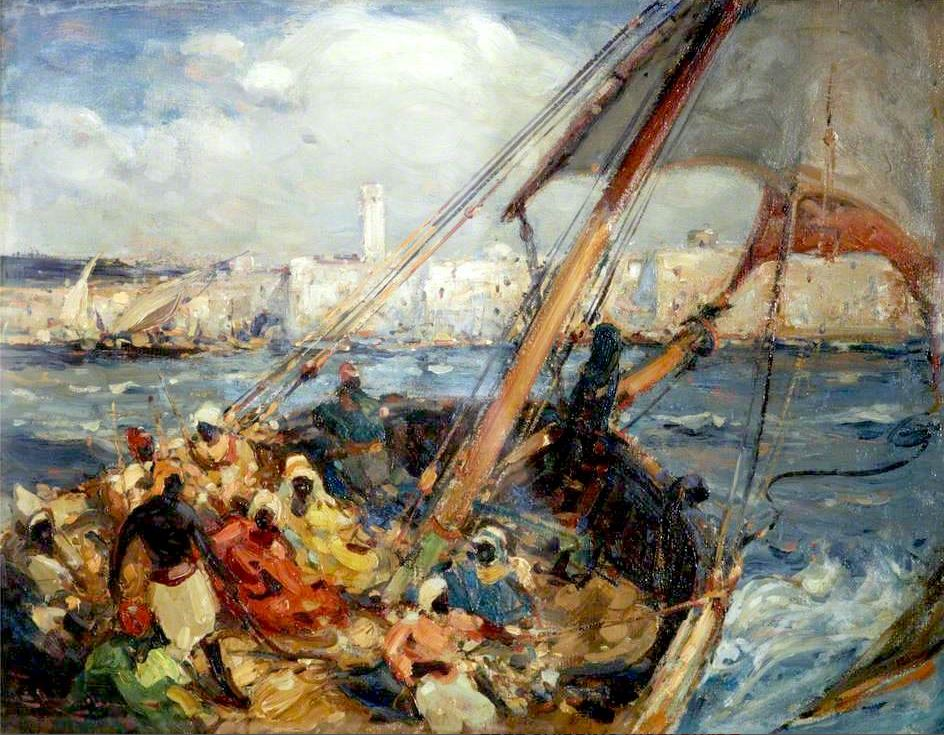
Sallee Rover

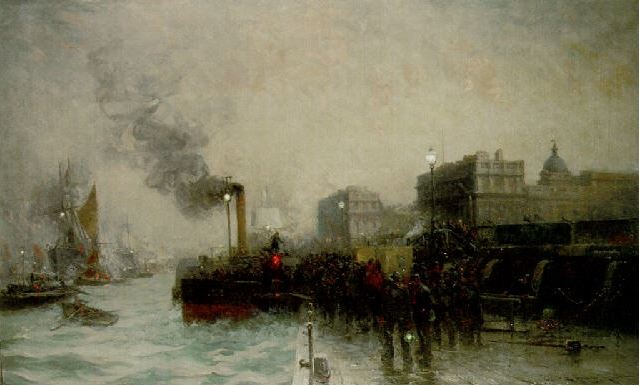
The Last Ship Up, in Greenwich

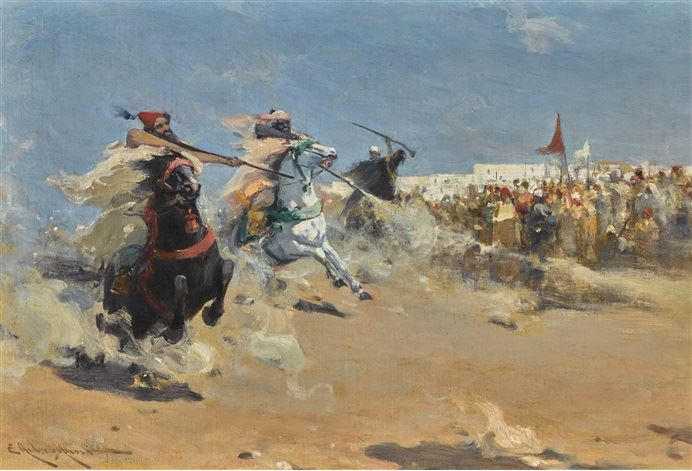
Arab Fantasia

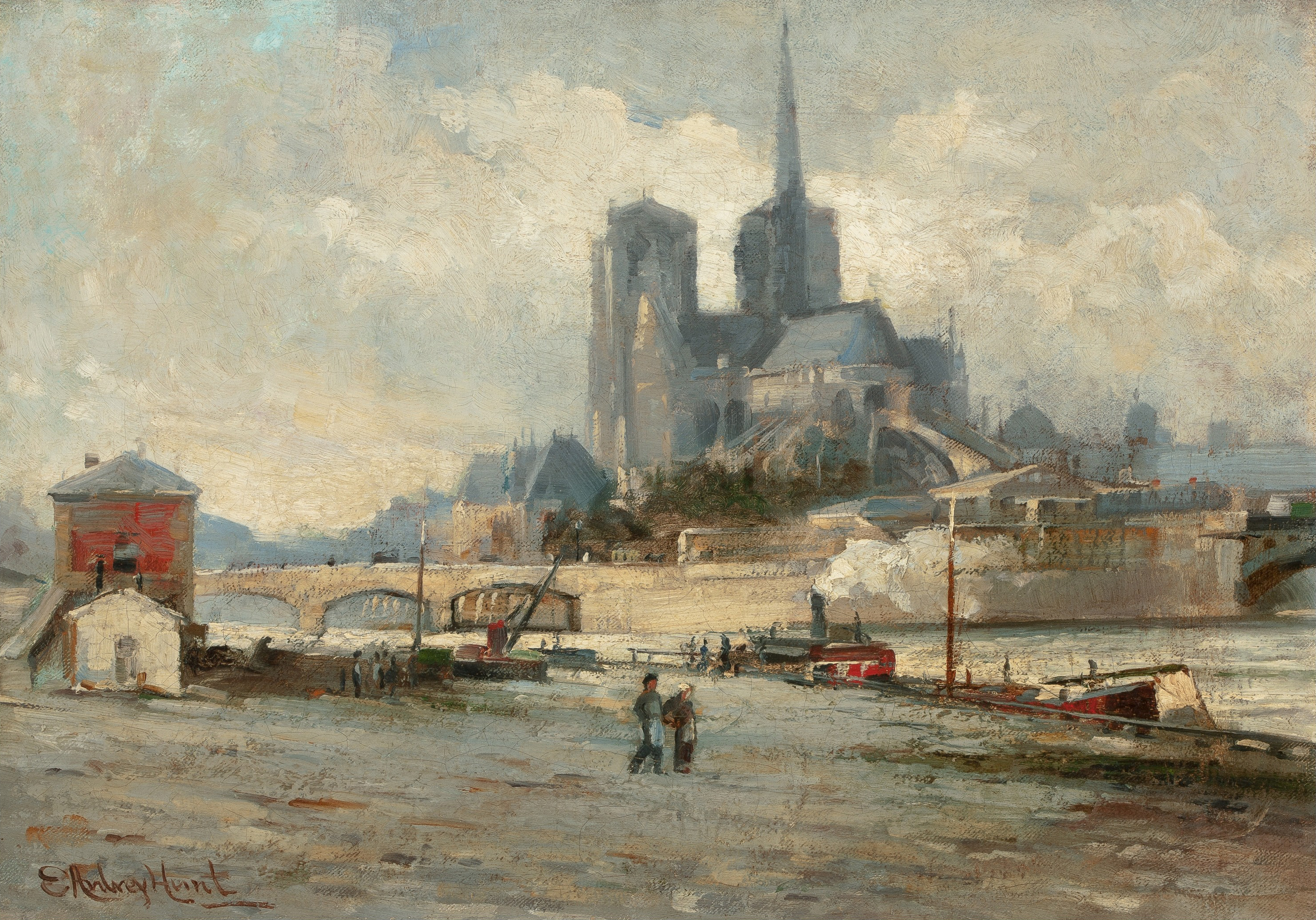
View of Notre Dame
