= Diane Willis (professor) =

American psychologist

Diane Janice Willis
- Born: Diane Janice Willis; 9 May 1937 (age 89); Oklahoma, United States

Academic background
- Education: Northeastern State University; University of Oklahoma; George Peabody College
- Thesis: Perceptual and cognitive performance of children as functions of socio-economic class (1970)
- Doctoral advisor: Nicholas Hobbs

Academic work
- Discipline: Psychologist
- Sub-discipline: Child Psychology

Diane Janice Willis is an American psychologist who focuses on clinical adolescence and child psychology. As of 2024 she is a professor emeritus at the University of Oklahoma Health Science Center.

== Early life and education ==
Diane Janice Willis was born on May 9, 1937 in Northern Oklahoma. Her father, William Paschal, was a teacher and high school principal, but when he met Willis' mother, Zelma Bynum Willis, he began to work for a business to provide for the family. Her family moved around, and eventually settled in Tahlequah, Oklahoma.

Willis graduated with a Bachelor's in Biology from Northeastern State University in Tahlequah, Oklahoma and went on to get her Master's of Arts in Psychology from George Peabody College in 1965. She decided she wanted to return home and was offered to start her PhD in University of Oklahoma's clinical training program where she worked with Muzafer Sherif. In 1970 she was awarded her PhD in Psychology from the University of Oklahoma.

== Career and research ==
In 1973 Diane became editor for the Society of Pediatric Psychology newsletter, which was later renamed the Journal of Pediatric Psychology.

After finishing her postdoctoral training from University of Oklahoma Health Sciences Center, Willis took on the Chief Psychologist position at John W. Keys Speech and Hearing Center. From 1974 until around late 1975 Willis worked as a psychology consultant. She then accepted the position of Director of Psychological Services at the Child Study Center.

Willis’s research focused on understanding how learning disabilities and outside factors affected their learning. She is also known for her work starting outreach programs for Native Americans.

== Awards and recognition ==
In 1992 Willis received the American Psychological Association's Citizen Psychologist Presidential Citation for her leadership in elevating behavioral services that are available to children and families in Native American communities. In 2012 the Diane Willis Award for an outstanding article in the Journal of Pediatric Psychology was established. She received the Distinguished Professional Contribution to Clinical Psychology Award in 2017. Willis is a member of the Native American Kiowa tribe and was awarded the Indian Woman of the Year by the Oklahoma Federation of Indian Women.

== Selected publications ==
- Willis, Diane J.; Wright, Logan; Wolfe, John (June 1972). "WISC and Nebraska Performance of Deaf and Hearing Children". Perceptual and Motor Skills. 34 (3): 783–788. doi:10.2466/pms.1972.34.3.783. ISSN 0031-5125. PMID 5040493. S2CID 40169009.
- Carpenter, Robert L.; Willis, Diane J. (March 1972). "Case Study of on Auditory Dyslexic". Journal of Learning Disabilities. 5 (3): 121–129. doi:10.1177/002221947200500301. ISSN 0022-2194. S2CID 142296028.
- Willis, Diane J.; Holden, E. Wayne; Rosenberg, Mindy, eds. (1992). Prevention of child maltreatment: developmental and ecological perspectives. New York: Wiley. ISBN 978-0-471-63419-5.
