= Psychopharmacotherapy =

Medical treatment using psychoactive drugs

Psychopharmacotherapy is the medical treatment of mental disorders using psychoactive medications. These pharmacological agents affect the central nervous system in order to influence psychological functioning, emotions, and behavior. According to the World Health Organization's 1976 definition, psychopharmaceuticals are substances that impact psychological functions, behavior, and self-perception.

== History ==
The term "psychopharmacology" and "psychopharmacotherapy" was likely first coined by American pharmacologist David Macht in 1920 during studies on substances such as alcohol, caffeine, and opiates. Its application in psychiatry was later advanced by Melvin Wilfred Thorner in 1935, who described sleep therapy using sodium amytal.

The concept of influencing mental states with psychoactive substances dates back to antiquity. Classical sources such as Homer recount the use of herbal remedies for emotional relief. In the Middle Ages, valerian was employed for its sedative properties. During the 19th century, scientific developments in chemistry enabled the isolation and synthesis of potent psychoactive compounds, including morphine (1827) and heroin (late 19th century). Early experiments with cannabis and hashish in psychiatric institutions yielded limited results, though figures like Emil Kraepelin advocated cannabis for sleep induction. Cocaine was widely used in the late 19th century and was endorsed by Sigmund Freud for its stimulant effects in treating neurasthenia. The synthesis of barbiturates began in the early 20th century with barbital (1903), followed by phenobarbital (1914), marking the beginning of synthetic hypnotics and anxiolytics.

The mid-20th century witnessed a transformative period with the introduction of several major classes of psychotropic medications. Chlorpromazine, synthesized in 1950, emerged as the first widely used antipsychotic. Around the same time, reserpine was isolated from Rauwolfia serpentina, a plant with a longstanding role in Ayurveda. Imipramine, the first tricyclic antidepressant, was discovered serendipitously during investigations into chlorpromazine analogs. Similarly, iproniazid, a monoamine oxidase inhibitor (MAOI), was initially developed as a treatment for tuberculosis before its mood-elevating properties were identified.

The discovery of lithium's antimanic properties in 1949 and its prophylactic role in bipolar disorder in 1971 introduced the first effective mood stabilizer. In subsequent decades, additional antipsychotics such as haloperidol (1958), clozapine (early 1970s), sulpiride (1968), and risperidone (1990s) were introduced. The development of selective serotonin reuptake inhibitors (SSRIs) and other newer antidepressants in the late 20th century reflected ongoing efforts to enhance efficacy, safety, and tolerability.

== Principles ==
Psychopharmacotherapy is the branch of medicine in psychology and pharmacotherapy concerned with the treatment of mental and emotional disorders through the administration of psychoactive drugs. These pharmacological agents affect the central nervous system in order to influence psychological functioning, emotions, and behavior. Psychopharmacotherapy is grounded in evidence-based medicine (EBM), which involves the integration of clinical expertise with the best available research evidence. EBM draws upon systematic reviews, randomized controlled trials (RCTs), and meta-analyses to inform treatment guidelines. However, in psychiatry, EBM faces methodological challenges, including heterogeneous study populations, placebo effects, and complexities in translating research findings into individualized care.

Effective psychopharmacotherapy necessitates tailoring treatment to the individual patient. Variables such as age, sex, weight, metabolic rate, organ function, comorbidities, genetic background, and personal treatment philosophy influence therapeutic outcomes. The clinician must consider these factors alongside patient preferences and treatment history to optimize drug selection and dosing.

Creative psychopharmacotherapy refers to a flexible, symptom-focused approach that addresses underlying psychopathological processes rather than adhering strictly to diagnostic categories. Treatment is continuously adjusted based on the presence, severity, and evolution of target symptoms, such as hallucinations, anxiety, major depressive disorder, or sleep disturbances.

=== Pharmacogenetics ===
Pharmacogenetic polymorphisms affecting drug metabolism, particularly involving cytochrome P450 enzymes such as CYP2D6, play a significant role in individual drug response and tolerability. Pharmacogenetic testing can help identify poor or ultra-rapid metabolizers, informing drug selection and dosage adjustments. Ethnic variation in metabolizer status adds further complexity to global treatment practices.

== Clinical uses ==
Psychopharmacotherapy is primarily used in the treatment of serious mental disorders such as schizophrenia, bipolar disorder, major depressive disorder, obsessive–compulsive disorder and anxiety disorders. More generally, psychoactive drugs are defined by World Health Organization's 1976 definition as drugs that affect psychological functions, behavior and self-perception. In these cases, it is often considered the central or first-line intervention. Modern practice in integrating psychotherapy and medicine favors combined treatment models, where medication helps alleviate debilitating symptoms and allows patients to engage more fully in the therapeutic process.

For schizophrenia, antipsychotics are used in both acute and long-term management. In bipolar disorder, mood stabilizers and antipsychotics are employed to manage manic episodes and prevent relapse, while antidepressants may be used cautiously for bipolar depression. In major depression, antidepressant drugs are the standard treatment for acute episodes. Anxiety disorders are treated with a range of medications including pregabalin, buspirone, moclobemide and tricyclic antidepressants, among others. Once remission is achieved, it should typically be continued for six to twelve months to prevent relapse.

Beyond these primary uses, psychopharmacotherapy is also applied in the treatment of personality disorders, typically in conjunction with psychotherapy. It plays a role in managing attention deficit hyperactivity disorder (ADHD), particularly with stimulant and non-stimulant agents, and is used for disruptive behavior and internalizing disorders in children and adolescents. In cases of insomnia, nonbenzodiazepine receptor agonists are often prescribed. The approach extends to neurological conditions as well, such as Parkinson's disease, where antiparkinsonian medications and monoamine oxidase B inhibitors like selegiline and rasagiline are used, and dementia, where anti-dementia drugs target cognitive symptoms. Nootropics are also mentioned in the context of improving mental performance. Psychopharmacotherapy is sometimes used to support recovery from opioid use disorder, especially in the context of medication-assisted treatment.

== Administration ==
The timing and scheduling of medication administration should account for both pharmacologic and psychological factors. For instance, drugs with sedative effects may be best taken at night, while dosing regimens should be simplified whenever possible to increase adherence. In some cases, patient preference or routine can influence the decision. Safety in prescribing is a major concern, especially in populations at risk of suicide. Many psychoactive drugs have narrow safety margins in overdose. As a result, it is common practice to prescribe limited quantities at a time.

=== Adverse effects ===
All psychoactive medications are associated with a range of potential adverse effects. Common side effects include dizziness, nausea, agitation, insomnia, tremor, and gastrointestinal disturbances. More severe risks include cardiovascular diseases, metabolic changes, or extrapyramidal symptoms, depending on the drug class. Abrupt discontinuation can result in withdrawal syndromes characterized by symptoms ranging from vertigo and nausea to, in rare cases, psychosis or seizures. Consequently, careful titration and patient education are essential components of safe prescribing.
