= David S. Krantz =

American health psychologist

- Born: 1949 (age 76–77)
- Education: City College of New York (B.S., 1971); University of Texas at Austin (Ph.D., 1975)
- Known for: Research on psychological stress and cardiovascular disease; development of the Krantz Health Opinion Survey (KHOS)
- Awards: American Psychological Association (APA) Distinguished Scientific Award for an Early Career Contribution to Psychology (1982); Society for Health Psychology Award for Outstanding Contributions to Health Psychology, Early Career category (1981) and Lifetime Career category (2000)
- Scientific career
- Fields: Health psychology Behavioral medicine
- Workplaces: Uniformed Services University of the Health Sciences
- Doctoral advisor: David C. Glass

Health psychology

David S. Krantz (David Krantz) (born 1949) is an American health psychologist, researcher, and professor emeritus of medical and clinical psychology at the Uniformed Services University of the Health Sciences (USUHS) in Bethesda, Maryland. His research is in areas of health psychology and behavioral medicine, with a focus on psychological stress and cardiovascular disease. He is a past president of the Society for Health Psychology (Division 38 of the American Psychological Association) and of the Academy of Behavioral Medicine Research, and was editor-in-chief of the journal Health Psychology.

== Education ==
Krantz received a B.S. in psychology from the City College of New York in 1971 and a Ph.D. in psychology from the University of Texas at Austin in 1975, where his doctoral advisor was David C. Glass.

== Career ==
Krantz was an assistant professor of psychology at the University of Southern California from 1975 to 1978. He joined the Uniformed Services University of the Health Sciences (USUHS) in 1978 and was a professor of medical and clinical psychology there until his retirement in 2023, when he became professor emeritus. He served as Chair of the Department of Medical and Clinical Psychology from 1999 to 2014, and was the USUHS principal investigator for the Center for Deployment Psychology (now the Consortium for Defense Psychology) from 2006 to 2015.

He was president of the Academy of Behavioral Medicine Research from 1994 to 1995, editor-in-chief of Health Psychology from 1995 to 1999, and president of the Society for Health Psychology from 2005 to 2006.

== Research ==
Krantz's research has included studies of stress reactivity and cardiovascular disease, collaborative research with multidisciplinary research groups on mental stress–induced myocardial ischemia in coronary artery disease patients, and studies of the effects of mental stress and anger in patients with heart failure or life-threatening arrhythmias. Much of this work incorporates and integrates biomedical, psychosocial, and psychophysiological measures and outcomes.

In 1980, he developed the Krantz Health Opinion Survey, a questionnaire measuring patients' preferences for information and for involvement in their own health care, which is listed in psychological test reference works, and has been used in translated versions in several languages.

== Awards and honors ==
- American Psychological Association (APA) Distinguished Scientific Award for an Early Career Contribution to Psychology (1982)
- Society for Health Psychology (formerly APA Division 38) Award for Outstanding Contributions to Health Psychology, Early Career category (1981) and Lifetime Career category (2000)
- Fellow of the American Psychological Association, the Academy of Behavioral Medicine Research, and Distinguished Fellow of the Society for Biopsychosocial Science and Medicine
