= Cardiac psychology =

Cardiac psychology is a specialization of health psychology that focuses on the primary and secondary prevention of heart disease by incorporating strategies to address the emotional and behavioral barriers to lifestyle changes (e.g. smoking cessation), and that seeks to enhance recovery in cardiac patients by means of providing patients tools (e.g. stress management and psychotherapy) to cope with life and physical changes associated with their disease. Cardiac psychologists can help cardiac patients across the lifespan: prevention, pre-surgery, post-surgery, and rehabilitation of cardiac disease with a particular emphasis on achieving optimal quality of life outcomes. Cardiac psychology includes both research and clinical practice aspects.

== History ==
The earliest published mention of cardiac psychology in Western medicine literature was in 1628 when William Harvey wrote that "a mental disturbance provoking pain, excessive joy, hope or anxiety extends to the heart, where it affects temper." Research labs have been founded at Tilburg University, Tilburg Netherlands led by Susanne Pedersen, and at East Carolina University, Greenville, North Carolina led by Samuel Sears, that focus on psychological aspects of cardiac disease. Cardiac psychology as a term was first used by Robert Allan, PhD, and Stephen Schiedt, MD, as a title of their 1996 book, Heart and Mind: The Practice of Cardiac Psychology and launched increased attention to the clinical practice of cardiac psychology. More recently, additional texts, such as Psychotherapy with Cardiac Patients, (2008) by Ellen Dornelas, have attempted to update the literature related to clinical techniques used in the care of cardiac patients. Significant research reviews have also been published spanning psychological factors in cardiac care, implantable electronic medical devices (pacemaker, implantable cardioverter-defibrillator, etc.) and congestive heart failure.

== Applications ==
Cardiac psychology can be applied across multiple stages of cardiac care. Long-term rehabilitation and preventative interventions focus on addressing barriers that affect sustained lifestyle changes.

Techniques include cognitive behavioral therapy (CBT) which improves emotional responses reducing stress. This is specifically used pre-surgery in order to influence surgical outcomes.

== Impact on Patient Outcomes ==
Research has shown that cardiac psychology has improved patient outcomes in individuals with cardiovascular disease. Stress, depression and anxiety are known to influence progression of heart disease. Interventions and applications used in cardiac psychology aim to reduced risk factors and aid in long-term health.

Studies suggest that integrating psychological care with cardiac treatment has contributed to improved outcomes and lower hospital readmission rates.

== See also ==
- Health Psychology
