= RXP =

RXP, RxP or Rxp may refer to:

- RxP, Prescriptive authority for psychologists movement
- RXP (film), Fujichrome Provia 400X, a professional color reversal film by Fujifilm
- RXP, the Metro Trains station code for Roxburgh Park railway station, Victoria, Australia
