= International Journal of Clinical and Health Psychology =

- Discipline: Clinical psychology Health psychology
- Language: English; Portuguese; Spanish
- Edited by: Juan Carlos Sierra

Publication details
- History: 2001
- Publisher: Elsevier
- Frequency: Triannual
- Impact factor: 3.900 (2017)

Standard abbreviations
- ISO 4: Int. J. Clin. Health Psychol.

Indexing
- ISSN: 1697-2600 (print); 2174-0852 (web)
- OCLC no.: 1026655295

Links
- Journal homepage; Online archive

International Journal of Clinical and Health Psychology, also known by its Spanish-language title Revista Internacional de Psicologia Clinica y de la Salud, is a triannual peer-reviewed medical journal covering clinical and health psychology. It was established in 2001 and is published by Elsevier and the Asociación Española de Psicología Conductual. The editor-in-chief is Juan Carlos Sierra (Universidad de Granada). According to the Journal Citation Reports, the journal has a 2017 impact factor of 3.900.
