= Joseph Matarazzo =

American psychologist (1925–2025)

- Born: November 12, 1925; Caiazzo, Italy
- Died: January 23, 2025 (aged 99)
- Education: Columbia University; Brown University; Northwestern University
- Known for: 98th president of the American Psychological Association
- Scientific career
- Fields: Health psychology

Giuseppe (Joseph) Dominic Matarazzo (November 12, 1925 – January 23, 2025) was an American psychologist and a past president of the American Psychological Association (APA). He chaired the first medical psychology department in the United States and has been credited with much of the early work in health psychology.

== Biography ==
=== Early life ===
Matarazzo was born in Caiazzo, Italy. He attended school in New York and then joined the United States Navy. He attended Columbia University and Brown University before earning a PhD in clinical psychology at Northwestern University. Matarazzo had decided upon a career in psychology while talking with a physician aboard a naval ship.

=== Career ===
Early in his career, Matarazzo taught psychology at the Washington University School of Medicine and Harvard Medical School. From 1957 to 1996, Matarazzo was the founding chairman of the medical psychology department at Oregon Health Sciences University (OHSU), the first such department in the U.S. with administrative autonomy. In 1989, Matarazzo served as president of the APA. He was a professor emeritus at OHSU, where his research interests include behavioral cardiology and neuropsychology. He is credited with naming and laying the foundation for the field of health psychology. He was the first president of the APA's Division of Health Psychology in 1978.

In addition to his service with the APA, Matarazzo has served as president of the American Psychological Foundation, the Oregon Mental Health Association, the International Council of Psychologists, the Academy of Behavioral Medicine Research and the American Association of State Psychology Boards.

=== Legacy ===
The Joseph D. Matarazzo Award for Distinguished Contributions to Psychology in Academic Health Centers is awarded by the Association of Psychologists in Academic Health Centers to recognize "outstanding psychologists whose work in medical school and health care settings has enhanced the roles of psychologists in education, research, and clinical care."

In 2015, Newsweek mentioned Matarazzo in an article on the involvement of APA officials in U.S. interrogation programs and torture. When psychologists had complained about the involvement of their profession in such interrogation programs, Matarazzo had authored a memo stating that sleep deprivation did not amount to torture. He later held owned shares in a company that had designed the interrogation programs.

== Personal life and death ==
Matarazzo's wife Ruth was also a psychologist. She was a professor emerita at OHSU. He died on January 23, 2025, at the age of 99.
