= Rachel Zoffness =

American pain psychologist

Academic background
- Education: Brown University; Columbia University; San Diego State University; University of California, San Diego

Academic work
- Institutions: UCSF School of Medicine

Rachel Zoffness is an American pain psychologist and author. She is an assistant clinical professor at the UCSF School of Medicine and lectures at Stanford University. Zoffness is the author of Tell Me Where It Hurts, The Pain Management Workbook and The Chronic Pain and Illness Workbook for Teens.

== Education ==
Zoffness attended Brown University, where she earned a Bachelor of Arts in Human Biology: Brain and Behavior in 1998. She earned a Master of Arts in Psychology and Education from Teachers College, Columbia University in 2001 and a Master of Science in Clinical Psychology at San Diego State University in 2009. She completed her doctorate in clinical psychology at the University of California, San Diego in 2011.

== Publications ==
=== Books ===
- The Chronic Pain and Illness Workbook for Teens: CBT and Mindfulness-Based Practices to Turn the Volume Down on Pain, 2019
- The Pain Management Workbook: Powerful CBT and Mindfulness Skills to Take Control of Pain and Reclaim Your Life, 2020
- Tell Me Where It Hurts: The New Science of Pain and How to Heal, 2026
