= Psychiatric medication =

Medication used to treat mental disorders

A psychiatric or psychotropic medication is a psychoactive drug taken to exert an effect on the chemical makeup of the brain and nervous system. Thus, these medications are used to treat mental illnesses. These medications are typically made of synthetic chemical compounds and are usually prescribed in psychiatric settings, potentially involuntarily during commitment.

Since the mid-20th century, such medications have been leading treatments for a broad range of mental disorders and have decreased the need for long-term hospitalization, thereby lowering the cost of mental health care. The recidivism or rehospitalization of the mentally ill is at a high rate in many countries, and the reasons for the relapses are under research.

Psychiatric medications are prescription-only and come in forms such as pills, patches, injections, or inhalation. They carry risks like neurotoxicity, withdrawal, and complications from untested drug combinations. Their use is controversial, with critics citing overmedicalization, placebo effects, and potential long-term brain changes. Untreated mental illness also poses cognitive risks.

A 2022 umbrella review of over 100 meta-analyses found that both psychotherapies and pharmacotherapies for adult mental disorders generally yield small effect sizes, suggesting current treatment research may have reached a ceiling and needs a paradigm shift.

== History ==
Several significant psychiatric drugs were developed in the mid-20th century. In 1948, lithium was first used as a psychiatric medicine. One of the most important discoveries was chlorpromazine, an antipsychotic that was first given to a patient in 1952. In the same decade, Julius Axelrod carried out research into the interaction of neurotransmitters, which provided a foundation for the development of further drugs. The popularity of these drugs have increased significantly since then, with millions prescribed annually.

The introduction of these drugs brought profound changes to the treatment of mental illness. It meant that more patients could be treated without the need for confinement in a psychiatric hospital. It was one of the key reasons why many countries moved towards deinstitutionalization, closing many of these hospitals so that patients could be treated at home, in general hospitals and smaller facilities. Use of physical restraints such as straitjackets also declined.

== Administration ==
Psychiatric medications are prescription medications, requiring a prescription from a physician, such as a psychiatrist, or a psychiatric nurse practitioner, PMHNP, before they can be obtained. Some U.S. states and territories, following the creation of the prescriptive authority for psychologists movement, have granted prescriptive privileges to clinical psychologists who have undergone additional specialised education and training in medical psychology. In addition to the familiar dosage in pill form, psychiatric medications are evolving into more novel methods of drug delivery. New technologies include transdermal, transmucosal, inhalation, suppository or depot injection supplements.

== Research ==
Psychopharmacology studies a wide range of substances with various types of psychoactive properties. The professional and commercial fields of pharmacology and psychopharmacology do not typically focus on psychedelic or recreational drugs, and so the majority of studies are conducted on psychiatric medication. While studies are conducted on all psychoactive drugs by both fields, psychopharmacology focuses on psychoactive and chemical interactions within the brain. Physicians who research psychiatric medications are psychopharmacologists, specialists in the field of psychopharmacology.

A 2022 umbrella review of over 100 meta-analyses found that both psychotherapies and pharmacotherapies for adult mental disorders generally yield small effect sizes, suggesting current treatment research may have reached a ceiling and needs a paradigm shift.

== Adverse and withdrawal effects ==
Psychiatric disorders, including depression, psychosis, and bipolar disorder, are common and gaining more acceptance in the United States. The most commonly used classes of medications for these disorders are antidepressants, antipsychotics, and lithium. Unfortunately, these medications are associated with significant neurotoxicities.

Psychiatric medications carry risk for neurotoxic adverse effects. The occurrence of neurotoxic effects can potentially reduce drug compliance. Some adverse effects can be treated symptomatically by using adjunct medications such as anticholinergics (antimuscarinics). Some rebound or withdrawal adverse effects, such as the possibility of a sudden or severe emergence or re-emergence of psychosis in antipsychotic withdrawal, may appear when the drugs are discontinued, or discontinued too rapidly.

=== Medicine combinations with clinically untried risks ===
While clinical trials of psychiatric medications, like other medications, typically test medicines separately, there is a practice in psychiatry (more so than in somatic medicine) to use polypharmacy in combinations of medicines that have never been tested together in clinical trials (though all medicines involved have passed clinical trials separately). Polypharmacy that includes a benzodiazepine is associated with increased mortality in patients with schizophrenia.

== Types ==
There are five main groups of psychiatric medications.

- Antidepressants, which treat disparate disorders such as clinical depression, dysthymia, anxiety disorders, eating disorders and borderline personality disorder.
- Antipsychotics, which treat psychotic disorders such as schizophrenia and psychotic symptoms occurring in the context of other disorders such as mood disorders. They are also used for the treatment of bipolar disorder.
- Anxiolytics, which treat anxiety disorders, and include hypnotics and sedatives
- Mood stabilizers, which treat bipolar disorder and schizoaffective disorder.
- Stimulants, which treat disorders such as attention deficit hyperactivity disorder and narcolepsy.

=== Antidepressants ===
Antidepressants are drugs used to treat clinical depression, and they are also often used for anxiety and other disorders. Most antidepressants will hinder the breakdown of serotonin, norepinephrine, and/or dopamine. A commonly used class of antidepressants are called selective serotonin reuptake inhibitors (SSRIs), which act on serotonin transporters in the brain to increase levels of serotonin in the synaptic cleft. Another is the serotonin-norepinephrine reuptake inhibitors (SNRIs), which increase both serotonin and norepinephrine. Antidepressants will often take 3–5 weeks to have a noticeable effect as the regulation of receptors in the brain adapts. There are multiple classes of antidepressants which have different mechanisms of action. Another type of antidepressant is a monoamine oxidase inhibitor (MAOI), which is thought to block the action of monoamine oxidase, an enzyme that breaks down serotonin and norepinephrine. MAOIs are not used as first-line treatment due to the risk of hypertensive crisis related to the consumption of foods containing the trace amine tyramine.

Common antidepressants:

- Fluoxetine (Prozac), SSRI
- Paroxetine (Paxil, Seroxat), SSRI
- Citalopram (Celexa), SSRI
- Escitalopram (Lexapro), SSRI
- Sertraline (Zoloft), SSRI
- Duloxetine (Cymbalta), SNRI
- Venlafaxine (Effexor), SNRI
- Bupropion (Wellbutrin), NDRI
- Mirtazapine (Remeron), NaSSA
- Isocarboxazid (Marplan), MAOI
- Phenelzine (Nardil), MAOI
- Tranylcypromine (Parnate), MAOI
- Amitriptyline (Elavil), TCA

=== Antipsychotics ===
Antipsychotics are drugs used to treat various symptoms of psychosis, such as those caused by psychotic disorders or schizophrenia. Atypical antipsychotics are also used as mood stabilizers in the treatment of bipolar disorder, and they can augment the action of antidepressants in major depressive disorder. Antipsychotics are sometimes referred to as neuroleptic drugs or major tranquilizers.

There are two categories of antipsychotics: typical antipsychotics and atypical antipsychotics. Most antipsychotics are available only by prescription.

Common antipsychotics:

Typical antipsychotics
- Chlorpromazine (Thorazine)
- Haloperidol (Haldol)
- Perphenazine (Trilafon)
- Thioridazine (Melleril)
- Thiothixene (Navane)
- Flupenthixol (Fluanxol)
- Trifluoperazine (Stelazine)
- Levomepromazine (Nozinan)
Atypical antipsychotics
- Aripiprazole (Abilify)
- Clozapine (Clozaril)
- Lurasidone (Latuda)
- Olanzapine (Zyprexa)
- Paliperidone (Invega)
- Quetiapine (Seroquel)
- Risperidone (Risperdal)
- Zotepine (Nipolept)
- Ziprasidone (Geodon)

=== Anxiolytics and hypnotics ===
Benzodiazepines are effective as hypnotics, anxiolytics, anticonvulsants, myorelaxants and amnesics. Having less proclivity for overdose and toxicity, they have widely supplanted barbiturates, although barbiturates (such as pentobarbital) are still used for euthanasia.

Developed in the 1950s onward, benzodiazepines were originally thought to be non-addictive at therapeutic doses, but are now known to cause withdrawal symptoms similar to barbiturates and alcohol. Benzodiazepines are generally recommended for short-term use.

Z-drugs are a group of drugs with effects generally similar to benzodiazepines, which are used in the treatment of insomnia.

Common benzodiazepines and z-drugs include:

Benzodiazepines
- Alprazolam (Xanax), anxiolytic
- Chlordiazepoxide (Librium), anxiolytic
- Clonazepam (Klonopin), anxiolytic
- Diazepam (Valium), anxiolytic
- Lorazepam (Ativan), anxiolytic
- Nitrazepam (Mogadon), hypnotic
- Temazepam (Restoril), hypnotic
- Midazolam (Versed), hypnotic
Z-drug hypnotics
- Eszopiclone (Lunesta)
- Zaleplon (Sonata)
- Zolpidem (Ambien, Stilnox)
- Zopiclone (Imovan)

=== Mood stabilizers ===
In 1949, the Australian John Cade discovered that lithium salts could control mania, reducing the frequency and severity of manic episodes. This introduced the now popular drug lithium carbonate to the mainstream public, as well as being the first mood stabilizer to be approved by the U.S. Food & Drug Administration. Besides lithium, several anticonvulsants and atypical antipsychotics have mood stabilizing activity. The mechanism of action of mood stabilizers is not well understood.

Common non-antipsychotic mood stabilizers include:

- Lithium (Lithobid, Eskalith), the oldest mood stabilizer
- Anticonvulsants
  - Carbamazepine (Tegretol) and the related compound oxcarbazepine (Trileptal)
  - Valproic acid, and salts (Depakene, Depakote)
  - Lamotrigine (Lamictal)

=== Stimulants ===
A stimulant is a drug that stimulates the central nervous system, increasing arousal, attention and endurance. Stimulants are used in psychiatry to treat attention deficit-hyperactivity disorder. Because the medications can be addictive, patients with a history of drug abuse are typically monitored closely or treated with a non-stimulant.

Common stimulants:

- Methylphenidate (Ritalin, Concerta), a norepinephrine-dopamine reuptake inhibitor
- Dexmethylphenidate (Focalin), the active dextro-enantiomer of methylphenidate
- Serdexmethylphenidate/dexmethylphenidate (Azstarys)
- Mixed amphetamine salts (Adderall), a 3:1 mix of dextro/levo-enantiomers of amphetamine
- Dextroamphetamine (Dexedrine), the dextro-enantiomer of amphetamine
- Lisdexamfetamine (Vyvanse), a prodrug containing the dextro-enantiomer of amphetamine
- Methamphetamine (Desoxyn), a potent but infrequently prescribed amphetamine

== Controversies ==
Professionals, such as David Rosenhan, Peter Breggin, Paula Caplan, Thomas Szasz, Giorgio Antonucci and Stuart A. Kirk, sustain that psychiatry engages "in the systematic medicalization of normality". More recently these concerns have come from insiders who have worked for and promoted the APA (e.g., Robert Spitzer, Allen Frances).

Scholars such as Cooper, Foucalt, Goffman, Deleuze and Szasz believe that pharmacological "treatment" is only a placebo effect, and that administration of drugs is just a religion in disguise and ritualistic chemistry. Other scholars have argued against psychiatric medication in that significant aspects of mental illness are related to the psyche or environmental factors, but medication works exclusively on a pharmacological basis.

Antipsychotics have been associated with decreases in brain volume over time (cerebral atrophy), which may indicate a neurotoxic effect. However, untreated psychosis has also been associated with decreases in brain volume and treatments have been shown improve cognitive functioning.

== See also ==
- Psychopharmacology
- Medication
- Medicine
