= Medical psychology =

Application of psychological principles to the practice of medicine

Medical Psychologist
Occupation
- Names: Clinical psychologist
- Occupation type: Specialty
- Activity sectors: Clinical Psychology, Medicine

Description
- Education required: Doctor of Psychology (Psy.D.) Or Doctor of Philosophy (Ph.D.) Master of Science in Clinical Psychopharmacology (MSCP)
- Fields of employment: Hospitals, clinics
- Related jobs: Psychiatrist Psychotherapist

Medical psychology or Medicopsychology is the application of psychological principles to the practice of medicine, sometimes using drugs for both physical and mental disorders.

A medical psychologist must obtain specific qualification in psychopharmacology to prescribe psychiatric medications and other pharmaceutical drugs. A trained medical psychologist or clinical psychopharmacologist with prescriptive authority is a mid-level provider who prescribes psychotropic medication such as antidepressants for mental health disorders. However, a medical psychologist does not automatically equate with a psychologist having authority to prescribe medication. In fact, most medical psychologists do not prescribe medication and do not have authority to do so.

Medical psychologists apply psychological theories, scientific psychological findings, and techniques of psychotherapy, behavior modification, cognitive, interpersonal, family, and lifestyle therapy to improve the psychological and physical health of the patient. Psychologists with postdoctoral specialty training as medical psychologists are the practitioners with refined skills in clinical psychology, health psychology, behavioral medicine, psychopharmacology, and medical science. Highly qualified and postgraduate specialized doctors are trained for service in primary care centers, hospitals, residential care centers, and long-term care facilities and in multidisciplinary collaboration and team treatment.

== Medical psychology specialty ==
The field of medical psychology may include predoctoral training in the disciplines of health psychology, rehabilitation psychology, pediatric psychology, neuropsychology, and clinical psychopharmacology, as well as subspecialties in pain management, primary care psychology, and hospital-based (or medical school-based) psychology as the foundation psychological training to qualify for proceeding to required postdoctoral specialty training to qualify to become a diplomate/specialist in medical psychology. To be a specialist in medical psychology, a psychologist must hold board certification from the American Board of Medical Psychology (ABMP), which requires a doctorate degree in psychology, a license to practice psychology, a postdoctoral graduate degree or other acceptable postdoctoral didactic training, a residency in medical psychology, submission of a work product for examination, and a written and oral examination by the American Board of Medical Psychology. The American Board of Medical Psychology maintains a distinction between specialists and psychopharmacological psychologists or those interested in practicing one of the related psychological disciplines in primary care centers. The term "medical psychologist" is not an umbrella term, and many other specialties in psychology such as health psychology, embracing the biopsychosocial paradigm (Engel, 1977) of mental/physical health and extending that paradigm to clinical practice through research and the application of evidenced-based diagnostic and treatment procedures are akin to the specialty and are prepared to practice in integrated and primary care settings.

The Louisiana Academy of Medical Psychology (LAMP), currently one of the largest organization of psychologists with prescriptive authority in the world and the only organization representing practitioners of medical psychology in Louisiana as defined by Louisiana statute within any jurisdiction in the United States, no longer recognizes the Academy of Medical Psychology as an adequate certifying body for its practitioners, and its members have resigned from the Academy of Medical Psychology en masse.  Similarly, virtually all members of LAMP have also resigned from the Louisiana Psychological Association (LPA) after many LPA members uncovered that the LAMP's prescriptive authority movement covertly came to an agreement with Louisiana's medical board to transfer the entire practice of psychology for psychologists with prescriptive authority to the medical board.  Louisiana is the only state in which the practice of psychology, including psychological testing, psychotherapy, diagnosis, and treatment for some psychologists (i.e., medical psychologists) is regulated by a medical board.  

Adopting the biopsychosocial paradigm, the field of medical psychology has recognized the Cartesian assumption that the body and mind are separate entities is inadequate, representing as it does an arbitrary dichotomy that works to the detriment of healthcare. The biopsychosocial approach reflects the concept that the psychology of an individual cannot be understood without reference to that individual's social environment. For the medical psychologist, the medical model of disease cannot in itself explain complex health concerns any more than a strict psychosocial (LeVine & Orabona Foster, 2010) explanation of mental and physical health can in itself be comprehensive.

== Duties ==
Medical psychologists and some psychopharmacologists are trained and equipped to modify physical disease states and the actual cytoarchitecture and functioning of the central nervous and related systems using psychological and pharmacological techniques (when allowed by statute), and to provide prevention for the progression of disease having to do with poor personal and lifestyle choices and conceptualization, behavioral patterns, and chronic exposure to the effects of negative thinking, choosing, attitudes, and negative contexts. The specialty of medical psychology includes training in psychopharmacology and, in states providing statutory authority, may prescribe psychoactive substances as one technique in a larger treatment plan which includes psychological interventions. The medical psychologists and psychopharmacologists who serve in states that have not yet modernized their psychology prescribing laws may evaluate patients and recommend appropriate psychopharmacological techniques in collaboration with a state-authorized prescriber. Medical psychologists and psychopharmacologists who are not board certified strive to integrate the major components of an individual's psychological, biological, and social functioning and are designed to contribute to that person's well-being in a way that respects the natural interface among these components. The whole is greater than the sum of its parts when it comes to providing comprehensive and sensible behavioral healthcare and the medical psychologist is uniquely qualified to collaborate with physicians that are treating the patient's physical illnesses.

== Certifications ==
The Academy of Medical Psychology defines medical psychology as a specialty trained at the postdoctoral level and designed to deliver advanced diagnostic and clinical interventions in medical and healthcare facilities utilizing the knowledge and skills of clinical psychology, health psychology, behavioral medicine, psychopharmacology and basic medical science. The Academy of Medical Psychology makes a distinction between the prescribing psychologist who is a psychologist with advanced training in psychopharmacology and may prescribe medicine or consult with a physician or other prescriber to diagnose mental illness and select and recommend appropriate psychoactive medicines. Medical psychologists are prepared to do the psychopharmacology consulting or prescribing, but also must have training which prepares them for functioning with behavioral and lifestyle components of physical disease and functioning in or in consultation with multidisciplinary healthcare teams in primary care centers or community hospitals in addition to traditional roles in the treatment of mental illness and substance abuse disorders. The specialty of medical psychology and this distinction from psychopharmacologist is recognized by the National Alliance of Professional Psychology Providers (the psychology national practitioner association; see www.nappp.org).

The specialty of medical psychology has established a specialty board certification, American Board of Medical Psychology and Academy of Medical Psychology (www.amphome.org) requiring a doctoral degree in psychology and extensive postdoctoral training in the specialty and the passage of an oral and written examination.

Although the Academy of Medical Psychology defines medical psychology as a "specialty," has established a "specialty board certification," and is recognized by the national psychology practitioner association (www.nappp.org), there is a split between NAPPP and the American Psychological Association in that they do not currently recognize the same specialties. APA represents scientists, academics, and practitioners and NAPPP represents only practitioners. However, Louisiana, having a unique definition of medical psychology does recognize the national distinction between medical psychology as a specialty and a clinical psychopharmacology specialty and restricts the term and practice of medical psychology by statute (the Medical Psychology Practice Act) as a "profession of the health sciences" with prescriptive authority. The American Psychological Association does not recognize that the term medical psychology has, as a prerequisite, nor should the term be equated with having, prescriptive authority and has established a specialty in clinical psychopharmacology.

In 2006, the APA recommended that the education and training of psychologists, who are specifically pursuing one of several prerequisites for prescribing medication, integrate instruction in the biological sciences, clinical medicine, and pharmacology into a formalized program of postdoctoral education. In 2009, the National Alliance of Professional Providers in Psychology recognized the education and training specified by the American Board of Medical Psychology (www.amphome.org; ABMP) and the Academy of Medical Psychology as the approved standards for postgraduate training and examination and qualifications in the nationally recognized specialty in medical psychology. Since then, numerous hospitals, primary care centers, and other health facilities have recognized the ABMP standards and qualifications for privileges in healthcare facilities and verification of specialty status.

The following Clinical Competencies are identified as essential in the education and training of psychologists, wishing to pursue prescriptive authority. These recommended prerequisites are not required or specifically recommended by APA for the training and education of medical psychologists not pursuing prerequisites for prescribing medication.

1. Basic Science: anatomy, & physiology, biochemistry;
2. Neurosciences: neuroanatomy, neurophysiology, neurochemistry;
3. Physical Assessment and Laboratory Exams: physical assessment, laboratory and radiological assessment, medical terminology;
4. Clinical Medicine and Pathophysiology: pathophysiology with emphasis on the principal physiological systems, clinical medicine, differential diagnosis, clinical correlation and case studies, chemical dependency, chronic pain management;
5. Clinical and Research Pharmacology and Psychopharmacology: pharmacology, clinical pharmacology, pharmacogenetics, psychopharmacology, developmental psychopharmacology;
6. Clinical Pharmacotherapeutics: professional, ethical and legal issues, combined therapies and their interactions, computer-based aids to practice, pharmacoepidemiology;
7. Research: methodology and design of psychopharmacology research, interpretation and evaluation, FDA drug development and other regulatory processes.

The 2006 APA recommendations also include supervised clinical experience intended to integrate the above seven knowledge domains and assess competencies in skills and applied knowledge.

The national psychology practitioner association (NAPPP; www.nappp.org) and national certifying body (Academy of Medical Psychology; www.amphome.org) have established the national training, examination, and specialty practice criteria and guidelines in the specialty of medical psychology and have established a national journal in the specialty. Such certifying bodies view psychopharmacology training (either to prescribe or consult) as one component of the training of a specialist in medical psychology, but recognize that training and specialized skills in other aspects of the treatment of behavioral aspects of medical illness and mental illness affecting physical illness is essential to practice at the specialty level in medical psychology.

== See also ==
- Prescriptive authority for psychologists movement
- Health psychology
- Rehabilitation psychology
- Psychiatry
- Pain Psychology
- Medical ethics
