= Samuel Sears =

American professor of health psychology

Samuel F. Sears Jr.
- Born: Orlando, Florida, United States
- Education: University of Florida
- Known for: Designing psychological coping strategies for ICD patients and their spouses
- Spouse: Staci Evans
- Children: Jackson, Brandon
- Awards: Early Contributions to Psychology Award (1998; Florida Psychological Association), O. Max Gardner Award
- Scientific career
- Fields: Health psychology
- Workplaces: East Carolina University, University of Florida

Samuel F. Sears Jr. is a professor of health psychology at East Carolina University (Greenville, NC).

== Early life and clinical training ==
Sears was born in Orlando, Florida and raised in its surrounding suburbs. He graduated from Lake Brantley High School in 1986 and enrolled at the University of Florida. He was a walk-on football player before incurring multiple injuries. These injuries prompted him to examine the psychological aspects of health and recovery as a psychology major. He further pursued these studies in the Department of Clinical and Health Psychology at the University of Florida, where he obtained his Ph.D. and was later hired onto the faculty. He served as an assistant professor and later as an associate professor for 12 years. During his time at the University of Florida, he established the first cardiac psychology laboratory at that university.
