= John Weinman =

British psychologist

John Alfred Weinman
- Born: 6 July 1945
- Education: University College London, UCL Queen Square Institute of Neurology
- Known for: Illness perception
- Awards: Honorary Fellow, British Psychological Society
- Scientific career
- Fields: Health psychology
- Workplaces: King's College London
- Thesis: Cognitive and non-cognitive determinants of performance on a perceptual problem-solving task : a computer based study (1978)

John Alfred Weinman is a British psychologist who has been prominent in the development of the field of health psychology.

== Career ==
In 1974, Weinman was appointed as a lecturer in psychology at Guy's Hospital Medical School, London and was subsequently promoted to Professor of Psychology as Applied to Medicine. His unit was integrated into the Institute of Psychiatry, Psychology and Neuroscience of King's College London with which the medical school merged. He retired in 2015 and was granted the title of emeritus professor. He also held a position in the School of Cancer & Pharmaceutical Sciences where he was co-director of the Centre for Adherence Research & Education.

He has been very active in the development of health psychology within the UK and Europe. In August 1985, Weinman and Marie Johnson wrote to the British Psychological Society and argued there was a need for a Health Psychology Section. The Section was inaugurated at the London Conference of the Society.

He was the founding editor of Psychology & Health: an international journal.

== Research ==
A primary focus of his research has been on the ways in which patients' beliefs about their illness and treatment affect self-regulation and self-management of physical health problems. In this area he led the development of what has become the most widely used measure of cognitive representation of illness (Weinman et al., 1995; Moss-Morris et al., 2002).

He has also conducted research on understanding the reasons underlying non-adherence to treatment, and in developing effective interventions for improving use of medicines and other recommended treatments.

== Awards ==
- Lifetime Achievement Award, British Psychological Society.
- Honorary Fellowship, British Psychological Society
- Fellow, European Health Psychology Society
- Fellow, Academy of Social Sciences
- Fellow, Academy of Behavioral Medicine Research
- Honorary DSc, University of Brighton,
- Honorary Professorships at the Universities of Aarhus and Galway

== Key publications ==
- Weinman, J., Petrie, K.J., Moss-Morris, R., & Horne, R. (1996). "The Illness Perception Questionnaire: A new method for assessing the cognitive representation of illness". Psychology and Health, 11(3), 431–445.
- Moss-Morris, R., Weinman, J., Petrie, K, Horne, R., Cameron, L., & Buick, D. (2002). "The revised illness perception questionnaire (IPQ-R)". Psychology & Health, 17(1), 1–16.
