= David Macht =

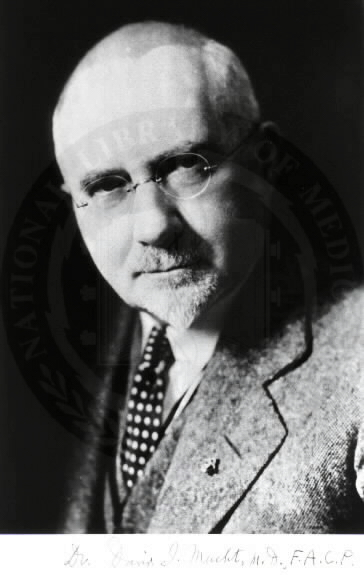
David Macht

David Israel Macht (February 14, 1882 – October 14, 1961) was a pharmacologist and Doctor of Hebrew Literature, responsible for many contributions to pharmacology during the first half of the 20th century.

Born in Moscow in 1882, Macht moved to Baltimore in 1892, age 10. He was awarded a bachelor's and a medical degree by Johns Hopkins University in 1905, and took postgraduate courses in Berlin, Munich and Vienna. He returned to America in 1909 to join the teaching staff at Johns Hopkins. He rose to the position of assistant professor, lecturing in pharmacology from 1912 to 1932. His grandson, Kenneth Lasson, would later report that at that time Johns Hopkins had a faculty quota limiting the number of Jewish staff that could proceed to full faculty.

In 1928 Macht received the first degree of advanced research awarded at Yeshiva College, New York, being made Doctor of Hebrew Literature. From 1933 to 1941 he served as visiting professor of general physiology at Yeshiva College.

From 1944 Macht was a consultant in pharmacology at Sinai Hospital in Baltimore until he had a stroke in 1957. He died four years later at the same hospital. Currently, Johns Hopkins honors Dr. Macht via the David I. Macht award.

== Contributions to medicine ==
Macht published over 900 scientific studies, and three books. He introduced a number of new methods of treatment of diseases. His contributions include:

- Discovered the use of ephedrine as a substitute for cocaine.
- Distinguished the sedative effect of morphine and codeine on the respiratory system from the stimulant effect of other narcotic drugs.
- Proved X-rays of varying wavelengths produced different biological effects.
- Developed a cure for pemphigus using "deep" X-Rays.
- Studies of the thromboplastic (blood clotting) effects of various agents, including antibodies.
- Extensive research into the pharmacology of blood and spinal fluid of psychotic patients.
- Research into the pharmacological applications of cobra venom.

The term "psychopharmacology" (the branch of science concerned with the way drugs affect the mind and behaviour) was coined by Macht in 1920.

== Phytopharmacology ==
Macht was known for his pioneering use of a technique he termed phytopharmacology which involved measuring the effects of drugs on plants. Macht's specific technique was to measure the growth rate of Lupinus albus seedlings when dosed with a test substance, and compare this against a control group of undosed seeds. The relative length of root growth would determine what he called the phytotoxic index, and provide a measure of the toxicity of the substance to the plants.

Macht applied his technique of phytopharmacology to a variety of substances, including the blood of people with medical conditions. In 1930, he reported it could be used to demonstrate the presence of snake venom and menotoxin (a toxin incorrectly thought to be present in the blood of menstruating women). He felt the technique could aid in the differential diagnosis of pernicious anemia, leprosy, pemphigus and other conditions. At the time of his death it was reported that his technique could serve as an indicator of mental illness, since "the blood of persons suffering from certain types of mental illness acts as a poison on species of the European bean".

The use of phytopharmacology as a predictor of toxicity to humans was mainly restricted to the work of Macht and Macht's work was published in the journal Science. Currently, toxicity testing is mostly performed on animal subjects (both live animals and animal tissues), and the detection of individual toxins is performed with mass spectrometry.

While Macht used the term phytopharmacology to refer to the effects of drugs on plants, the term is now only used to refer to the pharmacological usages of plants as medicine.

== Medicine in the Bible ==
Macht was an Orthodox Jew and a Doctor of Hebrew Literature, and he frequently advocated the position that there was a harmonious relationship between religion and science. He studied medical and other descriptions in the Bible and the Talmud, and published many papers that claimed to show that these were accurate descriptions of diseases or treatments. Such papers include:

- "A Pharmacological Appreciation of References to Alcohol in the Hebrew Bible", (1929). In which he compared the effects of alcohol mentioned in the Bible with current medical understanding and concluded "the Book of Books is in complete accord with the most modern and advanced experimental data on the subject".
- "An Experimental Pharmacological Appreciation of Leviticus XI and Deuteronomy XIV" (1953). In which Macht used his phytopharmacology technique on samples of both Levitically clean and unclean animals, and showed a markedly higher phytotoxic index for the unclean meats and the correlation was 100%.
- "A pharmacological appreciation of a biblical reference to mass poisoning, II Kings IV".

== Books ==
- The Holy Incense. A Botanical, Pharmacological, Psychological, and Archaeological Appreciation of the Bible, 1928, Waverly Press, Inc., Baltimore, MD
- Bones and Verdure. An Appreciation of Science in Biblical Expressions, 1943, H.G. Roebuck and Son, Baltimore, MD.
- The Heart and Blood in the Bible, 1951, Boone Press, Baltimore, MD
