= Health Psychology (journal) =

- Discipline: Health psychology
- Language: English
- Edited by: John M. Ruiz

Publication details
- History: 1982-present
- Publisher: American Psychological Association (United States)
- Frequency: Monthly
- Impact factor: 5.556 (2021)

Standard abbreviations
- ISO 4: Health Psychol.

Indexing
- ISSN: 0278-6133 (print); 1930-7810 (web)
- OCLC no.: 07856766

Links
- Journal homepage; Online access

Health Psychology is a monthly, peer-reviewed academic journal published by the American Psychological Association. The journal is "devoted to understanding the scientific relations among psychological factors, behavior and physical health and illness." The editor-in-chief is John M. Ruiz (University of Arizona).

== Abstracting and indexing ==
This journal is abstracted and indexed in:

- EBSCO databases
- CINAHL
- Current Contents
- Embase
- InfoTrac
- MEDLINE/PubMed
- PsycINFO
- Science Citation Index Expanded
- Scopus
- Social Sciences Citation Index

According to the Journal Citation Reports, the journal has a 2021 impact factor of 5.556".

== See also ==
- Journal of Health Psychology
- Occupational health psychology
