= Health psychology =

Study of psychological and behavioral processes in health, illness, and healthcare

Health psychology is the study of psychological and behavioral processes in health, illness, and healthcare. The discipline is concerned with understanding how psychological, behavioral, and cultural factors contribute to physical health and illness. Psychological factors can affect health directly. For example, chronically occurring environmental stressors affecting the hypothalamic–pituitary–adrenal axis, cumulatively, can harm health. Behavioral factors can also affect a person's health. For example, certain behaviors can, over time, harm (smoking or consuming alcohol) or enhance (engaging in exercise) health. Health psychologists take a biopsychosocial approach. In other words, health psychologists understand health to be the product not only of biological processes (e.g., a virus, tumor, etc.) but also of psychological (e.g., thoughts and beliefs), behavioral (e.g., habits), and social processes (e.g., socioeconomic status and ethnicity).

By understanding psychological factors that influence health, and constructively applying that knowledge, health psychologists can improve health by working directly with individual patients or indirectly in large-scale public health programs. In addition, health psychologists can help train other healthcare professionals (e.g., physicians and nurses) to apply the knowledge the discipline has generated, when treating patients. Health psychologists work in a variety of settings: alongside other medical professionals in hospitals and clinics, in public health departments working on large-scale behavior change and health promotion programs, and in universities and medical schools where they teach and conduct research.

Beginning with an initial review article article using Health Psychology in the title, aspects of the field have subsequently been reviewed periodically under this heading. The beginnings of health psychology as a distinct sub-discipline of Psychology can be traced to the fields of clinical psychology and medical psychology applications in medical settings involving psychological assessment and mental health intervention and consultation.

Major professional organizations for the field of health psychology include Society for Health Psychology, Division of Health Psychology of the British Psychological Society (BPS), the European Health Psychology Society (EHPS), and the College of Health Psychologists of the Australian Psychological Society (APS). Advanced credentialing in the US as a clinical health psychologist is provided through the American Board of Professional Psychology. Many of the psychology and health psychology organizations outside the U.S. structure the health psychology around four different divisions. These are clinical health psychology, public health psychology, community health psychology, and critical health psychology, and one related field, occupational health psychology (OHP). In contrast, APA and its constituent Society for Health Psychology (formerly APA Division 38) do not adopt the notion or structure of four divisions of the field. Instead, they officially operationalize the field using Joseph Matarazzo's definition that health psychology as the promotion and maintenance of health through behavioral science, rather than structuring it around theoretical sub-disciplines.

== Overview ==
Advances in psychological, medical, and physiological research led George Engel to conceptualize health and illness as the biopsychosocial model, views health and illness as the product of a combination of factors including biological characteristics (e.g., genetic predisposition), behavioral factors (e.g., lifestyle, stress, health beliefs), and social conditions (e.g., cultural influences, family relationships, social support).

Psychologists who strive to understand how biological, behavioral, and social factors influence health and illness are called health psychologists. Health psychologists use their knowledge of psychology and health to promote general well-being and understand physical illness, and to conduct research in these areas. Health psychologists with clinical psychology training are prepared to help people deal with the psychological and emotional aspects of health and illness. Health psychologists work with many different health care professionals (e.g., physicians, dentists, nurses, physician's assistants, dietitians, social workers, pharmacists, physical and occupational therapists, and chaplains) to conduct research and provide clinical assessments and treatment services. Many health psychologists focus on prevention research and interventions designed to promote healthier lifestyles and try to find ways to encourage people to improve their health. For example, they may help people to lose weight or stop smoking. Health psychologists also use their skills to try to improve the healthcare system. For example, they may advise doctors about better ways to communicate with their patients. Health psychologists work in many different settings including the UK's National Health Service (NHS), private practice, universities, communities, schools and organizations. While many health psychologists provide clinical services as part of their duties, others function in non-clinical roles, primarily involving teaching and research. Leading journals include Health Psychology, the Journal of Health Psychology, the British Journal of Health Psychology, and Applied Psychology: Health and Well-Being. Health psychologists can work with people on a one-to-one basis, in groups, as a family, or at a larger population level.

Health psychology, like other areas of applied psychology, is both a theoretical and applied field. Health psychologists employ diverse research methods. These methods include controlled randomized experiments, quasi-experiments, longitudinal studies, time-series designs, cross-sectional studies, case-control studies, qualitative research as well as action research. Health psychologists study a broad range of health phenomena including cardiovascular disease (cardiac psychology), smoking habits, the relation of religious beliefs to health, alcohol use, social support, living conditions, emotional state, social class, and more. Some health psychologists treat individuals with sleep problems, headaches, alcohol problems, etc. Other health psychologists work to empower community members by helping community members gain control over their health and improve quality of life of entire communities.

=== Clinical health psychology ===
Clinical health psychology (ClHP) is the application of scientific knowledge, derived from the field of health psychology, to clinical questions that may arise across the spectrum of health care. ClHP is one of the specialty practice areas for clinical and health psychologists. It is also a major contributor to the prevention-focused field of behavioral health and the treatment-oriented field of behavioral medicine. Clinical practice includes education, the techniques of behavior change, and psychotherapy. In some countries, a clinical health psychologist, with additional training, can become a medical psychologist and, thereby, obtain prescription privileges.

=== Public health psychology ===
Public health psychology (PHP) is population-oriented. A major aim of PHP is to investigate potential causal links between psychosocial factors and health at the population level. Public health psychologists present research results to educators, policy makers, and health care providers in order to promote better public health. PHP is allied to other public health disciplines including epidemiology, nutrition, genetics and biostatistics. Some PHP interventions are targeted toward at-risk population groups (e.g., undereducated, single pregnant women who smoke) and not the population as a whole (e.g., all pregnant women).

=== Community health psychology ===
Community health psychology (CoHP) investigates community factors that contribute to the health and well-being of individuals who live in communities. CoHP also develops community-level interventions that are designed to combat disease and promote physical and mental health. The community often serves as the level of analysis, and is frequently sought as a partner in health-related interventions. A prominent focus of community health psychology is how to promote and strengthen health systems in communities. By doing so, community health psychologists hope to improve health across generations in a family. This comes with a strong focus in maternal and child care to do so.

=== Critical health psychology ===
Critical health psychology (CrHP) is concerned with the distribution of power and the impact of power differentials on health experience and behavior, health care systems, and health policy. CrHP prioritizes social justice and the universal right to health for people of all races, genders, ages, and socioeconomic positions. A major concern is health inequalities. The critical health psychologist is an agent of change, not simply an analyst or cataloger. A leading organization in this area is the International Society of Critical Health Psychology.

=== Occupational health psychology ===
Occupational health psychology (OHP) brings together aspects of health psychology and industrial and organizational (I-O) psychology as well as occupational medicine. Two of the main research foci of OHP are the development of models of the impact of occupational stress on worker health and job-related interventions to protect employee health and well-being. A number of authors have shown that OHP emerged as a specialty with its own professional organizations. These include the Society for Occupational Health Psychology, the European Academy of Occupational Health Psychology, and the International Commission on Occupational Health's Committee on Work Organization and Psychosocial Factors. A number of journals are associated with OHP, including the Journal of Occupational Health Psychology, Work & Stress, Occupational Health Science, and the International Journal of Stress Management. Adkins documented the application of core principles and competences associated with OHP in improving working conditions, mitigating job stress, and improving worker health in a complex organization.

OHP research focuses on a variety occupations. An occupation that has received considerable attention from OHP researchers is nursing. One approach to stress management among nurses involves the implementation of cognitive-behavioral skills training. This type of training focuses on emotional regulation, assertiveness, and time management.

== Origins and development ==
Health psychology developed in different forms in different societies. Psychological factors in health had been studied since the early 20th century by disciplines such as psychosomatic medicine and later behavioral medicine, but these were primarily either branches of medicine or multidisciplinary fields, and not sub-disciplines of psychology.

=== United States ===
In 1969, William Schofield prepared a report for the APA entitled The Role of Psychology in the Delivery of Health Services. While there were exceptions, he found that the psychological research of the time frequently regarded mental health and physical health as separate, and devoted very little attention to psychology's impact upon physical health. One of the few psychologists working in this area at the time, Schofield proposed new forms of education and training for future psychologists. The APA, responding to his proposal, in 1973 established a task force to consider how psychologists could (a) help people to manage their health-related behaviors, (b) help patients manage their physical health problems, and (c) train healthcare staff to work more effectively with patients.

Health psychology began to emerge as a distinct discipline of psychology in the United States in the 1970s. In the mid-20th century there was a growing understanding in medicine of the effect of behavior on health. For example, the Alameda County Study, which began in the 1960s, showed that people who ate regular meals (e.g., breakfast), maintained a healthy weight, received adequate sleep, did not smoke, drank little alcohol, and exercised regularly were in better health and lived longer. In addition, psychologists and other scientists were discovering relationships between psychological processes and physiological ones. These discoveries include a better understanding of the impact of psychosocial stress on the cardiovascular and immune systems, and the early finding that the functioning of the immune system could be altered by learning.

Led by Joseph Matarazzo, in 1977, APA added a division devoted to health psychology. At the first divisional conference, Matarazzo delivered a speech that played an important role in defining health psychology. He defined the new field in this way, "Health psychology is the aggregate of the specific educational, scientific and professional contributions of the discipline of psychology to the promotion and maintenance of health, the prevention and treatment of illness, the identification of diagnostic and etiologic correlates of health, illness and related dysfunction, and the analysis and improvement of the healthcare system and health policy formation." Similar organizations were established in other countries, including Australia and Japan.

=== Europe ===
In the 1980s there was increasing interest in many European countries in researching psychological aspects of health and illness. In 1986, Stan Maes (1947–2018) of Tilburg University convened a meeting of researchers from Finland, Switzerland, Poland, Czechoslovakia, Italy, Germany, Belgium, Spain, the UK and the Netherlands. Out of this meeting emerged the European Health Psychology Society which began to organise regular conferences (e.g. Trier, 1988; Utrecht, 1989; Oxford, 1990; Lausanne, 1991; and Leipzig, 1992) and published proceedings from these meetings. This society also began to develop its own publications.

=== United Kingdom ===
Psychologists have been working in medical settings for many years (in the UK sometimes the field was termed medical psychology). Medical psychology, however, was a relatively small field, primarily aimed at helping patients adjust to illness. The BPS's reconsideration of the role of the Medical Section prompted the emergence of health psychology as a distinct field. Marie Johnston and John Weinman argued in a letter to the BPS Bulletin that there was a great need for a Health Psychology Section. In December 1986 the section was established at the BPS London Conference, with Marie Johnston as chair. Annual conferences began to be held and began to map out the areas of interest. At the Annual BPS Conference in 1993 a review of "Current Trends in Health Psychology" was organized, and a definition of health psychology as "the study of psychological and behavioural processes in health, illness and healthcare" was proposed.

The Health Psychology Section became a Special Group in 1993 and was awarded divisional status within the UK in 1997. The awarding of divisional status meant that the individual training needs and professional practice of health psychologists were recognized, and members were able to obtain chartered status with the BPS. The BPS went on to regulate training and practice in health psychology until the regulation of professional standards and qualifications was taken over by statutory registration with the Health Professions Council in 2010.

=== Development ===
A number of relevant trends coincided with the emergence of health psychology. One of those trends being the addition of behavioral science to medical school curricula, with courses often taught by psychologists. Another trend of the increased knowledge in health psychology is the training of health professionals in communication skills, with the aim of improving patient satisfaction and adherence to medical treatment. Another impact of the emergence and focus on health psychology are the increasing numbers of interventions based on psychological theory (e.g., behavior modification) and an increased understanding of the interaction between psychological and physiological factors leading to the emergence of psychophysiology and psychoneuroimmunology (PNI). The health domain has also become a target of research by social psychologists interested in testing theoretical models linking beliefs, attitudes, and behavior. Another important impact of the focus on health psychology and its research is the increase of and funding of research in the emergence of AIDS/HIV. The emergence of academic /professional bodies to promote research and practice in health psychology was followed by the publication of a series of textbooks which began to lay out the interests of the discipline.

== Objectives ==
=== Understanding behavioral and contextual factors ===
Health psychologists conduct research to identify behaviors and experiences that promote health, give rise to illness, and influence the effectiveness of health care. They also recommend ways to improve health care policy. Health psychologists have worked on developing ways to reduce smoking in order to promote health and prevent illness. They have also studied the association between illness and individual characteristics. For example, health psychology has found a relation between the personality characteristics of thrill seeking, impulsiveness, hostility/anger, emotional instability, and depression, on one hand, and high-risk driving, on the other.

Health psychology is also concerned with contextual factors, including economic, cultural, community, social, and lifestyle factors that influence health. Physical addiction impedes smoking cessation. Some research suggests that seductive advertising also contributes to psychological dependency on tobacco, although other research has found no relationship between media exposure and smoking in youth. OHP research indicates that people in jobs that combine little decision latitude with a high psychological workload are at increased risk for cardiovascular disease. Other research reveals a relation between unemployment and elevations in blood pressure. Epidemiologic research documents a relation between social class and cardiovascular disease.

Health psychologists also aim to change health behaviors for the dual purpose of helping people stay healthy and helping patients adhere to disease treatment regimens (also see health action process approach). Health psychologists employ cognitive behavioral therapy and applied behavior analysis (also see behavior modification) for that purpose.

=== Preventing illness ===
Health psychologists promote health through behavioral change, as mentioned above; however, they attempt to prevent illness in other ways as well. Health psychologists try to help people to lead a healthy life by developing and running programmes which can help people to make changes in their lives such as stopping smoking, reducing the amount of alcohol they consume, eating more healthily, and exercising regularly. Campaigns informed by health psychology have targeted tobacco use. Those least able to afford tobacco products consume them most. Tobacco provides individuals with a way of controlling aversive emotional states accompanying daily experiences of stress that characterize the lives of deprived and vulnerable individuals. Practitioners emphasize education and effective communication as a part of illness prevention because many people do not recognize, or minimize, the risk of illness present in their lives. Moreover, many individuals are often unable to apply their knowledge of health practices owing to everyday pressures and stresses. A common example of population-based attempts to motivate the smoking public to reduce its dependence on cigarettes is anti-smoking campaigns.

Health psychologists help to promote health and well-being by preventing illness. Some illnesses can be more effectively treated if caught early. Health psychologists have worked to understand why some people do not seek early screenings or immunizations, and have used that knowledge to develop ways to encourage people to have early health checks for illnesses such as cancer and heart disease. Health psychologists are also finding ways to help people to avoid risky behaviors (e.g., engaging in unprotected sex) and encourage health-enhancing behaviors (e.g., regular tooth brushing or hand washing).

Health psychologists also aim at educating health professionals, including physicians and nurses, in communicating effectively with patients in ways that overcome barriers to understanding, remembering, and implementing effective strategies for reducing exposures to risk factors and making health-enhancing behavior changes.

There is also evidence from OHP that stress-reduction interventions at the workplace can be effective. For example, Kompier and his colleagues have shown that a number of interventions aimed at reducing stress in bus drivers has had beneficial effects for employees and bus companies.

=== Illness, disabilities and long-term conditions ===
Health psychologists investigate how disease affects individuals' psychological well-being. An individual who becomes seriously ill or injured faces many different practical stressors. These stressors include problems meeting medical and other bills, problems obtaining proper care when home from the hospital, obstacles to caring for dependents, the experience of having one's sense of self-reliance compromised, gaining a new, unwanted identity as that of a sick person, and so on. These stressors can lead to depression, reduced self-esteem, etc.

The use of medications can alter the microbiome and potentially impact overall health and the development of diseases. It has been discovered that the metabolites produced by intestinal microorganisms can influence one's health. For instance, antidepressants can modify the composition of the intestinal microbiota, which can then affect the course of the disease through changes in specific metabolites produced by certain intestinal microorganisms. This has significant implications, particularly in the context of depression, as it offers new insights into how to approach and treat the condition at hand.

Health psychologists can support people living with long-term conditions to improve or maintain quality of life, self-manage their conditions, and adjust to life with an illness, disability or long-term condition.

Health psychology also concerns itself with bettering the lives of individuals with terminal illness. When there is little hope of recovery, health psychologist therapists can work within a multi-disciplinary palliative care team to improve the quality of life of the patient by helping the patient recover at least some of his or her psychological well-being.

A form of therapy shown in recent studies is psychotherapy. It is used as a mode of intervention due to the inconsistency and issues that may arise from pharmacological interventions. It ensures the use of evidence-based practices and helps in facilitating adherence to medication regimens that may be impacted by psychiatric symptoms, such as low motivation or depressive symptoms. When using psychotherapeutic strategies, clinicians can choose from three modes: individual, family/couples, and group psychotherapy.

=== Critical analysis of health policy ===
Critical health psychologists explore how health policy can influence inequities, inequalities and social injustice. These avenues of research expand the scope of health psychology beyond the level of individual health to an examination of the social and economic determinants of health both within and between regions and nations. The individualism of mainstream health psychology has been critiqued and deconstructed by critical health psychologists using qualitative methods that zero in on the health experience.

=== Conducting research ===
Like psychologists in the other main psychology disciplines, health psychologists have advanced knowledge of research methods. Health psychologists apply this knowledge to conduct research on a variety of questions. For example, health psychologists carry out research to answer questions such as:

- What influences healthy eating?
- How is stress linked to heart disease?
- What are the emotional effects of genetic testing?
- How can we change people's health behavior to improve their health?

=== Teaching and communication ===
Health psychologists can also be responsible for training other health professionals on how to deliver interventions to help promote healthy eating, stopping smoking, weight loss, etc. Health psychologists also train other health professionals in communication skills such as how to break bad news or support behavior change for the purpose of improving adherence to treatment.

== Applications ==
=== Improving doctor–patient communication ===
Health psychologists aid the process of communication between physicians and patients during medical consultations. There are many problems in this process, with patients showing a considerable lack of understanding of many medical terms, particularly anatomical terms (e.g., intestines). One area of research on this topic involves "doctor-centered" or "patient-centered" consultations. Doctor-centered consultations are generally directive, with the patient answering questions and playing less of a role in decision-making. Although this style is preferred by elderly people and others, many people dislike the sense of hierarchy or ignorance that it inspires. They prefer patient-centered consultations, which focus on the patient's needs, involve the doctor listening to the patient completely before making a decision, and involving the patient in the process of choosing treatment and finding a diagnosis.

=== Improving adherence to medical advice ===
Health psychologists engage in research and practice aimed at getting people to follow medical advice and adhere to their treatment regimens. Patients often forget to take their pills or consciously opt not to take their prescribed medications because of side effects. Failing to take prescribed medication is costly and wastes millions of usable medicines that could otherwise help other people. Estimated adherence rates are difficult to measure (see below); there is, however, evidence that adherence could be improved by tailoring treatment programs to individuals' daily lives. Additionally, traditional cognitive-behavioural therapies have been adapted for people with chronic illnesses and comorbid psychological distress to include modules that encourage, support and reinforce adherence to medical advice as part of the larger treatment approach.

==== Ways of measuring adherence ====
Health psychologists have identified a number of ways of measuring patients' adherence to medical regimens:

- Counting the number of pills in the medicine bottle
- Using self-reports
- Using "Trackcap" bottles, which track the number of times the bottle is opened.

=== Managing pain ===
Health psychology attempts to find treatments to reduce or eliminate pain, as well as understand pain anomalies such as episodic analgesia, causalgia, neuralgia, and phantom limb pain. Although the task of measuring and describing pain has been problematic, the development of the McGill Pain Questionnaire has helped make progress in this area. Treatments for pain involve patient-administered analgesia, acupuncture (found to be effective in reducing pain for osteoarthritis of the knee), biofeedback, and cognitive behavior therapy.

== Research areas ==
=== Stress and coping ===
Research on stress, coping, and health examines both the adverse effects of stress and the processes through which people improve, recover, or maintain wellbeing. Topics include biological, psychological, and social pathways linking stress with health, changes in coping across the lifespan, and the influence of social relationships on stress and coping.

== Roles of health psychologists ==
Below are some examples of the types of positions held by health psychologists within applied settings such as the UK's NHS and private practice.

Healthcare professionals who treat individuals with mental health conditions prefer medications that provide energy and have fewer side effects. When prescribing psychiatric drugs, it is essential to consider individual needs, safety, and anti-doping policies. Psychologists patients prefer specific medications like escitalopram for anxiety, melatonin for insomnia, lamotrigine for bipolar disorders, and aripiprazole for psychotic disorders. This emphasizes the importance of personalized prescribing individuals.

- Consultant health psychologist: A consultant health psychologist will take a lead for health psychology within public health, including managing tobacco control and smoking cessation services and providing professional leadership in the management of health trainers.
- Principal health psychologist: A principal health psychologist could, for example lead the health psychology service within one of the leading heart and lung hospitals, providing a clinical service to patients and advising all members of the multidisciplinary team.
- Health psychologist: An example of a health psychologist's role would be to provide health psychology input to a center for weight management. Psychological assessment of treatment, development and delivery of a tailored weight management program, and advising on approaches to improve adherence to health advice and medical treatment.
- Neurological health psychologist: A health psychologist who applies clinical health psychology and clinical neuropsychology principles to the assessment and treatment of neurological conditions. Their work includes cognitive and psychological assessment, rehabilitation, symptom management, health behavior change, and adjustment to neurological illness or injury, with an emphasis on the interactions among brain function, behavior, and physical health.
- Research psychologist: Research health psychologists carry out health psychology research, for example, exploring the psychological impact of receiving a diagnosis of dementia, or evaluating ways of providing psychological support for people with burn injuries. Research can also be in the area of health promotion, for example investigating the determinants of healthy eating or physical activity or understanding why people misuse substances.
- Health psychologist in training/assistant health psychologist: As an assistant/in training, a health psychologist will gain experience assessing patients, delivering psychological interventions to change health behaviors, and conducting research, whilst being supervised by a qualified health psychologist.

== Training ==
=== United States ===
Universities began to develop doctoral-level training programs in health psychology. In the US, post-doctoral level health psychology training programs were established for individuals who completed a doctoral degree in clinical psychology.

=== United Kingdom ===
The term "health psychologist" is a protected title, with health psychologists required to register with the Health Professions Council (HPC) and have trained to a level to be eligible for full membership of the Division of Health Psychology within the BPS. Registered health psychologists who are chartered with the BPS will have undertaken a minimum of six years of training, with three of those years dedicated to health psychology training. Following the completion of a BPS-accredited undergraduate degree in psychology, aspiring health psychologists must first complete a BPS-accredited masters in health psychology (Stage 1 training). Once the trainee has completed Stage 1 training, they can either choose to complete the BPS' independent Stage 2 training route or sign up to an accredited health psychology doctorate program at a UK university (DHealthPsy). Both training routes require trainees to demonstrate they meet the core competencies of:

- professional skills (including implementing ethical and legal standards, communication, and teamwork),
- research skills (including designing, conducting, and analyzing psychological research in numerous areas),
- consultancy skills (including planning and evaluation),
- teaching and training skills (including knowledge of designing, delivering, and evaluating large and small scale training program),
- intervention skills (including delivery and evaluation of behavior change interventions).

At present, there are limited opportunities for trainees to receive fully funded training. The NHS Education Scotland (NES) Stage 2 program funds several trainee health psychologists each year, providing trainees with fixed-term posts within NHS Boards across Scotland. In 2022, a pilot scheme was launched by Health Education England (HEE) to provide similar opportunities to aspiring health psychologists across England.

Once qualified, health psychologists can work in a range of settings, for example the NHS, universities, schools, private healthcare, and research and charitable organizations. A health psychologist in training might be working within applied settings while working towards registration and chartered status. All qualified health psychologists must also engage in and record their continuing professional development (CPD) for psychology each year throughout their career.

=== Australia ===
Health psychologists are registered by the Psychology Board of Australia. The standard pathway to becoming an endorsed health psychologists involves a minimum of six years training and a two-year registrar program. Health psychologists must also undertake continuing professional development (CPD) each year.

=== New Zealand ===
Health psychologists are registered by the New Zealand Psychologists Board within the psychologist scope of practice. The training pathway to becoming a registered health psychologist requires a Masters in Health Psychology and a two-year registration Postgraduate Diploma in Health Psychology at the University of Auckland. Outside of clinical work in primary, secondary and tertiary healthcare settings, graduates may choose careers in research and health promotion in universities and private settings. Health psychologists are able to join the Institute of Health Psychology (IHP), an institute of the New Zealand Psychological Society, as a practitioner, academic or student affiliate.

== See also ==
- Applied psychology
- Behavioral medicine
- Bodymind
- Cardiac psychology
- Chronic stress
- Cognitive epidemiology
- European Academy of Occupational Health Psychology
- Healing environments
- Impact of health on intelligence
- Nutrition psychology
- Occupational health psychology
- Occupational safety and health
- Outline of psychology
- Pediatric psychology
- Perseverative cognition
- Self-concealment
- Society for Occupational Health Psychology
- Workplace stress
- Pain Psychology
