= Pain psychology =

Pain psychology is the study of psychological and behavioral processes in chronic pain. Pain psychology involves implementing psychotherapeutic and behavioral interventions for pain management. Pain psychology can also be regarded as a branch of medical psychology, as many conditions associated with chronic pain have significant medical outcomes. Untreated pain or ineffective treatment of pain can result in symptoms of anxiety and depression; thus, appropriate pain management must occur in a timely fashion following pain onset.

Mental health-related sequelae can develop vis-à-vis persistent pain, may be pre-existing (i.e., premorbid) conditions in individuals with chronic pain, and often worsen over time if unaddressed. This progression frequently prompts referrals to pain healthcare providers, including clinical anesthesiologists, psychiatrists, and physiatrists. Pain psychology emphasizes a holistic approach, focusing on treating the person experiencing pain rather than solely addressing painful sensations themselves. A pain psychologist's role involves assessing and treating underlying mental health conditions—such as anxiety, depression, or trauma—that may contribute to or exacerbate physical pain, thereby aiding patients in developing effective coping strategies and reducing the adverse impact on their overall quality of life.

== Introduction ==
Pain is one of the most common sensations for which individuals seek medical attention. Pain is an uncomfortable physical sensation that may manifest with different presentations. This sensation is a complex experience that involves both physical and psychological components. A variety of biopsychosocial factors, including genetics, emotions, cognitions, and social context, can influence the perception and experience of pain. Coping with intense forms of pain can lead to both clinical psychological dysfunction (e.g., anxiety and mood disorders) and chronic stress. Research has demonstrated that psychological factors can significantly impact human experience of pain, as well. Emotional state plays a critical role—negative emotions like fear and anxiety tend to intensify pain, while positive emotions can alleviate it. Moreover, more complex emotional experiences, such as empathy, which involve both emotional and cognitive components, can also influence how pain is felt and processed. Additionally, executive functions such as attention and memory can modulate pain positively and negatively. Pain perception can impair cognitive abilities, particularly in areas such as working memory. Disruptions to healthy sleep patterns engendered by chronic pain can, in turn, exacerbate pain, lowering pain thresholds and making pain more difficult to manage. People with chronic pain may also overestimate their cognitive and emotional impairments, which further affects their daily functioning.

== Pain and Cognitive Function ==
Cognitive and emotional factors significantly influence pain perception. Brain imaging studies have revealed that attention primarily modulates pain-related activity in the insula and primary somatosensory cortex (S1), while emotional states predominantly affect the anterior cingulate cortex (ACC). The direction of attention has been shown to alter pain intensity, with focus on pain increasing perceived intensity and distraction reducing it. In contrast, emotional states, particularly negative ones, primarily influence the unpleasantness of pain without necessarily changing its perceived intensity. These findings have led to increased interest in mind–body interventions for pain management, including cognitive behavioral therapy, meditation, and relaxation methods (e.g., mindfulness-based pain management), which typically incorporate both attentional and emotional components. The effectiveness of these approaches is supported by evidence showing activation of distinct neural pathways: attention-related pain modulation involves a cortical network including the superior parietal cortex, while emotional modulation engages a pathway through the ACC to the periaqueductal gray matter (PAG) and brainstem.

Pain—whether physical or emotional—acts as a distraction, hindering the ability to focus, retain information, and perform daily tasks. Brain regions like the dorsolateral prefrontal cortex and orbitofrontal cortex, which are involved in pain perception and coping, are often altered in those with chronic pain. These changes are especially pronounced in the Default Mode Network, which plays a key role in working memory and emotional regulation, further impacting pain management and mental health.

Cognitive reserve, which refers to individual differences in cognitive flexibility and abilities, plays a critical role in how people cope with chronic pain. Those with higher cognitive reserve are better able to manage pain and direct their attention, leading to less cognitive and emotional distress. Cognitive reserve can be built and maintained through activities that promote mental engagement, such as physical exercise, social interaction, stress management, a balanced diet, and cognitive training. These strategies not only help chronic pain sufferers cope better with pain, but they also enhance cognitive performance and mental resilience, even in times of stress or distraction. Importantly, these interventions offer benefits not just for those with chronic pain, but for anyone seeking to improve cognitive functioning and reduce the impact of pain.

== Initial Medical Intervention ==
Individuals experiencing chronic pain typically seek consultation with a physician initially. A physician can prescribe medications to manage chronic pain. Some medications, such as acetaminophen, ibuprofen, and certain analgesic topicals, are available over the counter. Conversely, products containing controlled substances, including opioids, require a prescription, as do numerous other pharmacologic agents used to address specific pain conditions and associated symptoms, such as trazodone, gabapentin, and duloxetine. Most medications offer temporary pain relief, and some may carry a risk of addiction. Consequently, it is common for healthcare providers to recommend lifestyle modifications alongside referrals to pain psychologists or therapists for comprehensive treatment.

While individuals experiencing chronic pain typically contact a physician first, a pain psychologist will help address the mental effects that chronic pain causes. According to the American Psychological Association (APA), when a chronic pain patient goes in for treatment from a pain psychologist, they are asked various questions about their mental and physical health, their concerns about the pain they are experiencing, and a questionnaire may follow to keep track of any other information that may be needed to take note of. Once this initial process is complete, a treatment plan is developed specifically to meet the patient's needs.

== Therapeutic Approaches to Pain Management ==
Pain treatments encompass a variety of therapeutic techniques and methods, such as active listening, medication, reflection, empathy, and behavioral techniques like guided imagery or meditation. A common treatment for pain is psychotherapy, also known as talk therapy. It has effectively reduced patients' pain levels, improved their overall life satisfaction, and decreased their reliance on pain medications. For example, a 1998 study involving a group of workers suffering from chronic pain demonstrated that after undergoing psychotherapy, participants experienced significant reductions in depression and other emotional conflicts, along with better management and control of their daily lives. What is learned from therapy sessions can become useful tools for patients to handle future conflicts related to chronic pain from injury and/or surgery.

Pain psychologists offer various mental therapies that include cognitive behavioral therapy (CBT), acceptance and commitment therapy, mindfulness meditation, and relaxation therapies. More specifically, below are some of the components of pain CBT:

1. Biofeedback and relaxation training (e.g., diaphragmatic breathing, progressive muscle relaxation, autogenic training, self-hypnosis, and guided visual imagery) to reduce muscle tension and promote the body's calming response
2. General stress management techniques (e.g., time management, problem-solving skills, and assertive communication)
3. Health promotion (e.g., nutrition, exercise, and sleep hygiene)
4. Anger management skills training
5. Increasing understanding of personality style and its contribution to the pain experience
6. Activity pacing and reducing fear of pain and/or activity avoidance
7. Increasing acceptance of the chronic nature of pain condition
8. Reinforcement (i.e., "operant") techniques to increase adaptive behaviors and decrease maladaptive pain behaviors
9. Cognitive approaches to manage clinical depression and anxiety disorders
10. Cognitive approaches to foster thoughts, emotions, and actions that are adaptive for managing a life with pain

The longevity of seeking pain psychotherapy varies from patient to patient. Some who are experiencing severe psychological issues alongside their medical issues may need to stay in therapy for a little bit longer. It is up to the patient and the psychologist to discuss how extensive the treatment needs to be.

== Prevention ==
Chronic pain is a public health problem that is difficult and costly to treat. This pain can be induced from nerve damage, injury, and even repeated strain. There are very few findings on the prevention of chronic pain. Treatment of acute pain can prevent chronic pain from developing. Many prevention studies suggest oral medications between 1 hour and 1 day prior to surgery. Other studies suggest that pain can be managed through a diet of anti-inflammatory foods. There is an increasing focus on mind-body approaches for pain management, with many chronic pain patients turning to techniques like cognitive behavioral therapy, yoga, meditation, hypnosis, and relaxation exercises to alleviate their discomfort. While these methods are multifaceted, they typically involve both cognitive elements, such as attention control, and emotional components. Research is steadily confirming that these therapies can be effective in reducing both acute pain and the development of chronic pain.
