= Prescriptive authority for psychologists movement =

Movement for changes in authority of psychologists

The prescriptive authority for psychologists (RxP) movement is a movement in the United States of America among certain psychologists to give prescriptive authority to psychologists with predoctoral or postdoctoral graduate-level training in clinical psychopharmacology; successful passage of a standardized, national examination (Psychopharmacology Examination for Psychologists; PEP); supervised clinical experience; or a certificate from the Department of Defense Psychopharmacology Demonstration Project; or a diploma from the Prescribing Psychologists Register (FICPP or FICPPM) to enable them, according to state law, to prescribe psychotropic medications to treat mental disorders. This approach is non-traditional medical training focused on specialized training to prescribe for mental health disorders by a psychologist. It includes rigorous didactics and supervised clinical experience. Legislation pertaining to prescriptive authority for psychologists has been introduced over 180 times in over half of the United States. It has passed in nine states, due largely to substantial lobbying efforts by the American Psychological Association (APA), the largest professional organization of psychologists in the world with over 190,000 members, and various state psychological associations. Prior to RxP legislation and in American states where it has not been passed, this role has been played by psychiatrists, who possess a medical degree and thus the authority to prescribe medication, but more frequently (60-80%) by primary care providers who can prescribe psychotropics, but lack extensive training in psychotropic drugs and in diagnosing and treating psychological disorders. According to the APA, the movement is a reaction to the growing public need for mental health services, particularly in under-resourced areas where patients have little or no access to psychiatrists.

In states where RxP legislation has been passed, psychologists who seek prescriptive authority must possess a doctoral degree (PhD/PsyD), a license to practice independently, and completion of a Master of Science in clinical psychopharmacology (MSCP) degree or equivalent. Programs that offer the MSCP degree are: The California School of Professional Psychology at Alliant International University, The Chicago School, Drake University Fairleigh Dickinson University, Idaho State University, New Mexico State University, and University of Colorado - Denver. Additional MSCP programs are in development. In some jurisdictions, completion of the training programs from the Department of Defense or the Prescribing Psychologists' Register Diplomate Certification also satisfies the licensing law requirements. The supervised clinical experience required after completing the MSCP and passing the PEP varies by jurisdiction, but typically requires a specific number of hours of supervised experience and/or a specific number of patients. Some jurisdictions then grant conditional prescribing psychology licenses or certifications, while others grant full prescribing authority after the supervised clinical experience has been successfully completed. The medications the psychologist may then prescribe are limited to those indicated for psychiatric problems; still, the specific medications that can be prescribed by psychologists vary by jurisdiction.

Psychologists' involvement in pharmacotherapy exists on a continuum, with psychologists serving as prescribers, collaborators, and information-providers in the medical decision-making process. Psychologists may prescribe in seven states: New Mexico, Louisiana, Illinois, Iowa, Idaho, Colorado, Utah, Vermont, and Hawai'i, as well as the Public Health Service, the Indian Health Service, the U.S. military, and the U.S. territory of Guam. When psychologists act only as collaborators, they lack the authority to make the final decision to prescribe; however, they may assist in the process by recommending clinically desirable treatment effects, certain classes of medications, specific medications, dosages, or other aspects of the treatment regimen. Psychologists also provide information that may be relevant to the prescribing professional. Psychologists may express concerns about treatment, refer patients for medication consultations, direct patients to referral or information sources, or discuss with patients how to address their concerns about medication with the prescriber.

== History ==
The first bill seeking to authorize prescription privileges to psychologists was introduced in Hawai'i in 1985 under Hawaii State Resolution 159. The bill would have allowed licensed psychologists there to administer and prescribe psychotropic medication for the treatment of "nervous, mental, and organic brain disorders." Since then, a total of 88 prescriptive authority bills have been introduced in 21 jurisdictions.

In 1988, the U.S. Department of Defense approved a pilot project to train psychologists in issuing psychotropic medications "under certain circumstances." Guam became the first U.S. territory to approve RxP legislation in 1999. New Mexico became the first state to approve RxP legislation in 2002, and Louisiana followed in 2004. In 2014, Illinois became the third state to approve RxP legislation. In 2016, Iowa became the fourth state to grant prescriptive authority, which was followed by Idaho in 2017. The rules and regulations for Illinois' RxP law were approved in 2018 and in 2019 in Iowa. In 2023, Colorado became the sixth state to pass prescriptive authority for psychologists legislation, followed by Utah in 2024. Both Vermont and Hawai'i passed RxP legislation in 2026, becoming the eighth and ninth states, respectively. Many other states have introduced but have yet to approve RxP bills. As of 2026, there are approximately 300-350 active, prescribing psychologists across the United States, with over 275 graduate students and psychologists currently enrolled in an RxP training program. Over 1,500 individuals have completed a master's degree in clinical psychopharmacology and over 500 have passed the PEP.

Since 2000, Division 55 of the American Psychological Association (the Society for Prescribing Psychology), has promoted prescriptive authority for psychologists across the country. Division 55 petitioned APA through its Commission for the Recognition of Specialties and Subspecialties in Professional Psychology (CRSSPP) for official recognition of clinical psychopharmacology as a specialty in psychology. At its meeting in August 2020, the APA Council of Representatives gave final approval to this petition, adding clinical psychopharmacology to 16 other APA-recognized psychological specialties. Division 55 is in the process of becoming a member of the Council of Specialties (CoS) in Professional Psychology, Council of Chairs of Training Councils (CCTC), and helped create a board certification in psychopharmacological psychology, the American Board of Psychopharmacological Psychology (ABRxP), gaining provisional affiliation through the American Board of Professional Psychology (ABPP) in 2025.

The State of New Mexico was the first to enact a Psychologists prescribing law. Louisiana's legislature went on to establish medical psychology as a separate and distinct healthcare profession and transferred the regulation of its practice to the Louisiana State Board of Medical Examiners. The entire practice of psychology for medical psychologists, including psychotherapy and psychological testing, was also transferred to the Louisiana Board of Medical Examiners, effectively making Louisiana the only state in the U.S. where, for some psychologists, a medical board has authority over their entire practice. Because of this, several national organizations, including the American Psychological Association and the Association of State and Provincial Psychology Boards have expressed concern over the practice of psychology being regulated by another profession (i.e., medicine). The Louisiana Psychological Association has strongly echoed such concerns. However, the Louisiana Academy of Medical Psychologists (LAMP), a Political Action Committee representing medical psychologists in the state, strongly endorsed the change of regulation.

Prescribing rights for psychologists are being negotiated in South Africa, Norway, Taiwan, Canada, the United Kingdom, and Australia. In fact, in September 2025, the Canadian province of Ontario's Minister for Health proposed sweeping changes to several health care professions. Included in this proposal was legalizing RxP in Ontario for qualified psychologists, which went through a public consultation period. The proposal will now be considered for legislation and passage by the Ontario legislature.

== APA guidelines ==
In December 2011, the American Psychological Association (APA) published a list of practice guidelines that apply to all prescribing activities, with some also applicable to collaborating and information providing activities. The list is categorized according to the area of psychologists' involvement in pharmacological issues (general, education, assessment, intervention and consultation). The following list summarizes the guidelines by section. These Professional Practice Guidelines were revised and approved by the Council of Representatives in August 2025.

=== General ===
- Guidelines 1 through 3 encourage psychologists to act within the scope of their practice with regards to prescribing psychotropic medications, which includes seeking consultation before recommending certain medications; emphasize that psychologists' evaluate their own views and opinions towards prescribing medications in light of how it may affect communication with patients; and expect that psychologists involved in medication prescription or collaboration be wary of developmental, age, educational, sex, gender, language, health status, and cultural factors involved in populations a psychologist may serve, with regards to pharmacotherapy.

=== Education ===
- Guidelines 4 through 6 require that psychologists attain a level of education specific to pharmacotherapy in order to serve their clients; expect that psychologists be wary of potential adverse side effects of psychotropic medications; and ask that psychologists that prescribe or collaborate with regards to medication prescription be aware of helpful technological resources that are available.

=== Assessment ===
- Guidelines 7 through 9 require that psychologists familiarize themselves with procedures for monitoring the physiological and psychological effects of medications; expect that psychologists who prescribe medications consider other physiological disorders or underlying diseases that the patient may have that could affect the effectiveness of medications; and encourage psychologists to consider issues about patient adherence and concerns about medications.

=== Intervention and consultation ===
- Guidelines 10 through 15 require that psychologists employ a biopsychosocial approach when prescribing medications and that they also use informed consent procedures, act in the best interest of the patient, and consider current research; emphasize that psychologists be wary of commercial influences regarding medications; and encourage psychologists to consider the patient's interpersonal behaviors.

=== Relationships ===
- Guidelines 16 and 17 expect that psychologists maintain appropriate relationships with other providers of psychological services and biological interventions.

== Supporting arguments ==
There are several core arguments put forth by RxP advocates, including the following:

- Other non-physicians have prescription privileges, such as pharmacists, optometrists, nurse practitioners, and physician assistants. Some advocates have asserted that the latter three professions receive less training in clinical pharmacology, therapeutics, and psychopharmacology than many clinical psychologists.
- The statistics point to multiple content areas in which other professions, such as psychiatric nurse practitioners or physician assistants, are relatively deficient in comparison to pharmacologically-trained psychologists’ preparation.
- The training model is supported by a complete lack of legal complaint after eight years regarding the practice of the initial ten psychologists trained by the U.S. Department of Defense. Legal complaints differ from legal suits, as military personnel cannot sue for redress.
- Access to medication would be improved in jurisdictions with long waiting times to see a psychiatrist or other qualified physician.
- The prescriptive authority would be enhanced by the psychologist's doctoral training in the science of psychology, assessment, and psychotherapy. This training is more extensive than that received by the average physician. In addition, the training program for psychologists would provide twice as much pharmacology training than nurse practitioners and physician assistants receive.
- It would address the fact that many lack access to psychiatrists (especially in rural areas).
- It would create a clearer distinction in psychology between doctoral and master-level practitioners, and between doctoral and post-doctoral level practitioners.
- In circumstances in which the psychologist decided not to collaborate with medical colleagues, it could allow the psychologist control of the entire treatment process. In some cases, this might reduce or eliminate complications arising from interprofessional collaboration and potentially save patients money.
- Psychologists with prescriptive authority would add competence to the overall mental health system by adding a resource for general practitioners who need professional consultation regarding psychological disorders and psychotropic medications when a psychiatrist is unavailable.
- Psychopharmacological training allows psychologists to provide better advocacy for their clients.

According to a survey assessing the views of psychology interns, residents, and psychologists published in the journal Professional Psychology: Research and Practice, significant support exists regarding the APA's prescriptive authority initiative. Proponents of the prescriptive authority initiative believe that it would improve the economic stability of the profession, provide better opportunities to underserved populations, and enhance psychologists' clinical skills through a better understanding of biopsychosocial interactions. Support for the prescriptive authority initiative also appears higher amongst those with PsyDs and early career psychologists (within 10 years of receiving doctorate) than those with PhDs and mid- and late-career psychologists. Demographically, females and Caucasians expressed more willingness to seek prescription privileges. Also, those who attended a clinical or counseling graduate program, received a PhD degree, and those employed in a university counseling center, medical school hospital, or independent practice tend to demonstrate higher levels of support for the initiative. In terms of training, an overwhelming majority of those surveyed believe training should begin at the graduate level, but prior to completion of a doctorate. Accordingly, in February 2019, the APA Council of Representatives overwhelmingly voted to approve changes to APA policy that allows psychopharmacology training to begin at the graduate level; previously, APA policy only allowed for this training to occur at the postdoctoral level. In Illinois, one of the jurisdictions where RxP is law, there are already psychopharmacology programs in place that offer this education and training at the predoctoral level. Additionally, respondents preferred that training occur on a part-time basis, be completed within two to two-and-a-half years and cost $12,000-$18,000.

Today, evidence exists to indicate a continual and growing level of support for the American Psychological Association's prescriptive authority initiative. Such support reflects psychologists' willingness to open their minds to learning about psychotropic medications, incorporating pharmacological treatment with therapy, and adapting to the demands of a rapidly changing health care world.

== Opposition ==
Prescriptive authority for psychologists has been controversial, even within the healthcare community, which has created entire organizations dedicated to objecting to prescriptive authority for clinical psychologists. Critics within the medical profession have expressed concerns that psychologists receive no formalized medical training or experience managing medical or pharmacologic aspects of patient care. The current RxP model explicitly states that this movement includes no medical training, but contends that this can be adequately achieved with a master's degree in psychopharmacology, typically from a postdoctoral education program at a professional school. Critics respond that the proposed master's coursework (usually around 450 academic hours) falls vastly short of the training undertaken by psychiatrists (at least 15,000 clinical hours between medical school and residency), and lacks training in direct patient care typical of physician assistant and nurse practitioner programs.

Counter to Opposition

Proponents of the RxP model have rebutted these assertions by describing their lengthy sequence of training (e.g., 4-year undergraduate degree, 5-year doctoral degree, 1-year internship, 1-year residency/fellowship, 2-year master's degree in psychopharmacology, national psychopharmacology exam, supervised clinical experience). In addition, survey research comparing prescribing psychologists' training against that of nurse practitioners and physician assistants has demonstrated that when presented with un-labeled training programs side-by-side, prescribing psychologists' training is perceived to be more rigorous overall than that of psychiatric nurse practitioners or physician assistants/associates in their ability to prescribe psychiatric medication. This perception was found to be true of physicians, mid-level providers, psychologists, non-prescribing therapists, and general members of the public.

== Psychologists who have extensively researched the effects of psychopharmacology ==
- Andrew Feldmár (1940)
- Bruce K. Alexander (1939)
- Betty Eisner (1915–2004)
- Charles R. Schuster (1930 - 2011)
- Corneliu E. Giurgea (1923–1995)
- Duncan B. Blewett (1920-2007)
- James Fadiman (1939)
- Neal M. Goldsmith
- Mitch Earleywine
- Rick Doblin (1953)
- Ralph Metzner (1936-2019)
- Sidney Durward Shirley Spragg (1909-1995)
- Timothy Leary (1920-1996)
