= Psychopharmacology =

Study of the effects of psychoactive drugs

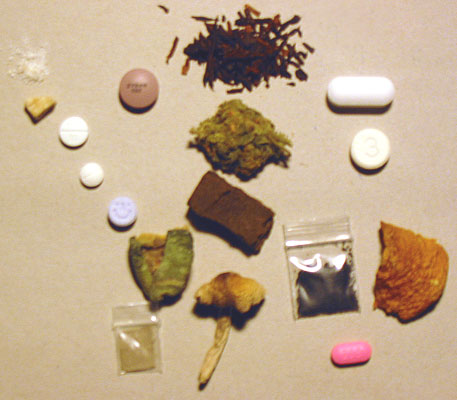
Various psychoactive drugs

Psychopharmacology (from Greek ψυχή, psykhē, 'breath, life, soul'; φάρμακον, pharmakon, 'drug'; and -λογία, -logia) is the scientific study of the effects drugs have on mood, sensation, thinking, behavior, judgment and evaluation, and memory. It is distinguished from neuropsychopharmacology, which emphasizes the correlation between drug-induced changes in the functioning of cells in the nervous system and changes in consciousness and behavior.

The field of psychopharmacology studies a wide range of substances with various types of psychoactive properties, focusing primarily on the chemical interactions with the brain. The term "psychopharmacology" was likely coined by David Macht in 1920. Psychoactive drugs interact with particular target sites or receptors found in the nervous system to induce widespread changes in physiological or psychological functions. The specific interaction between drugs and their receptors is referred to as "drug action", and the widespread changes in physiological or psychological function is referred to as "drug effect". These drugs may originate from natural sources such as plants and animals, or from artificial sources such as chemical synthesis in the laboratory.

== Historical overview ==
=== Early psychopharmacology ===
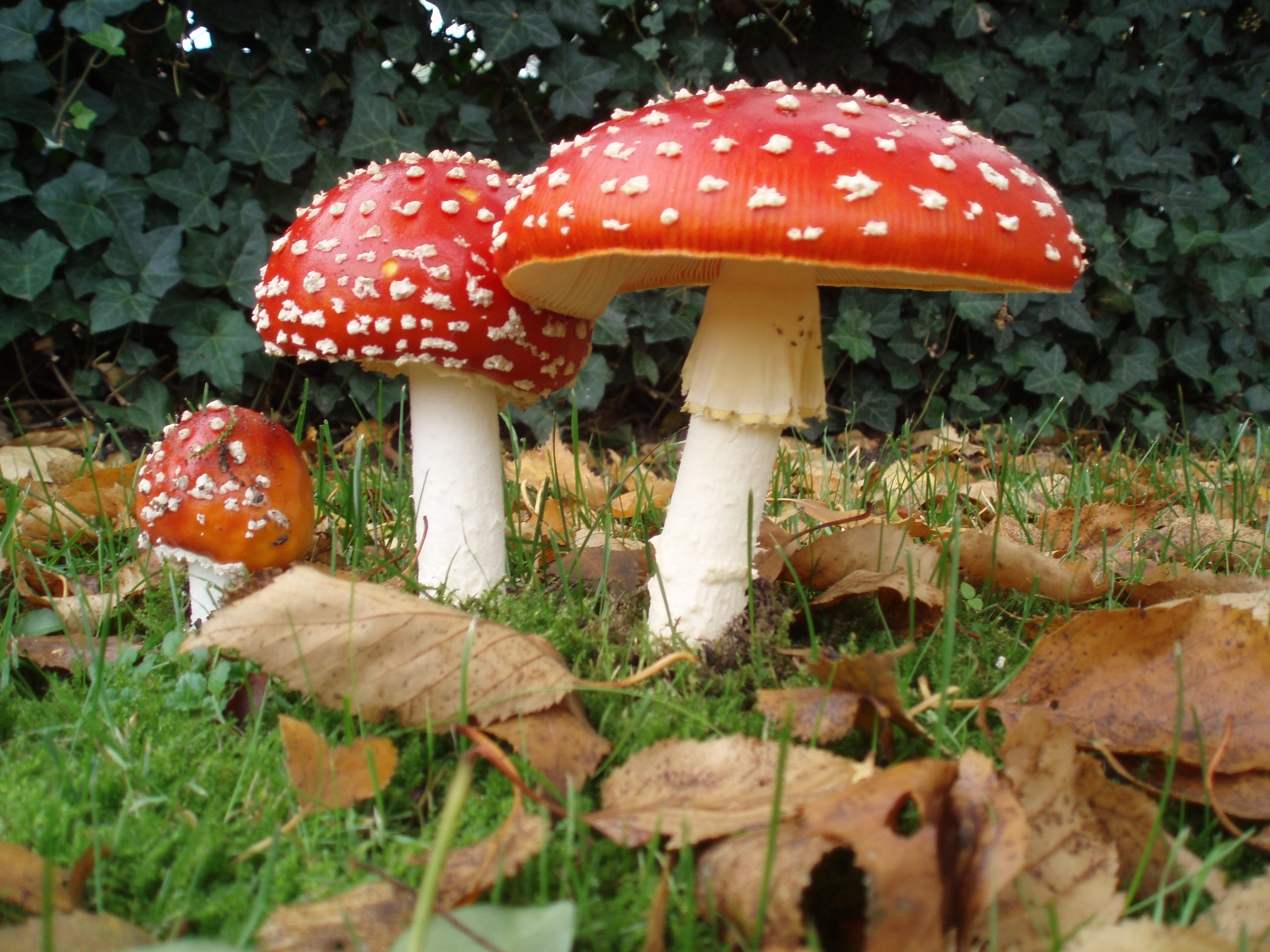
The common muscimol-bearing mushroom Amanita muscaria (fly agaric)

Not often mentioned or included in the field of psychopharmacology today are psychoactive substances not identified as useful in modern mental health settings or references. These substances are naturally occurring, but nonetheless psychoactive, and are compounds identified through the work of ethnobotanists and ethnomycologists (and others who study the native use of naturally occurring psychoactive drugs). However, although these substances have been used throughout history by various cultures, and have a profound effect on mentality and brain function, they have not always attained the degree of scrutinous evaluation that lab-made compounds have. Nevertheless, some, such as psilocybin and mescaline, have provided a basis of study for the compounds that are used and examined in the field today. Hunter-gatherer societies tended to favor hallucinogens, and today their use can still be observed in many surviving tribal cultures. The exact drug used depends on the particular ecosystem a given tribe lives in and is typically found growing wild. Such drugs include various psychoactive mushrooms containing psilocybin or muscimol and cacti containing mescaline and other chemicals, along with myriad other plants containing psychoactive chemicals. These societies generally attach spiritual significance to such drug use and often incorporate it into their religious practices. With the dawn of the Neolithic and the proliferation of agriculture, new psychoactives came into use as a natural by-product of farming. Among them were opium, cannabis, and alcohol derived from the fermentation of cereals and fruits. Most societies began developing herblores, lists of herbs which were good for treating various physical and mental ailments. For example, St. John's wort was traditionally prescribed in parts of Europe for depression (in addition to use as a general-purpose tea), and Chinese medicine developed elaborate lists of herbs and preparations. These and various other substances that have an effect on the brain are still used as remedies in many cultures.

=== Modern psychopharmacology ===
The dawn of contemporary psychopharmacology marked the beginning of the use of psychiatric drugs to treat psychological illnesses. It brought with it the use of opiates and barbiturates for the management of acute behavioral issues in patients. In the early stages, psychopharmacology was primarily used for sedation. With the 1950s came the establishment of lithium for mania, chlorpromazine for psychoses, and then in rapid succession, the development of tricyclic antidepressants, monoamine oxidase inhibitors, and benzodiazepines, among other antipsychotics and antidepressants. A defining feature of this era includes an evolution of research methods, with the establishment of placebo-controlled, double-blind studies, and the development of methods for analyzing blood levels with respect to clinical outcome and increased sophistication in clinical trials. The early 1960s revealed a revolutionary model by Julius Axelrod describing nerve signals and synaptic transmission, which was followed by a drastic increase in biochemical brain research into the effects of psychotropic agents on brain chemistry. After the 1960s, the field of psychiatry shifted to incorporate the indications for and efficacy of pharmacological treatments, and began to focus on the use and toxicities of these medications. The 1970s and 1980s were further marked by a better understanding of the synaptic aspects of the action mechanisms of drugs. However, the model has its critics, too—notably Joanna Moncrieff and the Critical Psychiatry Network.

== Chemical signaling ==
=== Neurotransmitters ===
Psychoactive drugs exert their sensory and behavioral effects almost entirely by acting on neurotransmitters and by modifying one or more aspects of synaptic transmission. Neurotransmitters can be viewed as chemicals through which neurons primarily communicate; psychoactive drugs affect the mind by altering this communication. Drugs may act by 1) serving as a precursor to a neurotransmitter; 2) inhibiting neurotransmitter synthesis; 3) preventing storage of neurotransmitters in the presynaptic vesicle; 4) stimulating or inhibiting neurotransmitter release; 5) stimulating or blocking post-synaptic receptors; 6) stimulating autoreceptors, inhibiting neurotransmitter release; 7) blocking autoreceptors, increasing neurotransmitter release; 8) inhibiting neurotransmission breakdown; or 9) blocking neurotransmitter reuptake by the presynaptic neuron.

=== Hormones ===
The other central method through which drugs act is by affecting communications between cells through hormones. Neurotransmitters can usually only travel a microscopic distance before reaching their target at the other side of the synaptic cleft, while hormones can travel long distances before reaching target cells anywhere in the body. Thus, the endocrine system is a critical focus of psychopharmacology because 1) drugs can alter the secretion of many hormones; 2) hormones may alter the behavioral responses to drugs; 3) hormones themselves sometimes have psychoactive properties; and 4) the secretion of some hormones, especially those dependent on the pituitary gland, is controlled by neurotransmitter systems in the brain.

== Psychopharmacological substances ==
=== Alcohol ===
Alcohol is a depressant, the effects of which may vary according to dosage amount, frequency, and chronicity. As a member of the sedative-hypnotic class, at the lowest doses, the individual feels relaxed and less anxious. In quiet settings, the user may feel drowsy, but in settings with increased sensory stimulation, individuals may feel uninhibited and more confident. High doses of alcohol rapidly consumed may produce amnesia for the events that occur during intoxication. Other effects include reduced coordination, which leads to slurred speech, impaired fine-motor skills, and delayed reaction time. The effects of alcohol on the body's neurochemistry are more difficult to examine than some other drugs. This is because the chemical nature of the substance makes it easy to penetrate into the brain, and it also influences the phospholipid bilayer of neurons. This allows alcohol to have a widespread impact on many normal cell functions and modifies the actions of several neurotransmitter systems. Alcohol inhibits glutamate (a major excitatory neurotransmitter in the nervous system) neurotransmission by reducing the effectiveness at the NMDA receptor, which is related to memory loss associated with intoxication. It also modulates the function of GABA, a major inhibitory amino acid neurotransmitter. Abuse of alcohol has also been correlated with thiamine deficiencies within the brain, leading to lasting neurological conditions that affect primarily the ability of the brain to effectively store memories. One such neurological condition is called Korsakoff's syndrome, for which very few effective treatment modalities have been found. The reinforcing qualities of alcohol leading to repeated use – and thus also the mechanisms of withdrawal from chronic alcohol use – are partially due to the substance's action on the dopamine system. This is also due to alcohol's effect on the opioid systems, or endorphins, that have opiate-like effects, such as modulating pain, mood, feeding, reinforcement, and response to stress.

=== Antidepressants ===
Antidepressants reduce symptoms of mood disorders primarily through the regulation of norepinephrine and serotonin (particularly the 5-HT receptors). After chronic use, neurons adapt to the change in biochemistry, resulting in a change in pre- and postsynaptic receptor density and second messenger function. The Monoamine Theory of Depression and Anxiety states that the disruption of the activity of monoamines, which are nitrogen containing neurotransmitters (i.e. serotonin, norepinephrine, and dopamine) is strongly correlated with the presence of depressive symptoms. Despite its longstanding prominence in pharmaceutical advertising, the suggestion that low serotonin levels cause depression is not supported by scientific evidence.

Monoamine oxidase inhibitors (MAOIs) are the oldest class of antidepressants. They inhibit monoamine oxidase, the enzyme that metabolizes the monoamine neurotransmitters in the presynaptic terminals that are not contained in protective synaptic vesicles. The inhibition of the enzyme increases the amount of neurotransmitter available for release. It increases norepinephrine, dopamine, and serotonin, thus increasing the action of the transmitters at their receptors. MAOIs have been somewhat disfavored because of their reputation for more serious side effects.

Tricyclic antidepressants (TCAs) work through binding to the presynaptic transporter proteins and blocking the reuptake of norepinephrine or serotonin into the presynaptic terminal, prolonging the duration of transmitter action at the synapse.

Selective serotonin reuptake inhibitors (SSRIs) selectively block the reuptake of serotonin (5-HT) through their inhibiting effects on the sodium/potassium ATP-dependent serotonin transporter in presynaptic neurons. This increases the availability of 5-HT in the synaptic cleft. The main parameters to consider in choosing an antidepressant are side effects and safety. Most SSRIs are available generically and are relatively inexpensive. Older antidepressants such as TCAs and MAOIs usually require more visits and monitoring, which may offset the low expense of the drugs. SSRIs are relatively safe in overdoses and better tolerated than TCAs and MAOIs for most patients.

=== Antipsychotics ===
All proven antipsychotics are postsynaptic dopamine receptor blockers (dopamine antagonists). For an antipsychotic to be effective, it generally requires a dopamine antagonism of 60%–80% of dopamine D_{2} receptors.

First generation (typical) antipsychotics: Traditional neuroleptics modify several neurotransmitter systems, but their clinical effectiveness is most likely due to their ability to antagonize dopamine transmission by competitively blocking the receptors or by inhibiting dopamine release. The most serious and troublesome side effects of these classical antipsychotics are movement disorders that resemble the symptoms of Parkinson's disease, because the neuroleptics antagonize dopamine receptors broadly, also reducing the normal dopamine-mediated inhibition of cholinergic cells in the striatum.

Second-generation (atypical) antipsychotics: The concept of "atypicality" is from the finding that second generation antipsychotics (SGAs) have a greater serotonin/dopamine ratio than earlier drugs, and might be associated with improved efficacy (particularly for the negative symptoms of psychosis) and reduced extrapyramidal side effects. Some of the efficacy of atypical antipsychotics may be due to 5-HT_{2} antagonism or the blockade of other dopamine receptors. Agents that purely block 5-HT_{2} or dopamine receptors other than D_{2} have often failed as effective antipsychotics.

=== Benzodiazepines ===
Benzodiazepines are often used to reduce anxiety symptoms, muscle tension, seizure disorders, insomnia, symptoms of alcohol withdrawal, and panic attack symptoms. Their action is primarily on specific benzodiazepine sites on the GABA_{A} receptor. This receptor complex is thought to mediate the anxiolytic, sedative, and anticonvulsant actions of the benzodiazepines. Use of benzodiazepines carries the risk of tolerance (necessitating increased dosage), dependence, and abuse. Taking these drugs for a long period of time can lead to severe withdrawal symptoms upon abrupt discontinuation.

=== Hallucinogens ===
==== Classical serotonergic psychedelics ====
Psychedelics cause perceptual and cognitive distortions without delirium. The state of intoxication is often called a "trip". Onset is the first stage after an individual ingests (LSD, psilocybin, ayahuasca, and mescaline) or smokes (dimethyltryptamine) the substance. This stage may consist of visual effects, with an intensification of colors and the appearance of geometric patterns that can be seen with one's eyes closed. This is followed by a plateau phase, where the subjective sense of time begins to slow and the visual effects increase in intensity. The user may experience synesthesia, a crossing-over of sensations (for example, one may "see" sounds and "hear" colors). These outward sensory effects have been referred to as the "mystical experience", and current research suggests that this state could be beneficial to the treatment of some mental illnesses, such as depression and possibly addiction. In instances where some patients have seen a lack of improvement from the use of antidepressants, serotonergic hallucinogens have been observed to be rather effective in treatment. In addition to the sensory-perceptual effects, hallucinogenic substances may induce feelings of depersonalization, emotional shifts to a euphoric or anxious/fearful state, and a disruption of logical thought. Hallucinogens are classified chemically as either indolamines (specifically tryptamines), sharing a common structure with serotonin, or as phenethylamines, which share a common structure with norepinephrine. Both classes of these drugs are agonists at the 5-HT_{2} receptors; this is thought to be the central component of their hallucinogenic properties. Activation of 5-HT_{2A} may be particularly important for hallucinogenic activity. However, repeated exposure to hallucinogens leads to rapid tolerance, likely through down-regulation of these receptors in specific target cells. Research suggests that hallucinogens affect many of these receptor sites around the brain and that through these interactions, hallucinogenic substances may be capable of inducing positive introspective experiences. The current research implies that many of the effects that can be observed occur in the occipital lobe and the frontomedial cortex; however, they also present many secondary global effects in the brain that have not yet been connected to the substance's biochemical mechanism of action.

==== Dissociative hallucinogens ====
Another class of hallucinogens, known as dissociatives, includes drugs such as ketamine, phencyclidine (PCP), and Salvia divinorum. Drugs such as these are thought to interact predominantly with glutamate receptors within the brain. Specifically, ketamine is thought to block NMDA receptors that are responsible for signalling in the glutamate pathways. Ketamine's more tranquilizing effects can be seen in the central nervous system through interactions with parts of the thalamus by inhibition of certain functions. Ketamine has become a major drug of research for the treatment of depression. These antidepressant effects are thought to be related to the drug's action on the glutamate receptor system and the relative spike in glutamate levels, as well as its interaction with mTOR, which is an enzymatic protein involved in catabolic processes in the human body. Phencyclidine's biochemical properties are still mostly unknown; however, its use has been associated with dissociation, hallucinations, and in some cases seizures and death. Salvia divinorum, a plant native to Mexico, has strong dissociative and hallucinogenic properties when the dry leaves are smoked or chewed. The qualitative value of these effects, whether negative or positive, has been observed to vary between individuals with many other factors to consider.

=== Hypnotics ===
Hypnotics are often used to treat the symptoms of insomnia or other sleep disorders. Benzodiazepines are still among the most widely prescribed sedative-hypnotics in the United States today. Certain non-benzodiazepine drugs are used as hypnotics as well. Although they lack the chemical structure of the benzodiazepines, their sedative effect is similarly through action on the GABA_{A} receptor. They also have a reputation of being less addictive than benzodiazepines. Melatonin, a naturally occurring hormone, is often used over the counter (OTC) to treat insomnia and jet lag. This hormone appears to be excreted by the pineal gland early during the sleep cycle and may contribute to human circadian rhythms. Because OTC melatonin supplements are not subject to careful and consistent manufacturing, more specific melatonin agonists are sometimes preferred. They are used for their action on melatonin receptors in the suprachiasmatic nucleus, responsible for sleep-wake cycles. Many barbiturates have or had an FDA-approved indication for use as sedative-hypnotics, but have become less widely used because of their limited safety margin in overdose, their potential for dependence, and the degree of central nervous system depression they induce. The amino-acid L-tryptophan is also available OTC, and seems to be free of dependence or abuse liability. However, it is not as powerful as the traditional hypnotics. Because of the possible role of serotonin in sleep patterns, a new generation of 5-HT_{2} antagonists are in current development as hypnotics.

=== Cannabis and the cannabinoids ===
Cannabis consumption produces a dose-dependent state of intoxication in humans. There is commonly increased blood flow to the skin, which leads to an increased heart rate and sensations of warmth or flushing. It also frequently induces increased hunger. Iversen (2000) categorized the subjective and behavioral effects often associated with cannabis into three stages. The first is the "buzz", a brief period of initial responding where the main effects are lightheadedness or slight dizziness, in addition to possible tingling sensations in the extremities or other parts of the body. The "high" is characterized by feelings of euphoria and exhilaration characterized by mild psychedelia as well as a sense of disinhibition. If the individual has taken a sufficiently large dose of cannabis, the level of intoxication progresses to the stage of being "stoned", and the user may feel calm, relaxed, and possibly in a dreamlike state. Sensory reactions may include the feeling of floating, enhanced visual and auditory perception, visual illusions, or the perception of the slowing of time passage, which are somewhat psychedelic in nature.

There exist two primary CNS cannabinoid receptors, on which marijuana and the cannabinoids act. Both the CB_{1} and CB_{2} receptor are found in the brain. The CB_{2} receptor is also found in the immune system. CB_{1} is expressed at high densities in the basal ganglia, cerebellum, hippocampus, and cerebral cortex. Receptor activation can inhibit cAMP formation, inhibit voltage-sensitive calcium ion channels, and activate potassium ion channels. Many CB_{1} receptors are located on axon terminals, where they act to inhibit the release of various neurotransmitters. In combination, these chemical actions work to alter various functions of the central nervous system, including the motor system, memory, and various cognitive processes.

=== Opioids ===
The opioid category of drugs – including drugs such as heroin, morphine, and oxycodone – belong to the class of narcotic analgesics, which reduce pain without producing unconsciousness but do produce a sense of relaxation and sleep, and at high doses may result in coma and death. The ability of opioids (both endogenous and exogenous) to relieve pain depends on a complex set of neuronal pathways at the spinal cord level, as well as various locations above the spinal cord. Small endorphin neurons in the spinal cord act on receptors to decrease the conduction of pain signals from the spinal cord to higher brain centers. Descending neurons originating in the periaqueductal gray give rise to two pathways that further block pain signals in the spinal cord. The pathways begin in the locus coeruleus (noradrenaline) and the nucleus of raphe (serotonin). Similar to other abused substances, opioid drugs increase dopamine release in the nucleus accumbens. Opioids are more likely to produce physical dependence worse than that of other classes of psychoactive drugs, and can lead to painful withdrawal symptoms if discontinued abruptly after regular use.

=== Stimulants ===
Cocaine is one of the more common stimulants and is a complex drug that interacts with various neurotransmitter systems. It commonly causes heightened alertness, increased confidence, feelings of exhilaration, reduced fatigue, and a generalized sense of well-being. The effects of cocaine are similar to those of amphetamines, though cocaine tends to have a shorter duration of effect. In high doses or with prolonged use, cocaine can result in a number of negative effects, including irritability, anxiety, exhaustion, total insomnia, and even psychotic symptomatology. Most of the behavioral and physiological actions of cocaine can be explained by its ability to block the reuptake of the two catecholamines, dopamine and norepinephrine, as well as serotonin. Cocaine binds to transporters that normally clear these transmitters from the synaptic cleft, inhibiting their function. This leads to increased levels of neurotransmitter in the cleft and transmission at the synapses. Based on in-vitro studies using rat brain tissue, cocaine binds most strongly to the serotonin transporter, followed by the dopamine transporter, and then the norepinephrine transporter.

Amphetamines tend to cause the same behavioral and subjective effects of cocaine. Various forms of amphetamine are commonly used to treat the symptoms of attention deficit hyperactivity disorder (ADHD) and narcolepsy, or are used recreationally. Amphetamine and methamphetamine are indirect agonists of the catecholaminergic systems. They block catecholamine reuptake, in addition to releasing catecholamines from nerve terminals. There is evidence that dopamine receptors play a central role in the behavioral responses of animals to cocaine, amphetamines, and other psychostimulant drugs. One action causes the dopamine molecules to be released from inside the vesicles into the cytoplasm of the nerve terminal, which are then transported outside by the mesolimbic dopamine pathway to the nucleus accumbens. This plays a key role in the rewarding and reinforcing effects of cocaine and amphetamine in animals, and is the primary mechanism for amphetamine dependence.

== Psychopharmacological research ==
In psychopharmacology, researchers are interested in any substance that crosses the blood–brain barrier and thus has an effect on behavior, mood, or cognition. Drugs are researched for their physiochemical properties, physical side effects, and psychological side effects. Researchers in psychopharmacology study a variety of different psychoactive substances, including alcohol, cannabinoids, club drugs, psychedelics, opiates, nicotine, caffeine, psychomotor stimulants, inhalants, and anabolic–androgenic steroids. They also study drugs used in the treatment of affective and anxiety disorders, as well as schizophrenia.

Clinical studies are often very specific, typically beginning with animal testing and ending with human testing. In the human testing phase, there is often a group of subjects: one group is given a placebo, and the other is administered a carefully measured therapeutic dose of the drug in question. After all of the testing is completed, the drug is proposed to the concerned regulatory authority (e.g. the U.S. FDA), and is either commercially introduced to the public via prescription, or deemed safe enough for over-the-counter sale.

Though particular drugs are prescribed for specific symptoms or syndromes, they are usually not specific to the treatment of any single mental disorder.

A somewhat controversial application of psychopharmacology is "cosmetic psychiatry": persons who do not meet criteria for any psychiatric disorder are nevertheless prescribed psychotropic medication. The antidepressant bupropion is then prescribed to increase perceived energy levels and assertiveness while diminishing the need for sleep. The antihypertensive compound propranolol is sometimes chosen to eliminate the discomfort of day-to-day anxiety. Fluoxetine in nondepressed people can produce a feeling of generalized well-being. Pramipexole, a treatment for restless leg syndrome, can dramatically increase libido in women. These and other off-label lifestyle applications of medications are not uncommon. Although occasionally reported in the medical literature, no guidelines for such usage have been developed. There is also a potential for the misuse of prescription psychoactive drugs by elderly persons, who may have multiple drug prescriptions.

== See also ==
- Pharmacology
- Neuropharmacology
- Neuropsychopharmacology
- Psychiatry
- History of pharmacy
- Mental health
- Recreational drug use
- Nathan S. Kline
- Prescriptive authority for psychologists movement
