= Rita Charon =

American physician

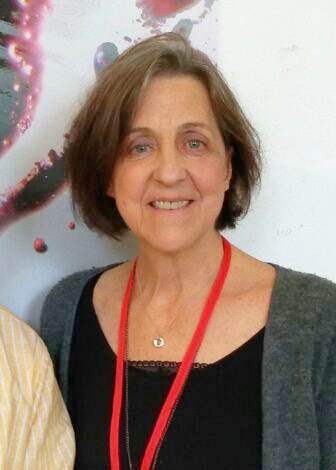
- Born: 1949 (age 76–77); Providence, Rhode Island, U.S.
- Occupation: Medical doctor

Rita Charon (born 1949 in Providence, Rhode Island), is a physician, literary scholar and the founder and executive director of the Program in Narrative Medicine at Columbia University. She currently practices as a general internist at the Associates in Internal Medicine at Columbia Presbyterian Hospital, and is a professor of clinical medicine at the College of Physicians and Surgeons of Columbia University.

Charon is the author of Narrative Medicine: Honoring the Stories of Illness and co-editor of Stories Matter: The Role of Narrative in Medical Ethics and Psychoanalysis and Narrative Medicine.

== Biography ==
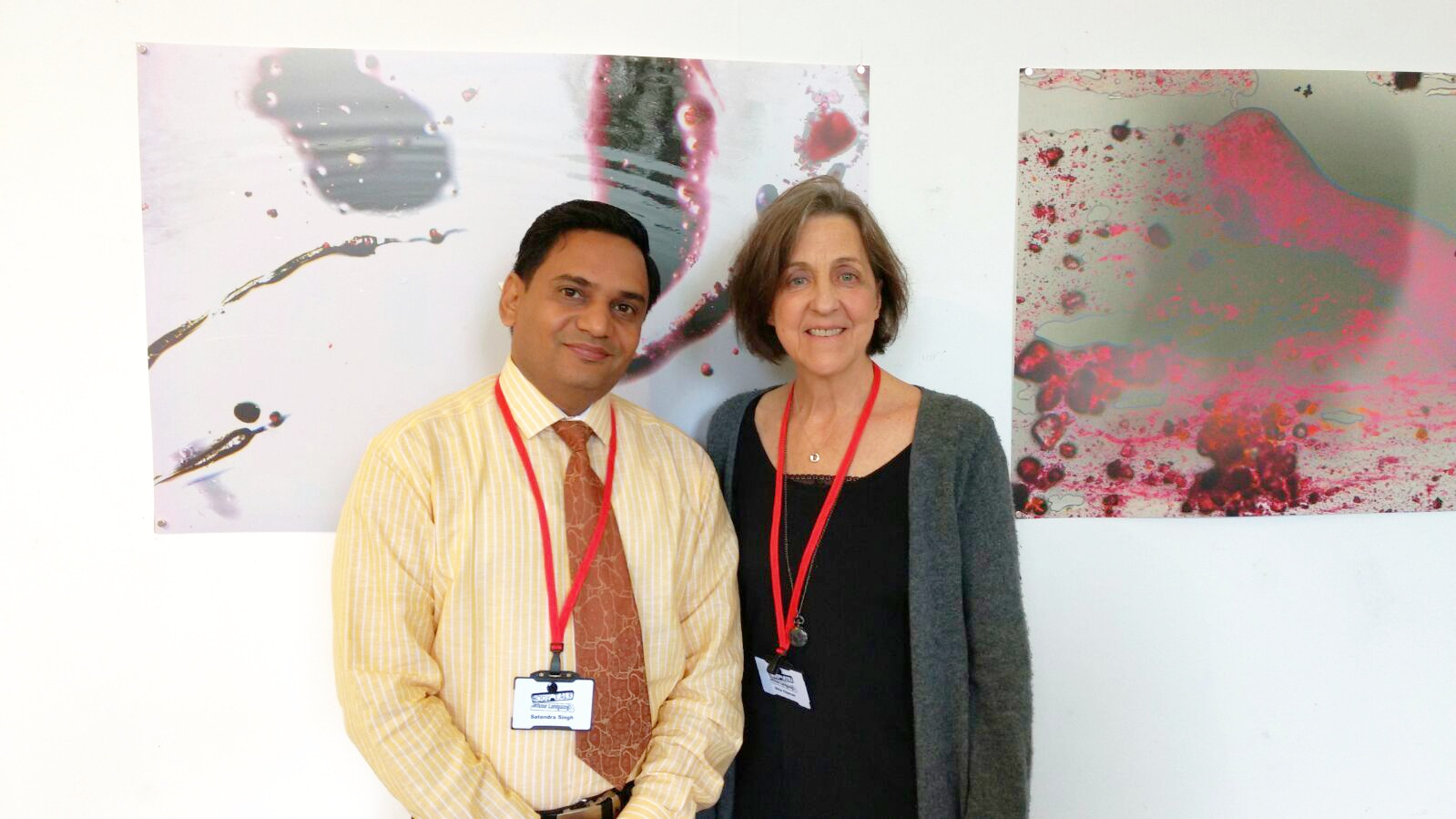
Charon at the Association for Medical Humanities Conference, London, 2016

Charon was born in Providence, Rhode Island and credits her father, a physician serving the French-Canadian population there, as her inspiration to go into medicine. She graduated with a B.A. in biology and child education from the Experimental College of Fordham University in 1970, and after working as a teacher and peace activist, attended Harvard Medical School from 1974 to 1978, where she obtained her MD degree. She completed her residency in internal medicine at the Residency Program in Social Medicine at the Montefiore Medical Center in the Bronx, New York.

Charon began teaching at Columbia University College of Physicians and Surgeons in 1982 and was appointed full professor in 2001. She also completed a doctorate in English from Columbia University in 1999, focusing her studies on the writing of Henry James and the role of literature in medicine.

In 2000, she founded the Program in Narrative Medicine at Columbia, which launched the Master of Science in Narrative Medicine, the first graduate program of its kind, in 2009.

She currently directs the Narrative Medicine curriculum for Columbia Medical School and teaches literature, narrative ethics, and life-telling, both in the medical center and to students in the Narrative Medicine master's degree program. She has published and lectured extensively, both nationally and internationally, on the ways in which narrative training helps to increase empathy and reflection in health professionals and students. Her literary scholarship focuses on the novels and tales of Henry James. Her research projects center on the outcomes of training health care professionals in narrative competence and the development of narrative clinical routines to increase the capacity for clinical recognition in medical practice.

Charon’s research is supported by the NIH, the NEH, the Veterans Administration, the Josiah Macy Jr. Foundation, and several other private foundations.

== Awards ==
Her work in narrative medicine has been recognized by the Association of American Medical Colleges, the American College of Physicians, the Society for Health and Human Values, the American Academy on Communication in Healthcare, and the Society of General Internal Medicine.

She is the recipient of a Kaiser Faculty Scholar Award, a Rockefeller Foundation Bellagio Residence, and a John Simon Guggenheim Fellowship.

In 1987 she was the first physician to receive Columbia University's Virginia Kneeland Frantz Award for Outstanding Woman Doctor of the Year. She was named Outstanding Woman Physician of the year in 1996, and in 1997 she received the National Award for Innovation in Medical Education from the Society of General Internal Medicine.

In 2011 she was awarded the Alma Dea Morani, M.D. Renaissance Woman Award from the Foundation for the History of Women in Medicine.

Charon was selected as the 2018 Jefferson Lecturer in the Humanities by the National Endowment for the Humanities, and delivered her lecture, "To See the Suffering: The Humanities Have What Medicine Needs," at the Warner Theatre in Washington, D.C., on October 15, 2018.

== Publications ==
- Author of Narrative Medicine: Honoring the Stories of Illness (New York: Oxford University Press, 2006)
- Co-editor of Stories Matter: The Role of Narrative in Medical Ethics (Routledge, 2002)
- Co-editor of Psychoanalysis and Narrative Medicine (SUNY, 2008)
- Co-author of The Principles and Practice of Narrative Medicine (Oxford University Press, 2016).
- Charon was formerly editor-in-chief of the journal Literature and Medicine
- Charon's essays and reviews have appeared in Narrative, Annals of Internal Medicine, Journal of the American Medical Association,JAMA Literature and Medicine, The Lancet, and The New England Journal of Medicine.

== See also ==
- Slow medicine
- Medical humanities
