= Slow medicine =

Medical Practice Movement

Slow medicine is a movement calling for change in medical practice which took inspiration from the wider slow food movement. Practitioners of slow medicine have published several different definitions, but the common emphasis is on the word "slow," meaning to allow the medical practitioner to have sufficient time with the patient. Like the slow food movement, slow medicine calls for more balance, countering the over-emphasis on fast processes which reduce quality.

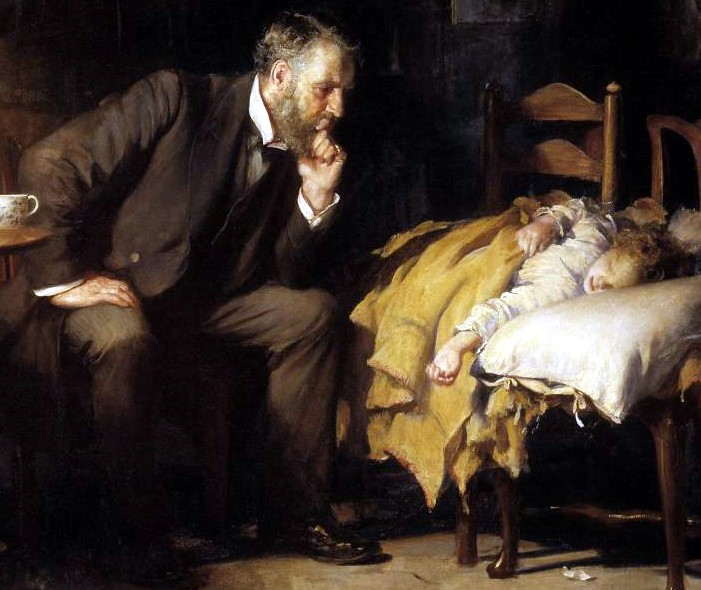
The Doctor by Luke Fildes (detail)

== Development of slow medicine ==
The first mention of slow medicine in print took place in the first decade of the twenty-first century, about fifteen years after the start of the slow food movement in Italy. In the year 2002 an article was published in an Italian medical journal which used the words "slow medicine" to mean an approach to medicine which would allow practitioners sufficient time to evaluate the patient and their wider social context, to reduce anxiety, to evaluate new methods and technologies, to prevent premature release from the hospital and also to provide adequate emotional support. Later, in English-language publications, several physicians independently started using the term slow medicine.

A slow medicine society was formed in Italy in 2011, and the first Italian national conference on slow medicine took place in Turin, Italy, in November 2011. Since that time, slow medicine societies have been formed in other countries.

== Principles of slow medicine ==
Different medical practitioners emphasize different aspects of medicine when using the term "slow medicine." For some, slow medicine means taking time and not rushing when evaluating a patient. For others, slow medicine is a careful evaluation of medical evidence and a desire not to "overdiagnose" or "overtreat." The original Slow Medicine society in Italy points to three key words of being "measured," "respectful" and "equitable," which focuses on the social and political aspects of medicine. One early practitioner of slow medicine sees the patient in the metaphor of a plant which needs to be nourished and for impediments to be removed in order to allow healing to occur.

== See also ==
- Slow movement (culture)
- Narrative medicine
- Victoria Sweet
- Pamela Wible
- Rita Charon
