= Victoria Sweet =

Physician

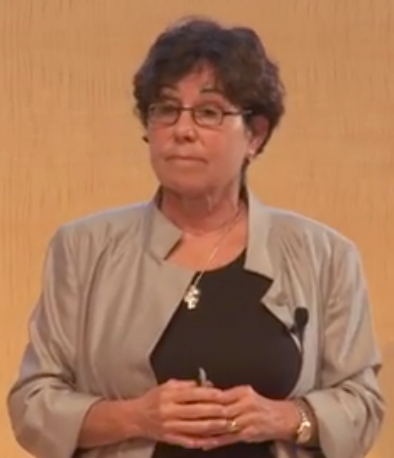
- Giving a talk at the San Francisco Public Library in 2014
- Born: Los Angeles, California, US
- Education: Stanford University; UC Irvine School of Medicine; UC San Francisco
- Known for: "Slow Medicine" medical doctor Historian of medicine

Victoria Sweet is an American physician, author and advocate for what is termed "slow medicine". She is also a historian of medicine who has studied the writings of Hildegard of Bingen, a 12th century German abbess and medical therapist.

== Biography ==
=== Early life ===
Victoria Sweet was born in Los Angeles, California. Her ancestors came to California from Germany in 1836.

=== Education ===
As an undergraduate she studied at Stanford University, where she majored in mathematics, with a minor in the Classics. She received her MD degree in 1977 at age 27 from the University of California Irvine School of Medicine. She received an M.A. degree in 1995 and a Ph.D. degree in 2003, both degrees in History of Health Sciences, from the University of California, San Francisco.

== Work as medical historian ==
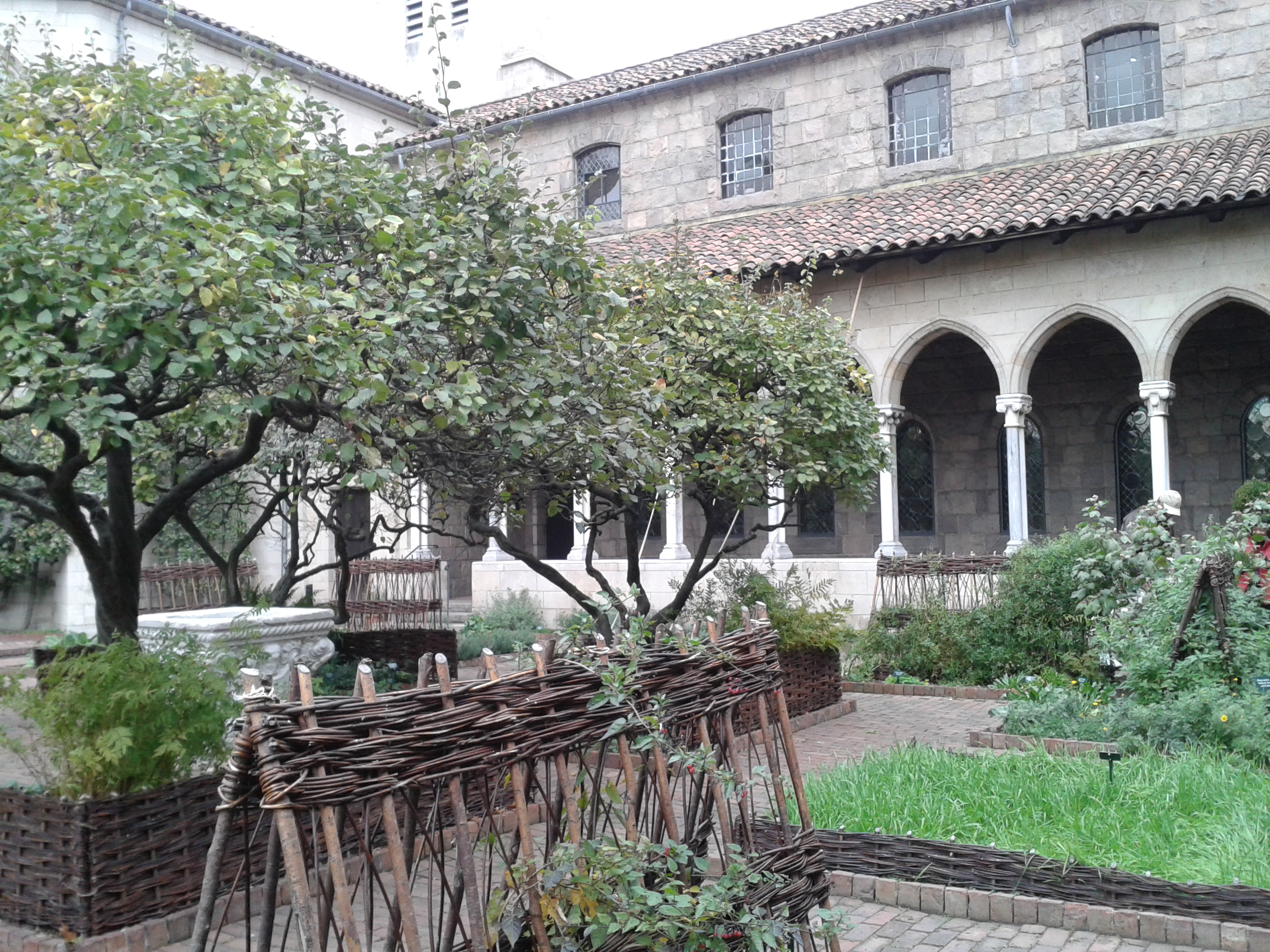
Reconstruction of a medieval herbal garden

Sweet's doctorate study was based on the medical treatise of Hildegard of Bingen, written in Latin, entitled Causae et Curae ("Causes and Cures"). Sweet argues "that Hildegard trained and practiced as an infirmaria, or more specifically as a pigmentarius (meaning pharmacist, spicer, or herbalist), who would have been charged with caring for the medicinal herb garden and curing the sick in the monastic infirmary." Sweet draws special attention to Hildegard's use of the word viriditas. It comes from the Latin word for "green," and was used to refer to the color of plants, as well as meaning "vigor" and "youthfulness." Sweet points out how Hildegard also used the word viriditas in the broader sense of the power of plants to put forth leaves and fruit, and the analogous intrinsic power of human beings to grow and to heal. Inspired by Hildegard, Sweet began to ask herself as she was treating her patients whether anything was interfering with the viriditas or the intrinsic power to heal—to relate to healing like being a gardener who removes impediments and nourishes, in a sanctuary-like setting.

== Views on medicine ==
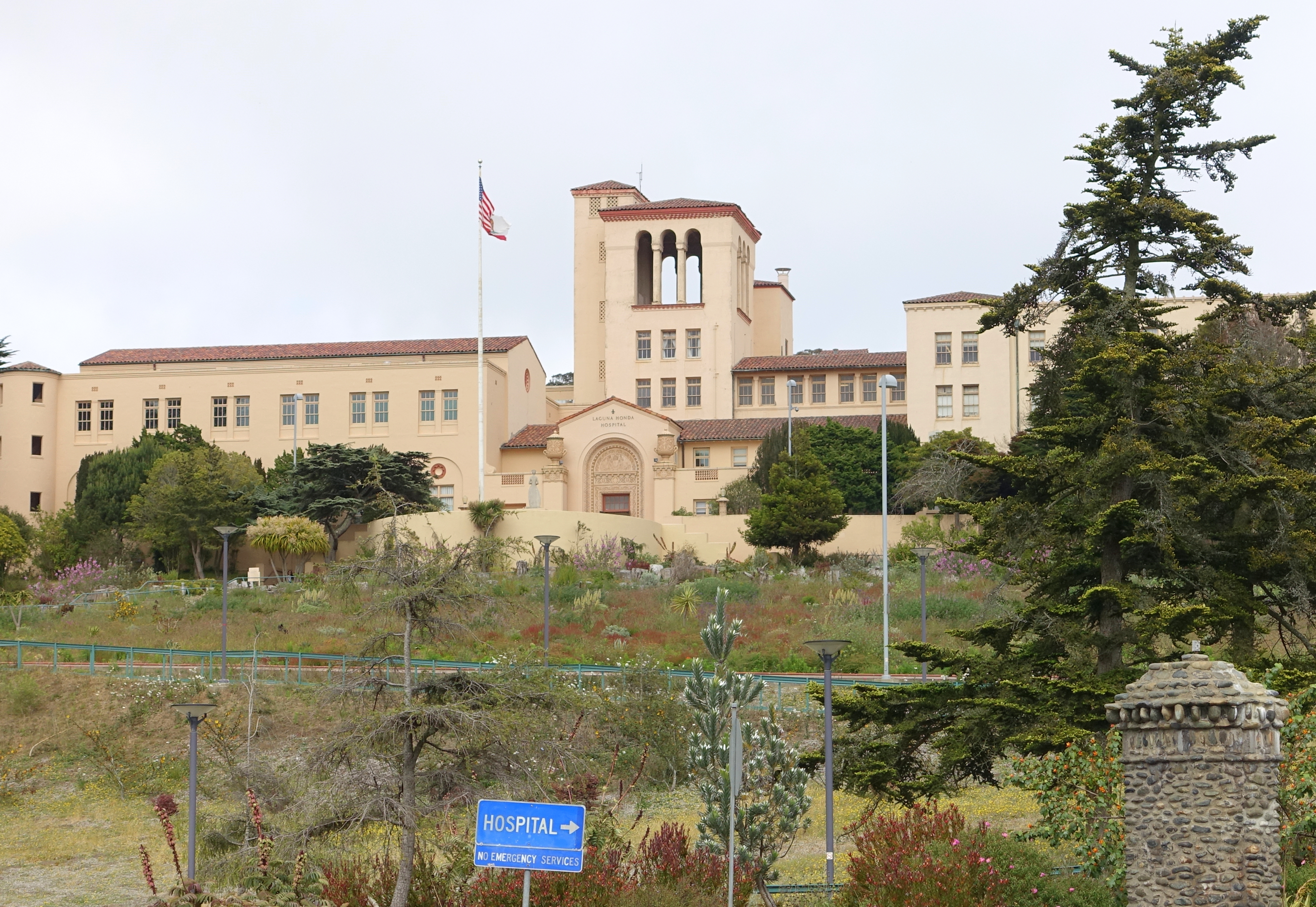
Laguna Honda Hospital, San Francisco, Californnia

During the 1990s and first decade of the 21st century, while obtaining her doctorate in medical history, Sweet was also working as an internal medicine physician at the old Laguna Honda Hospital in San Francisco. In the year 2010 a new hospital facility was built and repurposed. The old Laguna Honda Hospital was a long-term treatment and rehabilitation hospital. She describes the old hospital as being the last "almshouse" in America.

The conjunction of studying the healing philosophy of Hildegard of Bingen along with working at the old Laguna Honda Hospital helped Sweet formulate principles of what she refers to as "slow medicine". Sweet says that "sick people need time...and their doctors do too....Doctors need time to sit with their patients, to think, to read, to consult, to catch their mistakes."

== Pilgrimage ==
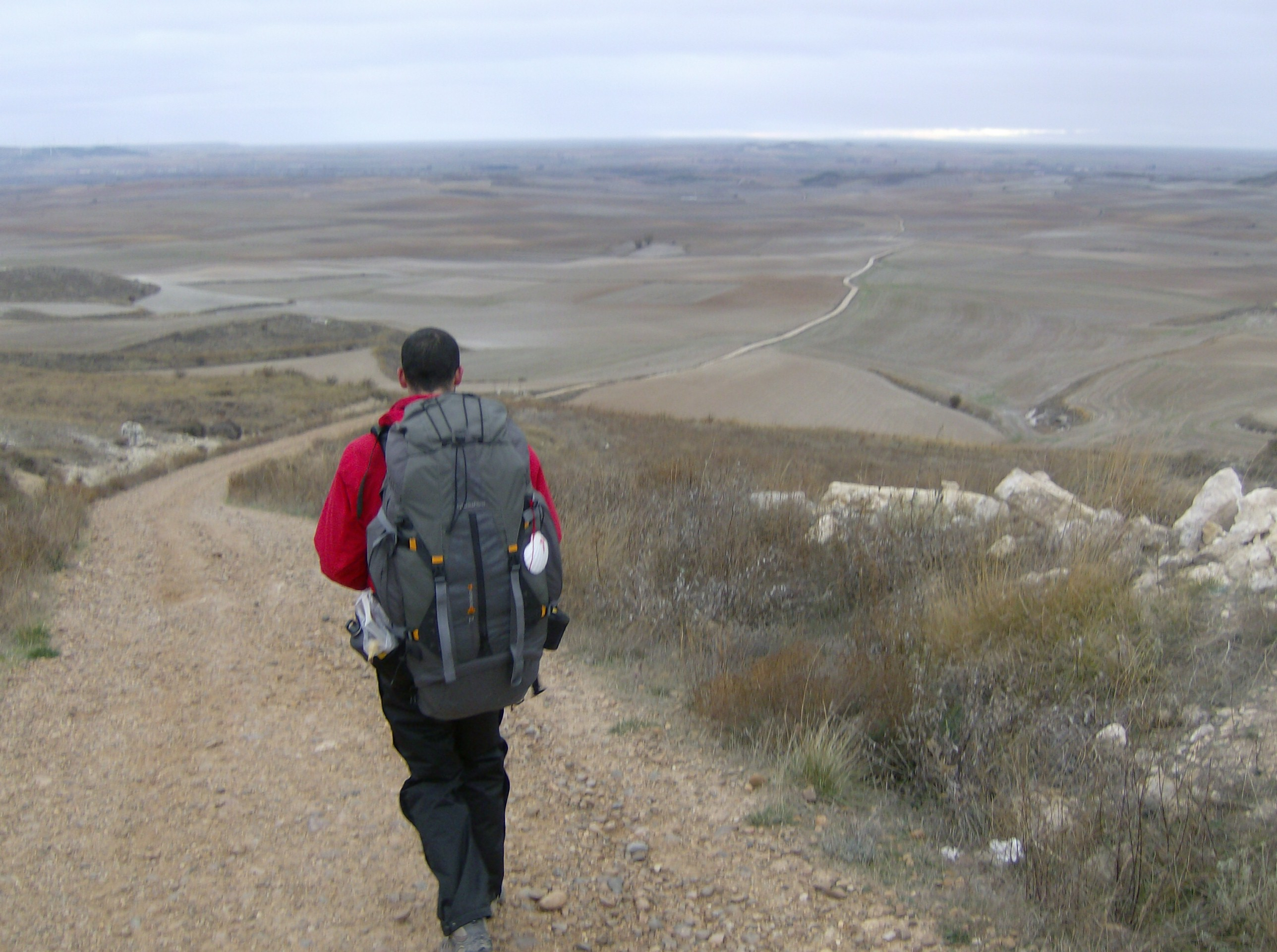
Section of the Camino de Santiago

Over a four-year period, Sweet walked the 1,200 mile (1,900 km) medieval pilgrimage-trail known as the "Way of St. James" (or in Spanish, the "Camino de Santiago"), from southern France to the north-west coast of Spain. For four different years, Sweet would return to walk a 400-mile (600 km) section of the trail, in order to complete the whole trail. While hiking the pilgrimage trail, Sweet experienced a sense of connectedness and fellow-feeling, based on mutual assistance and reciprocal compassion, which she then brought to her evolving practice of medicine.

== Published works ==
- Rooted in the Earth, Rooted in the Sky: Hildegard of Bingen and Premodern Medicine (Studies in Medieval History and Culture) (2006), Routledge.
- God's Hotel: A Doctor, a Hospital, and a Pilgrimage to the Heart of Medicine (2013), Riverhead Books (Penguin).
- Slow Medicine: The Way to Healing (2017), Riverhead Books (Penguin).

== Honors, decorations, awards and distinctions ==
Guggenheim Fellowship for 2014–2015 in the category of Creative Arts, General Non-fiction

== See also ==
- Slow movement (culture)
- Narrative medicine
- Viriditas
