= Pamela Wible =

American physician, author and activist

- Born: Pennsylvania, United States
- Education: Wellesley College (1989); UTMB/Galveston (1993) MD
- Occupations: Family Physician; Doctor Suicide Prevention
- Website: www.idealmedicalcare.org

Pamela Wible is an American physician and activist who promotes community-designed medical clinics; she also maintains a suicide prevention hotline for medical doctors and medical students. Wible is based in Eugene, Oregon.

== Biography ==
=== Early life ===
Pamela Laine Wible was born in 1967 in Philadelphia, Pennsylvania to physician parents: her mother is a psychiatrist and her father was a pathologist. She spent time growing up both in Philadelphia as well as in rural Texas. She would accompany her father in his work in the morgue, and she spent time visiting state mental hospitals with her mother.

=== Education ===
Pamela Wible attended Wellesley College (in Wellesley, Massachusetts) as an undergraduate and then received her MD degree in 1993 from the medical school of the University of Texas Medical Branch (in Galveston, Texas). In 1996 she completed her training in Family Medicine at the University of Arizona Department of Family and Community Medicine.

== Medical career ==
Upon completing her medical training, Wible worked for several years in a variety of medical settings, including hospital-based clinics and community health centers. Wible began to experience suicidal ideation due to depression and pressures related to her job when she became increasingly frustrated with short patient-appointments and other restrictions, and so she stopped her work in the year 2004, and then in 2005 she held a series of "town hall" meetings where she invited community members to write out what they felt would be the features of an "ideal clinic". In the same year Wible opened up a new clinic in the city of Eugene, Oregon which was based on the recommendations from the community. She has also helped do a similar town-hall feedback session with a hospital in Chippewa Valley in 2010.

Wible's clinic includes same-day appointments, appointments that start on time and a smaller practice size. She also emphasizes "patient-focused medicine". The change in her practice helped her enjoy her work as a physician again.

Wible has set up an anonymous suicide prevention hotline to help doctors and medical students who are contemplating suicide. She also collects stories of doctor suicides as a way of raising awareness of the problem. Wible's work on doctor suicide prevention is featured in the documentary film Do No Harm: Exposing the Hippocratic Hoax, by filmmaker Robyn Symon. In 2015, she spoke at TEDMED about the problem of suicide in the medical profession. Wible also has a blog called Ideal Medical Care which shares physician's stories of their treatment while being trained and also stories of suicides by physicians and trainees.

Wible has also been critical of medical animal testing.

In February 2023, three United States senators sent a letter to the Department of Justice which cited a study by Wible in a call to investigate state medical boards which discriminate against physicians on the basis of disabilities, including mental health issues.

== Published works ==
- Pet Goats & Pap Smears: 101 Medical Adventures to Open Your Heart & Mind (2012). ISBN 978-0985710309
- Physician Suicide Letters Answered, (2016). ISBN 978-0985710323
- Human Rights Violations in Medicine: A-to-Z Action Guide, (2019). ISBN 978-0985710330

== See also ==
- Slow medicine
- Doctor's visit
- Bullying in medicine
- Suicide awareness
- Stress in medical students
- Suicide among doctors
