= Viriditas =

Latin word

Viriditas (Latin, literally "greenness," formerly translated as "viridity") is a word meaning vitality, fecundity, lushness, verdure, or growth. It is particularly associated with the abbess and theologian Hildegard von Bingen, who used it to refer to or symbolize spiritual and physical health, often as a reflection of the Divine Word or as an aspect of the divine nature.

== Use by earliest writers ==
"Viriditas" appears several times in Gregory the Great's Moralia in Job to refer to the spiritual health to which Job aspires. Augustine of Hippo uses the term exactly once in City of God to describe mutability. In a collection of over a hundred 12th-century love letters, said to be those between Héloïse and Abelard, the woman uses "viriditas" three times but the man does not use it. Abelard used "viriditas" in at least one sermon, however.

== Use by Hildegard von Bingen ==
Viriditas is one of Hildegard von Bingen's guiding images, used constantly in all of her works. It has been suggested that the lushness of the imagery is possibly due to the lushness of her surroundings at Disibodenberg. Her extensive use of the term can be frustrating in its diversity of uses.

In a study of Hildegard by historian of medicine Dr. Victoria Sweet, who is also a physician, Dr. Sweet pointed out how Hildegard used the word viriditas in the broader sense of the power of plants to put forth leaves and fruit, as well as in the sense of an analogous intrinsic power of human beings to grow and to heal. Inspired by Hildegard, Dr. Sweet began to ask herself as she was treating her own patients whether anything was interfering with the viriditas or the intrinsic power to heal-- to relate to healing like being a gardener who removes impediments and nourishes, in a sanctuary-like setting.

In Scivias, Hildegard focused foremost on viriditas as an attribute of the divine nature. In her works the word viriditas has been translated in various ways, such as freshness, vitality, fertility, fecundity, fruitfulness, verdure, or growth. In Hildegard's understanding, viriditas is a metaphor for spiritual and physical health, which is visible in the divine word. "Homeostasis" could be considered as a more common replacement, but without the theological and spiritual connotations that viriditas has.

== Use by Kim Stanley Robinson ==
The science fiction author Kim Stanley Robinson used it quasi-theologically to mean "the green force of life, expanding into the Universe."

"Look at the pattern this seashell makes. The dappled whorl, curving inward to infinity. That's the shape of the universe itself. There's a constant pressure, pushing toward pattern. A tendency in matter to evolve into ever more complex forms. It's a kind of pattern gravity, a holy greening power we call viriditas, and it is the driving force in the cosmos. Life, you see."
