= Stress in medical students =

Psychological phenomenon

Stress in medical students is stress caused by strenuous medical programs, which may have physical and psychological effects on the well-being of medical students. Excessive stress in medical training predisposes students for difficulties in solving interpersonal conflicts as a result of previous stress. A significant percentage of medical students suffer from anxiety disorders because of the long term effects of stress on emotional and behavioral symptomatology. Dental students also suffer from excessive stress especially during the clinical years. This condition has become a focus of concern nationally and globally, therefore the first line of detection and defense from stress are the students themselves. Students need to be given the tools to recognize and cope with stress, as well as being assured that they will not suffer judgment from others for recognizing their need for help in dealing with stress. The instructors, advisers and other faculty members who notice the signs of stress in a student need to approach the student in a non-threatening, non-judgmental way, in an effort to help medical students recognize and handle their stress.

== Causes ==
Stress is defined as an imbalance between environmental conditions necessary for survival and the ability of individuals to adapt to those conditions. Stress in medical students has been recognized for a long time. Many studies have explored the causes, consequences and solutions. There are three issues considered to be the most relevant, in terms of stress development in medical students. They are required to learn a great deal of new information in a short period of time before taking exams and evaluations. Therefore, they have little to no time to review what they have learned.

Medical students are overloaded with a tremendous amount of information. They have a limited amount of time to memorize all the information studied. The overload of information creates a feeling of disappointment because of the inability to handle all the information at once and succeed during the examination period. Many medical students struggle with their own capacity to meet the demands of medical curriculum.

Stress responses to different situations vary at different levels of consciousness, psychological stress, and physiological stress. These points of stress may be interrelated, and each may be at a different level. Many people believe that the most stressful period of a medical student's academic career is the gap between graduation from medical school and being board eligible in a medical specialty. The Resident Service Committee of the Association of Program Directors in Internal Medicine (APDIM) divided the common stressors of residency into three categories: situational, personal, and professional.

Situational stressors include inordinate hours, sleep deprivation, excessive workload, overbearing clerical and administrative responsibilities, inadequate support from allied health professionals, a large number of difficult patients, and conditions for learning that are less than optimal. Second year students experience other stress situations because they start to interact with the patients. These interactions include stressful situations, like the delivery of bad news.

Personal stressors include family, friend and relationship issues. Financial issues are common, as many residents carry heavy educational debts, and they feel compelled to hold a secondary job in order to repay their debts. Isolation is frequently exacerbated by relocation away from family and friends. Other stressors include limited free time to relax or develop new support systems, psycho-social concerns brought by the stress of residency, and inadequate coping skills. Professional stressors include responsibility for patient care, supervision of more junior residents and students, difficult patients, information overload and career planning.

== Effects ==
Excessive amounts of stress in medical training predisposes students for difficulties in solving interpersonal conflicts, sleeping disorders, decreased attention, reduced concentration, temptation to cheat on exams, depression, loss of objectivity, increased incidence of errors, and improper behavior such as negligence. Furthermore, stress in medical students can break the stability of the student's health and result in illness. This can cause headaches, gastrointestinal disorders, coronary heart disease, impaired judgments, absenteeism, self-medication, and the consumption of drugs and alcohol. It is notable that these risks continue throughout training, also affecting resident and attending physicians in addition to medical students, particularly with regard to depressive symptoms.

A recent study among German medical students at international universities displayed the significantly higher risk of depression symptoms being 2.4 times higher than the average population. 23.5% of these German medical students showed clinically relevant depressive symptoms. A meta-analysis in the American journal JAMA suggested depressive symptoms in 21% to 43% of all medical students.

The students make an effort to counteract the impact of stressful situations with various coping skills. The coping includes both cognitive and behavioral efforts against the problem of stress encountered during examinations. Medical students who fail to manage their stress levels have a tendency to be less competent in their work. Students who do not manage the time limits of examinations well lack time for exercise and social interactions because those two points are more stressful than the perceived discrimination on the course or the death of patients.

Medical Students would often cram before exams only to forget most of it after exams or entirely skipping organ systems as complete knowledge is not necessary for passing exams.

== Physical effects ==
Stress levels have a strong relationship with physical condition. Medical students during an examination period can experience insomnia, fatigue, and nausea. Moreover, metabolism is disturbed by diarrhea or constipation. Skin diseases, including acne, dermatitis, and psoriasis, are common during the examination period. These symptoms are provoked by long working hours and the tension of completing the courses with good grades.

Medical students have been known to consume caffeinated beverages to be active and alert during time of studying. These students drink large quantities of coffee, tea, cola, and energy drinks. Though an increased intake of caffeine can increase the levels of adenosine, adrenaline, cortisol and dopamine in the blood, caffeine also inhibits the absorption of some nutrients, increasing the acidity of the gastrointestinal tract and depleting the levels of calcium, magnesium, iron and other trace minerals of the body through urinary excretion. Furthermore, caffeine decreases blood flow to the brain by as much as 30 percent, and it decreases the stimulation of insulin, a hormone that helps regulate the body's blood sugar level.

Stress can cause high levels of the following hormones: norepinephrine, leptin, NPY, nitrite, ACTH and adrenomedullin. Elevated levels of adenosine, adrenaline, cortisol and dopamine in the blood can produce fatigue, depression, behavior changes, heart disease, weight problems, diabetes, and skin diseases. It also decreases the immune response, which can lead to heartburn and stomach ulcers.

The hormones of the menstrual cycle (follicle-stimulating hormone (FSH) and luteinizing hormone (LH)) during the examination periods are also affected. Female students may be disturbed during menstrual cycles because the FSH and LH normal levels changes radically. Medical students may also have disturbed sleep cycles in these periods.

== Psychological effects ==
An optimal level of stress is considered good because medical students develop coping abilities. However, too much stress causes problems. Previous studies have reported that a significant percentage of medical students suffer anxiety disorders because stress has a strong relationship to emotional and behavioral problems. Feelings of disappointment academically are most prevalent in those students who have poor academic performance.

The major emotional disorders that have been observed include the inability to feel reasonably happy, loss of sleep, over-worry, constantly feeling under strain, feeling unhappy and depressed, inability to concentrate, inability to enjoy normal activities, losing confidence in one’s self, inability to overcome difficulties, inability to face up to problems, inability to make decisions, inability to play a useful part in things, and believing oneself to be worthless. Given these emotional disorders, studies have also proved that medical students are more likely to have suicidal thoughts than students from other schools.

Female medical students may respond to the stress with stronger manifestations of anxiety. Physiological, psychological and behavioral stressors are found to be related to the metabolic changes of the body.

Stress may also harm professional effectiveness. It decreases attention, reduces concentration, impinges on decision-making skills, and reduces the ability to establish strong physician–patient relationships. Medical students have also noticed changes in their behavior when they are stressed. Irritability and depression are common in students in later semesters, and these mental disturbances increase when examinations start.

== Treatment ==
As too much stress causes problems, it is important to evaluate the degree of stress a student may have. Today, there are methods to assess the level of emotional stress that medical students can handle. It is advisable to manage study time and include healthy nutrition during the whole day. In addition, daily exercises can help to reduce the stress. Interventions against academic dishonesty such as plagiarism also helps to prevent the risk of stress and depression in medical students. Studying in a small group also allows students to learn from each other and reduce the stress of learning by sharing ideas. Furthermore, some medical schools provide psychologists to help students manage stress.

Communication among third and fourth year medical students prepares them for the stressors of real-life clinical practice. This mental preparation stimulates the students to reduce the percentages of error in a medical consultation. Medical students are prepared to diagnose and treat patients, but may not be adequately prepared to interact with the problems of their patient, or to deal with bad news as well as the patient's emotional stress during consultations.

Emotional intelligence (EI) can be a protection against the effects of psychological stress, and it may enhance well-being. However, EI is molded through personality and has not been observed to be affected by stressful situations. However, those students who participate in extracurricular activities have lower states of anxiety than those who are concentrated only on their studies. To address these problems, some medical schools have made changes such as reducing the workweek, instituting curricular reforms such as having shorter classes, less rote memorization, and providing psychological services.

Stress in medical students has become a focus of concern globally, with the first line of detection and defense of the stress being the students themselves. Some interventions include compulsory attendance in support groups, so the level of stigma is much lower than that associated with attending individual therapy. This provides long-term continuous support and help for students to monitor the progress and preparation for a better practice.

Other stress-management programs provide trainees with coping techniques such as hypnosis, imagery, and muscle relaxation; affiliation with peers, opportunities for emotional expression and intensified relationships with the faculty.

The interventions of the majority of the programs use a group structure where the trainees meet with their peers, or with leaders. No "gold standard" exists for the content of stress-reduction programs for medical trainees. Some propose a scheme of directed and non-directed support groups, relaxation training (including meditation and hypnosis), time-management and coping skills, mindfulness-based stress reduction, and mentoring programs. Good intervention includes relaxation basics like abdominal breathing, learning to identify and counter negative thoughts, use of the imagery in relaxation, practical ways to increase healthy eating, building positive coping, applying relaxing or activating words appropriately, and redirecting time and energy to different tasks based on the level of importance.

== See also ==
- Pamela Wible
