= Narrative medicine =

Medical approach

Narrative medicine is the discipline of applying the skills used in analyzing literature to interviewing patients. The premise of narrative medicine is that how a patient speaks about his or her illness or complaint is analogous to how literature offers a plot (an interconnected series of events) with characters (the patient and others) and is filled with metaphors (picturesque, emotional, and symbolic ways of speaking), and that becoming conversant with the elements of literature facilitates understanding the stories that patients bring. Narrative Medicine is a diagnostic and comprehensive approach that utilizes patients' narratives in clinical practice, research, and education to promote healing. Beyond attempts to reach accurate diagnoses, it aims to address the relational and psychological dimensions that occur in tandem with physical illness. Narrative medicine aims not only to validate the experience of the patient, it also encourages creativity and self-reflection in the physician.

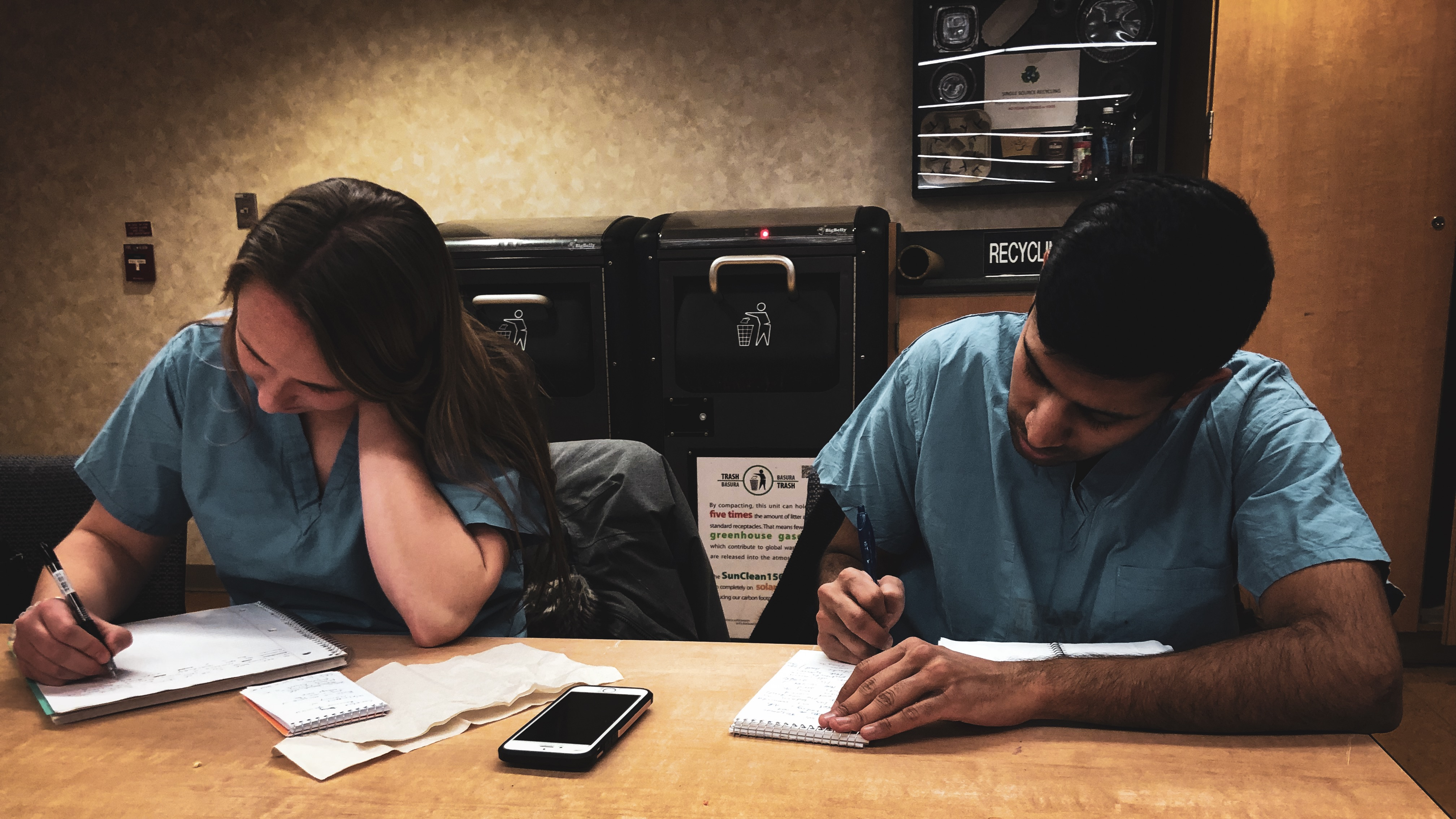
Two first year medical students at Lewis Katz School of Medicine writing/journaling about their experiences in the hospital.

== History and development ==
In 1910, the Carnegie Foundation for the Advancement of Teaching created the Flexner Report, which set out to redefine medical educational practices. The report argues that the goal of medicine is "an attempt to fight the battle against disease most advantageously to the patient." Flexner wrote that "the practitioner deals with facts of two categories. Chemistry, physics, biology enable him to apprehend one set; he needs a different apperceptive and appreciative apparatus to deal with other more subtle elements. Specific preparation is in this direction much more difficult; one must rely for the requisite insight and sympathy on a varied and enlarging cultural experience." In the late 20th century, narrative medicine came to emphasize an aspect of wider cultural elements in medicine.

From the 1990s, physicians such as Rachel Naomi Remen and Rita Charon, who also holds a doctorate in English literature, argued that medical practice should be structured around the narratives of patients. In 2000, Rita Charon first used the term 'Narrative Medicine' to describe a method of using what she calls "narrative competence," which is "the capacity to recognize, absorb, metabolize, interpret, and be moved by stories of illness."

== Methodology ==
The teaching of narrative medicine involves close reading of texts, writing assignments of personal reflection about the text, and discussion of the personal reflections. With the development of 'narrative competence' comes greater understanding and empathy that facilitate the patient and clinician working together.

Close reading

Close reading is a technique in teaching literature wherein the formal aspects of a text are studied. Students are directed to the read a text "for its information, ambiguity, complexity, texture, and mood as well as for its plot." These methods can be adapted to film, art, and music in the form of 'slow looking' and 'close listening.'

Creative Writing

Following a close reading of a text, students write about their personal encounter with the text, which "unleashes the curiosity and imagination of the writer."

Discussion

In turn, Narrative Medicine teachers apply "close reading" to the students' reflective writing.

== Allied use of narrative ==
The term 'Narrative Medicine' refers to training in interpreting literature and applying that skill to understanding the accounts of patients. Associated fields also use 'Narrative-based Medicine', a main proponent of which is the English General Practice physician John Launer, who holds a degree in English literature. His approach comes from an orientation of Family therapy, wherein patients are invited to expand on and explore new directions in the accounts of their illnesses.

=== Narrative in Medicine ===
A broader field is the use of narrative in general in helping doctors and patients deepen understanding of the ways of relating to illness and healing. In the 1990s and early 21st century, this approach is exemplified by the American physician Lewis Mehl-Madrona and the British physician Trisha Greenhalgh.

== Educational programs ==
A number of schools in the United States offer advanced classes in narrative medicine.

- Columbia University has developed educational programs in the field of narrative medicine.
  - Interprofessional Education: The Division of Narrative Medicine at Columbia University Irving Medical Center collaborates with all clinical programs at the medical center, in addition to leading the Interprofessional Education programming.
  - Rounds and Workshops: The division hosts events and trainings, including "monthly rounds and weekend intensive workshops" for the public.
  - Master of Science: Columbia University created the "Master of Science in Narrative Medicine" program in 2009, making it the first graduate program devoted to narrative medicine.
  - Textbook: In 2016, the first textbook in narrative medicine was published: "The Principles and Practice of Narrative Medicine."
  - Certification Program: In 2017, an asynchronous online "Certification program in Narrative Medicine" began.
- In 2016, the Lewis Katz School of Medicine launched a Narrative Medicine Program run by Mike Vitez, a Pulitzer Prize-winning journalist, and Naomi Rosenberg, an Emergency Medicine physician. The program's goal is to protect, support, and nourish the humanism that brings physicians into the profession, and to teach the skills of narrative that help at the bedside and beyond. The program has curricular and extracurricular components. Reflective writing forms a significant component of the Professional Identity Formation thread in the MD curriculum. Electives in medical humanities range from exploration of narrative medicine to photo storytelling to improvisational acting. Students also conceive and complete individual or group projects for elective credit under the guidance of the faculty. Extracurricular activities include a wide array of writing and narrative medicine workshops—some led by students—for students, residents, and hospital staff. "Narrative Medicine Talks" is a regular speaker series, and the program hosts fall and spring Story Slams for the Lewis Katz School of Medicine and Temple Hospital Community. On December 7, 2019, LKSOM hosted its inaugural Narrative Medicine Conference.
- Montefiore Medical Center created a program in Narrative Medicine within its Department of Family and Social Medicine. Residents learn how to use personal narrative to enhance empathy, as well addressing stress, loss, and balance.
- The Ohio State University Humanities Institute supports the multidisciplinary initiative of narrative medicine. The program runs concurrently with their other undergraduate and graduate programs, where students "strive to develop narrative competence that enables them to deliver care that is not only more empathetic and compassionate, but also more effective."
- In 2020, the University of Southern California Keck School of Medicine began a Master of Science program in Narrative Medicine.
- In 2011, Western University created the Narrative Medicine Initiative (NMI) and has incorporated narrative medicine into its undergraduate, postgraduate, and continuing medical education departments. They work to answer questions such as "How does the art of storytelling improve health care education and the experience of patient care?" Western holds regular (at least annual) narrative medicine rounds during which local patients and physicians share their stories of disease and illness, with a focus on how the stories will improve physician's ability to handle future stories.
- Lenoir-Rhyne University has established the Thomas Wolfe Center for Narrative, with the slogan "Heeding the call for narrative in a fragmented world." The program offers graduate-level and certification courses in several narrative training disciplines, one of which is narrative medicine.
- Saybrook University takes a broad approach to narrative medicine through its mind-body medicine program, which follows the mind-body approach to health and wellness as a way to improve quality of life for patients.
- Misericordia University requires a course in narrative medicine for all students in its Medical and Health Humanities major.

The growing field of narrative medicine extends beyond the United States:

- The British Medical Journal began writing seminars to promote this type of narrative among emerging physicians.
- At University of Southern Denmark narrative medicine is a required course for all undergraduate medical students.
- In Italy, the Healthcare Area of ISTUD (Institute of Management Studies) offers a Master in Applied Narrative Medicine that is designed for health care professionals

== See also ==
- Medical humanities
- Graphic medicine
- Narrative criticism
- Storytelling
- Narration
- Slow medicine
- Health humanities
- Writing Therapy
- Reflective writing
