= Cinemeducation =

Use of film in medical education

Cinemeducation is the use of film in medical education. It was originally coined by Matthew Alexander, Hall, and Pettice in the journal Family Medicine in 1994 and later used by Matthew Alexander, Anna Pavlov, and Patricia Lenahan in their text of the same title. Cinemeducation is generally regarded as a pedagogical approach situated within the field of medical humanities. Cinemeducation emphasises the biopsychosocial aspects of medicine. It has been used in teaching family systems theory, end-of-life care, medical professionalism and medical ethics, public health, and in psychiatry and mental health services. Cinemeducation is offering space for reflective thinking, stimulating perspective-taking, and connecting knowledge with emotional narratives. Participating in a cinemeducation course can lead to changes in attitudes, knowledge enrichment, an empathic understanding of health-related topics, and an open-mindedness about working in an interprofessional team. Participants attending a cinemeducation course appear to demonstrate enhanced long-term retention of health-related topics, with improved recall persisting into later stages of life.

== See also ==
- Film studies, an academic discipline dealing with theoretical, historical, and critical approaches to films
- Medical humanities, an interdisciplinary field of medicine which includes the humanities, social sciences and arts
