= Paul Crawford (academic) =

English academic and writer

Paul Crawford FRSA FAcSS FRSPH
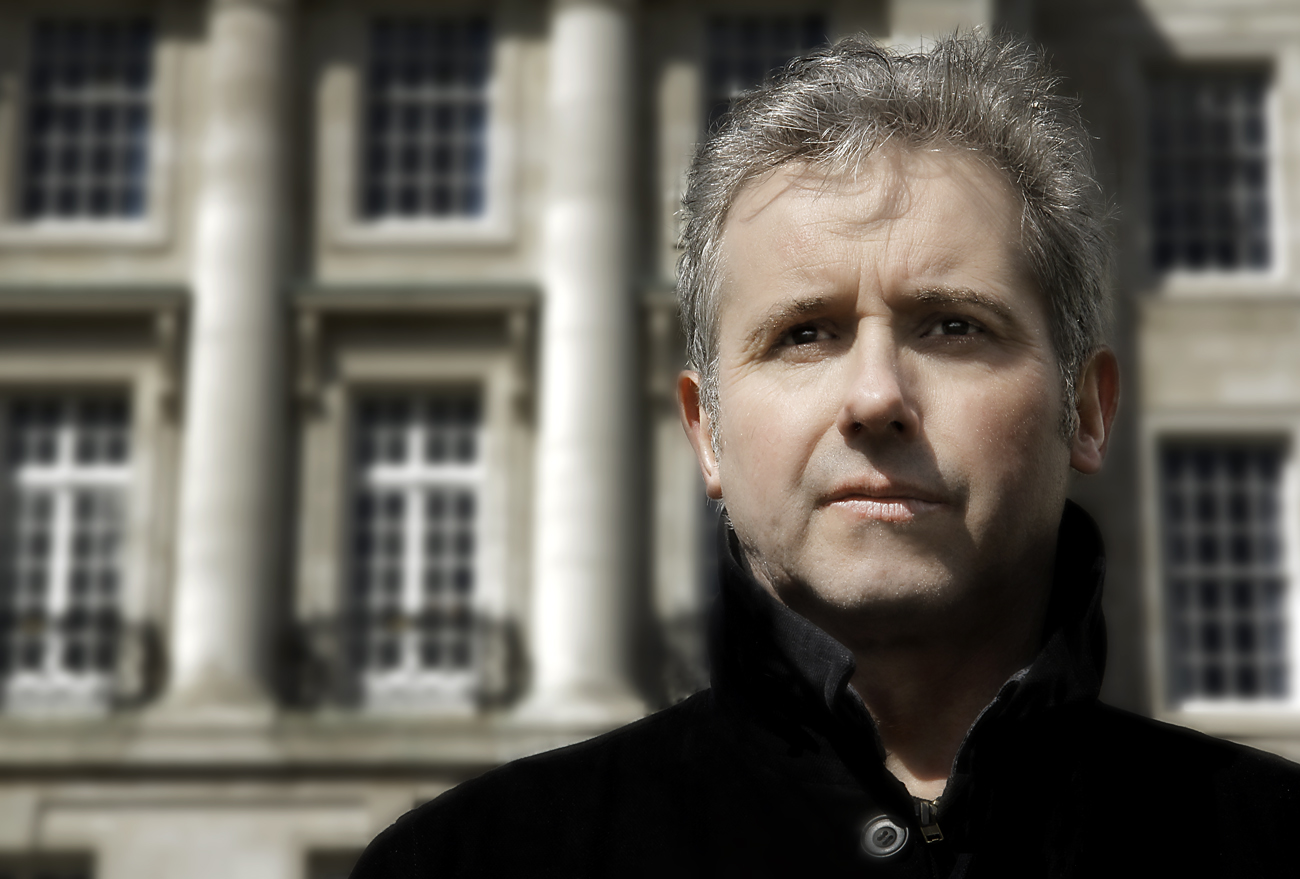
- Born: 24 April 1963 (age 63); Birmingham, United Kingdom

Academic background
- Education: University of Birmingham

Academic work
- Discipline: Health Humanities
- Institutions: University of Nottingham

Paul Crawford (born 1963) is a British academic and writer. He is known for pioneering the field of Health Humanities.

== Academic career ==
Crawford received a Bachelor of Arts in English language and literature from the University of Birmingham in 1994, followed by a PhD in 1999. His thesis on the novelist William Golding was funded by the British Academy.

In 2001, Crawford joined the University of Nottingham, where he founded the Health Language Research Group. In 2008, he became the first Professor of Health Humanities globally. Currently, he serves as Director of the Centre for Social Futures at the Institute of Mental Health.

Crawford has secured over £6 million in research grants from organizations such as the Arts and Humanities Research Council, Economic and Social Research Council, and The Leverhulme Trust. In 2021, he led the "What’s Up With Everyone" campaign with Aardman Animations, which aimed to support young people’s mental health. The campaign won "Best Social Media and Content" at the 2021 Design Week Awards.

== Writings ==
Crawford has authored or co-authored fifteen books, comprising two works of fiction and a wide range of non-fiction books on health communication, mental health, and literary analysis.

=== Fiction ===
- Nothing Purple, Nothing Black (2002) — A compelling debut novel where the lives of a fugitive Roman Catholic bishop and an ex-mental patient intertwine, leading to a tragic climax. It explores themes of morality, faith, and the human condition.
- The Wonders of Doctor Bent (2025) — A psychological thriller exploring trauma, revenge, and redemption through the dark and complex journey of two unlikely companions.

=== Non-fiction ===
- Communicating Care: The Language of Nursing (1998) — The first volume worldwide on non-medical discourse in healthcare.
- Politics and History in William Golding (2003) — A critical work reviewed in The Times Literary Supplement.
- Evidence Based Research: Dilemmas and Debates in Healthcare (2003) — Highly Commended in the British Medical Association Book Competition.
- Storytelling in Therapy (2004) — Explores the use of short stories in Cognitive Behavioural Therapy.
- Communication in Clinical Settings (2006) — Introduces the "Brief, Ordinary and Effective Model" for health communication.
- Evidence-based Health Communication (2006) — Advocates for data-driven learning in health communication.
- Madness in Post-1945 British and American Fiction (2010) — Analyzes representations of madness in literature.
- Health Humanities (2015) — Expands on Crawford's seminal paper defining the field.
- Humiliation: Mental Health and Public Shame (2019) — Examines the link between humiliation and aggression.
- The Routledge Companion to Health Humanities (2020) — A comprehensive volume featuring 65 chapters from global scholars.
- Florence Nightingale at Home (2020) — Explores domestic influences on Nightingale's ideas.
- Cabin Fever: Surviving Lockdown in the Coronavirus Pandemic (2021) — A cultural history of isolation.
- Mental Health Literacy and Young People (2022) — A guide for young people’s mental health literacy.

== Radio Appearances ==
Crawford has been featured on major radio programs such as BBC Radio 4's Today programme and Woman's Hour, discussing topics like mental health, religion, and creative writing.
