= Suicide among doctors =

Suicide among doctors refers to medical doctors or trainees who die by suicide. Studies report that medical doctors are more likely to die by suicide than the general population and those with similar academic training who are not in the medical field.

The suicide mortality rate is about the same among male and female doctors, and significantly higher than the general population. Female physicians are at higher risk of attempting suicide than men, showing rates over 250% higher among women and about 70% higher among men versus the general population. In the United States of America, an estimated 300 to 400 doctors die by suicide each year, a rate of 28 to 40 per 100,000, or more than double that of general population. 9% of American male physicians and 11% of American female physicians reported having suicidal thoughts in Medscape's Physician Suicide Report 2023.

== Medical trainees ==
A 1999 paper reported that even though there is agreement that being a physician increases a person's risk of suicide, there is little research on the risk of suicide among medical students. A study of medical residents in the United States from 2000 to 2014 found that suicide was one of the leading causes of death in that population.

=== Institutions ===
In 2018, a journalist for Refinery29 reviewed how Mount Sinai Hospital in Manhattan responds to suicide by its physicians.

== Response ==
Historically, physicians who sought help for suicidal ideation sometimes faced professional punishments including risk of having their medical license revoked, future barriers to career advancement, and restrictions on professional privileges. However, many non-profit organizations and healthcare systems have begun developing tools and resources for physicians and other healthcare professionals to seek help and support as well as to address systemic barriers to treatment. Some professional organizations recommend that health organizations reform policy to allow physicians who want counseling to be able to access it with fewer professional penalties.

== In the media ==
Do No Harm is a documentary film about physician suicide released in 2018.

During the COVID-19 outbreak in New York City in 2020, doctor's deaths by suicide gained media attention. The story of Dr. Lorna Breen, an ER doctor at New York Presbyterian-Allen Hospital in Northern Manhattan, helped to gain awareness about this issue of mental health struggles, burnout, and suicide risk amongst doctors working through the crisis.

In 2022, Austrian doctor Lisa-Maria Kellermayr committed suicide after a tweet she made criticizing opponents to coronavirus vaccination and safety protocols made her a target for cyberbullying and abuse.

== See also ==
- Physician burnout
