= Physician burnout =

Psychological syndrome

Physician burnout has been classified as a psychological syndrome that can be expressed as a prolonged response to due chronic occupational stressors. Burnout is known to affect a wide variety health care professionals, from medical students to practicing physicians, with effects on both their individual well-being and the broader healthcare industry. Various treatment and prevention strategies have been developed at individual, team, and organizational levels, though prevalence remains high.

== Characteristics ==
=== Prevalence ===
Research suggests that occupational burnout among physicians exceeds 50% in the USA. This refers to not only physicians currently practicing medicine, but also those in training. Signs of burnout have even been traced back to medical students who have experienced disconnect between taught professional behaviors and those witnessed in practice.

"Our data show wide variability in the prevalence of burnout by clinical specialty, and that anxiety, social support and empathy during medical school relate to the risk of burnout during residency," says Liselotte Dyrbye, M.D., a Mayo Clinic researcher and first author of the article "Association of Clinical Specialty With Symptoms of Burnout and Career Choice Regret Among US Resident Physicians"

In an argument explained in Economic and Political Weekly, Edmond Fernandes, lead author stated that being motivated by the best intentions is not enough; they need to be given adequate rest. The time to regulate work hours is long overdue. With growing population in a country like India, the number of doctors remains grossly insufficient to strike this balance which leads to physician and resident fatigue ending up in medical errors and complications.

=== Signs ===
Burnout has been referred to as a compilation of cynicism, depersonalization, and a low sense of accomplishment. Other symptoms included feelings of emotional exhaustion, inadequacy, and detachment. This is thought to be due to imbalances whether that be in regards to workload, personal values, incentive, justice, and a sense of community. Factors such as time pressure, chaotic work environments and a lack of alignment between physicians and executives have been known to exacerbate this burden. These elements can cause clinicians to become frustrated and overwhelmed. Moreover, the correlation between lack of control and burnout has been explored and shows that an increased sense of lack of control has been linked to a greater risk of being affected by burnout.

One study, claimed that "We found that physicians with burnout had more than twice the odds of self-reported medical error, after adjusting for specialty, work hours, fatigue and work unit safety rating(...)"

=== Causes ===
The healthcare landscape continues to evolve, and recent changes are characterized by an aging population, physician shortages and the monetization of health care services, and an increasing reliance on large-scale data and digital technology to make healthcare decisions. These demands, as well as demands from regulators and payers for more accountability, increased healthcare quality, and reduced cost, are thought to increase physician burnout.

==== Role of technology ====
Recent shifts from analog-legacy systems to digital systems (dubbed the 4th industrial revolution) have enabled an unprecedented volume and velocity of data exchange, which has impacted healthcare and all other sectors. This drive from legacy systems to digital systems demands that physicians adapt to changes quickly, which can be stressful and increase burnout.

Specifically, the implementation of the electronic health records (EHR) is associated with physician burnout. The reasons include lack of EHR usability, demand for standardized documentation as against free flowing narrative texts, and redundant documentation. Excessive data entry requirements, lack of interoperability, and notes geared toward billing tend to be the highest factors contributing to EHR-induced physician burnout. Research indicates that the use of EHRs has increased the amount of time spent on documentation for patients by their respective doctors by 11%-22%.

==== Administrative workload ====
One major contributor to physician burnout is the excessive administrative workload. Physicians are required to dedicate a significant portion of their time to non-clinical tasks, reducing the time they can spend with patients. On average, U.S. physicians spend 2.6 hours per week meeting external quality measures—time that could instead be used to see nine additional patients. Additionally, for every hour spent face-to-face with patients, physicians spend two more hours on clerical tasks such as documentation, billing, and compliance reporting. This administrative burden is a key stressor in the medical field, leading to emotional exhaustion and reduced job satisfaction. A study of 200 medical and auxiliary staff found a significant positive correlation (r = .495) between burnout and administrative workload, highlighting how these tasks contribute directly to physician stress and dissatisfaction.

==== Work schedules ====
Another major factor contributing to burnout is the long and demanding work hours that many physicians endure. The average physician in the U.S. works 51 hours per week, and about one in four works more than 60 hours weekly. These intense schedules often come with limited opportunities for rest, frequent on-call shifts, and the expectation to work weekends, personal time, and even during vacations. Such prolonged work hours make it difficult for physicians to maintain a healthy work-life balance, leading to higher stress levels and increased exhaustion.

=== Models ===
Likewise, burnout has been analyzed using differing conceptual models. One strategy examined burnout as a product of three stages. Stage one consists of exhaustion at work that progresses into detachment and negative feelings at work that later starts to affect patients and coworkers in stage two. Lastly, stage three is composed of feelings of inadequacy and failure. However, a more recent approach sought to choose three stages that served as a bridge between said stages and imbalances. The first groups together all job stressors such as imbalances caused by work demands while the second solely addressed individual strain in the form of anxiety and exhaustion. Lastly, the third described changes in mood and behavior as defensive coping that could be closely linked to cynicism.

== Impacted populations ==
=== Physicians ===
The progression of physician burnout takes a toll on the individual whether it be a medical student or practicing clinician mainly through adverse psychological affects that have lasting consequences. A concept known as asymmetrical rewards speaks of how physicians are rarely recognized for what they do well, yet there is much attention surrounding medical malpractice suits ready to capitalize on a physician's errors. In addition, clinicians become desensitized to patients and medicine resulting a perspective shift towards viewing patient care as a chore more than a desire to heal. However, the effects of burnout extend past the physicians themselves to ultimately affect anyone in contact with them.

=== Residents ===
Burnout in physicians appears to be the highest for resident physicians. Due to the large number of hours taken on by resident physicians, they are often more prone to burnout. In addition to the long hours, residents are still in the process of learning clinical knowledge. Stressful events, such as death of a patient, managing a critically ill patient, medical error, and verbal abuse from patients, their families and/or colleagues have been reported in a study done at medical schools in the Philadelphia area. In this study, researchers found that 70% of residents experienced at least one work-related stress event and that nearly 5% showed symptoms of PTSD from a stressful event at work. Similar to the work-life balance struggle physicians face, residents may struggle to manage everything going on in their lives. Negative effects of this burnout include decreased job satisfaction, being absent while at work and possibility for medical errors. Some studies have even shown reduced feelings of personal accomplishment and emotional exhaustion. Residents who considered themselves to be experiencing burnout report more medical errors than residents who do not. In a 24 month-long study performed at Mayo Clinic in 2016, found that burnout and low job satisfaction were associated with reductions in professional work effort. In 2008, the Healthcare Management Review suggested that healthcare settings that put programs in place to reduce physician burnout would see greater patient satisfaction and recovery. Resident interventions aimed to improve communication and role conflict have been shown to improve self-acceptance, acceptance of aggression and inner directedness in residents, interns, and nurses. Although burnout in resident physicians has become common knowledge in the medical community, few systems are in place to combat this issue. Some possible solutions are support groups, stress-management/coping training and self-care education.

=== Medical students ===
An estimated 43-45% of medical students report feelings of burnout. It has been proposed that physician burnout originates from physicians years' in medical school. In 2010, a study was done by Emory School of Medicine and Vanderbilt School of Medicine to understand the prevalence and factors of burnout in medical students. Here, burnout was defined as emotional exhaustion, depersonalization and decreased physical exhaustion. The study administered the Maslach Burnout Inventory Human Services Survey to 249 medical students. This survey asked questions about stress levels, workload, relaxation habits, support systems and demographics. The study found that 21% of first-year students, 41% of second-year students, 43% of third-year, and 31% of fourth-year students felt symptoms of burnout. Factors associated with a higher rate of burnout include lower support, higher stress, and feelings of lack of control over one's life. There is no single solution to this issue, but easing student and physician workload and promoting wellness and resilience in the medical field has been shown to help. Specifically in medical students, mindfulness-based meditation sessions have been shown to improve mood disturbance.

=== Colleagues ===
Friends and family often feel the burden when interacting with burned-out clinicians since most of these individuals will be disengaged and can exhibit symptoms of major depressive disorder. Coworkers are also likely to be impacted. For example, burnout initiated by a chaotic, unsupportive work environment results in higher rates of miscommunication and unresolved conflicts. It has also been shown that a workforce afflicted by burnout contributes to an overall greater hostile atmosphere.

=== Health industry ===
Other impacted populations include the patients and healthcare industry seeing as burnout results in decreased quality of care. Research has generated evidence supporting an inverse correlation between burnout and productivity. Thus the shift in decreased productivity sometimes ends in decreased physician retention due to low job satisfaction and decreased mental health. Since successful medical interactions are based on trust between providers and patients, this constant staff turnover can go on to reflect poorly upon the institution.

== Impact on patients ==
=== Quality of care ===
Physician burnout significantly contributes to decreased quality of care, primarily due to its impact on clinical decision-making, which can lead to increased medical errors. Burnout leads to mental and physical exhaustion, which in turn impairs cognitive function. Physicians suffering from burnout are less able to critically analyze clinical information, making them more likely to overlook important details or make poor decisions under pressure. When physicians are tired and disengaged, they may not engage deeply with patient histories or may be less likely to question diagnostic hypotheses, which contributes to errors. Burnout affects a physician's ability to communicate effectively with colleagues and patients. Poor communication leads to errors in the exchange of critical patient information, which can exacerbate diagnostic mistakes, incorrect treatments, or delayed interventions. When physicians are exhausted and emotionally drained, they may not engage in collaborative decision-making, and may make errors in interpreting or sharing patient data.

Physician burnout can lead to reduced patient satisfaction as exhausted and emotionally drained doctors may become detached or less empathetic in their interactions. Physician burnout is associated with patients feeling less satisfied with their medical care.

=== Healthcare costs ===
Physician burnout significantly increases healthcare costs by driving inefficiencies in patient care and contributing to medical errors, malpractice claims, and prolonged hospital stays. Burned-out clinicians are more prone to making mistakes, leading to costly complications, additional treatments, and readmissions. Studies have shown that hospitals with high levels of burnout experience greater rates of diagnostic errors, unnecessary testing, and procedural mistakes, all of which inflate healthcare expenditures. Additionally, burnout-related malpractice claims place a financial burden on healthcare systems through legal fees and settlements. Increased staff turnover due to burnout further exacerbates costs, as recruiting and training new healthcare professionals require substantial investment.

== Treatment & prevention ==
=== Individual approaches ===
Treatment strategies first focused on addressing the individual. Physician-oriented approaches ranged from cognitive behavioral techniques (CBT) such as meditation and coping strategies to professional coaching, which aimed at reinforcing individual resilience. Because of the high incidence of physician burnout, the field of physician coaching has emerged. Physician coaching involves the implementation of mentors, usually former physicians, that would guide physicians out of burnout. Gazelle, Liebschutz, and Riess discussed the benefits of physician coaching as being able to cater to each provider using his or her own previous experiences therefore personalizing the intervention as opposed to CBT which delivers treatment in a standardized manner. On the other hand, Dr. Kelly speaks of how altering perception of patients from chores and potential litigation sources to opportunities to heal is key to the reversal of burnout.

=== Organizational approach ===
Some research suggests that a combination of individual, team, and organizationl approaches is the most appropriate way to fully address burnout. The entire health care system requires transformational change and organizational approaches have shown much promise as successful treatment options by reducing workloads and distributing more flexible schedules among employees. A shift to realign goals between physicians and executive administrators could also contribute to reducing the risk of burnout. A systematic review analyzing individual and organizational strategies found that organization-oriented approaches were more effective. Other examples of team approaches are the implementation of honest discussions between caregivers to emphasize compassion as well as organization-wide events to enhance workforce well-being. While Gazelle and Panagioti concluded that organizational approaches were superior to individualized interventions, the final verdict has not yet been reached as Wuest's combined intervention addressing burnout at the individual, team, and organizational levels might be the key. Institutions across the nation are coming up with various innovative ways of reducing the EHR and technology induced physician burnout. One of the approaches carried out was by the Mount Sinai Hospital New York in a project called beyond getting rid of stupid stuff in the EHR (Beyond-GROSS). Beyond-GROSS project seeks to get direct feedback from physicians about aspects of EHR that need improvement. This project was modelled after the Hawaii Pacific hospital's getting rid of unnecessary equipment in the EHR(GROSS) Some organizations are outsourcing services, like medical scribing, to relieve the documentation burden on physicians and free up time.

=== Regulatory approaches ===
Due to the fact that physician burnout can impact overall quality of care, many regulatory bodies are also trying to reduce the adverse effect of burnout by putting forward regulations to counter its identified etiologies like unnecessary physician documentations. Centers for Medicare and Medicaid Services (CMS) initiated the "patient over paperwork" initiative to reduce the burden of unnecessary documentations on clinicians.
