= Overtreated =

2007 book by Shannon Brownlee

Overtreated - Why too much Medicine is Making us Sicker and Poorer
- Author: Shannon Brownlee
- Subject: Unnecessary health care
- Publisher: Bloomsbury Publishing
- Publication date: 2007
- Publication place: United States
- Pages: 342
- ISBN: 978-1-58234-580-2
- OCLC: 137325161

Overtreated - Why too much Medicine is Making us Sicker and Poorer is a 2007 book by Shannon Brownlee about unnecessary health care.

== Reviews ==
The reviewer for The New York Times said that the book was "the best description I have yet read of a huge economic problem that we know how to solve—but is so often misunderstood". Kirkus Reviews described the work as "A bombshell of a book: must reading for consumers, their political representatives and all those White House contenders". The reviewer for The Christian Science Monitor said that the author's conclusions in the book were "fascinating, counterintuitive, and potentially revolutionary". A reviewer writing in a social work journal found the book's findings "insightful" and the examples given as "poignant".

The book was reviewed in JAMA: The Journal of the American Medical Association by Norton Hadler, who praised the arguments made, but criticized their quality and the lack of reliance on primary sources. Shannon Doyle in American Journal of Medical Quality similarly praised the timeliness of the book and the detailed arguments, but noted that it the issue is not framed in a political context. In Nursing Ethics, Clair Kaplan notes the extensive use of data in arguments, but was disappointed by the lack of information about nursing.
