= Health humanities =

Health humanities is an interdisciplinary field of study that draws on aspects of the arts and humanities in its approach to health care, health, and well-being. It involves the application of the creative or fine arts (including visual arts, music, performing arts) and humanities disciplines (including literary studies, languages, law, history, philosophy, religion, etc.) to questions of human health and well-being. This applied capacity of the humanities is not itself a novel idea; however, the construct of the health humanities only began to emerge in the first decade of the 21st century.

== Digital health humanities ==
Digital health humanities is an emerging interdisciplinary academic field that leverages digital methods and tools to critically analyze health sciences materials for humanistic research. As a related discipline to both digital humanities and health humanities, digital health humanities uses social and technical features of digital health technologies, and information and communication technologies (ICTs) to explore research questions related to the patients' experience of health and disease.

The field is distinguished from digital health through its focus on humanistic inquiry and critical analysis instead of purely technological implementations and clinical outcomes. Digital health humanities examines the social, cultural, ethical, and experiential dimensions of digital health technologies and their impact on patients, caregivers, and healthcare systems.

== History ==
Historically, the roots informing the health humanities can be traced back to, and can now be considered to include, such multidisciplinary areas as the medical humanities and the expressive therapies/creative arts therapies.

In the health humanities, health (and the promotion of health) is understood according to the constructivist (and other non-positivist) principles indigenous to the humanities, as opposed to the positivism of science. The health humanities are rooted in dialogical (negotiated, intersubjective voices of multiple truths), versus monological (a singular, authoritative voice of "the" truth) perspectives on health. As such, evidence upon which health practices are based is generally considered axiological (based in meanings, values, and aesthetics), versus epistemological (based in factual knowledge), in orientation. The health humanities are not an alternative to the health sciences, but rather offer a contrasting paradigm and pragmatic approach with respect to health and its promotion, and can function in a manner that is complementary to the health sciences.

In January 2009, Paul Crawford became the world's first Professor of Health Humanities at the University of Nottingham, and led with Victoria Tischler, Charley Baker, Brian Brown, Lisa Mooney-Smith and Ronald Carter the development of the Arts and Humanities Research Council-funded International Health Humanities Network. Baccalaureate and Masters programs in health humanities have been developed in the US, Canada and UK. In the UK, a Health Humanities Centre was established in 2015 at University College London, dedicated to research and teaching in the health humanities, including a Master of Arts degree in health humanities. In 2020, a Master of Science in Research in Health Humanities and Arts started at The University of Edinburgh.

== See also ==
- Critical theory
- Interdisciplinarity
- Philosophy of healthcare
- Sociology of health and illness
