= Medical humanities =

Interdisciplinary field of study

Medical humanities is an interdisciplinary field of medicine which includes the humanities (philosophy of medicine, medical ethics and bioethics, history of medicine, literary studies and religion), social science (psychology, medical sociology, medical anthropology, cultural studies, health geography, and disability studies) and the arts (literature, theater, film, and visual arts) and their application to medical education and practice.

Medical humanities uses interdisciplinary research to explore the experience of health and illness through a biopsychosocial lens, often focusing on subjective, hidden, or invisible experience. This interdisciplinary strength has given the field a noted diversity and encouraged creative 'epistemological innovation'. In particular, medical humanities prioritizes the voices of the disabled, making advocacy a central theme in the field. Through the humanities, disabilities become more than medical conditions and expand the definition of human experience.

Medical humanities is sometimes conflated with health humanities which also broadly links health care and social care disciplines with the arts and humanities.

The first department of humanities in a medical school was established in the Hershey Medical Center at Pennsylvania State University in 1967. After the establishment of that department other schools around the country began to follow.

Medical Humanities began as palliative care that a clergy would perform. Unlike hospice care, which emphasizes curative treatment, palliative care focuses on alleviating pain as the primary objective. As part of relieving symptoms, early medical practices relied heavily on the arts, including music, poetry, and visual art. Medical humanities, therefore, began as incorporating arts in patient care, but expanded to a methodology and approach to healing that stresses patient advocacy and dialogue between physician and patient.

== Definitions ==
Medical humanities can be defined as an interdisciplinary, and increasingly international endeavor that draws on the creative and intellectual strengths of diverse disciplines, including literature, art, creative writing, drama, film, music, philosophy, ethical decision making, anthropology, and history, in pursuit of medical educational goals. The humanistic sciences are relevant when multiple people’s perspectives on issues are compiled together to answer questions or even create questions. The arts can provide additional perspective to the sciences.

Critical medical humanities is an approach which argues that the arts and humanities have more to offer to healthcare than simply improving medical education. It proposes that the arts and humanities offer different ways of thinking about human history, culture, behavior and experience which can be used to dissect, critique and influence healthcare practices and priorities.

Translational medical humanities is a related, more applied approach that examines how insights from the humanities can contribute directly to improvements in health and healthcare, extending beyond critical analysis.

== The arts ==
Medical books, pictures, and diagrams help medical students build an appreciation for anything in the medical field from the human body to diseases.

The medical humanities can assist medical practitioners with viewing issues from more than one perspective, such as the visual arts and culture challenge societal assumptions. Both patients and doctors/medical professionals deal with facing decision-making. Each person’s perspective of medical ethics is different from one another due to different cultures, religions, societies, and traditions. The humanities also assist and attempt to create a closer or more meaningful relationship between medical practitioners and their peers/patients. Medical humanities explores how art creates empathy and combines creative expression with scientific understanding.

=== Visual Arts and Medicine ===
Visual representations of disease, medicines, and physicians are common throughout history, and recording observations is still a foundational practice in understanding illness. Knowledge of the human body and disease begins as empirical evidence, which is represented and interpreted as art. Medical art ranges from drawings of lab specimens to depictions of doctor-patient interactions to religious symbols associated with healing. Early English folk medicine included religious ceremonies that would be observed then drawn in manuscripts by clerics. Drawing requires careful examination and accurate transcription, similar to the demands of close monitoring and recording symptoms in patients, so the two disciplines have developed in tandem. Today, visual art is used as a way of critiquing medical culture, specifically gender dynamics and disability treatment in the field.

=== Literature and medicine ===
Formerly called medicine in literature, literature and medicine is an interdisciplinary subfield of the medical humanities considered a "dialogue rather than a merger" between the literary and the medical. Literature and medicine is flourishing in undergraduate programs and in medical schools at all levels. The Pennsylvania State University College of Medicine-Hershey was the first to introduce literature into a medical school curriculum when Joanne Trautmann (Banks), an English professor, was appointed to a position in literature there in 1972. The rationale for using literature and medicine in medical education is three-fold: reading the stories of patients and writing about their experiences gives doctors in training the tools they need to better understand their patients; discussing and reflecting on literature brings the medical practitioner's biases and assumptions into focus, heightening awareness; and reading literature requires critical thinking and empathetic awareness about moral issues in medicine. Outside of education, literary works, including novels and poetry, have been written to reflect on disease experience and as part of healing practices. Poetry, in particular, is a pillar of folk medicine and in early Indo-Germanic culture was thought to have healing properties when spoken aloud.

== Ethics ==
A primary concern of medical humanities is the ethical standards of medical practices and how patients, especially those with disabilities, can be active agents in recovery.

=== Bioethics ===
The first category is bioethics, which includes the morals of healthcare. As science and technology develop, so does healthcare and medicine, and there is discussion and debate in society and healthcare committees that go over the ethics of these certain situations that pertain to medical humanities. For example, one of these cases involves the practice of body enhancements in which the ethics of this practice are questioned due to the fact that bio-medical and technological practices are making changes to a person’s body to improve the body and/or its appearance.

Bioethics, though a subcategory of Medical Humanities also encompasses additional branches such as environmental and animal ethics. influential books such as Moral and Medicine: The Moral Problems of the Patient's right to know the Truth, Contraception, Artificial Insemination, Sterilization, and Euthanasia (Fletcher 1954) and Ramsey's ground was a serious and urgent need for thinking about complex moral issues in medicine and there by facilitated the creation of the new academic discipline of medical ethics (also known as bioethics).

=== Clinical ethics ===
The second category in ethics of the medical humanities is clinical ethics, which refers to the respect that healthcare professionals have for patients and families, and this helps develop a sort of professionalism, respectability, and expertise that healthcare professionals must use in respect to their patients. Another example in the ethics of the medical humanities is bias people and society have against others with disabilities, and how these disabilities correlate with success or what the disabled person is able to do. It is unethical to judge or assume the incapability of a disabled person because disabled people are able to find ways to become successful through modern technology and even through self-determination.

Various academic institutions offer courses of study in the ethics of medical humanities. These programs help their students learn professionalism in the medical field so that they may respectfully help their patients and do what it is right in any situation that may arise.

In recent years, educators and researches have increasingly examined how medical humanities can be systematically integrated into modern medical training to improve empathy, communication skills, and clinician well - being, suggesting that narrative and reflective practices may help balance technical training with humanistic care.

A 2016 review by Dennhardt et al. analyzed quantitative outcome studies and suggested that medical humanities programs can influence empathy, communication, and professional identity formation in medical students.

Following changes to the MCAT in 2015, more U.S medical schools have formally incorporated humanities coursework into their curricula, reflecting a broader recognition of its educational value.

A 2023 mixed-methods study examining 31 U.S medical schools found significant variation in how institutions define and implement medical humanities programs, for example, some schools offer standalone humanities majors or concentrations while others integrate humanities content across existing clinical courses, and the study noted that available information was often incomplete or inconsistent across institutions.

== See also ==
- Biopolitics
- Cinemeducation, the use of film in medical education
- Disability studies
- Health communication
- Health humanities
- Medical anthropology
- Medical journalism
  - Medical literature
- Narrative medicine
- Graphic medicine
- Philosophy of medicine
  - Philosophy of healthcare
- Public health
