= Medical doctor =

Professional who practices medicine

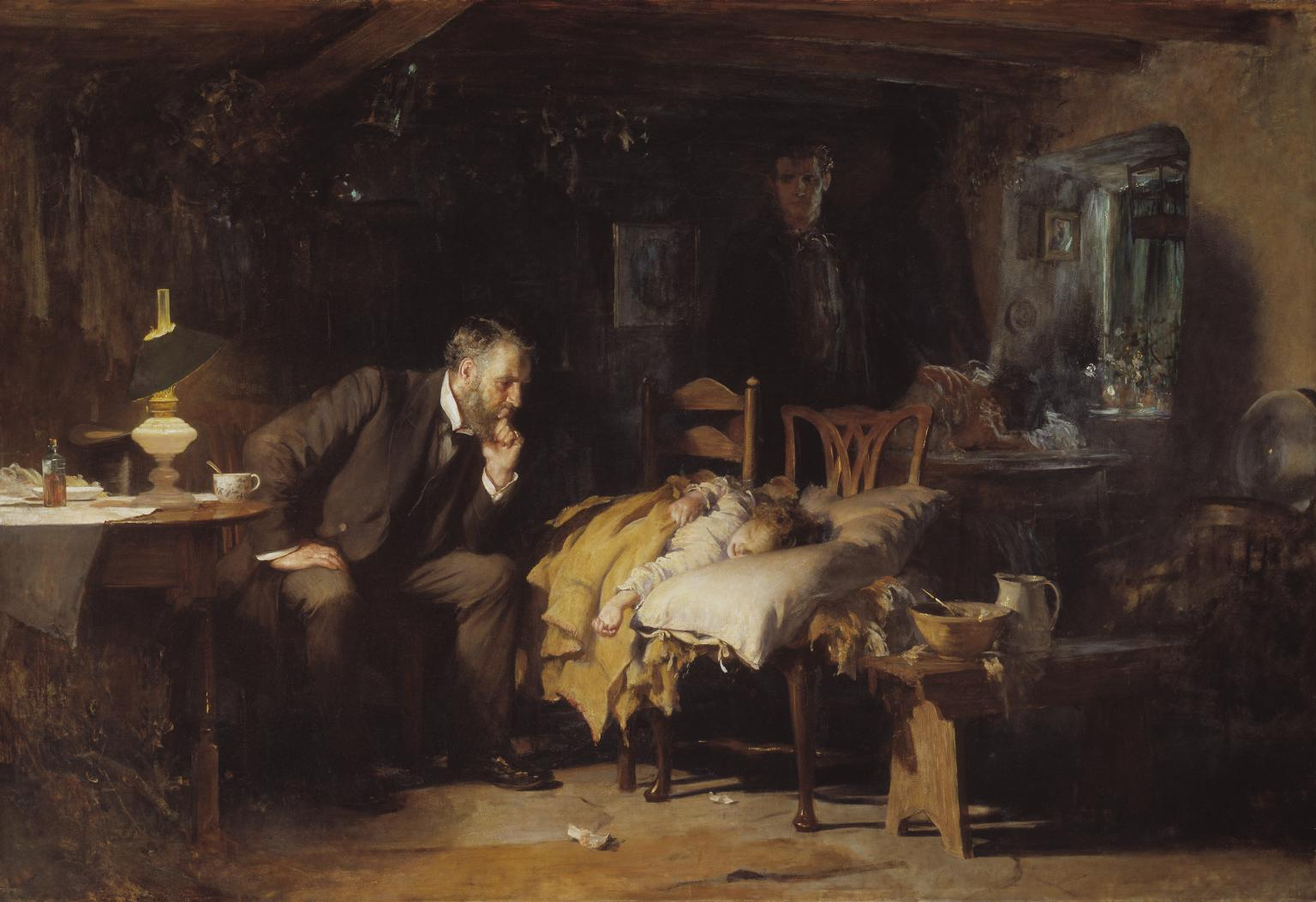
- The Doctor, an 1891 portrait by Luke Fildes

Occupation
- Activity sectors: Healthcare

Description
- Competencies: Diagnosing and treating medical conditions
- Education required: Medical school, medical residency
- Related jobs: Nurse, Clinical officer, Nurse practitioner, Physician associate

A medical doctor, also known as a physician (American and Canadian English) or medical practitioner (British English), is a health professional who practices medicine. Medicine aims to promote, maintain or restore health through the study, diagnosis, prognosis and treatment of disease, injury, and other physical and mental conditions.

Doctors may focus on certain disease categories, types of patients, and methods of treatment, known as specialities. Others work in general practice, providing continuing and comprehensive medical care to individuals, families. Medical practice requires both thorough knowledge of the medical sciences—such as anatomy, physiology, diseases, and their treatment—and strong competence in applying this knowledge in practice, which forms the art or craft of the profession.

Both the role of doctors and the meaning of the word itself vary around the world. Degrees and other qualifications vary widely, but there are some common elements, such as medical ethics requiring that doctors show consideration, compassion, and benevolence for their patients.

== Terminology ==
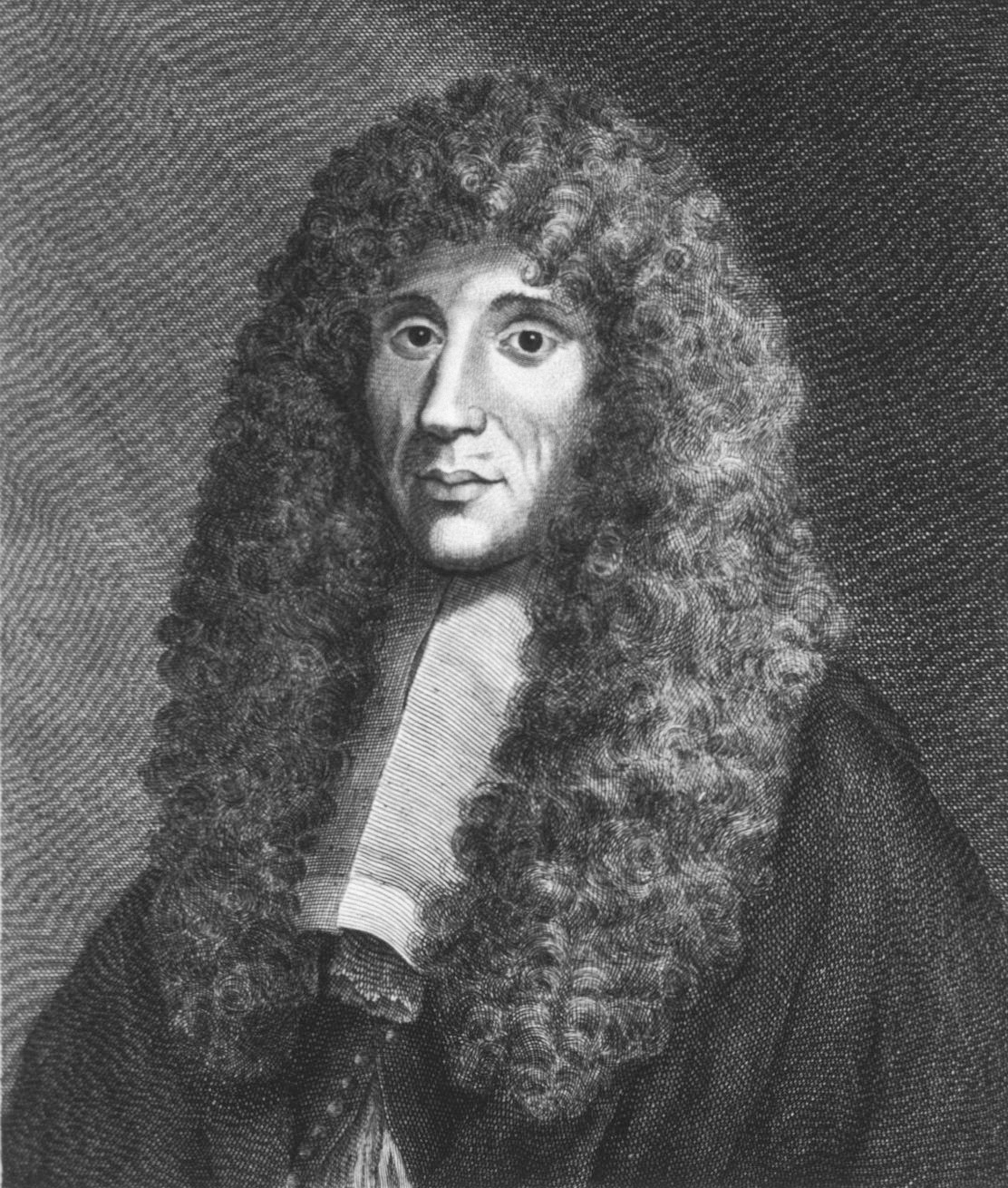
Francesco Redi, considered to be the founder of experimental biology, was the first to recognize and correctly describe details of many important parasites.

The term doctor commonly refers to medical practitioners across the world, but may also be applied to holders of non-medical doctoral degrees. While the term physician is used in North America to refer to medical practitioners in a general sense, in the United Kingdom and countries influenced by British English this word refers to specialists in internal medicine specifically.

=== British and Commonwealth ===
The British meaning of the term physician is the original one, and is used in opposition to surgeon, which refers to a specialist in surgery. This meaning of physician conveys a sense of expertise in treatment with drugs, rather than with the manual procedures used by a surgeon. The English word physician is at least nine hundred years old: physicians and surgeons were once members of separate professions, and traditionally were rivals. The Shorter Oxford English Dictionary, third edition, gives a Middle English quotation making this contrast, from as early as 1400: "O Lord, whi is it so greet difference betwixe a cirugian and a physician." Henry VIII granted a charter to the London Royal College of Physicians in 1518. It was not until 1540 that he granted the Company of Barber-Surgeons (ancestor of the Royal College of Surgeons) its separate charter. In the same year, the English monarch established the Regius Professorship of Physic at the University of Cambridge. Newer universities would probably describe such an academic as a professor of internal medicine. Hence, in the 16th century, physic meant roughly what internal medicine does now.

This original use is common in much of the world including the United Kingdom and other Commonwealth countries (such as Australia, Bangladesh, India, New Zealand, Pakistan, South Africa, Sri Lanka, and Zimbabwe), as well as in places as diverse as Brazil, Hong Kong, Indonesia, Japan, Ireland, and Taiwan. In such places, the more general terms doctor or medical practitioner are used to describe any person whose practises medicine. In Britain, the use of the term "doctor" for medical practitioners is a courtesy and does not indicate possession of a doctorate; British doctors must have a Bachelor of Medicine, Bachelor of Surgery to practise. Community-oriented providers of primary care are called general practitioners, commonly abbreviated to GP.

=== North American ===
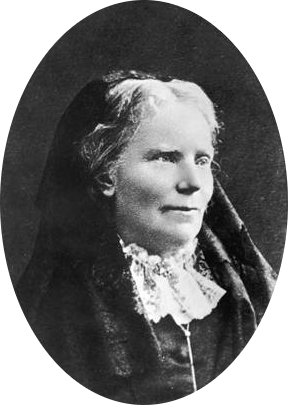
Elizabeth Blackwell, the first female physician in the United States, graduated from SUNY Upstate.

In the United States and Canada, the term physician describes all medical practitioners holding a professional medical degree. The American Medical Association (AMA), established in 1847, as well as the American Osteopathic Association, founded in 1897, both currently use the term physician to describe members. The AMA advocates for the definition of a physician as "an individual possessing degree of either a Doctor of Medicine or Doctor of Osteopathic Medicine". However, the American College of Physicians, established in 1915, use the term physician in its original sense. Specialists in internal medicine may be described as an internist. Another term, hospitalist, was introduced in 1996, to describe US specialists in internal medicine who work largely or exclusively in hospitals. Such "hospitalists" now make up about 19% of all US general internists, who are often called general physicians in Commonwealth countries. In North America, community-oriented providers of primary care are called family doctors or primary care physicians.

The vast majority of physicians trained in the United States have a Doctor of Medicine degree, and use the initials M.D. A smaller number attend osteopathic medical schools and have a Doctor of Osteopathic Medicine degree and use the initials D.O. The World Directory of Medical Schools lists both MD and DO granting schools as medical schools located in the United States. After completion of medical school, physicians complete a residency in the specialty in which they will practice. Subspecialties require the completion of a fellowship after residency. Both MD and DO physicians participate in the National Resident Matching Program (NRMP) and attend ACGME-accredited residencies and fellowships across all medical specialties to obtain licensure. All boards of certification now require that physicians demonstrate, by examination, continuing mastery of the core knowledge and skills for a chosen specialty. Recertification varies by particular specialty between every seven and every ten years.

As of 2022, more than a quarter of physicians in the United States were graduates of medical programs outside the United States, otherwise known as "IMGs" for "international medical graduates". As of 2026, more than a third of internal medicine physicians in the United States were IMGs.

=== Physician and surgeon ===
Around the world, the combined term physician and surgeon is used to describe either a general practitioner or any medical practitioner irrespective of specialty. This usage still shows the original meaning of physician and preserves the old difference between a physician, as a practitioner of physic, and a surgeon. The term may be used by state medical boards in the United States, and by equivalent bodies in Canadian provinces, to describe any medical practitioner.

== Supply and demand ==
Medical doctors per 1,000 people as of 2018

Many countries in the world have the problem of too few doctors. Increasing medical school enrollment and number of medical residency positions increases the number of medical doctors. Higher physician supply reduces physician overtimes, physician burnout and improves physician consultation lengths. Long medical working hours and sleep deprivation contribute to medical errors.

== Social role and world view ==
=== Biomedicine ===
Within Western culture and over recent centuries, medicine has become increasingly based on scientific reductionism and materialism. This style of medicine is now dominant throughout the industrialized world, and is often termed biomedicine by medical anthropologists. Biomedicine "formulates the human body and disease in a culturally distinctive pattern", and is a world view learnt by medical students. Within this tradition, the medical model is a term for the complete "set of procedures in which all doctors are trained", including mental attitudes. A particularly clear expression of this world view, currently dominant among conventional doctors, is evidence-based medicine. Within conventional medicine, most doctors still pay heed to their ancient traditions:

The critical sense and sceptical attitude of the Hippocratic school ... the emancipation of medicine from the shackles of priestcraft and of caste; secondly, the conception of medicine as an art based on accurate observation, and as a science, an integral part of the science of man and of nature; thirdly, the high moral ideals, expressed in that most "memorable of human documents" (Gomperz), the Hippocratic oath; and fourthly, the conception and realization of medicine as the profession of a cultivated gentleman.

— Sir William Osler, Chauvinism in Medicine (1902)

In this Western tradition, doctors are considered to be members of a learned profession, and enjoy high social status, often combined with expectations of a high and stable income and job security. However, medical practitioners often work long and inflexible hours, with shifts at unsociable times. Their high status is partly from their extensive training requirements, and also because of their occupation's special ethical and legal duties. The term traditionally used by doctors to describe a person seeking their help is the word patient (although one who visits a doctor for a routine check-up may also be so described). This word patient is an ancient reminder of medical duty, as it originally meant 'one who suffers'. The English noun comes from the Latin word patiens, the present participle of the deponent verb, patior, meaning 'I am suffering', and akin to the Greek verb πάσχειν (romanized: paschein, lit. to suffer) and its cognate noun πάθος (pathos, suffering).

=== Alternative medicine ===
While contemporary biomedicine has distanced itself from its ancient roots in religion and magic, many forms of traditional medicine and alternative medicine continue to espouse vitalism in various guises: "As long as life had its own secret properties, it was possible to have sciences and medicines based on those properties". The US National Center for Complementary and Alternative Medicine (NCCAM) classifies complementary and alternative medicine therapies into five categories or domains, including: alternative medical systems, or complete systems of therapy and practice; mind-body interventions, or techniques designed to facilitate the mind's effect on bodily functions and symptoms; biologically based systems including herbalism; and manipulative and body-based methods such as chiropractic and massage therapy.

In considering these alternate traditions that differ from biomedicine (see above), medical anthropologists emphasize that all ways of thinking about health and disease have a significant cultural content, including conventional western medicine.

=== Doctors' own health ===
Some commentators have argued that doctors have duties to serve as role models for the general public in matters of health, for example by not smoking cigarettes. Indeed, in most western nations relatively few doctors smoke, and their professional knowledge does appear to have a beneficial effect on their health and lifestyle. According to a study of male doctors in the United States, life expectancy is slightly higher for doctors (73 years for white and 69 years for black) than lawyers or many other highly educated professionals. Causes of death which are less likely to occur in doctors than the general population include respiratory disease (including pneumonia, pneumoconioses, COPD, but excluding emphysema and other chronic airway obstruction), alcohol-related deaths, rectosigmoid and anal cancers, and bacterial diseases.

Doctors do experience exposure to occupational hazards, and there is a well-known aphorism that "doctors make the worst patients". Causes of death that are shown to be higher in doctors include suicide among doctors and self-inflicted injury, drug-related causes, traffic accidents, and cerebrovascular and ischaemic heart disease. Doctors are also prone to occupational burnout. This manifests as a long-term stress reaction characterized by poorer quality of care towards patients, emotional exhaustion, a feeling of decreased personal achievement, and others. A study by the Agency for Healthcare Research and Quality reported that time pressure was the greatest cause of burnout; a survey from the American Medical Association reported that more than half of all respondents chose "too many bureaucratic tasks" as the leading cause of physician burnout.

== Education and training ==
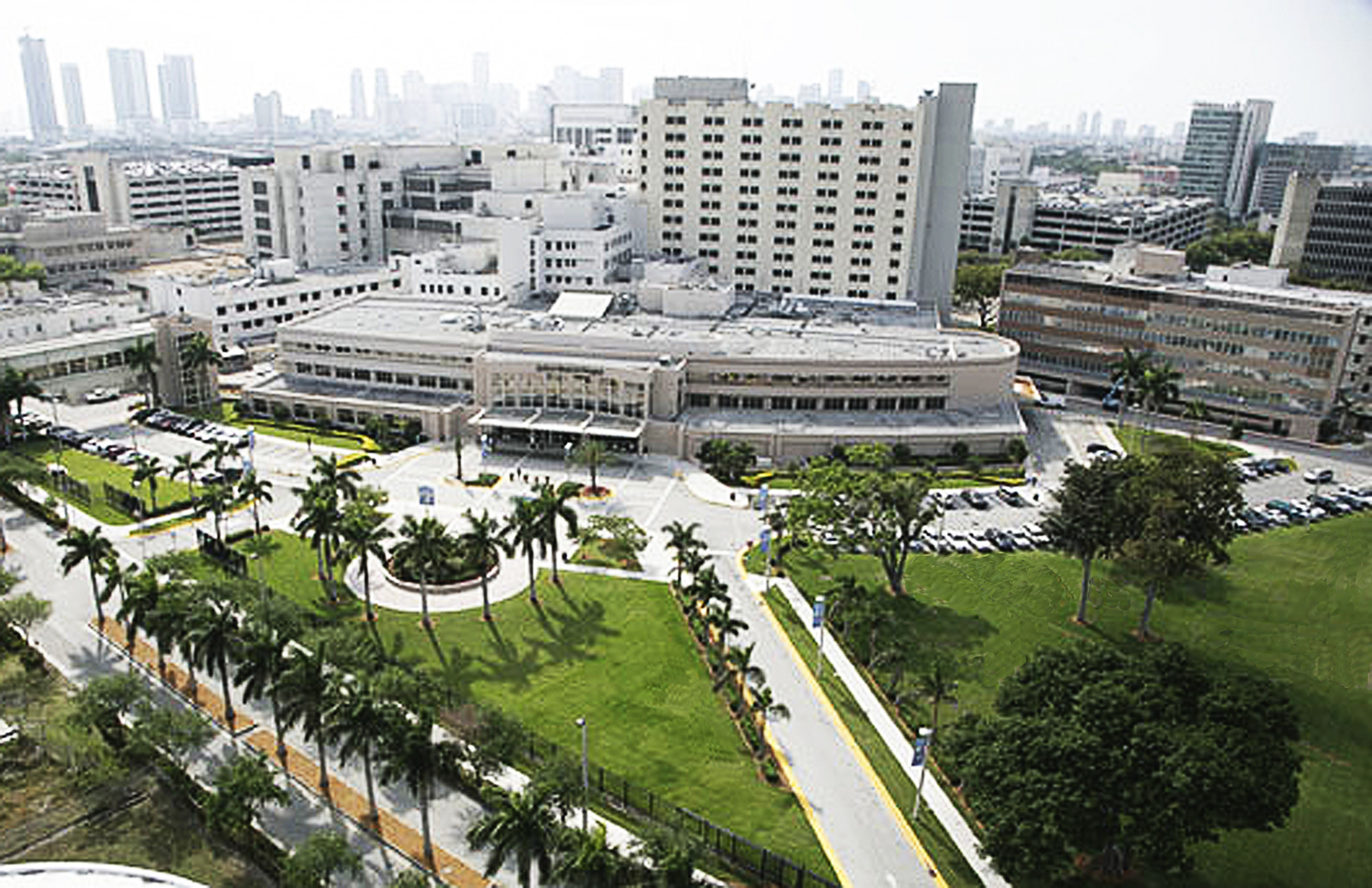
Jackson Memorial Hospital in Miami, the primary teaching hospital for the Miller School of Medicine at the University of Miami

Medical education and career pathways for doctors vary considerably across the world.

In all developed countries, entry-level medical education programs are tertiary-level courses, undertaken at a medical school attached to a university. Depending on jurisdiction and university, entry may follow directly from secondary school or require pre-requisite undergraduate education. The former commonly takes five or six years to complete. Programs that require previous undergraduate education (typically a three- or four-year degree, often in science) are usually four or five years in length. Hence, gaining a basic medical degree may typically take from five to eight years, depending on jurisdiction and university.

Following the completion of entry-level training, newly graduated medical practitioners are often required to undertake a period of supervised practice before full registration is granted, typically one or two years. This may be referred to as an "internship", as the "foundation" years in the UK, or as "conditional registration". Some jurisdictions, including the United States, require residencies for practice.

Medical practitioners hold a medical degree specific to the university from which they graduated. This degree qualifies the medical practitioner to become licensed or registered under the laws of that particular country, and sometimes of several countries, subject to requirements for an internship or conditional registration.

== Regulation ==
In most jurisdictions, doctors need government permission to practice. Such permission is intended to promote public safety, and often to protect government spending, as medical care is commonly subsidized by national governments.

In some jurisdictions such as in Singapore, it is common for medical practitioners to inflate their qualifications with the title "Dr" in correspondence or namecards, even if their qualifications are limited to a basic (e.g., bachelor level) degree. In other countries such as Germany, only medical practitioners holding an academic doctorate may call themselves "doctor" – on the other hand, the European Research Council has decided that the German medical doctorate does not meet the international standards of a PhD research degree.

=== Licensing ===
Among the English-speaking countries, this process is known either as licensure as in the United States, or as registration in the United Kingdom, other Commonwealth countries, and Ireland. Synonyms in use elsewhere include colegiación in Spain, ishi menkyo in Japan, autorisasjon in Norway, Approbation in Germany, and άδεια εργασίας in Greece. In France, Italy and Portugal, doctors must be members of a national order of medical practitioners.

In some countries, including the United Kingdom and Ireland, the medical profession largely regulates itself, with the government affirming the regulating body's authority. The best-known example of this is probably the General Medical Council of Britain. In all countries, the regulating authorities will revoke permission to practice in cases of malpractice or serious misconduct.

In the large English-speaking federations (United States, Canada, Australia), the licensing or registration of medical practitioners is done at a state or provincial level, or nationally as in New Zealand. Australian states usually have a "Medical Board", which has now been replaced by the Australian Health Practitioner Regulation Agency (AHPRA) in most states, while Canadian provinces usually have a "College of Physicians and Surgeons". All American states have an agency that is usually called the "Medical Board", although there are alternate names such as "Board of Medicine", "Board of Medical Examiners", "Board of Medical Licensure", "Board of Healing Arts" or some other variation. After graduating from a first-professional school, physicians who wish to practice in the US usually take standardized exams, such as the USMLE for a Doctor in Medicine.

=== Performance and professionalism supervision ===
The issue of medical errors, medical malpractice, drug abuse, and other issues in a doctors' professional behavior received significant attention across the world, in particular following a critical 2000 report which "arguably launched" the patient-safety movement. In the US, as of 2006 there were few organizations that systematically monitored performance. In the US, only the Department of Veterans Affairs randomly drug tests doctors, in contrast to drug testing practices for other professions that have a major impact on public welfare. Licensing boards at the US state-level depend upon continuing education to maintain competence. Through the use of the National Practitioner Data Bank, Federation of State Medical Boards' disciplinary report, and American Medical Association Physician Profile Service, the 67 State Medical Boards continually self-report any adverse/disciplinary actions taken against a licensed doctor so that the other Medical Boards in which the doctor holds or is applying for a medical license will be properly notified so that corrective, reciprocal action can be taken against the offending doctor. In Europe, as of 2009 the health systems are governed according to various national laws, and can also vary according to regional differences similar to the United States.

== See also ==
- AI doctor
- Doctor's office
- Doctor–patient relationship
- Occupations of physicians and surgeons
- Health care quality
- International medical graduate
- List of countries and dependencies by number of physicians
- List of medical schools
- List of physicians
- Medic
- Nurse
- Physician assistant
- Physician-scientist
- Physicians in Canada
